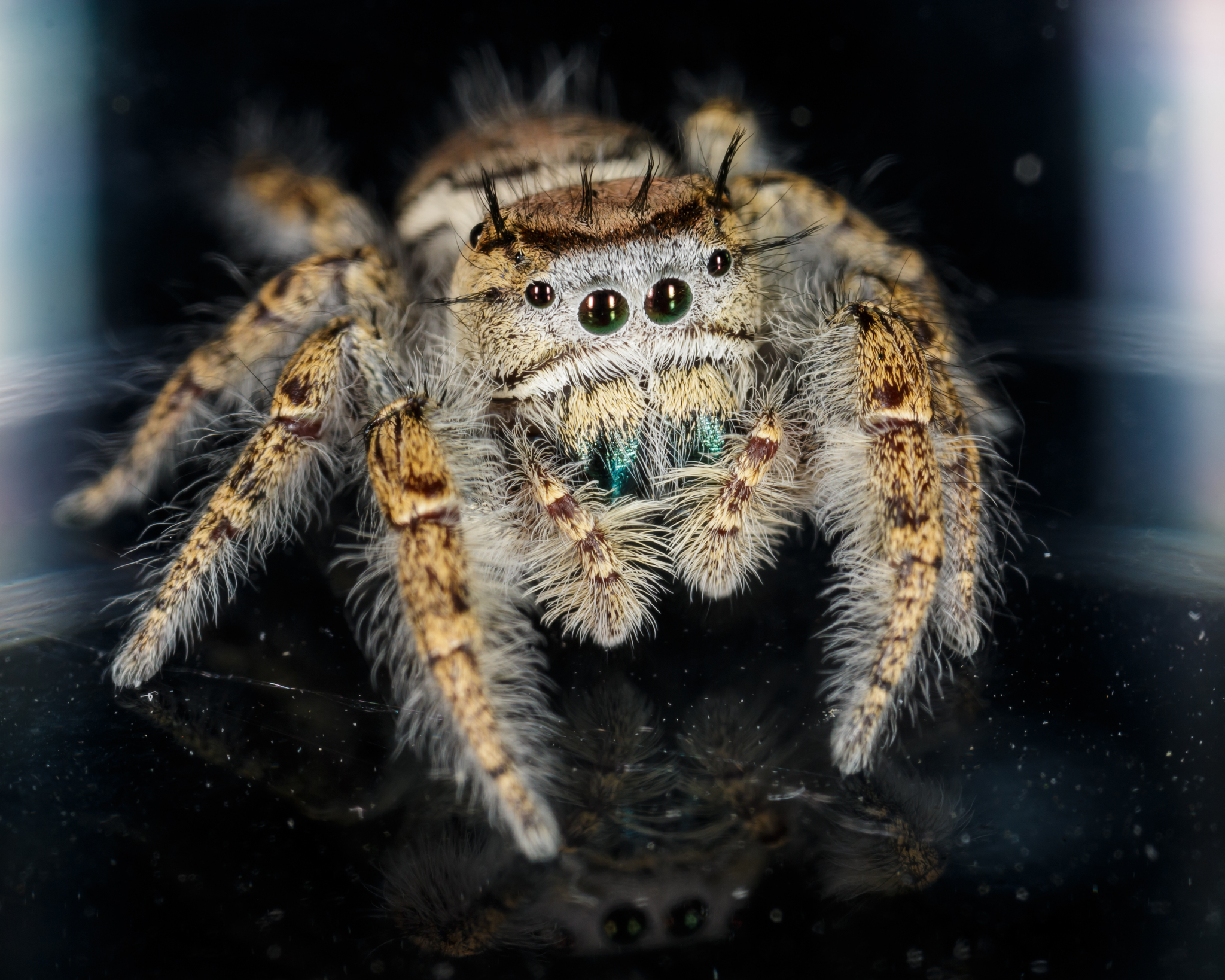
- Female

Scientific classification
- Kingdom: Animalia
- Phylum: Arthropoda
- Subphylum: Chelicerata
- Class: Arachnida
- Order: Araneae
- Infraorder: Araneomorphae
- Family: Salticidae
- Genus: Phidippus
- Species: P. carolinensis

Binomial name
- Phidippus carolinensis Peckham & Peckham, 1909

= Phidippus carolinensis =

Species of spider

Phidippus carolinensis is a species of jumping spider. It is found in the United States and Mexico.

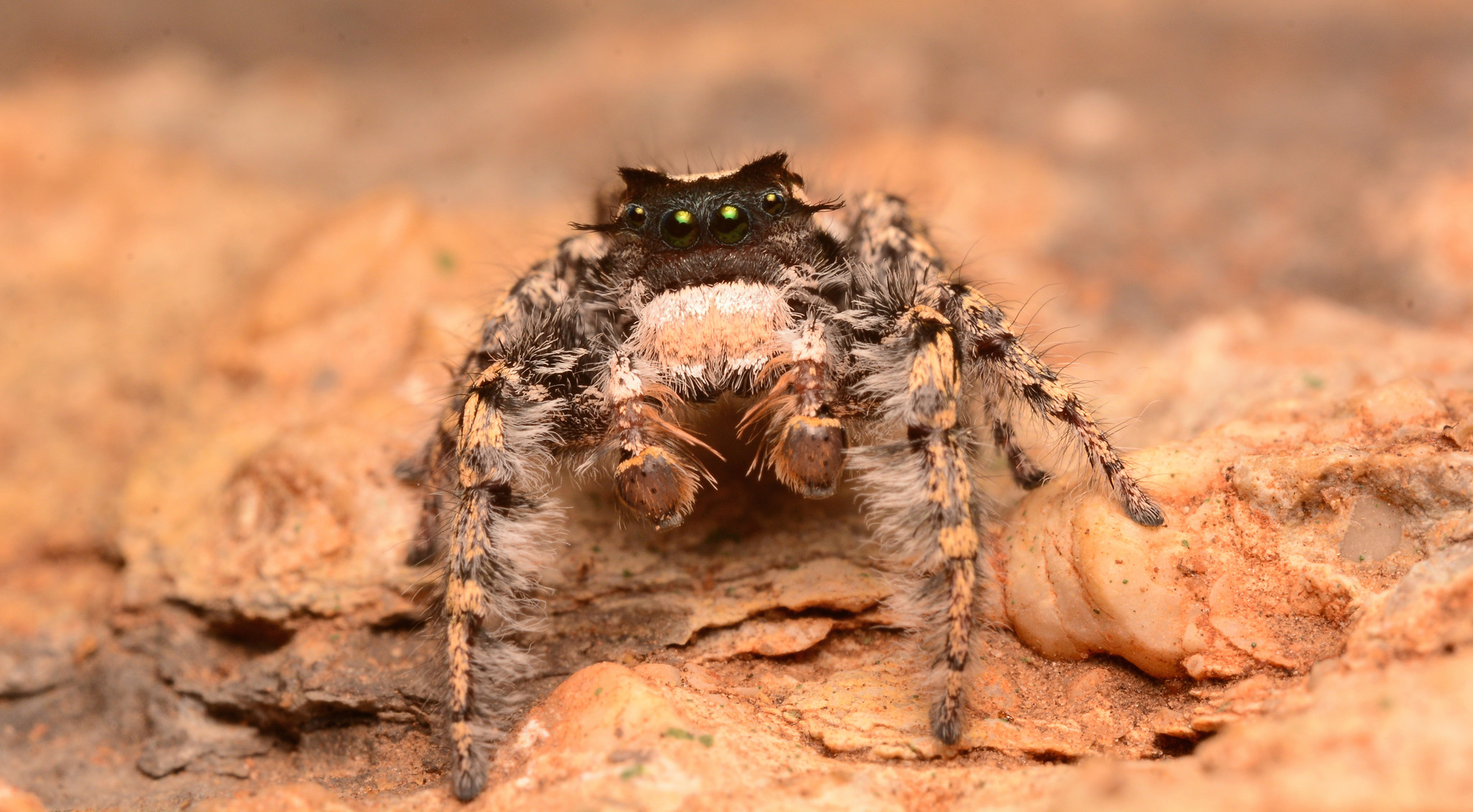
Adult male Phidippus carolinensis face

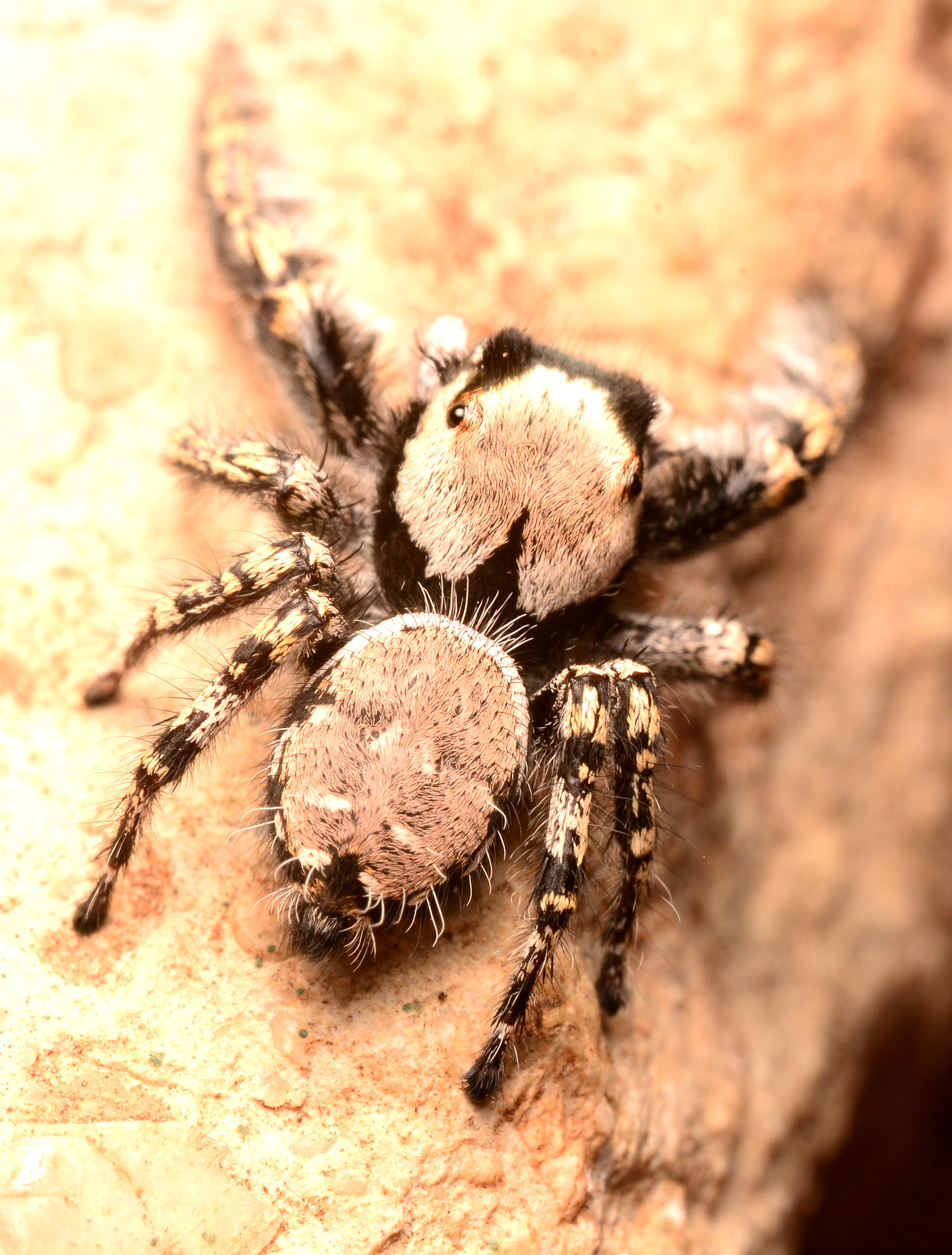
Adult male Phidippus carolinensis dorsal

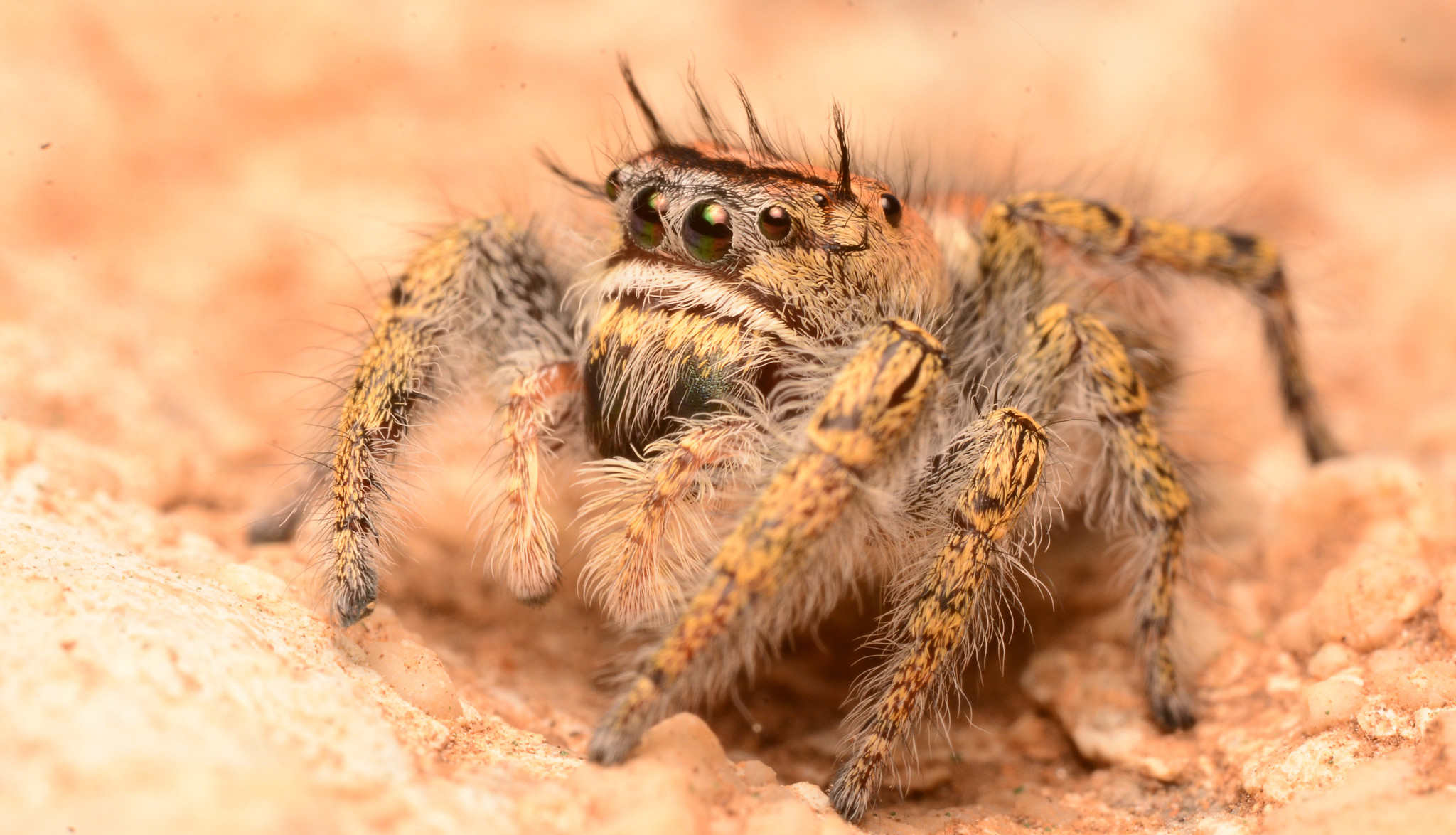
Adult female Phidippus carolinensis face

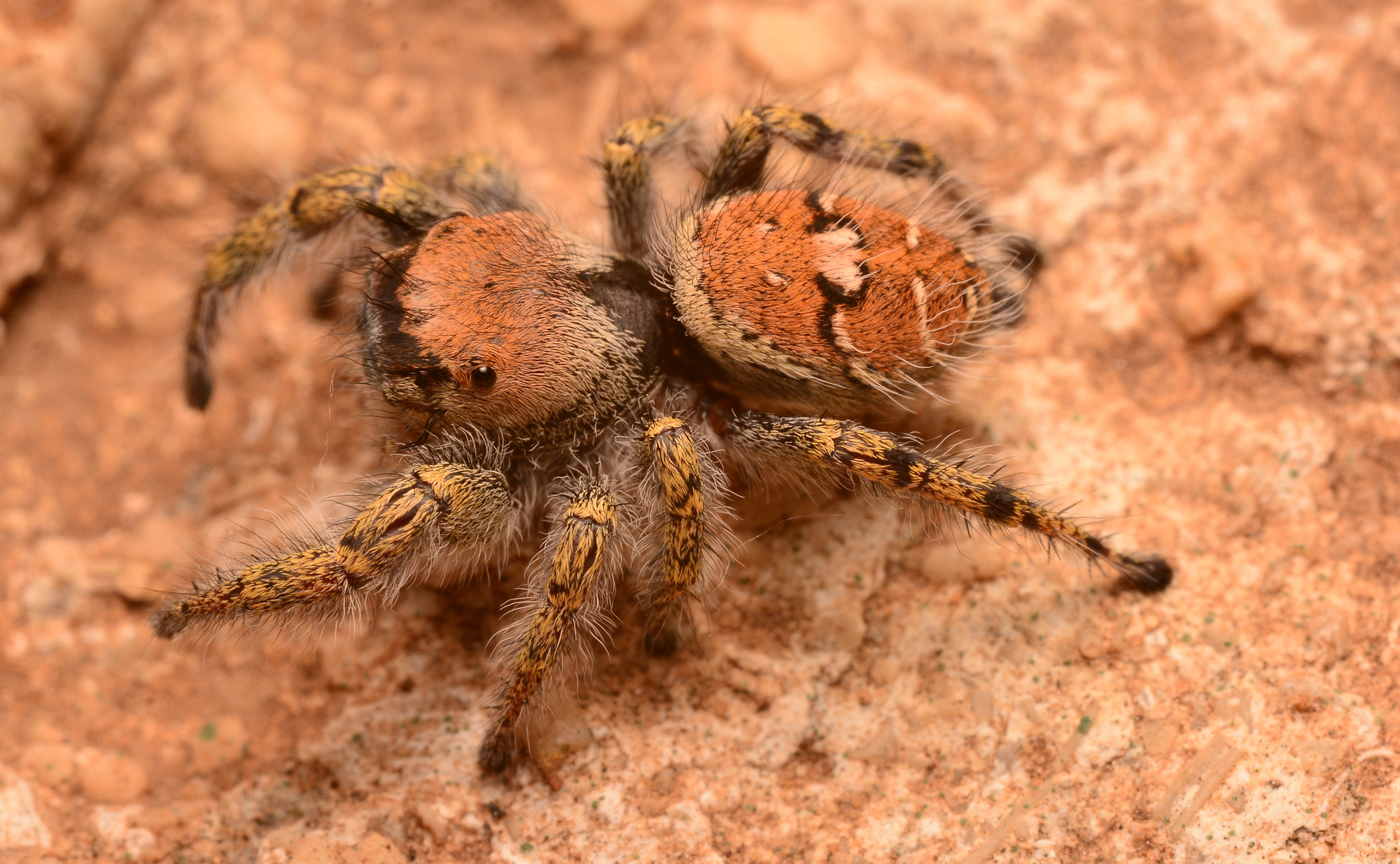
Adult female Phidippus carolinensis dorsal
