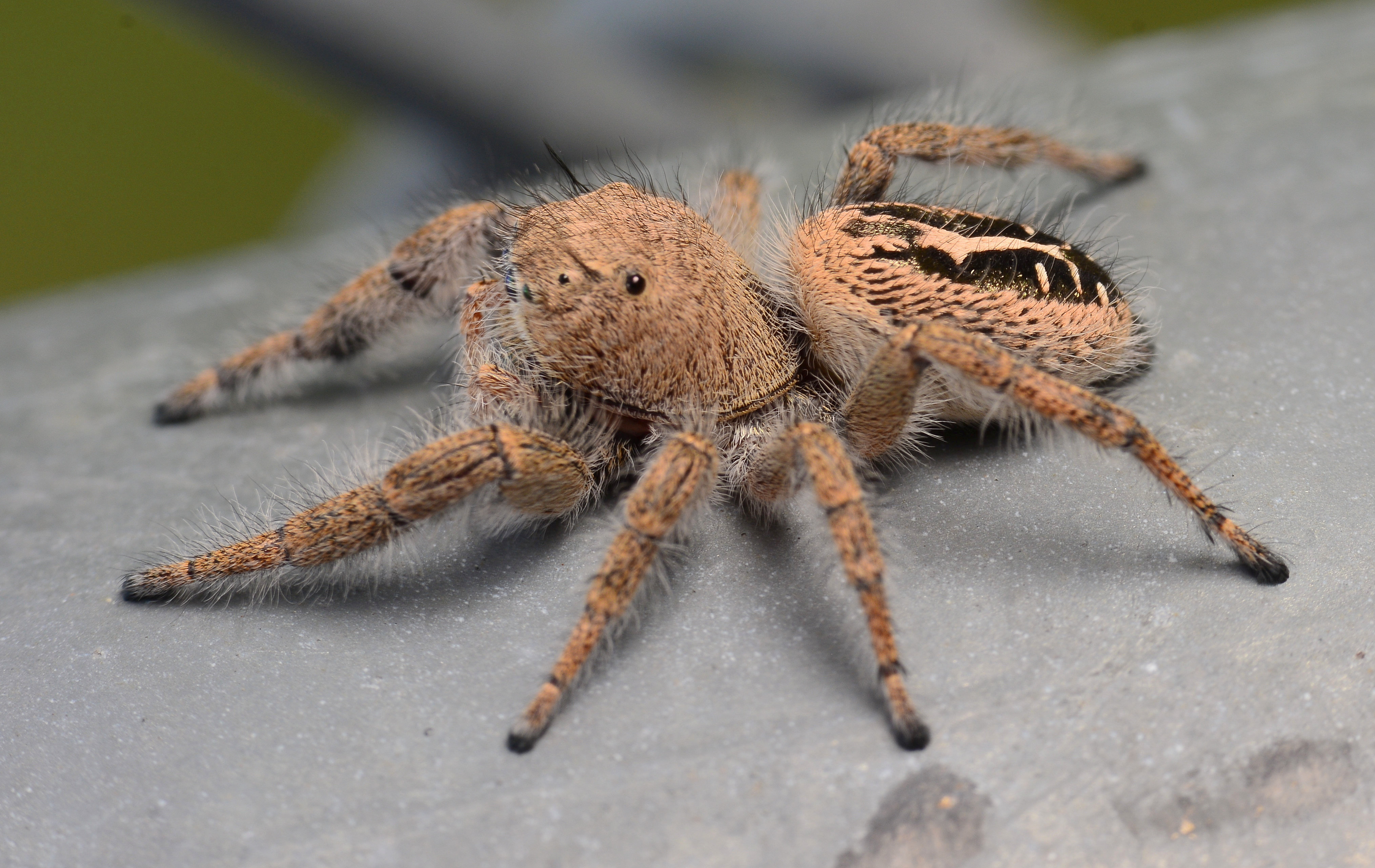

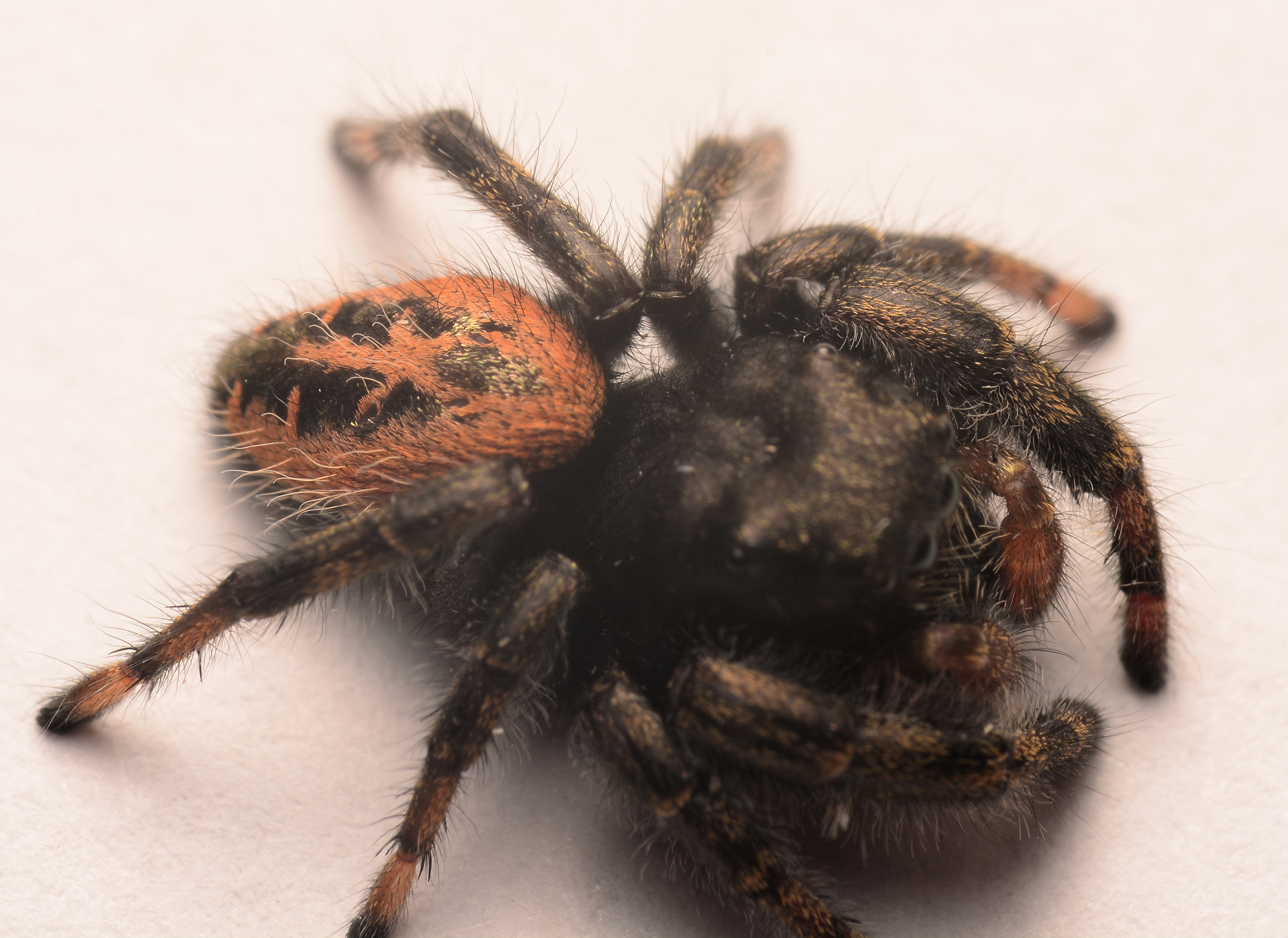

Scientific classification
- Kingdom: Animalia
- Phylum: Arthropoda
- Subphylum: Chelicerata
- Class: Arachnida
- Order: Araneae
- Infraorder: Araneomorphae
- Family: Salticidae
- Genus: Phidippus
- Species: P. texanus

Binomial name
- Phidippus texanus Banks, 1906

= Phidippus texanus =

Species of spider

Phidippus texanus is a species of jumping spider in the family Salticidae. It is found in the United States and Mexico.

== Gallery ==
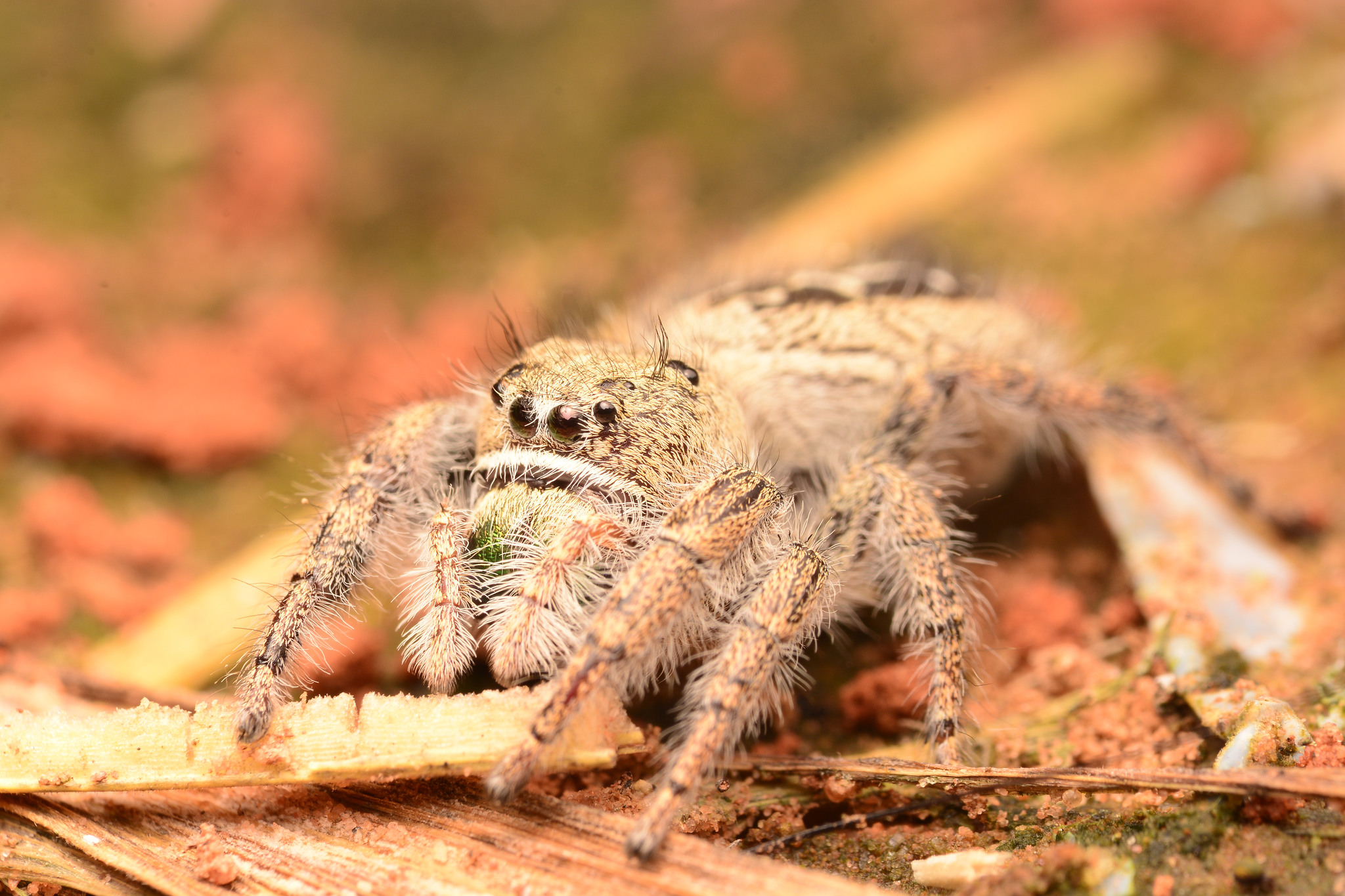
Adult female face

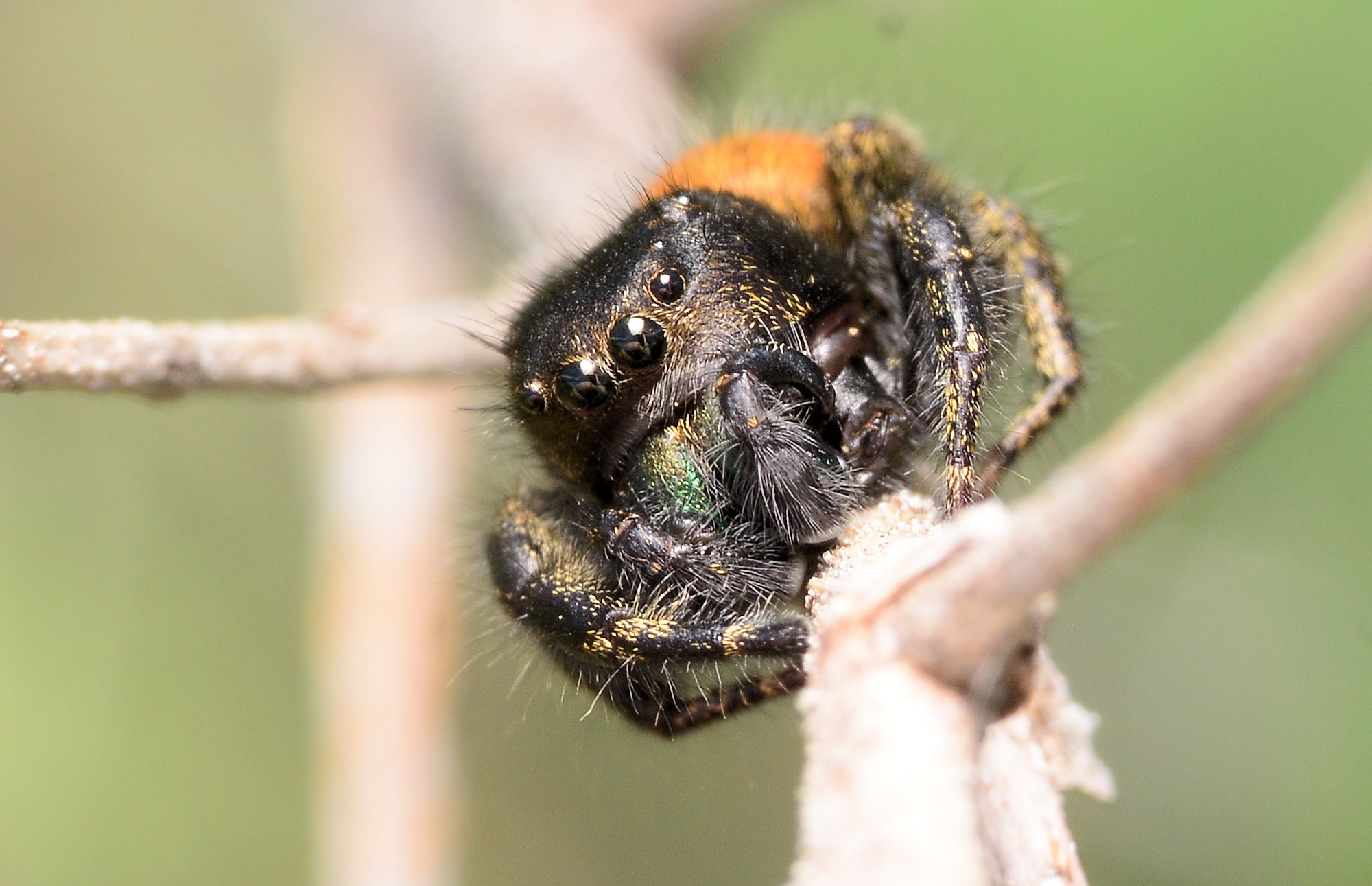
Adult male face

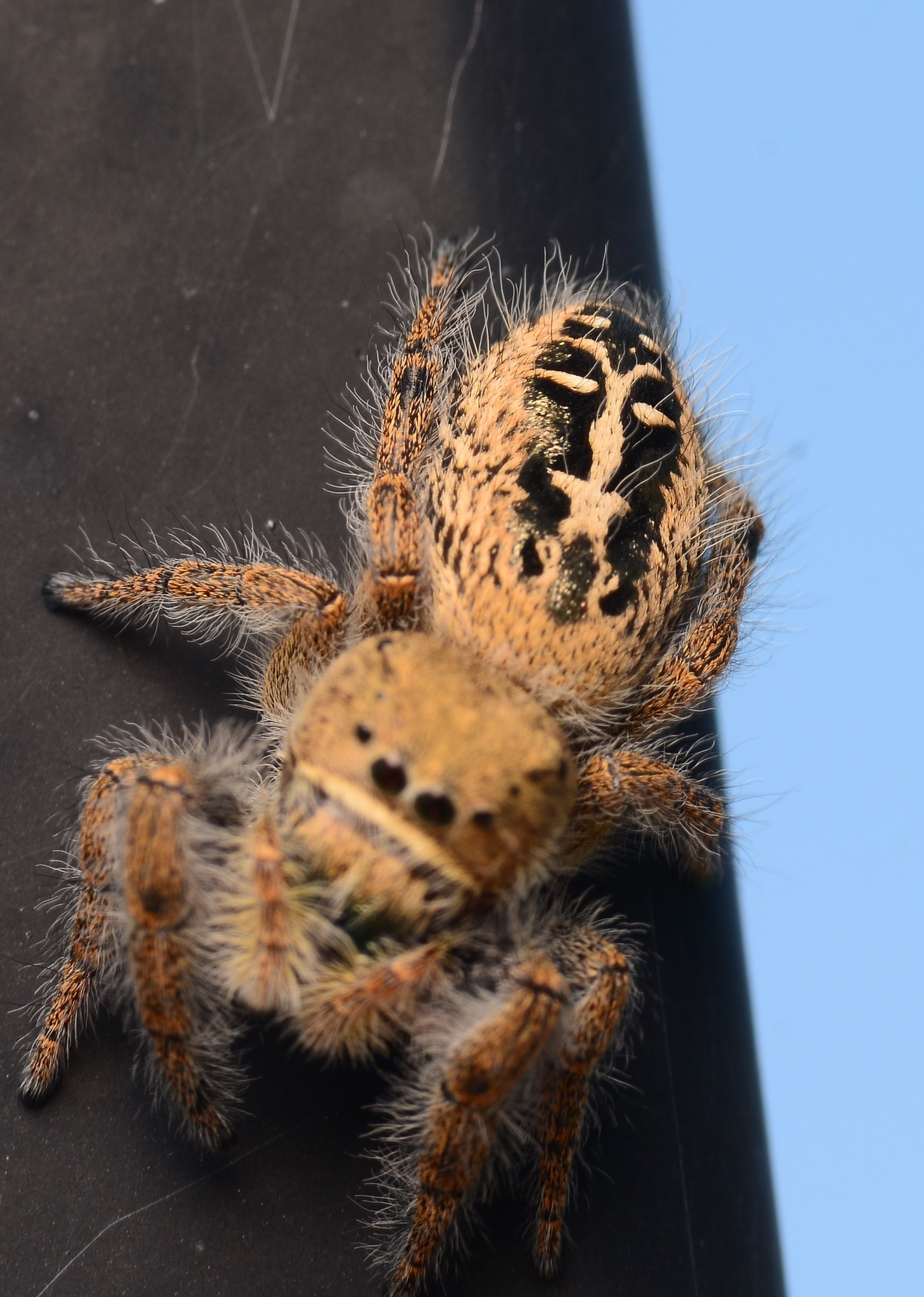
Adult female dorsal view

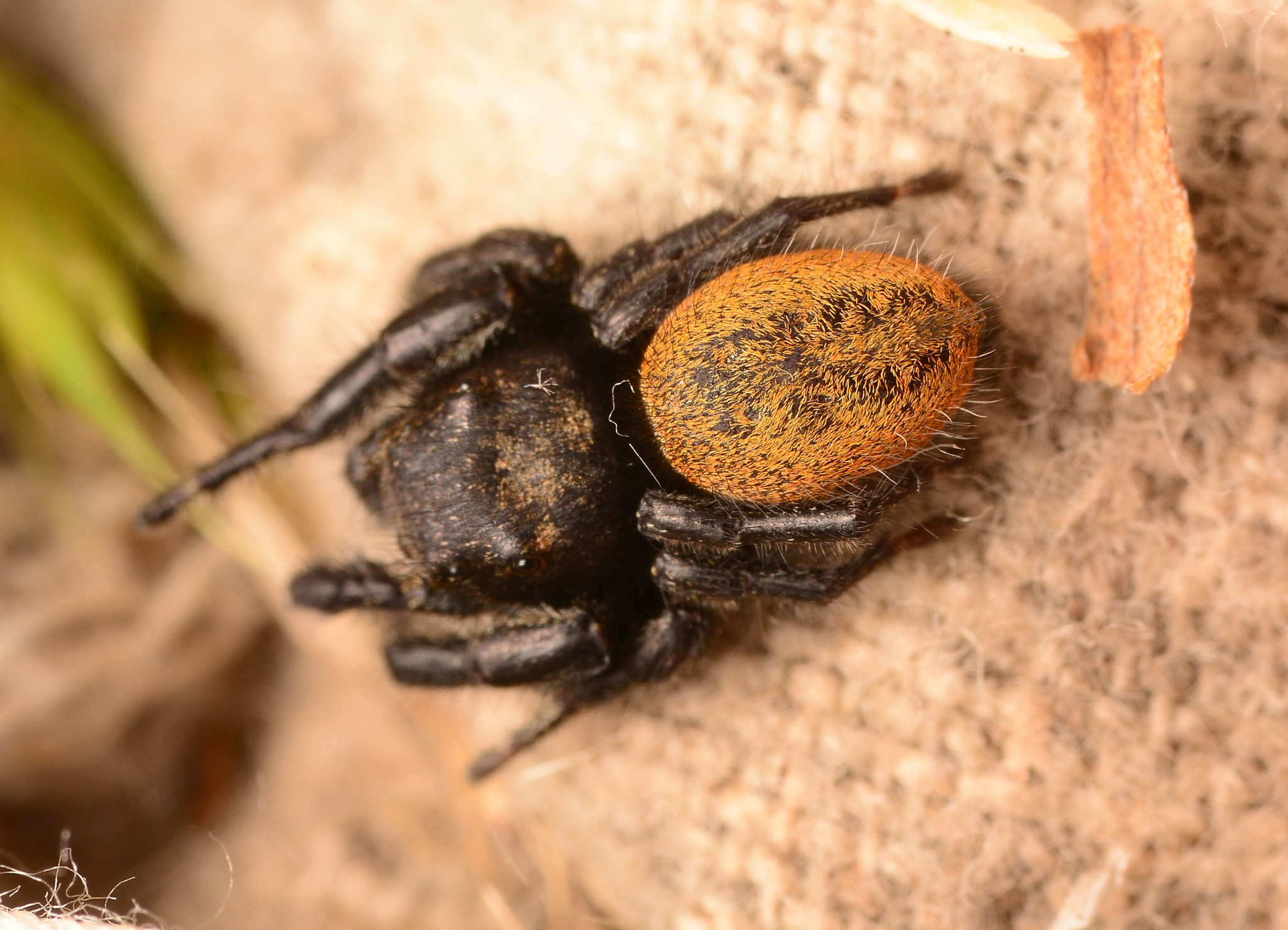
Adult male dorsal view
