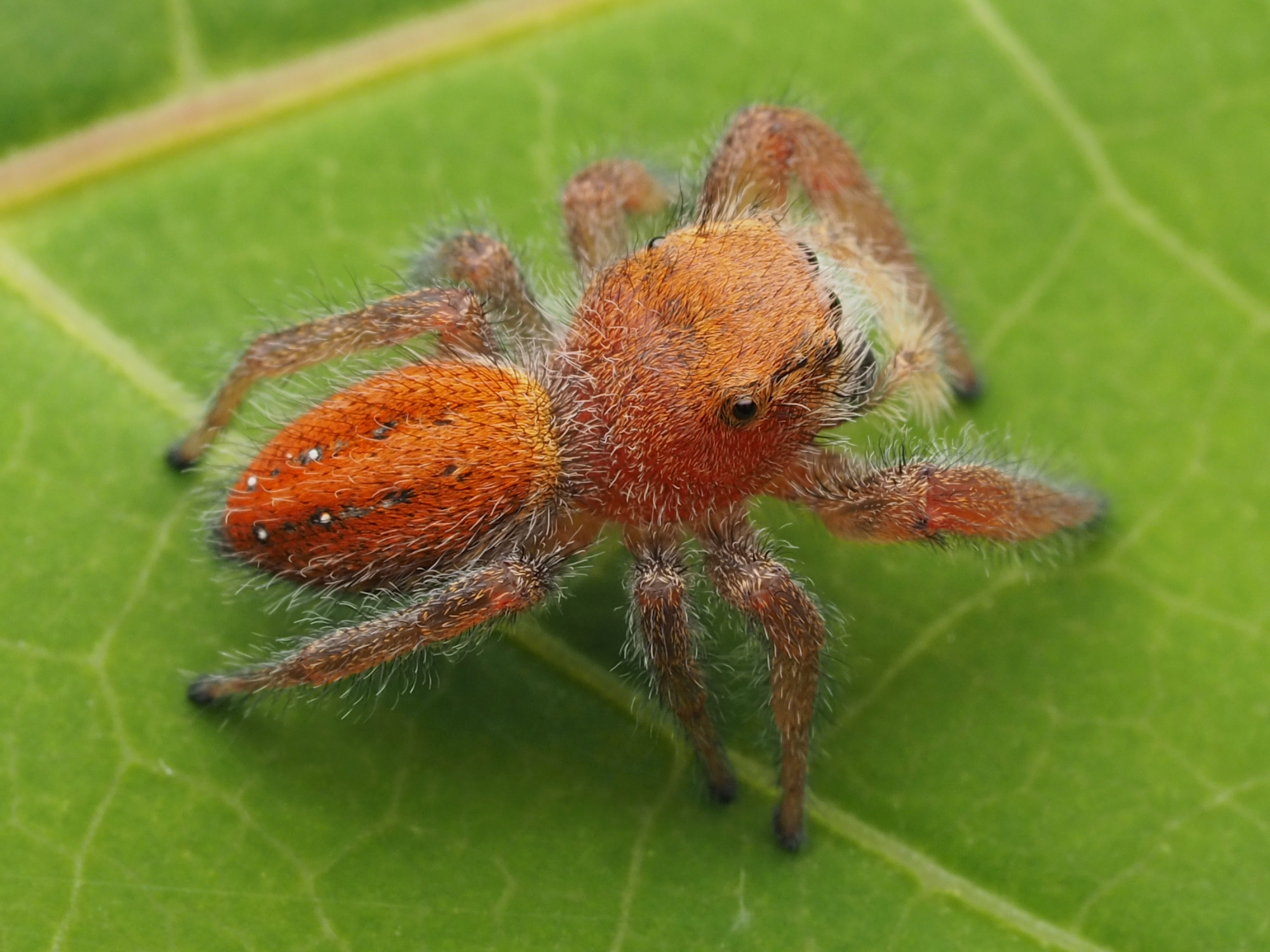
- Adult female P. pius

Scientific classification
- Kingdom: Animalia
- Phylum: Arthropoda
- Subphylum: Chelicerata
- Class: Arachnida
- Order: Araneae
- Infraorder: Araneomorphae
- Family: Salticidae
- Genus: Phidippus
- Species: P. pius

Binomial name
- Phidippus pius Scheffer, 1905

= Phidippus pius =

Species of spider

Phidippus pius is a species of jumping spider that is found in Central America and North America. Its range extends from the Eastern United States (excluding New England), west to Arizona, and south to Costa Rica. The color pattern of this species varies. Females are yellow to orange while males are orange to red.

== Name ==
The species name is derived from the Latin word pius or "pious", meaning dutiful, godly, or holy.

== Gallery ==
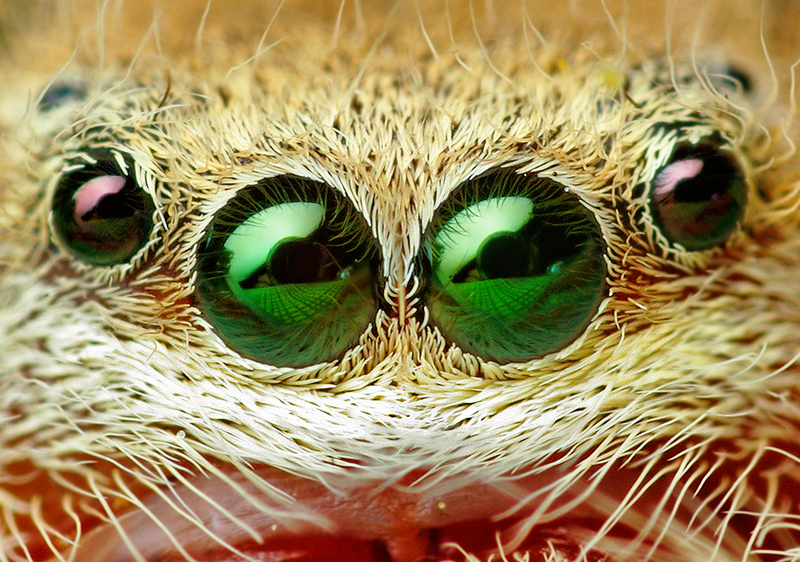
Eyes of an adult female Phidippus pius

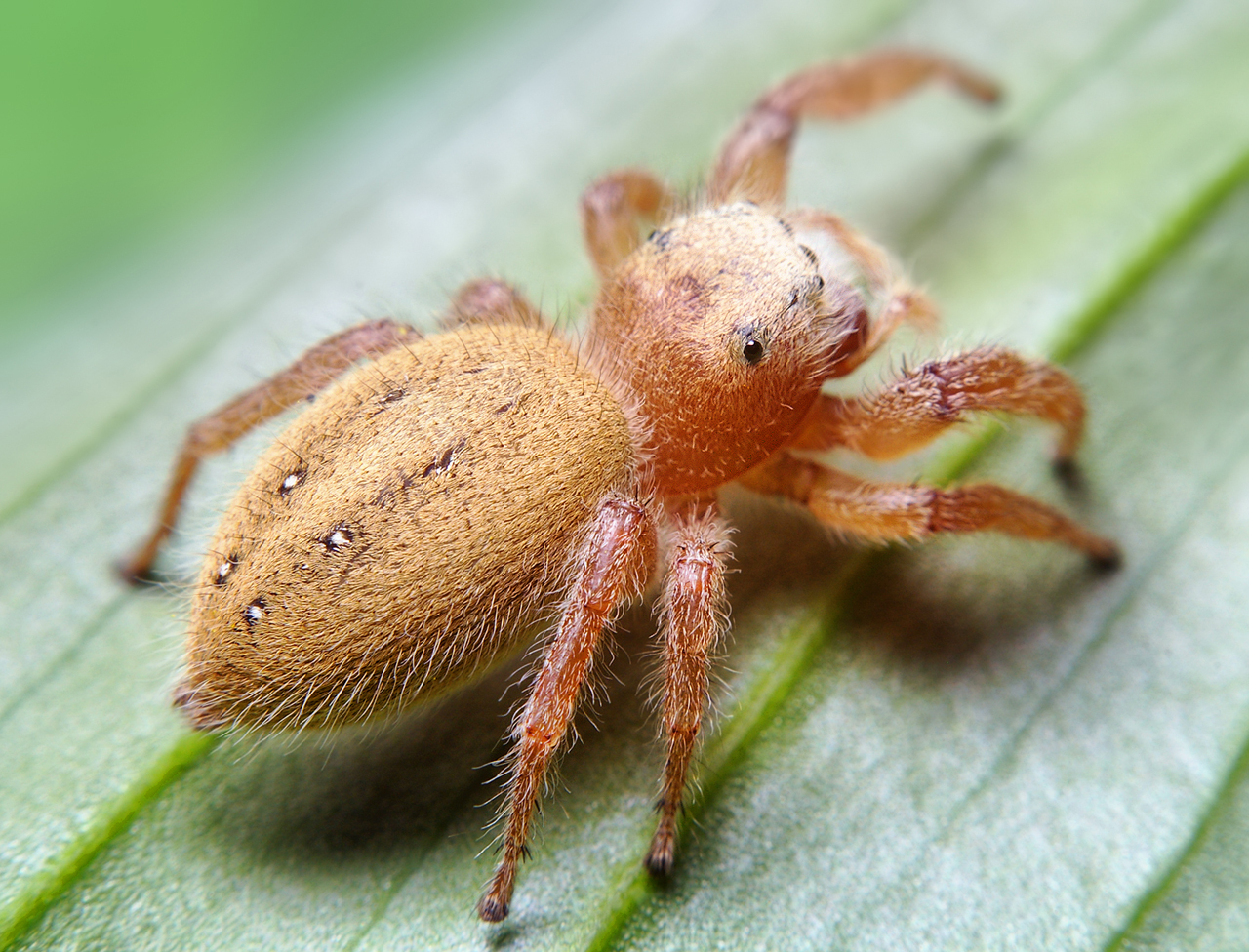
View of the abdomen of an adult female

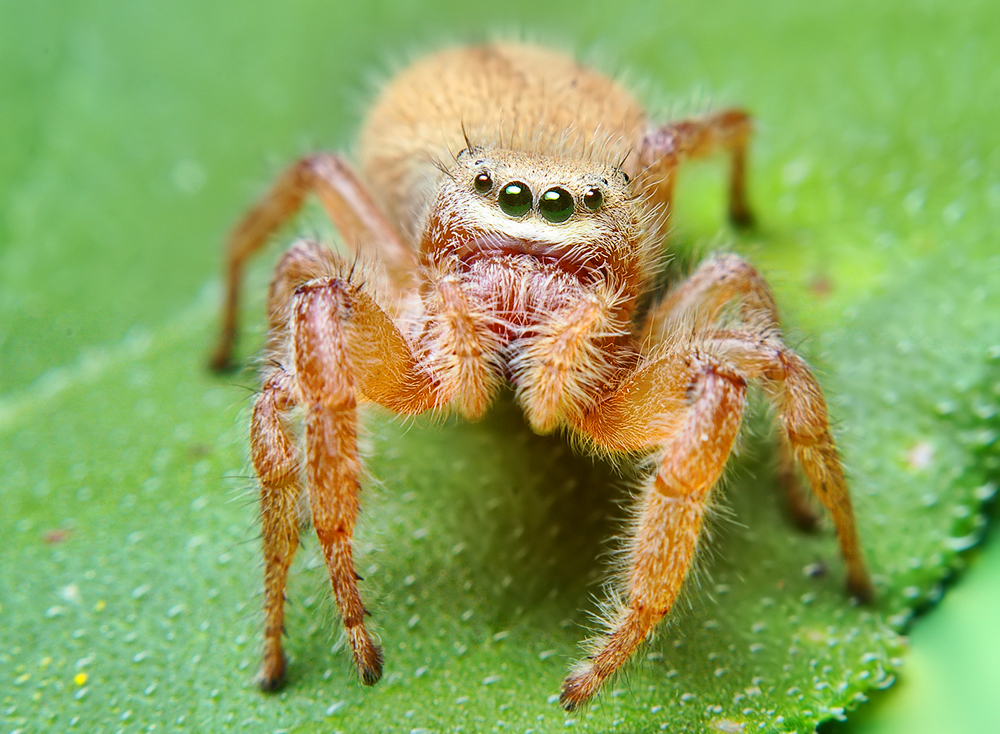
Front view of an adult female

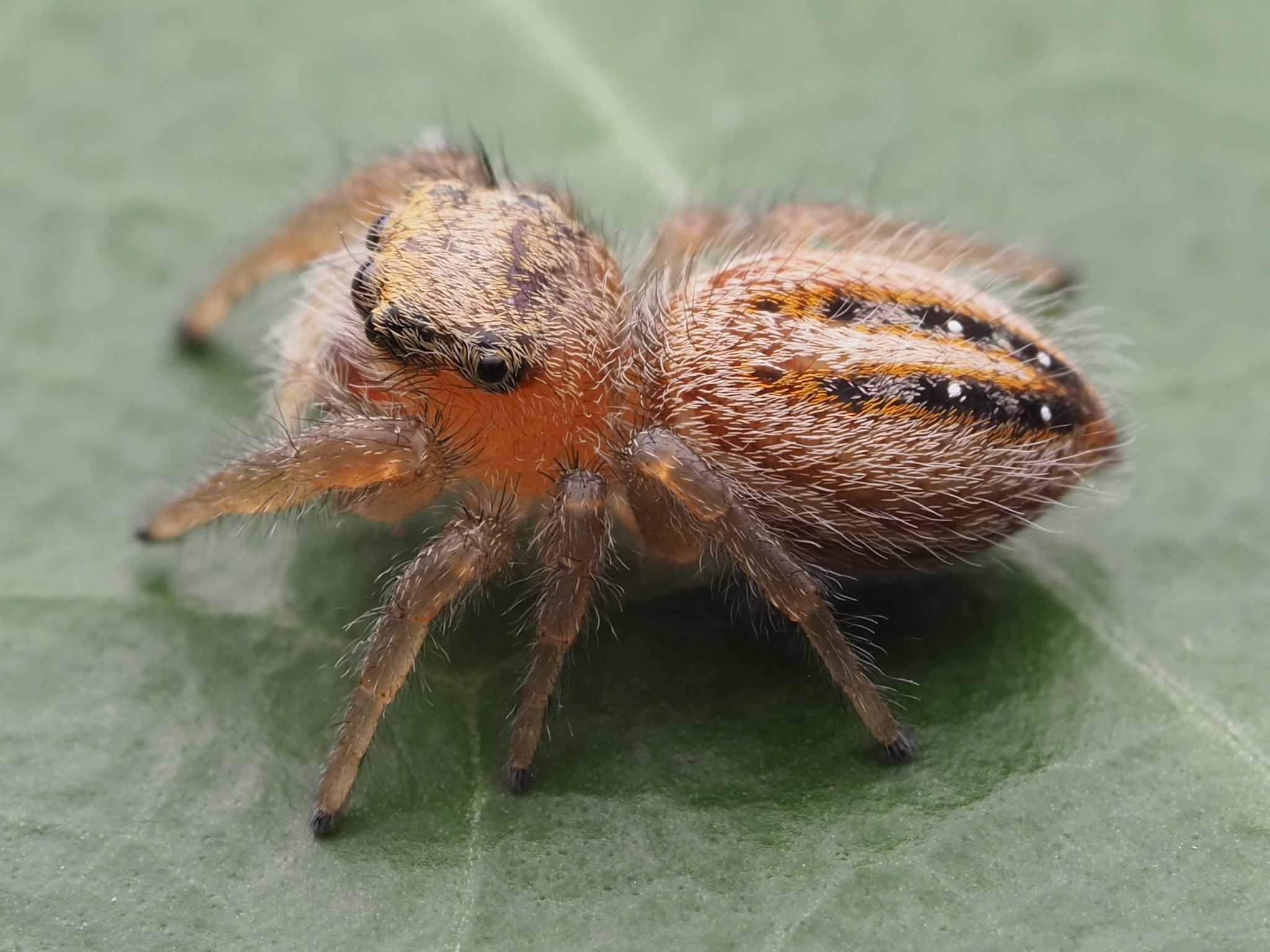
Immature female
