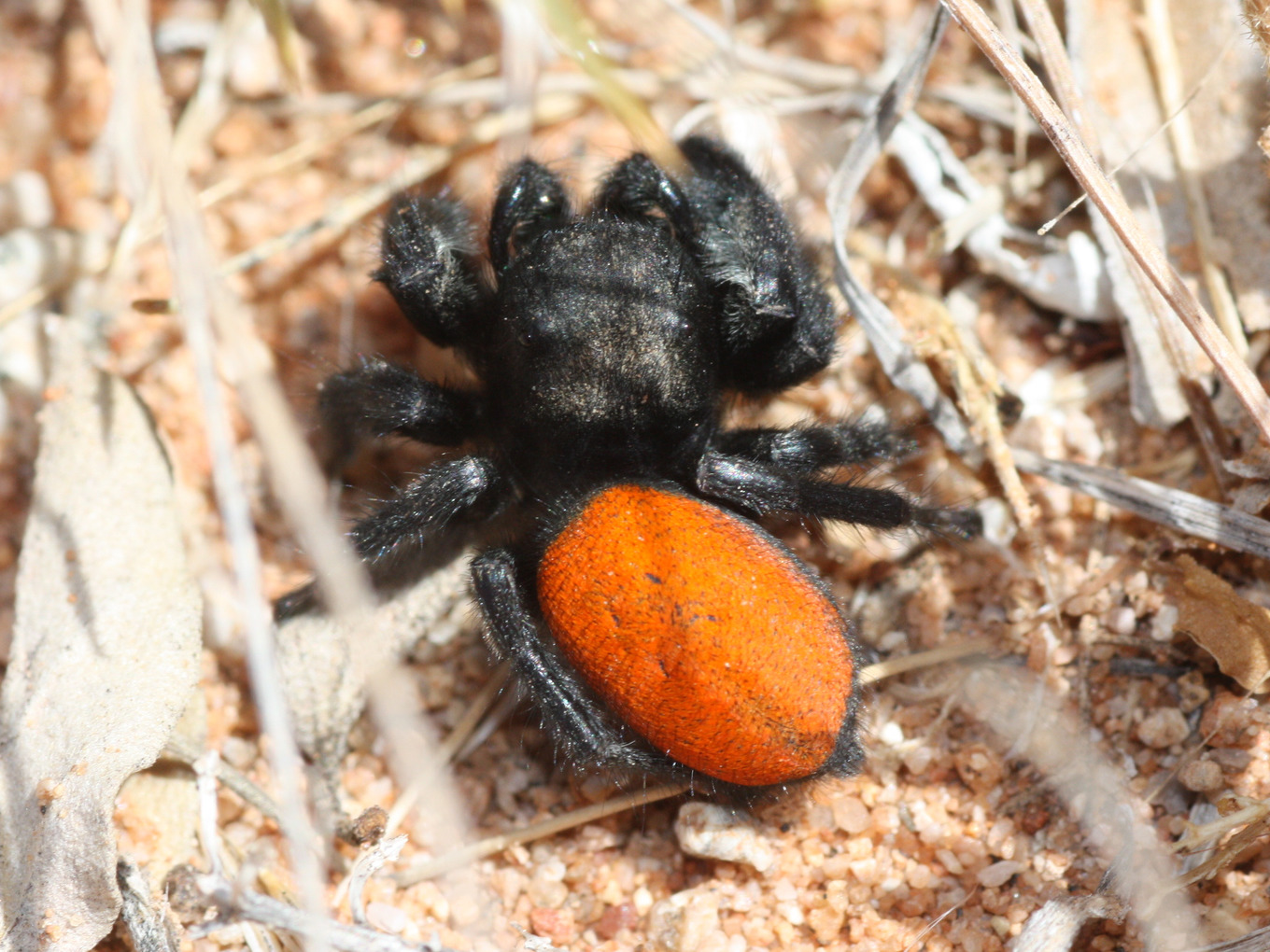

Scientific classification
- Kingdom: Animalia
- Phylum: Arthropoda
- Subphylum: Chelicerata
- Class: Arachnida
- Order: Araneae
- Infraorder: Araneomorphae
- Family: Salticidae
- Genus: Phidippus
- Species: P. ardens

Binomial name
- Phidippus ardens Peckham & Peckham, 1901

= Phidippus ardens =

Species of spider

Phidippus ardens is a species of jumping spider. It is found in the western United States and Mexico.
