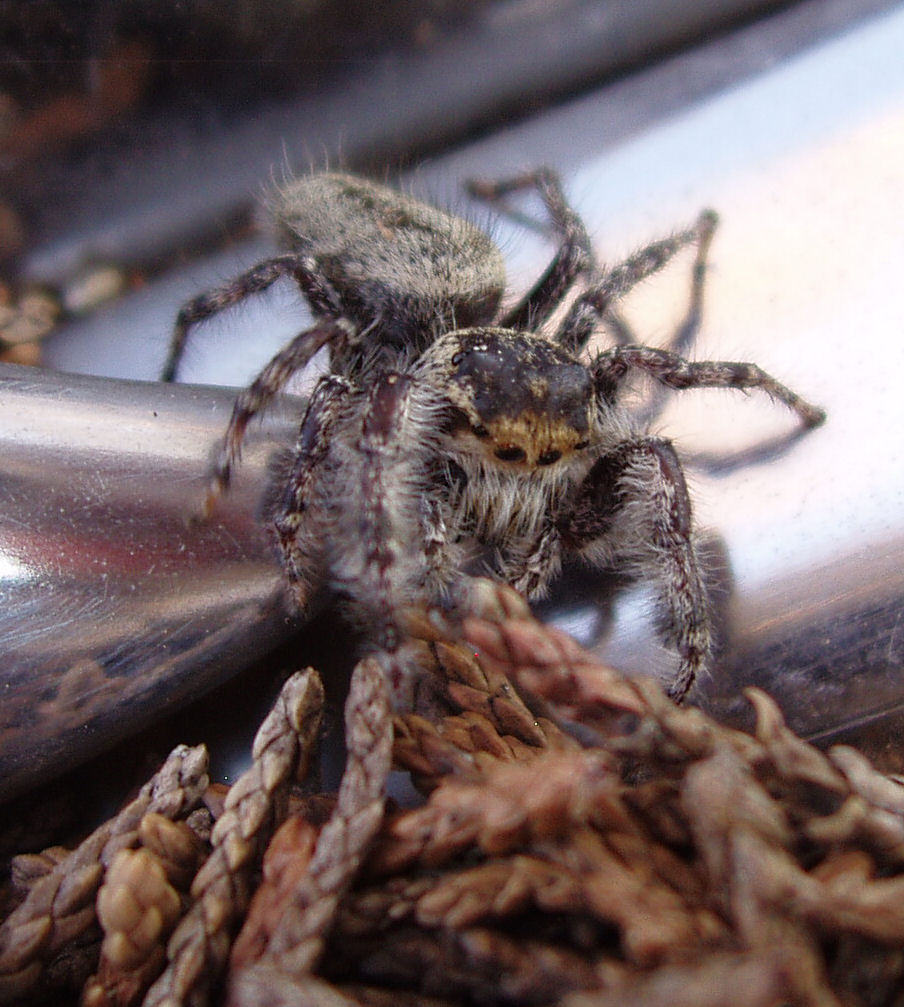
- Male

Scientific classification
- Kingdom: Animalia
- Phylum: Arthropoda
- Subphylum: Chelicerata
- Class: Arachnida
- Order: Araneae
- Infraorder: Araneomorphae
- Family: Salticidae
- Genus: Phidippus
- Species: P. asotus

Binomial name
- Phidippus asotus Chamberlin & Ivie, 1933

= Phidippus asotus =

Species of spider

Phidippus asotus is a species of jumping spiders in the family Salticidae. It is found in the United States and Mexico.
