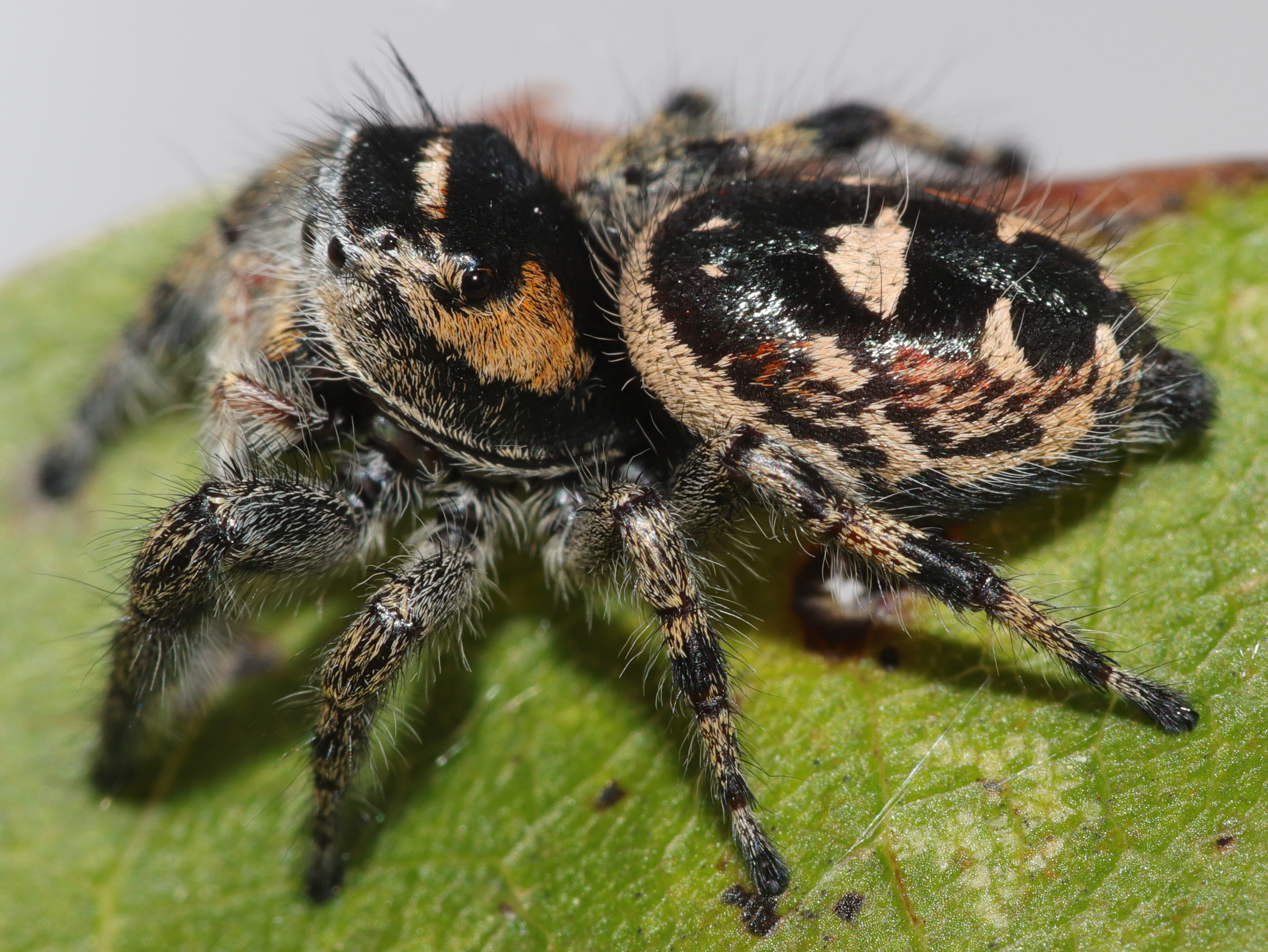
- Female
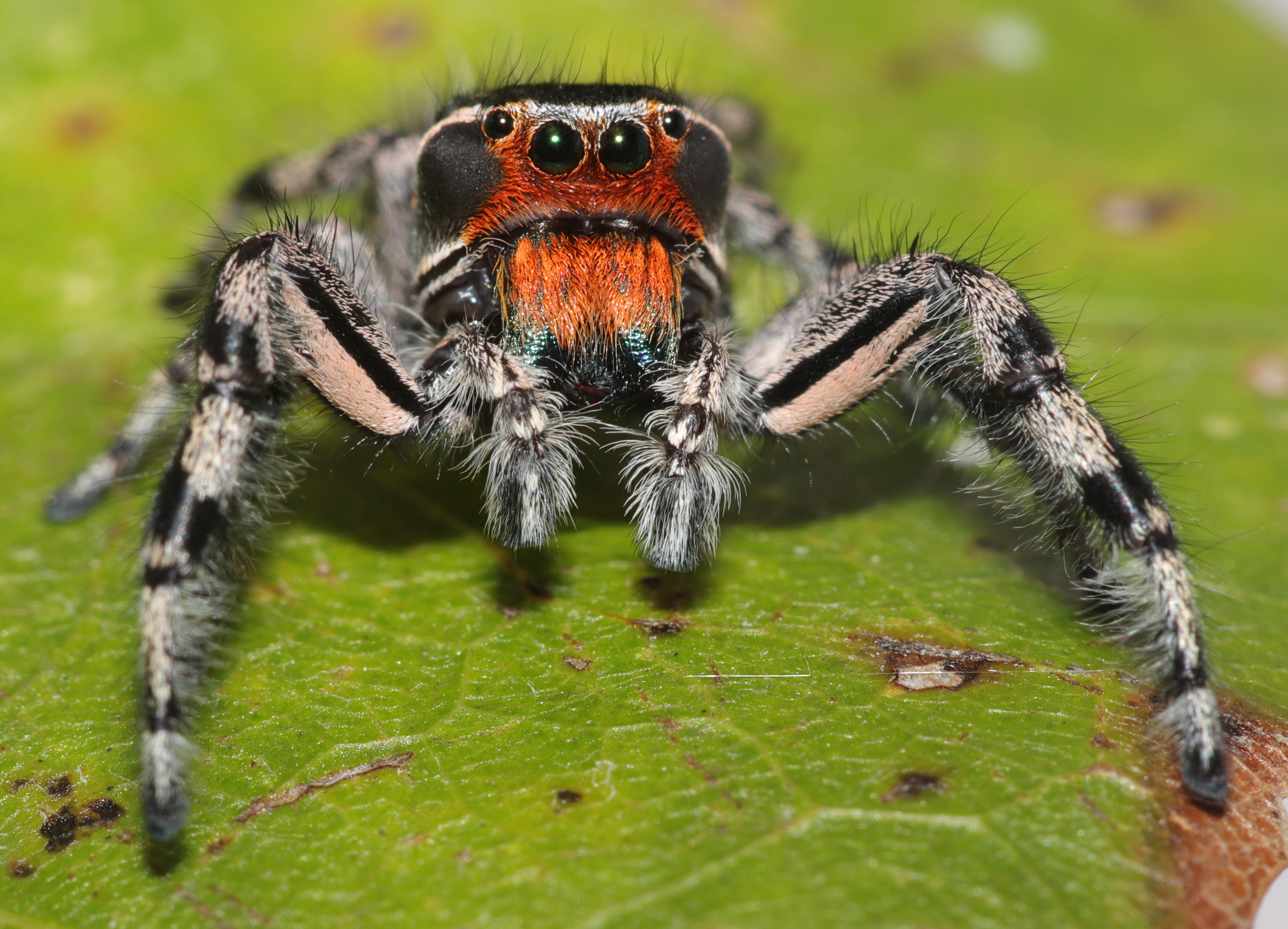
- Male

Scientific classification
- Kingdom: Animalia
- Phylum: Arthropoda
- Subphylum: Chelicerata
- Class: Arachnida
- Order: Araneae
- Infraorder: Araneomorphae
- Family: Salticidae
- Genus: Phidippus
- Species: P. adonis

Binomial name
- Phidippus adonis Edwards, 2004

= Phidippus adonis =

Species of spider

Phidippus adonis is a species of jumping spider found in Mexico.
