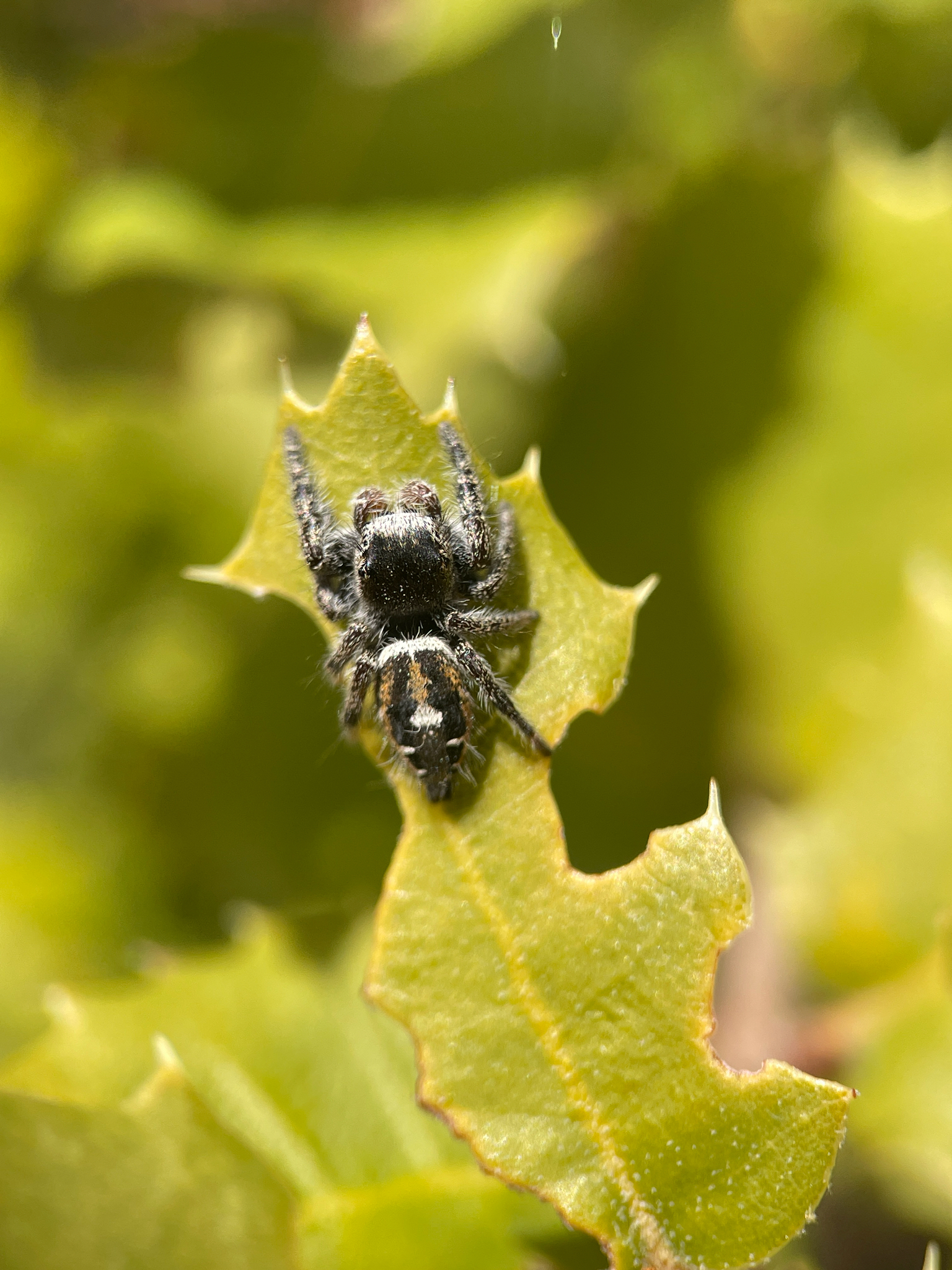

Scientific classification
- Kingdom: Animalia
- Phylum: Arthropoda
- Subphylum: Chelicerata
- Class: Arachnida
- Order: Araneae
- Infraorder: Araneomorphae
- Family: Salticidae
- Genus: Phidippus
- Species: P. concinnus

Binomial name
- Phidippus concinnus Gertsch, 1934

= Phidippus concinnus =

Species of arachnid

Phidippus concinnus is a species of jumping spider found in Idaho and California in the United States.

== Description ==
The outer layer of the carapace is reddish brown and covered evenly with fine black hairs. The carapace has white stripes on either side. The underside of the cephalothorax is light brown, while the legs are darker with scattered white scales. The chelicerae are reddish brown and not iridecent and covered with white hairs. Its abdomen is red with a broad, irregular black band, while the underside is gray.

In males, the pedipalps are light brown.

== Distribution ==
Phidippus concinnus spiders mature in the summer and occur in coniferous forest at higher elevations.
