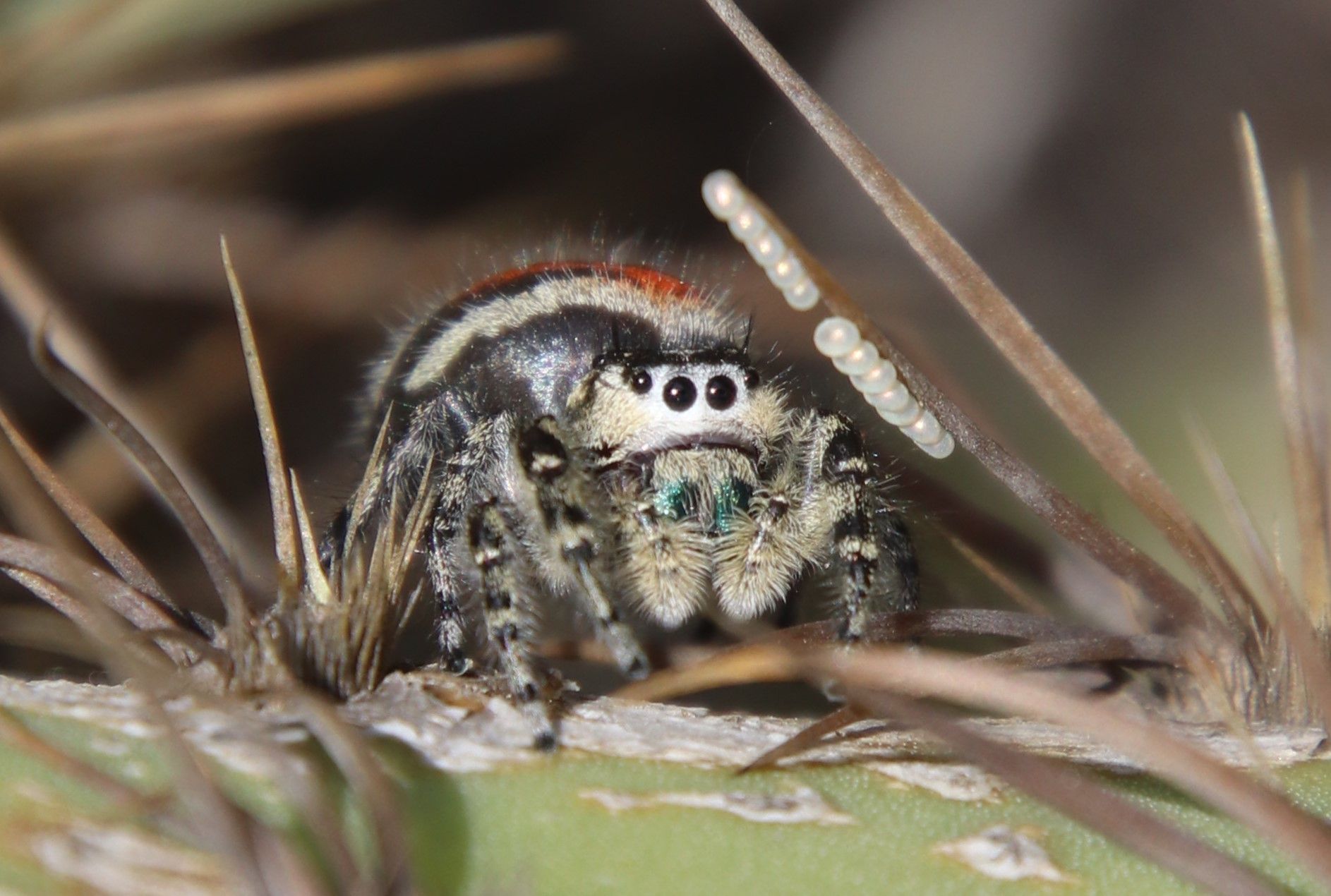
- Male

Scientific classification
- Kingdom: Animalia
- Phylum: Arthropoda
- Subphylum: Chelicerata
- Class: Arachnida
- Order: Araneae
- Infraorder: Araneomorphae
- Family: Salticidae
- Genus: Phidippus
- Species: P. phoenix

Binomial name
- Phidippus phoenix Edwards, 2004

= Phidippus phoenix =

Species of spider

Phidippus phoenix is a species of jumping spider in the family Salticidae. It is found in the United States and Mexico.
