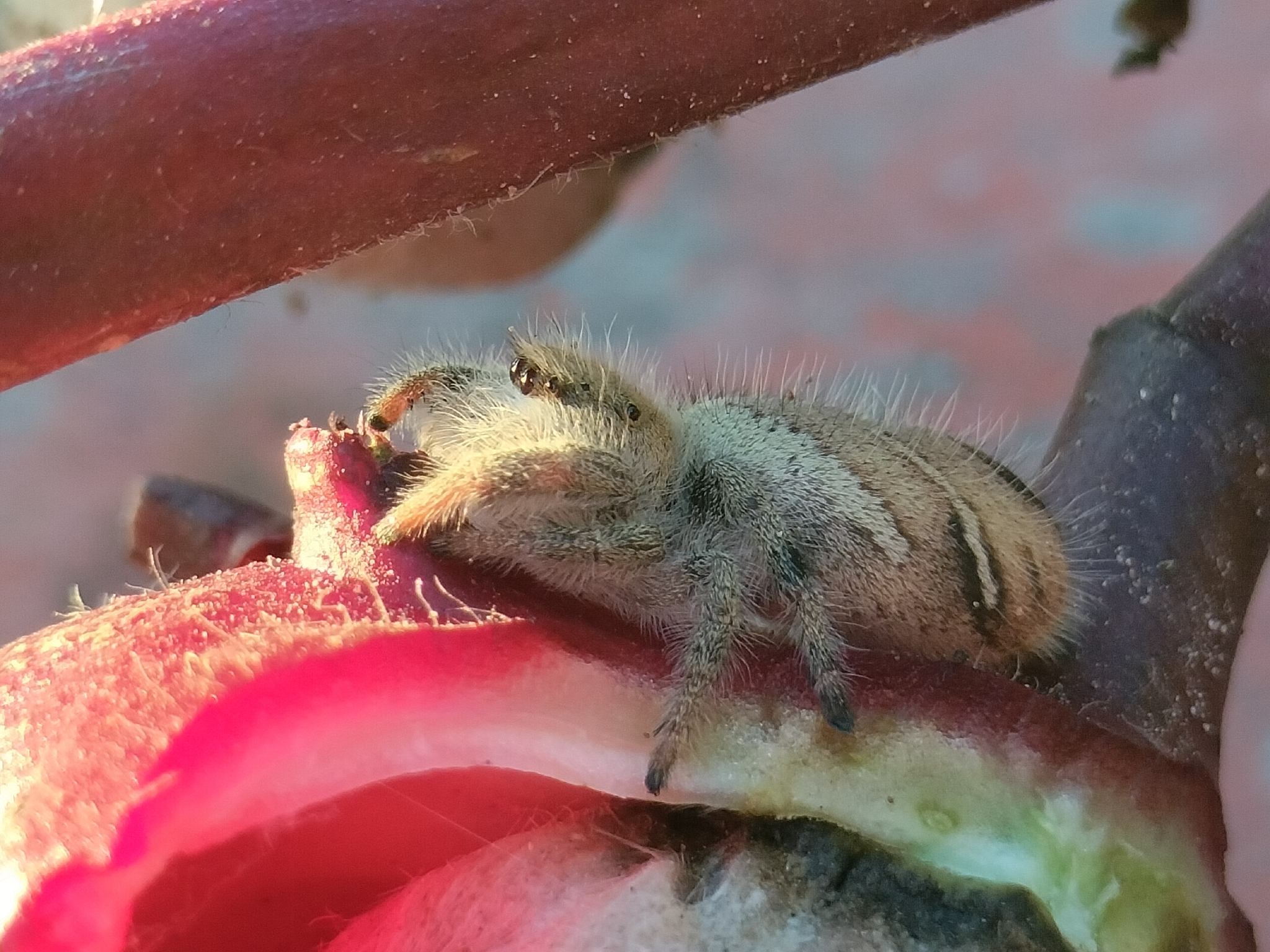
- Female

Scientific classification
- Kingdom: Animalia
- Phylum: Arthropoda
- Subphylum: Chelicerata
- Class: Arachnida
- Order: Araneae
- Infraorder: Araneomorphae
- Family: Salticidae
- Genus: Phidippus
- Species: P. tux

Binomial name
- Phidippus tux Pinter, 1970

= Phidippus tux =

Species of spider

Phidippus tux is a species of jumping spider. It is found in the southwestern United States and Mexico.
