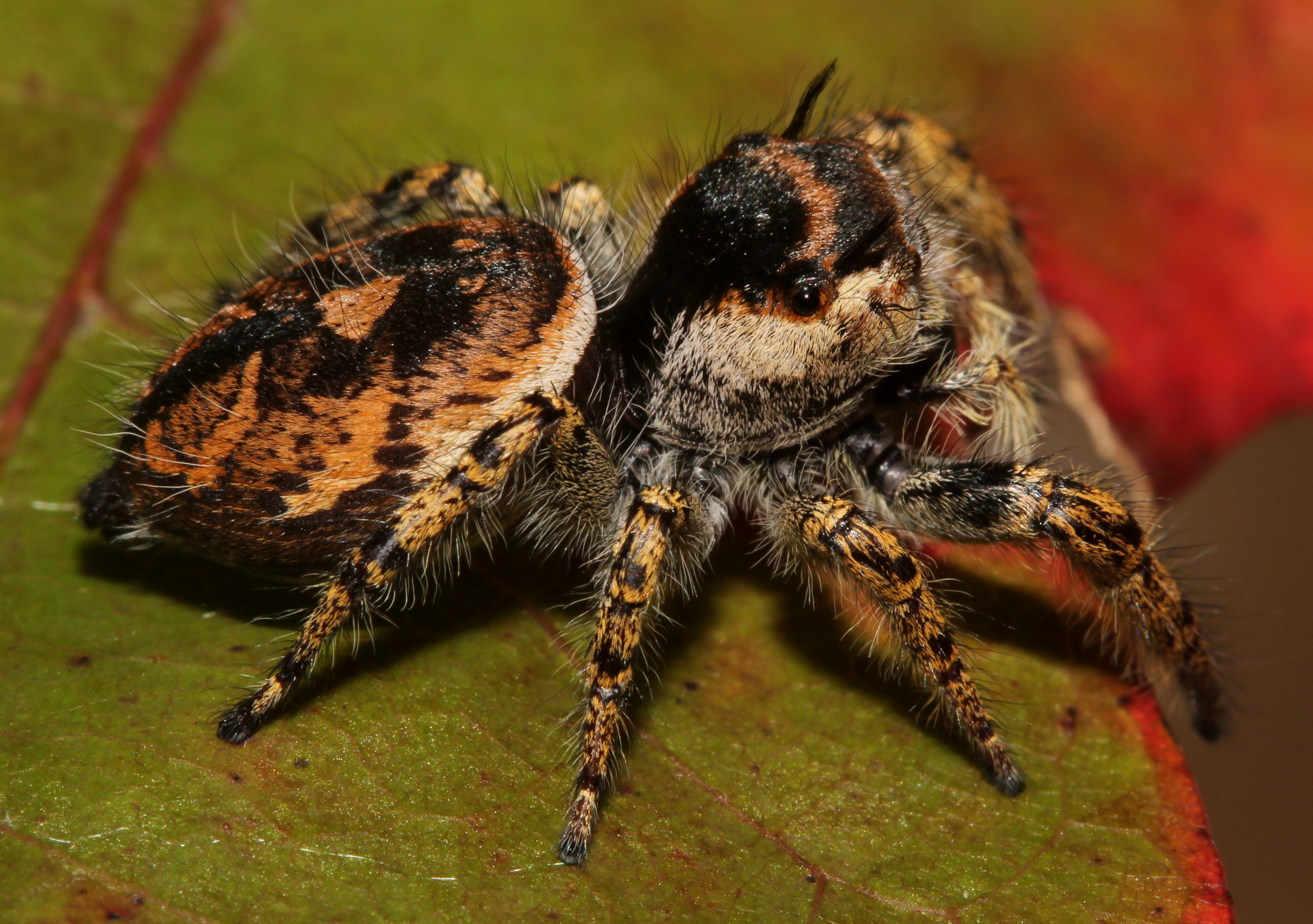
- Female
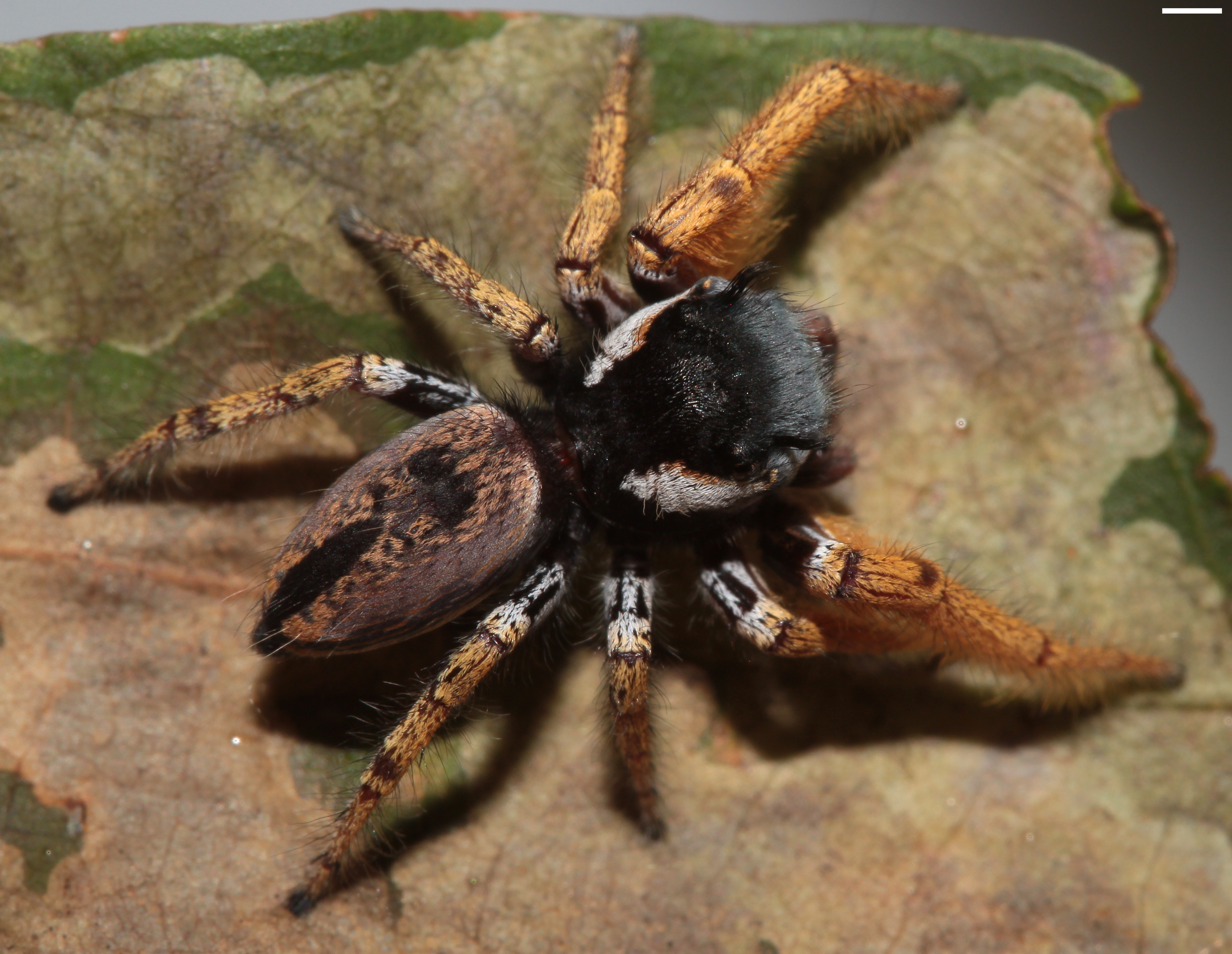
- Male

Scientific classification
- Kingdom: Animalia
- Phylum: Arthropoda
- Subphylum: Chelicerata
- Class: Arachnida
- Order: Araneae
- Infraorder: Araneomorphae
- Family: Salticidae
- Genus: Phidippus
- Species: P. arizonensis

Binomial name
- Phidippus arizonensis (Peckham, Peckham, 1883)

= Phidippus arizonensis =

Species of spider

Phidippus arizonensis is a spider in the family Salticidae ("jumping spiders"), in the infraorder Araneomorphae ("true spiders"). The distribution range of Phidippus arizonensis includes the United States and Mexico.
