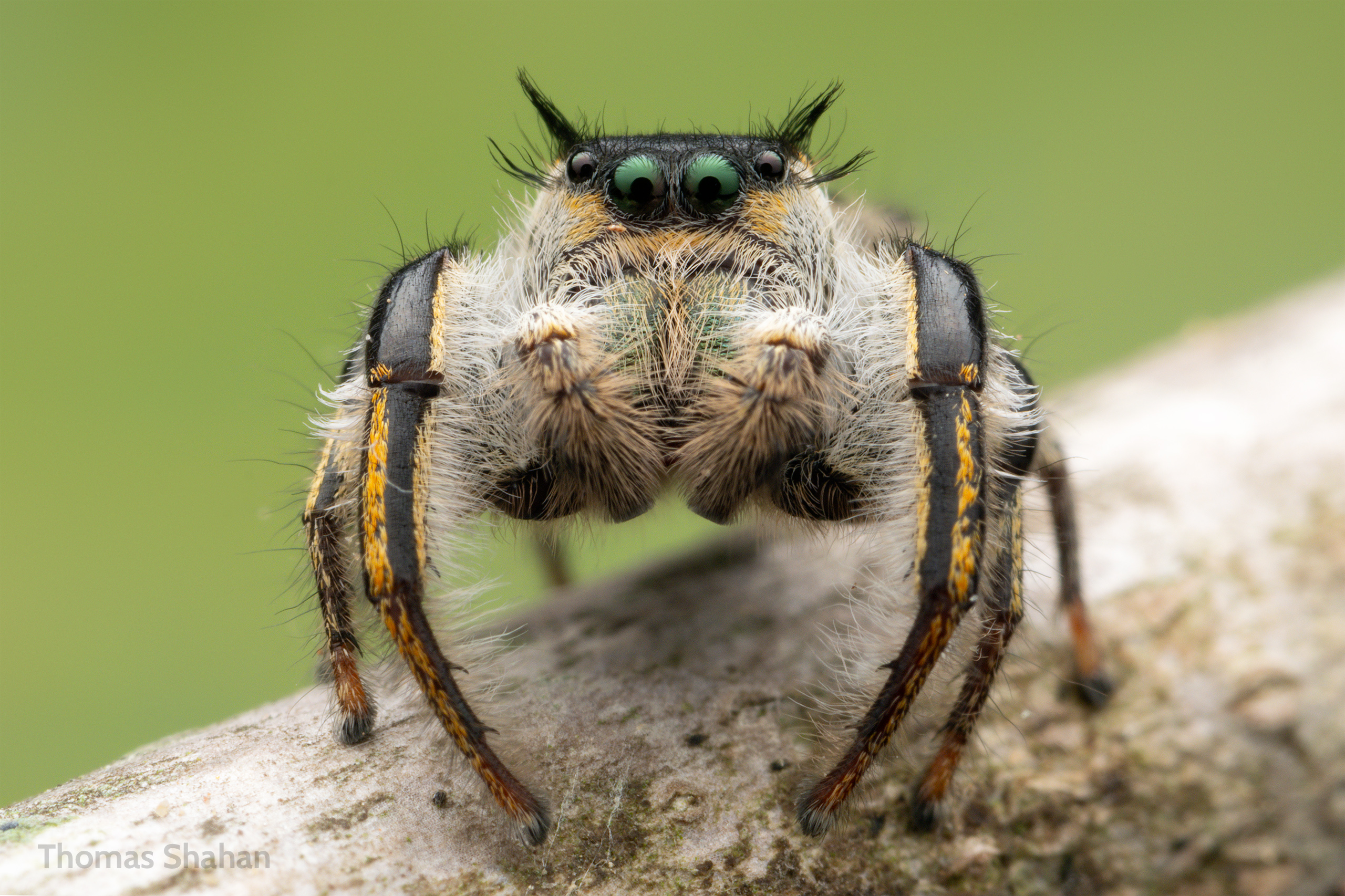
- Male

Scientific classification
- Kingdom: Animalia
- Phylum: Arthropoda
- Subphylum: Chelicerata
- Class: Arachnida
- Order: Araneae
- Infraorder: Araneomorphae
- Family: Salticidae
- Genus: Phidippus
- Species: P. insignarius

Binomial name
- Phidippus insignarius C. L. Koch, 1846

= Phidippus insignarius =

Species of spider

Phidippus insignarius is a species of jumping spider in the family Salticidae. It is found in the United States.

== Gallery ==
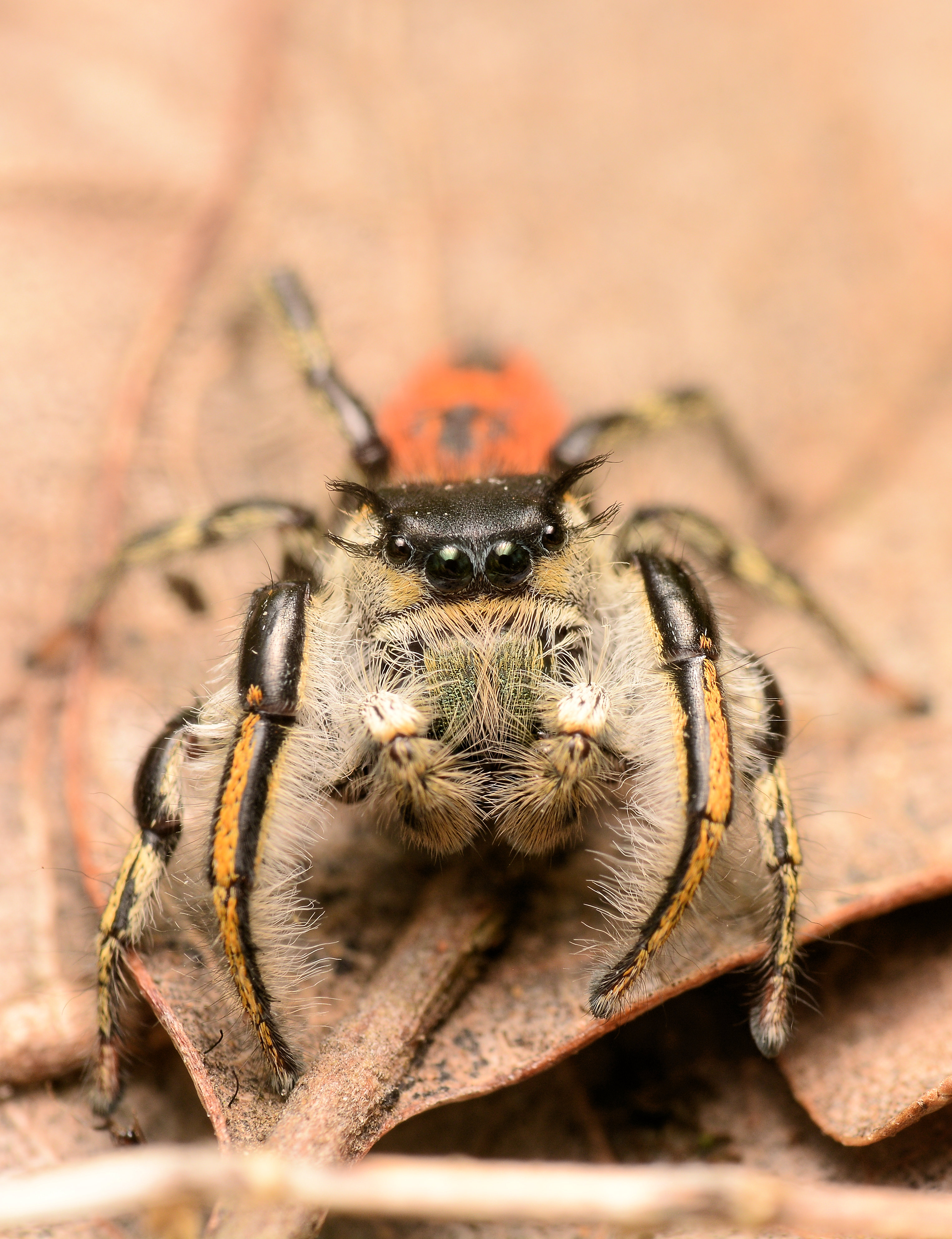
Male face

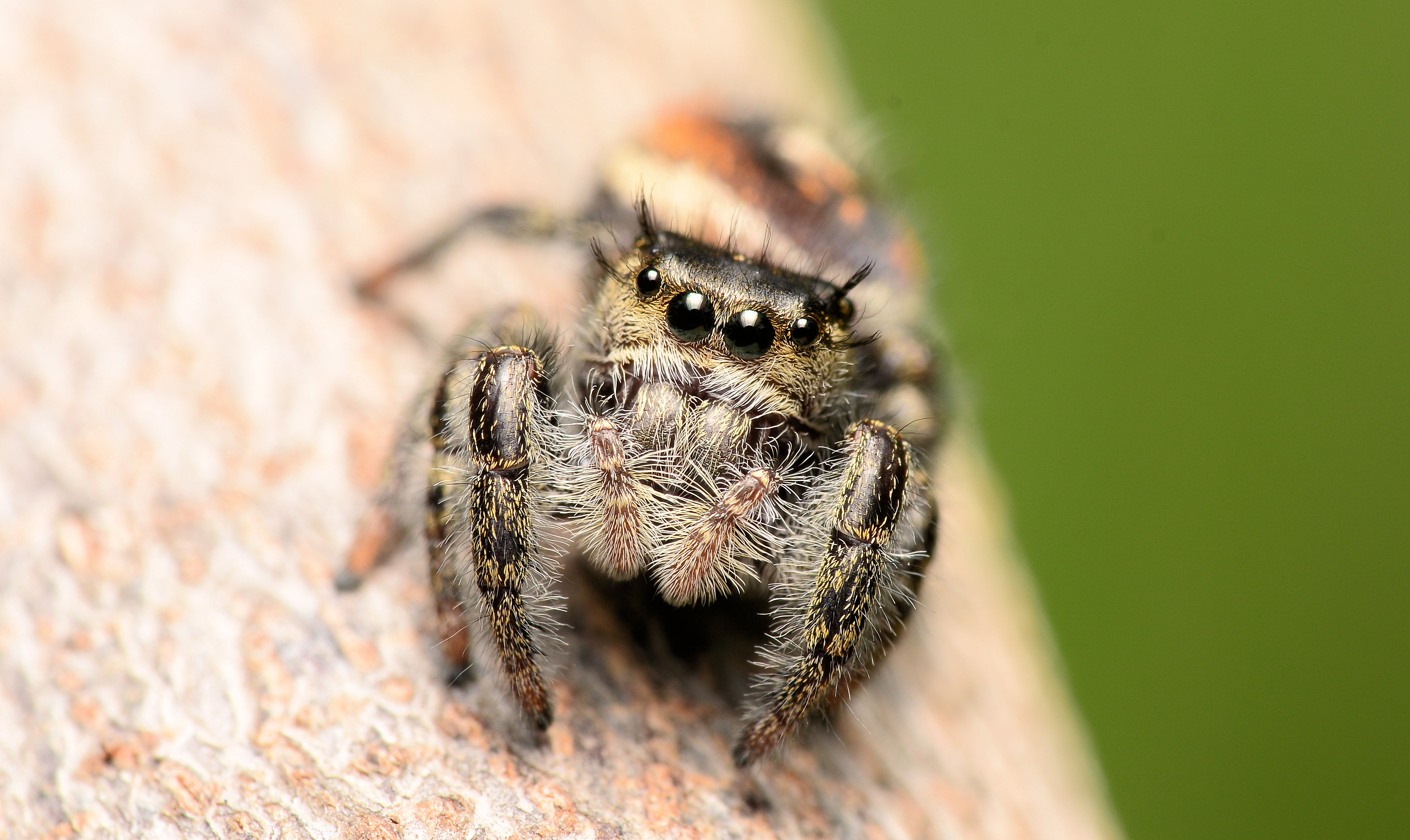
Female face

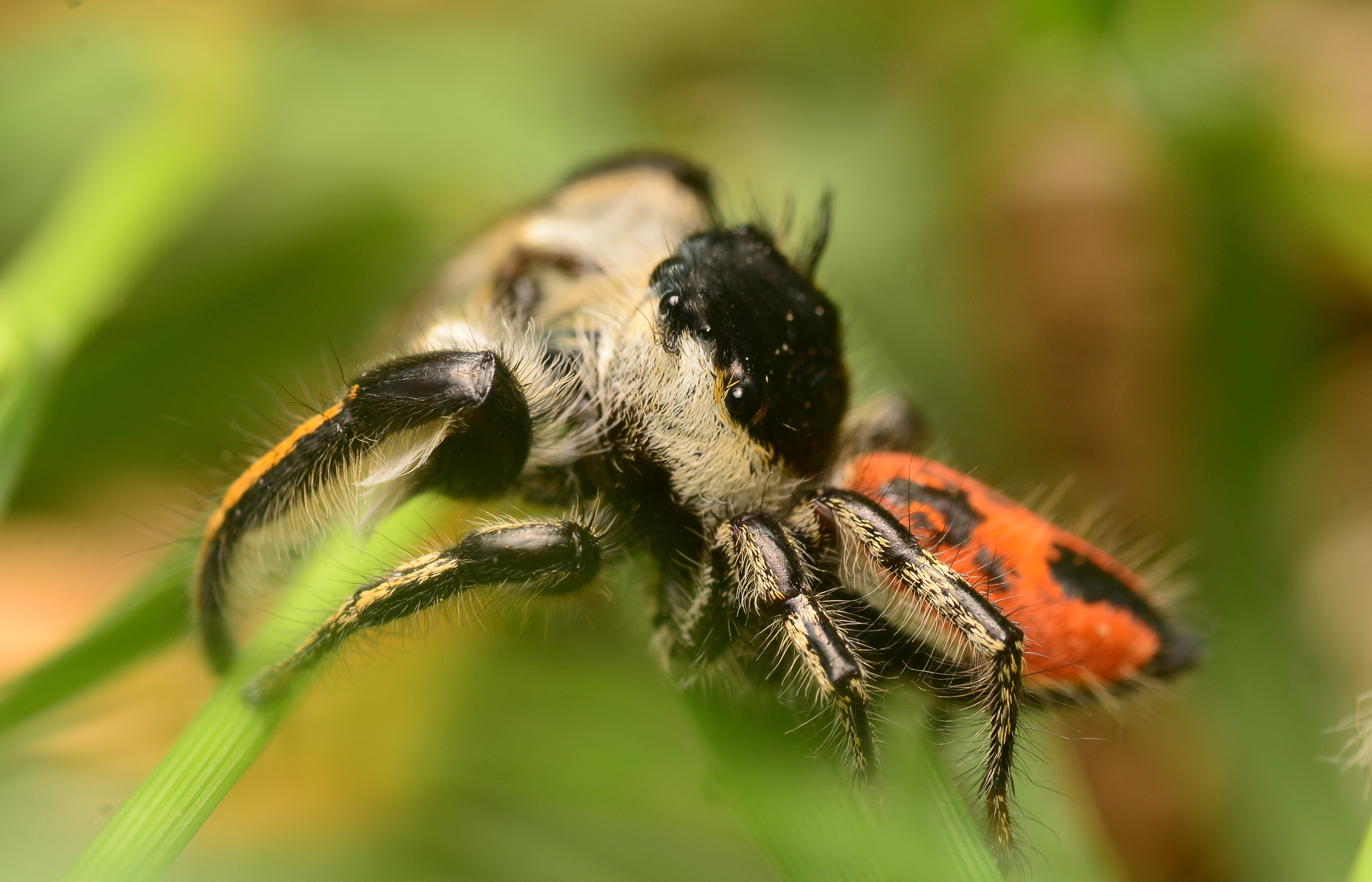
Male side

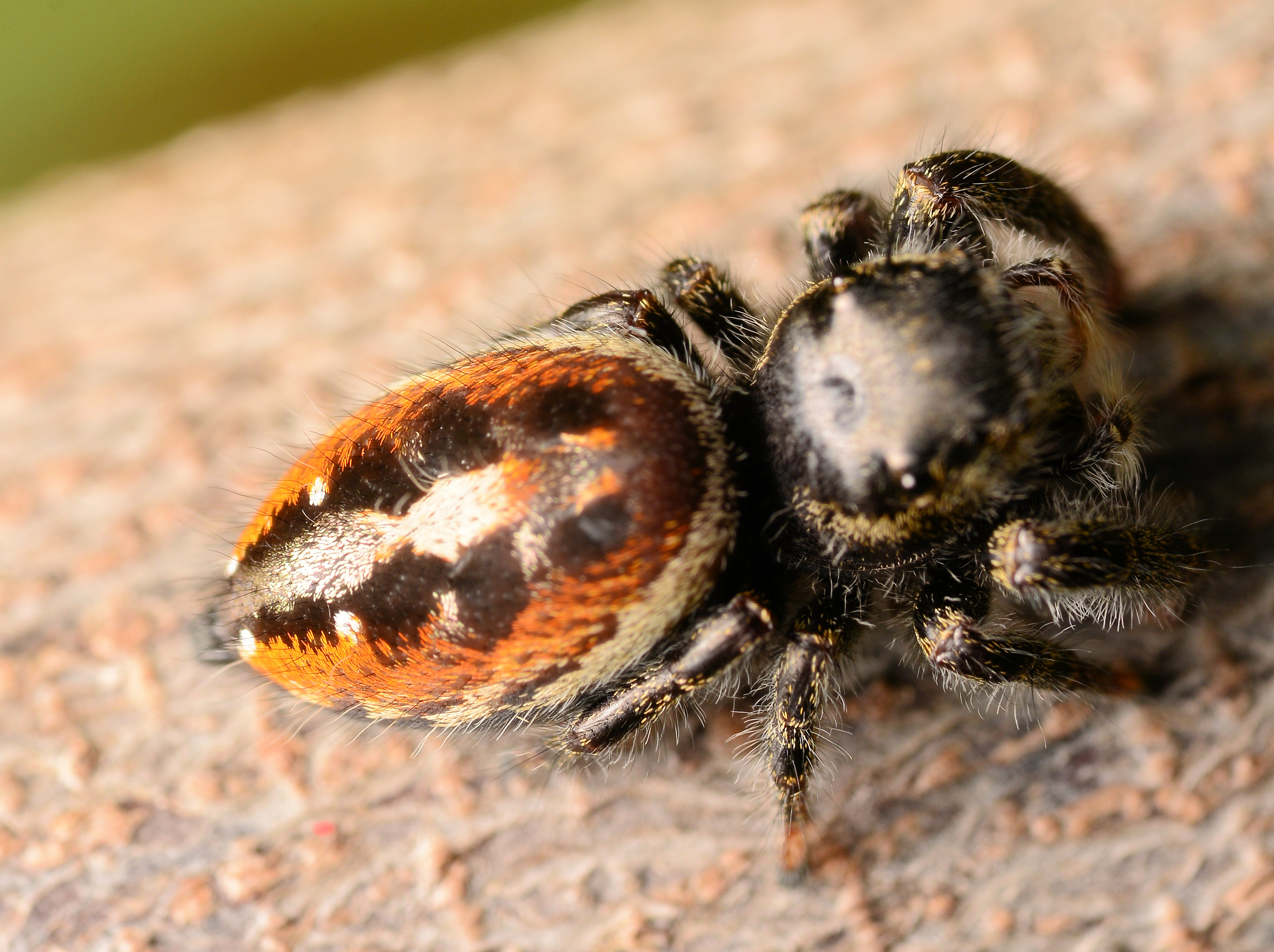
Female dorsal
