= Phidippus cerberus =

Scientific classification
- Kingdom: Animalia
- Phylum: Arthropoda
- Subphylum: Chelicerata
- Class: Arachnida
- Order: Araneae
- Infraorder: Araneomorphae
- Family: Salticidae
- Genus: Phidippus
- Species: P. cerberus

Binomial name
- Phidippus cerberus Edwards, 2004

Species of arachnid

Phidippus cerberus is a species of jumping spider found in Central Mexico.

== Description ==
Phidippus cerberus spiders are small and dark gray in color. The embolus of the palpal bulb in males resembles those of P. albulatus and P. maddisoni. The tip of the apical portion shows an incipient fork. The shape of the epigynum resembles that of P. cardinalis.

== Distribution ==
Phidippus cerberus spiders are typically found in high elevations in alpine meadows.
