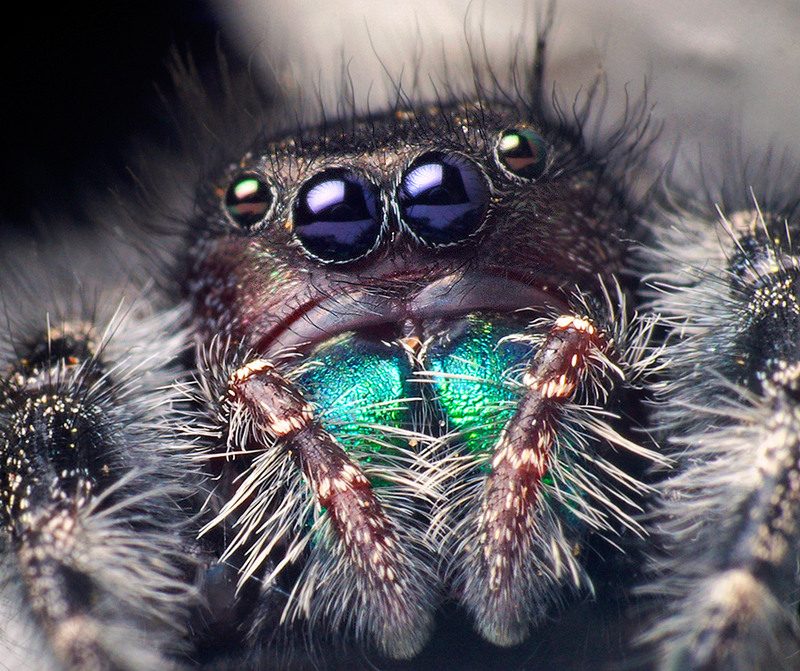
- Phidippus audax shows green chelicerae

Scientific classification
- Kingdom: Animalia
- Phylum: Arthropoda
- Subphylum: Chelicerata
- Class: Arachnida
- Order: Araneae
- Infraorder: Araneomorphae
- Family: Salticidae
- Subfamily: Salticinae
- Genus: Phidippus; C. L. Koch, 1846

Type species
- Attus audax Hentz, 1845

Species
- See text.

= Phidippus =

Genus of spiders in the family Salticidae

Phidippus is a genus in the family Salticidae (jumping spiders). Some of the largest jumping spiders inhabit this genus, and many species are characterized by their brilliant, iridescent green chelicerae. Phidippus is distributed almost exclusively in North America, with the exception of two exported species (Phidippus audax and Phidippus regius). As of January 2021, there were about 80 described species in the genus. Species previously described in Phidippus which are found in India and Bangladesh do not belong in this genus.

== Name ==
The genus name is likely derived from Cicero's speech Pro Rege Deiotaro (Speech in Behalf of King Deiotarus): Phidippus was a slave who was physician to King Deiotaros. Literally, the word means "one who spares horses" in Ancient Greek.

== Species ==
Bold Jumping Spider (Phidippus audax) with a cutworm (tribe Noctuini) and then lost to ants (Family Formicidae)

As of June 2025, the World Spider Catalog accepted the following species:

- Phidippus adonis Edwards, 2004 – Mexico
- Phidippus adumbratus Gertsch, 1934 – United States, Mexico
- Phidippus aeneidens Taczanowski, 1878 – Peru
- Phidippus albocinctus Caporiacco, 1947 – Guyana
- Phidippus albulatus F. O. Pickard-Cambridge, 1901 – Mexico
- Phidippus amans Edwards, 2004 – Mexico
- Phidippus apacheanus Chamberlin & Gertsch, 1929 – United States, Mexico, Cuba
- Phidippus ardens G. W. Peckham & E. G. Peckham, 1901 – United States, Mexico
- Phidippus arizonensis (G. W. Peckham & E. G. Peckham, 1883) – United States, Mexico
- Phidippus asotus Chamberlin & Ivie, 1933 – United States, Mexico
- Phidippus audax (Hentz, 1845) – North America, introduced to Hawaii, Azores, India (Nicobar Is.)
- Phidippus aureus Edwards, 2004 – United States
- Phidippus bengalensis Tikader, 1977 – India
- Phidippus bhimrakshiti Gajbe, 2004 – India
- Phidippus bidentatus F. O. Pickard-Cambridge, 1901 – United States to Costa Rica
- Phidippus birabeni Mello-Leitão, 1944 – Argentina
- Phidippus boei Edwards, 2004 – United States, Mexico
- Phidippus borealis Banks, 1895 – United States, Canada
- Phidippus calcuttaensis Biswas, 1984 – India
- Phidippus californicus G. W. Peckham & E. G. Peckham, 1901 – United States, Mexico
- Phidippus cardinalis (Hentz, 1845) – United States, Mexico, possibly Panama
- Phidippus carneus G. W. Peckham & E. G. Peckham, 1896 – United States, Mexico
- Phidippus carolinensis G. W. Peckham & E. G. Peckham, 1909 – United States, Mexico
- Phidippus cerberus Edwards, 2004 – Mexico
- Phidippus clarus Keyserling, 1885 – North America
- Phidippus comatus G. W. Peckham & E. G. Peckham, 1901 – Canada, United States, Mexico
- Phidippus concinnus Gertsch, 1934 – United States
- Phidippus cruentus F. O. Pickard-Cambridge, 1901 – Mexico
- Phidippus cryptus Edwards, 2004 – United States, Canada
- Phidippus dianthus Edwards, 2004 – Mexico
- Phidippus exlineae Caporiacco, 1955 – Venezuela
- Phidippus felinus Edwards, 2004 – United States
- Phidippus georgii G. W. Peckham & E. G. Peckham, 1896 – Mexico to El Salvador
- Phidippus guianensis Caporiacco, 1947 – Guyana
- Phidippus hingstoni Mello-Leitão, 1948 – Guyana
- Phidippus insignarius C. L. Koch, 1846 – United States
- Phidippus johnsoni (G. W. Peckham & E. G. Peckham, 1883) – Canada, United States, Mexico
- Phidippus kastoni Edwards, 2004 – United States
- Phidippus lynceus Edwards, 2004 – United States
- Phidippus maddisoni Edwards, 2004 – Mexico
- Phidippus majumderi Biswas, 1999 – Bangladesh
- Phidippus mimicus Edwards, 2004 – Mexico
- Phidippus morpheus Edwards, 2004 – United States, Mexico
- Phidippus mystaceus (Hentz, 1846) – United States
- Phidippus nikites Chamberlin & Ivie, 1935 – United States, Mexico
- Phidippus octopunctatus (G. W. Peckham & E. G. Peckham, 1883) – United States, Mexico
- Phidippus olympus Edwards, 2004 – United States
- Phidippus otiosus (Hentz, 1846) – United States
- Phidippus pacosauritus Edwards, 2020 – Mexico
- Phidippus phoenix Edwards, 2004 – United States, Mexico
- Phidippus pius Scheffer, 1905 – United States to Costa Rica
- Phidippus pompatus Edwards, 2004 – Mexico
- Phidippus princeps (G. W. Peckham & E. G. Peckham, 1883) – United States, Canada
  - Phidippus princeps pulcherrimus Keyserling, 1885 – United States
- Phidippus pruinosus G. W. Peckham & E. G. Peckham, 1909 – United States
- Phidippus punjabensis Tikader, 1974 – India
- Phidippus purpuratus Keyserling, 1885 – United States, Canada
- Phidippus putnami (G. W. Peckham & E. G. Peckham, 1883) – United States
- Phidippus regius C. L. Koch, 1846 – United States, Caribbean, introduced to Easter Is.
- Phidippus richmani Edwards, 2004 – United States
- Phidippus tenuis (Kraus, 1955) – El Salvador
- Phidippus texanus Banks, 1906 – United States, Mexico
- Phidippus tigris Edwards, 2004 – United States
- Phidippus toro Edwards, 1978 – United States, Mexico
- Phidippus tux Pinter, 1970 – United States, Mexico
- Phidippus tyrannus Edwards, 2004 – United States, Mexico
- Phidippus tyrrelli G. W. Peckham & E. G. Peckham, 1901 – North America
- Phidippus ursulus Edwards, 2004 – United States
- Phidippus venus Edwards, 2004 – Mexico
- Phidippus vexans Edwards, 2004 – United States
- Phidippus whitmani G. W. Peckham & E. G. Peckham, 1909 – United States, Canada
- Phidippus workmani G. W. Peckham & E. G. Peckham, 1901 – United States
- Phidippus yashodharae Tikader, 1977 – India (Andaman Is.)
- Phidippus zebrinus Mello-Leitão, 1945 – Argentina
- Phidippus zethus Edwards, 2004 – Mexico

== Misplaced species ==
Of the species listed above, several have been misplaced in the genus (according to Edwards' revision) but have yet to be transferred to other genera. These include:

- Phidippus aeneidens Taczanowski, 1878 – Peru
- Phidippus albocinctus Caporiacco, 1947 – Guyana
- Phidippus bengalensis Tikader, 1977 – India
- Phidippus bhimrakshiti Gajbe, 2004 – India
- Phidippus birabeni Mello-Leitão, 1944 – Argentina
- Phidippus calcuttaensis Biswas, 1984 – India
- Phidippus exlineae Caporiacco, 1955 – Venezuela
- Phidippus guianensis Caporiacco, 1947 – Guyana
- Phidippus hingstoni Mello-Leitão, 1948 – Guyana
- Phidippus majumderi Biswas, 1999 – Bangladesh
- Phidippus punjabensis Tikader, 1974 – India
- Phidippus tenuis (Kraus, 1955) – El Salvador
- Phidippus yashodharae Tikader, 1977 – India (Andaman Is.)
- Phidippus zebrinus Mello-Leitão, 1945 – Argentina

== Bibliography ==
- Gardner, B.T. (1965): Observations on Three Species of Phidippus Jumping Spiders (Araneae: Salticidae). Psyche 72:133-147 PDF (P. californicus = P. coccineus, P. apacheanus, P. octopunctatus = P. opifex)
- Ubick, D., Paquin, P., Cushing, P.E. and Roth, V. (editors) (2005): Spiders of North America: An Identification Manual. American Arachnological Society ISBN 0-9771439-0-2
- Edwards, G.B. (2004): Revision of the jumping spiders of the genus Phidippus (Araneae: Salticidae). Occasional Papers of the Florida State Collection of Arthropods 11: i-viii, 1–156, 350 figs.
