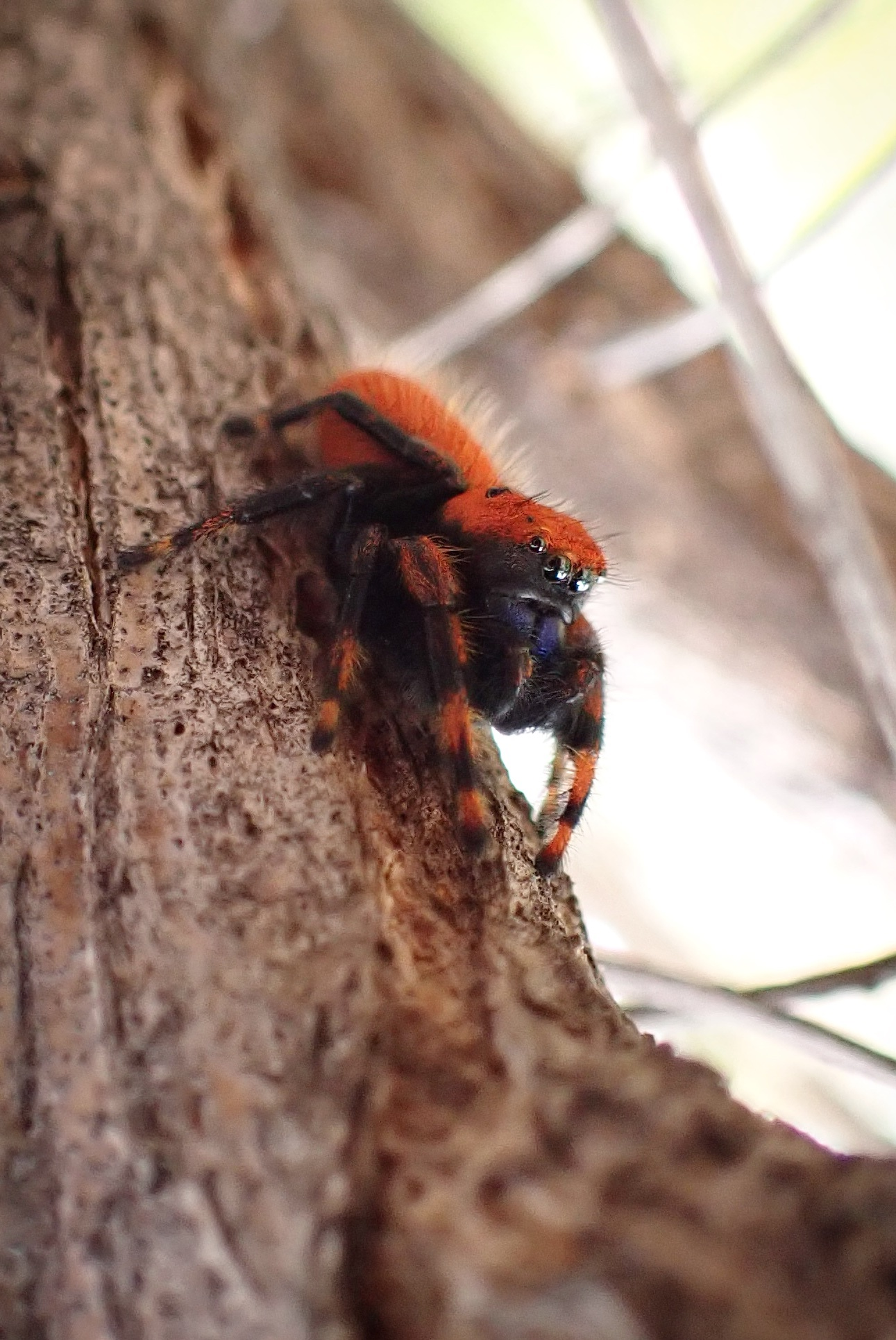

Scientific classification
- Kingdom: Animalia
- Phylum: Arthropoda
- Subphylum: Chelicerata
- Class: Arachnida
- Order: Araneae
- Infraorder: Araneomorphae
- Family: Salticidae
- Genus: Phidippus
- Species: P. nikites

Binomial name
- Phidippus nikites Chamberlin & Ivie, 1935

= Phidippus nikites =

Species of spider

Phidippus nikites is a species of jumping spider in the family Salticidae. It is found in the United States and Mexico.
