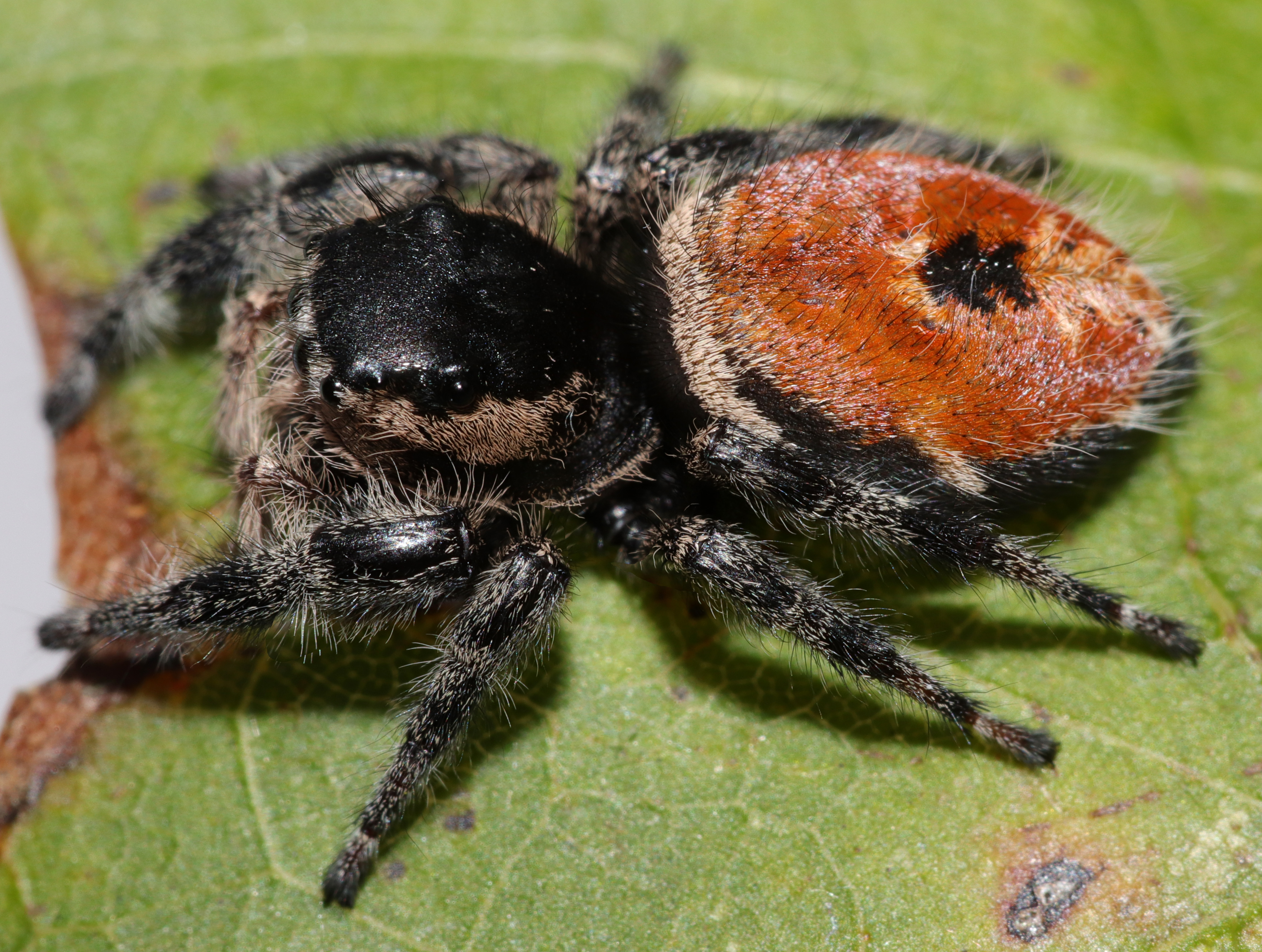
- Female
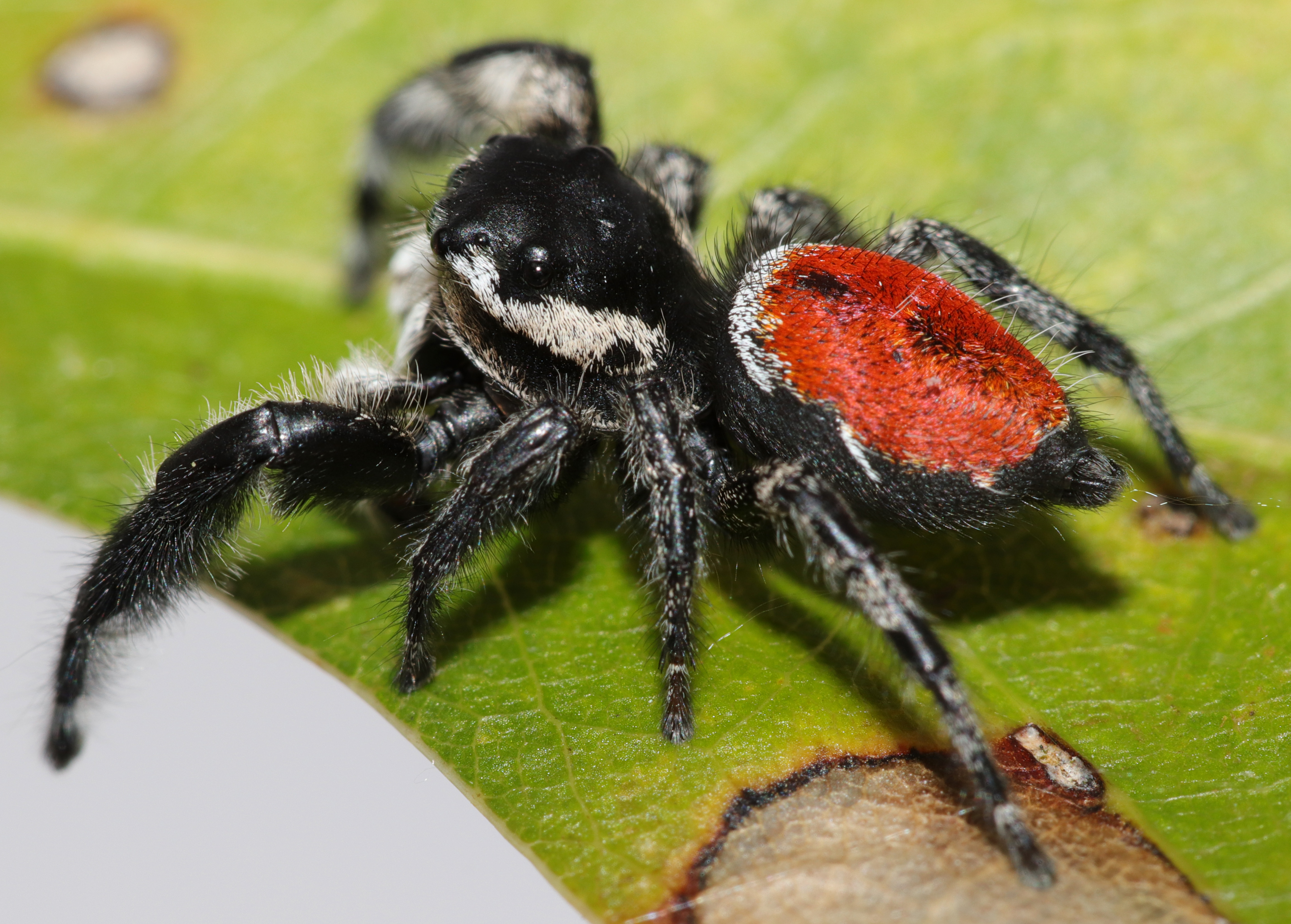
- Male

Scientific classification
- Kingdom: Animalia
- Phylum: Arthropoda
- Subphylum: Chelicerata
- Class: Arachnida
- Order: Araneae
- Infraorder: Araneomorphae
- Family: Salticidae
- Genus: Phidippus
- Species: P. zethus

Binomial name
- Phidippus zethus (Edwards, 2004)

= Phidippus zethus =

Species of spider

Phidippus zethus is a species of jumping spider (Salticidae) native to Mexico.
