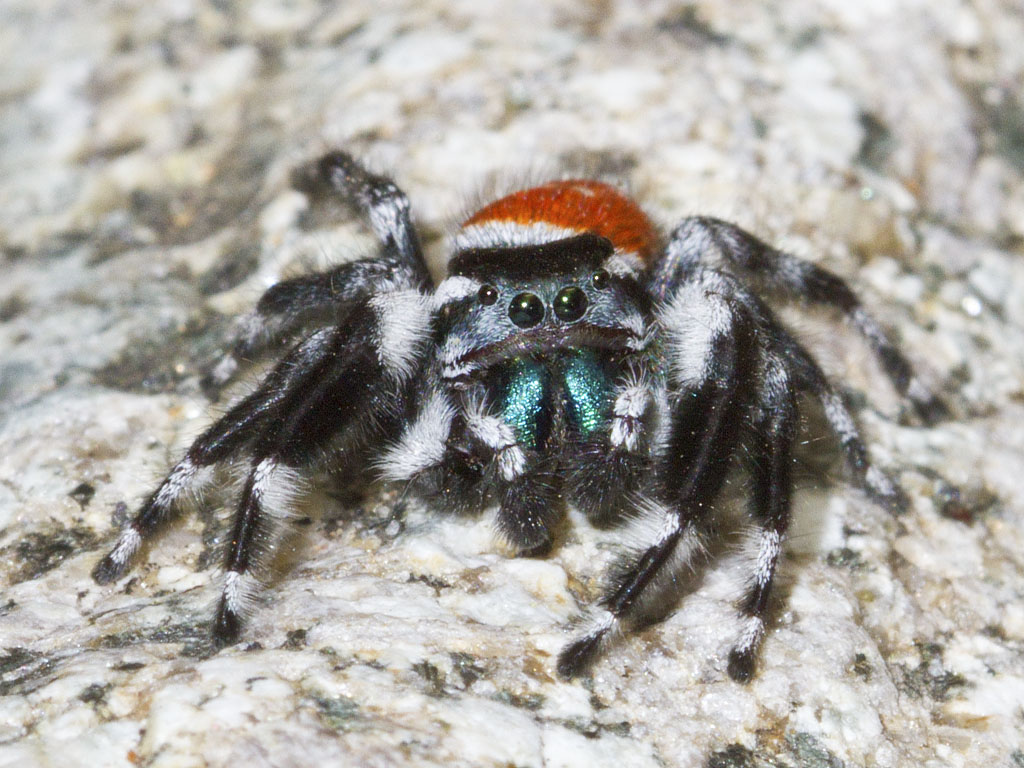
- Male Phidippus carneus in Pima County, Arizona

Scientific classification
- Kingdom: Animalia
- Phylum: Arthropoda
- Subphylum: Chelicerata
- Class: Arachnida
- Order: Araneae
- Infraorder: Araneomorphae
- Family: Salticidae
- Genus: Phidippus
- Species: P. carneus

Binomial name
- Phidippus carneus Peckham & Peckham, 1896

= Phidippus carneus =

Species of spider

Phidippus carneus is a species of jumping spider in the family Salticidae. It is found in the United States and Mexico.

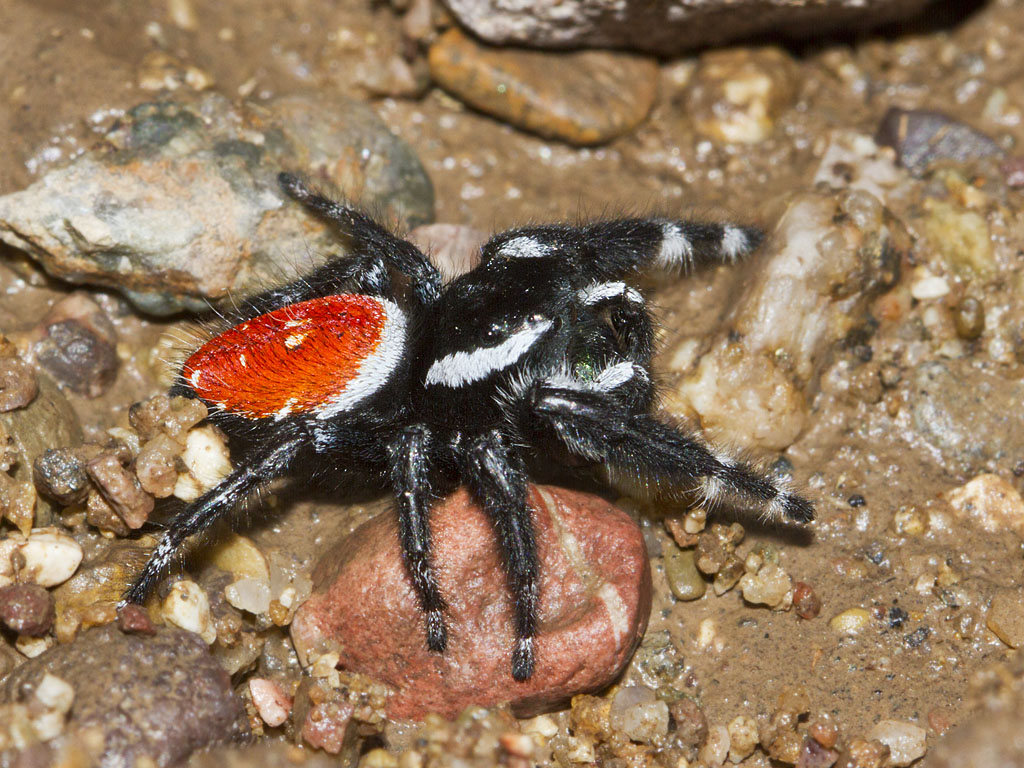
Male Phidippus carneus in Pima County, Arizona
