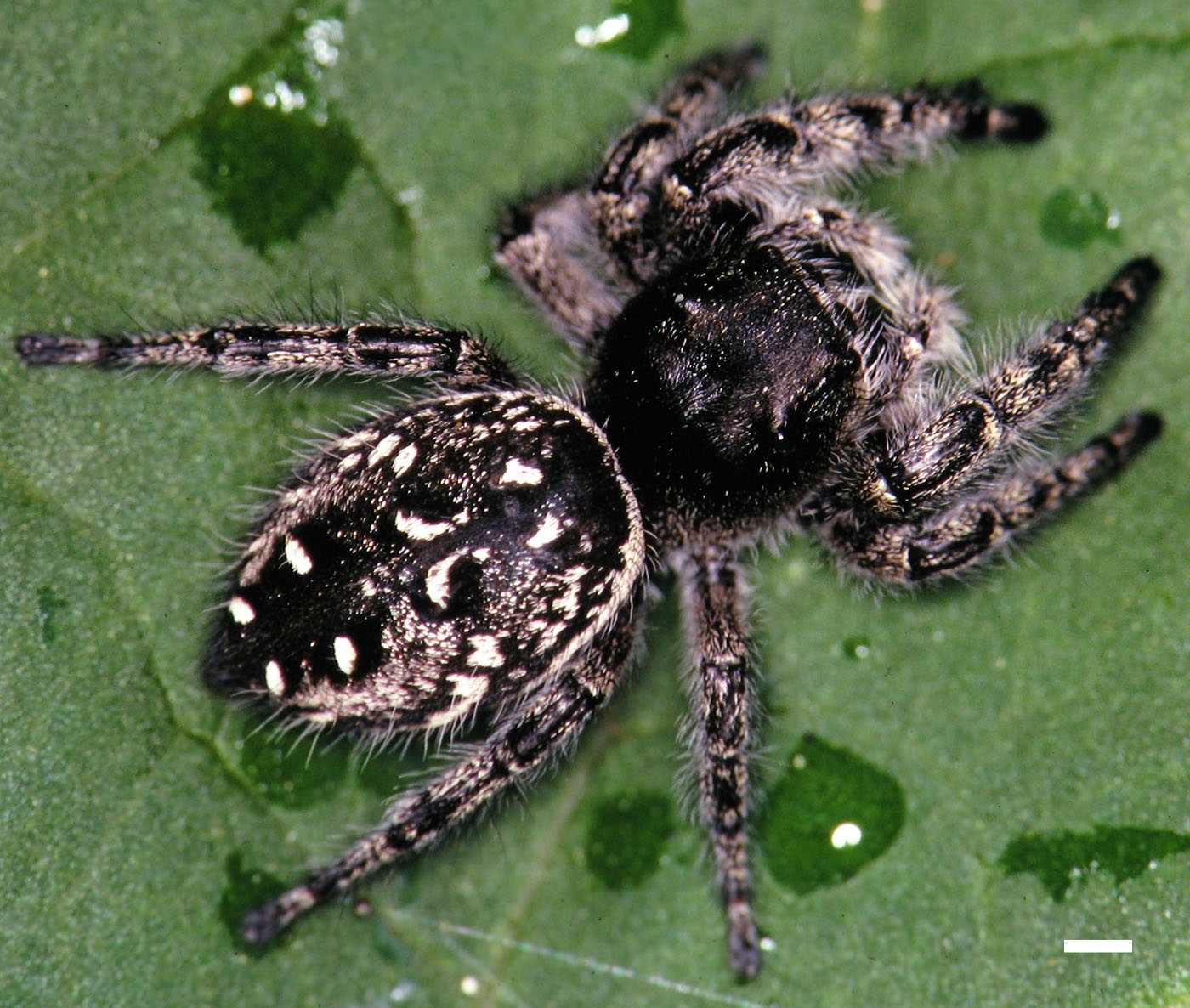

Scientific classification
- Kingdom: Animalia
- Phylum: Arthropoda
- Subphylum: Chelicerata
- Class: Arachnida
- Order: Araneae
- Infraorder: Araneomorphae
- Family: Salticidae
- Genus: Phidippus
- Species: P. purpuratus

Binomial name
- Phidippus purpuratus Keyserling, 1885

= Phidippus purpuratus =

Species of spider

Phidippus purpuratus, the marbled purple jumping spider, is a species of jumping spider in the family Salticidae. It is found in the United States and Canada.
