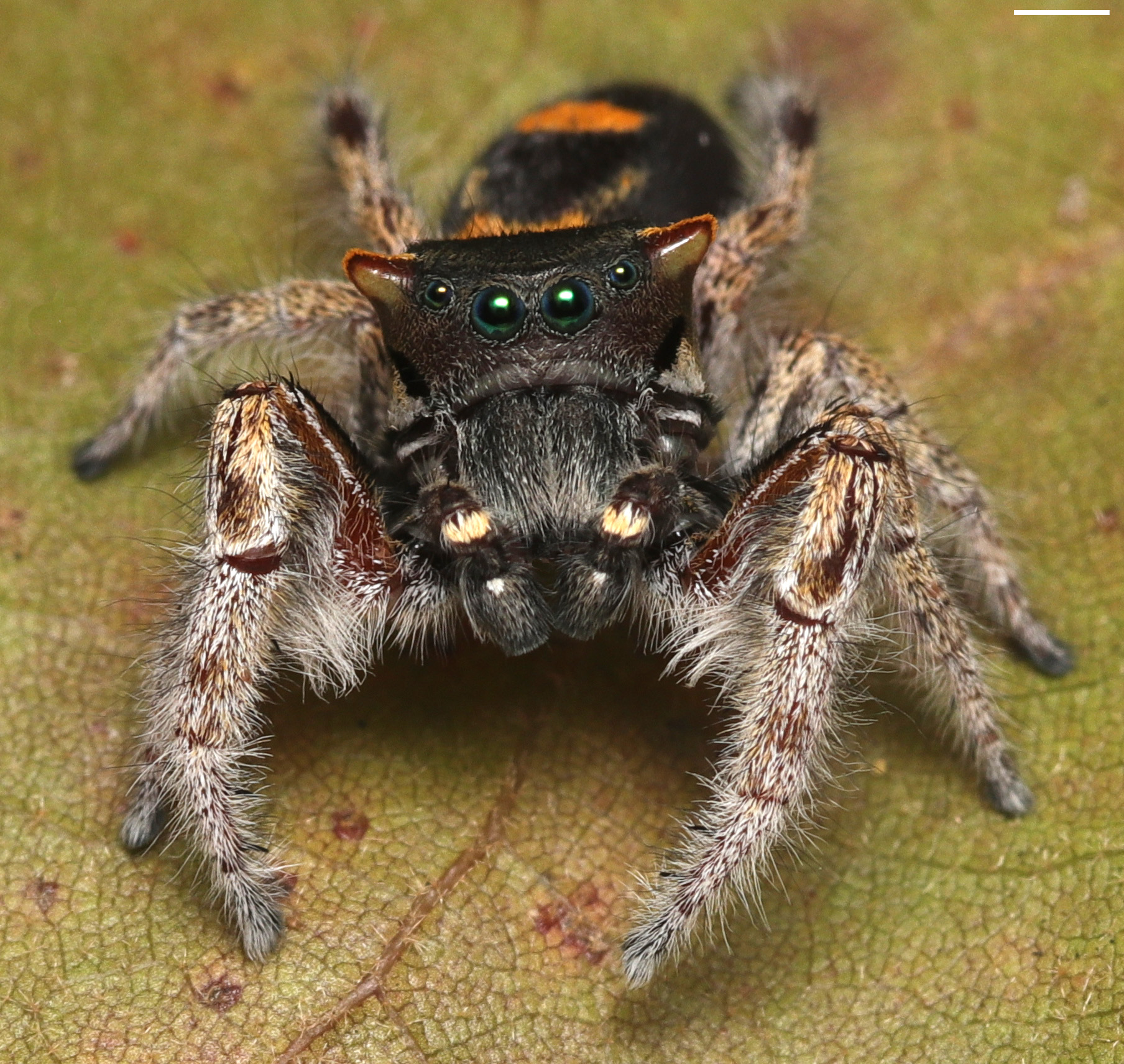
- Male in Mazatlán, Mexico

Scientific classification
- Kingdom: Animalia
- Phylum: Arthropoda
- Subphylum: Chelicerata
- Class: Arachnida
- Order: Araneae
- Infraorder: Araneomorphae
- Family: Salticidae
- Genus: Phidippus
- Species: P. pacosauritus

Binomial name
- Phidippus pacosauritus Edwards, 2020

= Phidippus pacosauritus =

Species of spider

Phidippus pacosauritus is a species of jumping spider found in Mexico. It was first described by G. B. Edwards in 2020.
