= List of spiders of Texas =

This is a list of all species that have been found in Texas, United States of America, as of July 17, 2006. It is taken from the Catalogue of Texas Spiders by D. Allen Dean, which was started in 1940. The list contains 980 species in 52 families.

== Archoleptonetidae ==
- Darkoneta garza

== Atypidae ==
- Sphodros paisano
- Sphodros rufipes

== Halonoproctidae ==
- Ummidia absoluta, syn. Ummidia audouini
- Ummidia audouini
- Ummidia beatula
- Ummidia celsa, syn. Ummidia funerea
- Ummidia funerea

== Euctenizidae ==
- Entychides arizonicus
- Eucteniza relata
- Myrmekiaphila comstocki
- Myrmekiaphila fluviatilis

== Euagridae ==
- Euagrus chisoseus
- Euagrus comstocki

== Theraphosidae ==
- Aphonopelma anax
- Aphonopelma armada
- Aphonopelma arnoldi
- Aphonopelma breenei
- Aphonopelma clarki
- Aphonopelma echinum
- Aphonopelma gurleyi
- Aphonopelma harlingenum
- Aphonopelma hentzi
- Aphonopelma heterops
- Aphonopelma hollyi
- Aphonopelma marxi
- Aphonopelma moderatum
- Aphonopelma rusticum
- Aphonopelma steindachneri
- Aphonopelma texense
- Aphonopelma waconum

== Agelenidae ==
- Agelenopsis aleenae
- Agelenopsis aperta
- Agelenopsis emertoni
- Agelenopsis kastoni
- Agelenopsis longistyla
- Agelenopsis naevia
- Agelenopsis spatula
- Barronopsis texana
- Coras alabama
- Coras medicinalis
- Tegenaria pagana
- Tegenaria domestica
- Tortolena dela

== Desidae ==
- Metaltella simoni

== Anyphaenidae ==
- Anyphaena celer
- Anyphaena dixiana
- Anyphaena fraterna
- Anyphaena lacka
- Anyphaena maculata
- Anyphaena pectorosa
- Hibana arunda
- Hibana cambridgei
- Hibana futilis
- Hibana gracilis
- Hibana incursa
- Hibana velox
- Lupettiana mordax
- Pippuhana calcar
- Wulfila albens
- Wulfila bryantae
- Wulfila saltabundus
- Wulfila tantillus

== Araneidae ==
- Acacesia hamata
- Acanthepeira cherokee
- Acanthepeira stellata
- Allocyclosa bifurca
- Araneus bicentarius
- Araneus bonsallae
- Araneus cavaticus
- Araneus cingulatus
- Araneus cochise
- Araneus detrimentosus
- Araneus gemma
- Araneus illaudatus
- Araneus juniperi
- Araneus kerr
- Araneus marmoreus
- Araneus miniatus
- Araneus nashoba
- Araneus nordmanni
- Araneus pegnia
- Araneus pratensis
- Araneus texanus
- Araneus thaddeus
- Araniella displicata
- Argiope argentata
- Argiope aurantia
- Argiope blanda
- Argiope trifasciata
- Colphepeira catawba
- Cyclosa berlandi
- Cyclosa caroli
- Cyclosa conica
- Cyclosa turbinata
- Cyclosa walckenaeri
- Eriophora edax
- Eriophora ravilla
- Eustala anastera
- Eustala bifida
- Eustala brevispina
- Eustala cameronensis
- Eustala cepina
- Eustala clavispina
- Eustala devia
- Eustala emertoni
- Gasteracantha cancriformis
- Gea heptagon
- Hypsosinga funebris
- Hypsosinga rubens
- Kaira alba
- Kaira altiventer
- Kaira hiteae
- Larinia directa
- Larinioides cornutus
- Larinioides patagiatus
- Larinioides sclopetarius
- Mangora calcarifera
- Mangora fascialata
- Mangora gibberosa
- Mangora maculata
- Mangora placida
- Mangora spiculata
- Mastophora alvareztoroi
- Mastophora cornigera
- Mastophora leucabulba
- Mastophora phrynosoma
- Mastophora stowei
- Mecynogea lemniscata
- Metazygia wittfeldae
- Metazygia zilloides
- Metepeira arizonica
- Metepeira comanche
- Metepeira foxi
- Metepeira labyrinthea
- Metepeira minima
- Micrathena gracilis
- Micrathena mitrata
- Micrathena sagittata
- Neoscona arabesca
- Neoscona crucifera
- Neoscona domiciliorum
- Neoscona nautica
- Neoscona oaxacensis
- Neoscona utahana
- Ocrepeira ectypa
- Ocrepeira georgia
- Ocrepeira globosa
- Ocrepeira redempta
- Scoloderus nigriceps
- Verrucosa arenata
- Wagneriana tauricornis

== Caponiidae ==
- Orthonops lapanus
- Tarsonops systematicus

== Clubionidae ==
- Clubiona abboti
- Clubiona adjacens
- Clubiona catawba
- Clubiona kagani
- Clubiona kiowa
- Clubiona maritima
- Clubiona pygmaea
- Elaver chisosa
- Elaver dorotheae
- Elaver excepta
- Elaver mulaiki
- Elaver texana

== Corinnidae ==
- Castianeira alteranda
- Castianeira amoena
- Castianeira crocata
- Castianeira cubana
- Castianeira descripta
- Castianeira gertschi
- Castianeira longipalpa
- Castianeira occidens
- Castianeira peregrina
- Castianeira trilineata
- Falconina gracilis
- Mazax kaspari
- Mazax pax
- Meriola decepta
- Scotinella formica (syn. Phruronellus formica)
- Phrurolithus apertus
- Phrurolithus callidus
- Phrurolithus emertoni
- Phrurolithus leviculus
- Phrurotimpus alarius
- Phrurotimpus alarius
- Phrurotimpus borealis
- Scotinella fratrella
- Septentrinna bicalcarata
- Trachelas mexicanus
- Trachelas similis
- Trachelas tranquillus
- Trachelas volutus

== Ctenidae ==
- Anahita punctulata
- Ctenus valverdiensis
- Leptoctenus byrrhus

== Dictynidae ==
- Argennina unica
- Brommella lactea
- Dictyna annexa
- Dictyna bellans
- Dictyna bostoniensis
- Dictyna calcarata
- Dictyna cholla
- Dictyna coloradensis
- Dictyna foliacea
- Dictyna formidolosa
- Dictyna personata
- Dictyna secuta
- Dictyna sylvania
- Dictyna terrestris
- Dictyna volucripes
- Emblyna callida
- Emblyna consulta
- Emblyna cruciata
- Emblyna evicta
- Emblyna hentzi
- Emblyna iviei
- Emblyna melva
- Emblyna orbiculata
- Emblyna reticulata
- Emblyna roscida
- Emblyna stulta
- Emblyna sublata
- Lathys delicatula
- Lathys maculina
- Mallos blandus
- Mallos pallidus
- Phantyna bicornis
- Phantyna mulegensis
- Phantyna provida
- Phantyna segregata
- Thallumetus pineus
- Tivyna petrunkevitchi
- Tricholathys knulli

== Diguetidae ==
- Diguetia albolineata
- Diguetia canities
- Diguetia canities
- Diguetia imperiosa

== Dysderidae ==
- Dysdera crocata

== Filistatidae ==
- Filistatinella crassipalpis
- Filistatoides insignis
- Kukulcania arizonica
- Kukulcania hibernalis

== Gnaphosidae ==
- Callilepis chisos
- Callilepis gertschi
- Callilepis imbecilla
- Camillina pulchra
- Cesonia bilineata
- Cesonia sincera
- Drassodes gosiutus
- Drassodes saccatus
- Drassyllus antonito
- Drassyllus aprilinus
- Drassyllus cerrus
- Drassyllus covensis
- Drassyllus creolus
- Drassyllus dixinus
- Drassyllus dromeus
- Drassyllus gynosaphes
- Drassyllus inanus
- Drassyllus lepidus
- Drassyllus mormon
- Drassyllus mumai
- Drassyllus notonus
- Drassyllus orgilus
- Drassyllus prosaphes
- Drassyllus rufulus
- Drassyllus sinton
- Drassyllus texamans
- Eilica bicolor
- Gertschosa amphiloga
- Gnaphosa altudona
- Gnaphosa clara
- Gnaphosa fontinalis
- Gnaphosa sericata
- Haplodrassus chamberlini
- Haplodrassus dixiensis
- Haplodrassus signifer
- Herpyllus bubulcus
- Herpyllus cockerelli
- Herpyllus ecclesiasticus
- Herpyllus gertschi
- Herpyllus hesperolus
- Herpyllus propinquus
- Herpyllus regnans
- Litopyllus temporarius
- Micaria deserticola
- Micaria emertoni
- Micaria gertschi
- Micaria imperiosa
- Micaria langtry
- Micaria longipes
- Micaria mormon
- Micaria nanella
- Micaria nye
- Micaria palliditarsa
- Micaria pasadena
- Micaria pulicaria
- Micaria punctata
- Micaria seminola
- Micaria triangulosa
- Micaria vinnula
- Nodocion eclecticus
- Nodocion floridanus
- Nodocion rufithoracicus
- Scopoides cambridgei
- Scotophaeus blackwalli
- Sergiolus angustus
- Sergiolus bicolor
- Sergiolus capulatus
- Sergiolus cyaneiventris
- Sergiolus lowelli
- Sergiolus minutus
- Sergiolus montanus
- Sergiolus ocellatus
- Sergiolus stella
- Sergiolus tennesseensis
- Sosticus insularis
- Synaphosus paludis
- Synaphosus syntheticus
- Talanites captiosus
- Talanites exlineae
- Trachyzelotes lyonneti
- Urozelotes rusticus
- Zelotes aiken
- Zelotes anglo
- Zelotes duplex
- Zelotes gertschi
- Zelotes hentzi
- Zelotes laetus
- Zelotes lasalanus
- Zelotes lymnophilus
- Zelotes monodens
- Zelotes pseustes
- Zelotes tuobus

== Hahniidae ==
- Cicurina aenigma
- Cicurina arcuata
- Cicurina armadillo
- Cicurina bandera
- Cicurina bandida
- Cicurina baronia
- Cicurina barri
- Cicurina blanco
- Cicurina browni
- Cicurina brunsi
- Cicurina bullis
- Cicurina buwata
- Cicurina caliga
- Cicurina caverna
- Cicurina coryelli
- Cicurina cueva
- Cicurina davisi
- Cicurina delrio
- Cicurina dorothea
- Cicurina ezelli
- Cicurina gruta
- Cicurina hexops
- Cicurina holsingeri
- Cicurina hoodensis
- Cicurina joya
- Cicurina loftini
- Cicurina machete
- Cicurina madla, syn. Cicurina venii
- Cicurina marmorea
- Cicurina mckenziei
- Cicurina medina
- Cicurina menardia
- Cicurina microps
- Cicurina minorata
- Cicurina mirifica
- Cicurina mixmaster
- Cicurina modesta
- Cicurina neovespera
- Cicurina obscura
- Cicurina orellia
- Cicurina pablo
- Cicurina pampa
- Cicurina pastura
- Cicurina patei
- Cicurina platypus
- Cicurina porteri
- Cicurina puentecilla
- Cicurina rainesi
- Cicurina reclusa
- Cicurina reddelli
- Cicurina reyesi
- Cicurina riogrande
- Cicurina robusta
- Cicurina rosae
- Cicurina rudimentops
- Cicurina russelli
- Cicurina sansaba
- Cicurina selecta
- Cicurina serena
- Cicurina sheari
- Cicurina sintonia
- Cicurina sprousei
- Cicurina stowersi
- Cicurina suttoni
- Cicurina texana
- Cicurina travisae
- Cicurina troglobia
- Cicurina ubicki
- Cicurina uvalde
- Cicurina varians
- Cicurina venefica
- Cicurina vespera
- Cicurina vibora
- Cicurina wartoni
- Cicurina watersi
- Hahnia arizonica
- Hahnia cinerea
- Hahnia flaviceps
- Neoantistea agilis
- Neoantistea mulaiki
- Neoantistea oklahomensis
- Neoantistea riparia

== Hersiliidae ==
- Neotama mexicana

== Leptonetidae ==
- Chisoneta chisosea
- Tayshaneta anopica
- Tayshaneta bullis
- Tayshaneta coeca
- Tayshaneta concinna
- Tayshaneta devia
- Tayshaneta microps
- Tayshaneta myopica
- Tayshaneta paraconcinna
- Tayshaneta valverdae

== Linyphiidae ==
- Centromerus latidens
- Ceraticelus emertoni
- Ceraticelus paludigenus
- Ceraticelus paschalis
- Ceraticelus similis
- Ceratinops crenatus
- Ceratinops rugosus
- Ceratinopsis laticeps
- Eperigone albula
- Eperigone antrea
- Eperigone bryantae
- Eperigone eschatologica
- Eperigone maculata
- Eperigone paula
- Eperigone tridentata
- Erigone autumnalis
- Erigone barrowsi
- Erigone dentigera
- Erigone personata
- Eulaira suspecta
- Floricomus mulaiki
- Floricomus ornatulus
- Floricomus rostratus
- Florinda coccinea
- Frontinella communis
- Grammonota inornata
- Grammonota maculata
- Grammonota nigrifrons
- Grammonota suspiciosa
- Grammonota texana
- Grammonota vittata
- Idionella anomala
- Idionella deserta
- Idionella formosa
- Idionella sclerata
- Islandiana flaveola
- Islandiana unicornis
- Jalapyphantes puebla
- Masoncus conspectus
- Meioneta fabra
- Meioneta llanoensis
- Meioneta micaria
- Neriene radiata
- Scylaceus sp.
- Soulgas corticarius
- Styloctetor purpurescens
- Tapinocyba hortensis
- Tennesseellum formica
- Tenuiphantes sabulosus
- Tenuiphantes zebra
- Tutaibo anglicanus
- Walckenaeria puella
- Walckenaeria spiralis

== Liocranidae ==
- Neoanagraphis chamberlini

== Lycosidae ==
- Allocosa absoluta
- Allocosa apora
- Allocosa funerea
- Allocosa furtiva
- Allocosa georgicola
- Allocosa mulaiki
- Allocosa noctuabunda
- Allocosa pylora
- Allocosa retenta
- Alopecosa kochi
- Arctosa littoralis
- Arctosa minuta
- Camptocosa parallela
- Camptocosa texana
- Geolycosa fatifera
- Geolycosa latifrons
- Geolycosa missouriensis
- Geolycosa riograndae
- Geolycosa sepulchralis
- Gladicosa euepigynata
- Gladicosa gulosa
- Gladicosa huberti
- Gladicosa pulchra
- Hesperocosa unica
- Hogna annexa
- Hogna antelucana
- Hogna aspersa
- Hogna baltimoriana
- Hogna carolinensis
- Hogna coloradensis
- Hogna helluo
- Hogna lenta
- Hogna tigana
- Hogna watsoni
- Pardosa atlantica
- Pardosa delicatula
- Pardosa distincta
- Pardosa falcifera
- Pardosa littoralis
- Pardosa mercurialis
- Pardosa milvina
- Pardosa pauxilla
- Pardosa saxatilis
- Pardosa sierra
- Pardosa sternalis
- Pardosa vadosa
- Pardosa zionis
- Pirata alachuus
- Pirata apalacheus
- Pirata davisi
- Pirata felix
- Pirata hiteorum
- Pirata insularis
- Pirata sedentarius
- Pirata seminolus
- Pirata spiniger
- Pirata sylvanus
- Rabidosa hentzi
- Rabidosa punctulata
- Rabidosa rabida
- Schizocosa aulonia
- Schizocosa avida
- Schizocosa bilineata
- Schizocosa crassipes
- Schizocosa mccooki
- Schizocosa ocreata
- Schizocosa perplexa
- Schizocosa retrorsa
- Schizocosa rovneri
- Schizocosa saltatrix
- Schizocosa segregata
- Schizocosa stridulans
- Schizocosa uetzi
- Sosippus texanus
- Trochosa acompa
- Trochosa terricola
- Varacosa avara
- Varacosa gosiuta
- Varacosa parthenus
- Varacosa shenandoa

== Mimetidae ==
- Ero canionis
- Ero pensacolae
- Mimetus haynesi
- Mimetus hesperus
- Mimetus notius
- Mimetus puritanus
- Mimetus syllepsicus

== Miturgidae ==
- Cheiracanthium inclusum
- Strotarchus piscatorius
- Strotarchus planeticus
- Syspira longipes
- Teminius affinis
- Zora pumila

== Mysmenidae ==
- Calodipoena incredula
- Mysmenopsis furtiva

== Nephilidae ==
- Nephila clavipes

== Nesticidae ==
- Eidmannella bullata
- Eidmannella delicata
- Eidmannella nasuta
- Eidmannella pallida
- Eidmannella reclusa
- Eidmannella rostrata
- Eidmannella tuckeri
- Gaucelmus augustinus

== Oecobiidae ==
- Oecobius cellariorum
- Oecobius navus
- Oecobius putus

== Oonopidae ==
- Oonops furtivus
- Oonops secretus
- Oonops stylifer
- Opopaea devia
- Opopaea meditata
- Opopaea sedata
- Orchestina saltitans
- Scaphiella hespera
- Scaphiella juvenilis

== Oxyopidae ==
- Hamataliwa grisea
- Hamataliwa helia
- Hamataliwa unca
- Oxyopes acleistus
- Oxyopes aglossus
- Oxyopes apollo
- Oxyopes lynx
- Oxyopes salticus
- Oxyopes scalaris
- Oxyopes tridens
- Peucetia longipalpis
- Peucetia viridans

== Philodromidae ==
- Apollophanes punctipes
- Apollophanes texanus
- Ebo albocaudatus
- Ebo evansae
- Ebo latithorax
- Ebo merkeli
- Ebo mexicanus
- Ebo pepinensis
- Ebo punctatus
- Ebo redneri
- Ebo texanus
- Philodromus alascensis
- Philodromus cespitum
- Philodromus histrio
- Philodromus imbecillus
- Philodromus infuscatus
- Philodromus keyserlingi
- Philodromus laticeps
- Philodromus marginellus
- Philodromus marxi
- Philodromus minutus
- Philodromus montanus
- Philodromus placidus
- Philodromus praelustris
- Philodromus pratariae
- Philodromus rufus
- Philodromus undarum
- Philodromus vulgaris
- Thanatus formicinus
- Thanatus rubicellus
- Thanatus vulgaris
- Tibellus duttoni
- Tibellus oblongus

== Pholcidae ==
- Chisosa diluta
- Crossopriza lyoni
- Micropholcus fauroti
- Modisimus texanus
- Pholcophora texana
- Pholcus phalangioides
- Physocyclus enaulus
- Physocyclus hoogstraali
- Psilochorus coahuilanus
- Psilochorus imitatus
- Psilochorus pallidulus
- Psilochorus redemptus
- Psilochorus utahensis
- Smeringopus pallidus
- Spermophora senoculata

== Pisauridae ==
- Dolomedes albineus
- Dolomedes scriptus
- Dolomedes tenebrosus
- Dolomedes triton
- Dolomedes vittatus
- Pisaurina dubia
- Pisaurina mira
- Tinus peregrinus

== Plectreuridae ==
- Plectreurys sp.

== Prodidomidae ==
- Prodidomus rufus

== Salticidae ==
- Admestina archboldi
- Admestina tibialis
- Sassacus cyaneus
- Anasaitis canosa
- Attidops cutleri
- Attidops youngi
- Bagheera prosper
- Bellota micans
- Bellota wheeleri
- Bredana alternata
- Bredana complicata
- Chalcoscirtus diminutus
- Cheliferoides longimanus
- Cheliferoides segmentatus
- Eris flava
- Eris floridana
- Eris militaris
- Eris rufa
- Ghelna barrowsi
- Ghelna castanea
- Ghelna sexmaculata
- Habronattus calcaratus
- Habronattus coecatus
- Habronattus cognatus
- Habronattus delectus
- Habronattus dorotheae
- Habronattus fallax
- Habronattus forticulus
- Habronattus hirsutus
- Habronattus klauseri
- Habronattus mataxus
- Habronattus mexicanus
- Habronattus moratus
- Habronattus orbus
- Habronattus sugillatus
- Habronattus texanus
- Habronattus tranquillus
- Habronattus tuberculatus
- Habronattus virgulatus
- Habronattus viridipes
- Hasarius adansoni
- Hentzia mitrata
- Hentzia palmarum
- Lyssomanes viridis
- Maevia inclemens
- Maevia poultoni
- Marpissa bryantae
- Marpissa dentoides
- Marpissa formosa
- Marpissa lineata
- Marpissa obtusa
- Marpissa pikei
- Menemerus bivittatus
- Messua limbata
- Metacyrba punctata
- Metacyrba taeniola
- Metaphidippus chera
- Metaphidippus felix
- Metaphidippus longipalpus
- Metaphidippus texanus
- Mexigonus minutus
- Naphrys acerba
- Naphrys pulex
- Neon nelli
- Neonella vinnula
- Paradamoetas formicinus
- Paramarpissa piratica
- Paraphidippus aurantius
- Paraphidippus fartilis
- Peckhamia americana
- Peckhamia picata
- Peckhamia scorpiona
- Pelegrina arizonensis
- Pelegrina chalceola
- Pelegrina exigua
- Pelegrina galathea
- Pelegrina peckhamorum
- Pelegrina pervaga
- Pelegrina proterva
- Pelegrina sabinema
- Pelegrina tillandsiae
- Pellenes limatus
- Phidippus apacheanus
- Phidippus arizonensis
- Phidippus asotus
- Phidippus audax
- Phidippus bidentatus
- Phidippus californicus
- Phidippus cardinalis
- Phidippus carneus
- Phidippus carolinensis
- Phidippus clarus
- Phidippus comatus
- Phidippus mystaceus
- Phidippus octopunctatus
- Phidippus otiosus
- Phidippus phoenix
- Phidippus pius
- Phidippus princeps
- Phidippus pruinosus
- Phidippus putnami
- Phidippus texanus
- Phidippus tyrannus
- Phidippus vexans
- Phidippus whitmani
- Phlegra hentzi
- Platycryptus undatus
- Plexippus paykulli
- Poultonella alboimmaculata
- Poultonella nuecesensis
- Rhetenor texanus
- Salticus austinensis
- Salticus peckhamae
- Salticus scenicus
- Sarinda hentzi
- Sassacus papenhoei
- Sassacus vitis
- Sitticus concolor
- Sitticus dorsatus
- Sitticus welchi
- Synageles bishopi
- Synageles noxiosus
- Synemosyna formica
- Talavera minuta
- Colonus puerperus
- Colonus sylvanus
- Zygoballus nervosus
- Zygoballus rufipes
- Zygoballus sexpunctatus

== Scytodidae ==
- Scytodes dorothea
- Scytodes perfecta
- Scytodes thoracica
- Scytodes zapatana

== Segestriidae ==
- Ariadna bicolor

== Selenopidae ==
- Selenops actophilus

== Sicariidae ==
- Loxosceles apachea
- Loxosceles blanda
- Loxosceles devia
- Loxosceles reclusa
- Loxosceles rufescens

== Sparassidae ==
- Heteropoda venatoria
- Olios fasciculatus

== Symphtognathidae ==
- Anapistula secreta

== Tetragnathidae ==
- Azilia affinis
- Glenognatha foxi
- Leucauge venusta
- Metellina mimetoides
- Pachygnatha tristriata
- Tetragnatha caudata
- Tetragnatha elongata
- Tetragnatha guatemalensis
- Tetragnatha laboriosa
- Tetragnatha nitens
- Tetragnatha pallescens
- Tetragnatha straminea
- Tetragnatha vermiformis
- Tetragnatha versicolor
- Tetragnatha viridis

== Theridiidae ==
- Achaearanea canionensis
- Achaearanea florendida
- Achaearanea globosa
- Achaearanea insulsa
- Achaearanea porteri
- Achaearanea schullei
- Achaearanea tepidariorum
- Anelosimus studiosus
- Argyrodes elevatus
- Argyrodes pluto
- Chrosiothes jocosus
- Chrosiothes minusculus
- Chrysso albomaculata
- Coleosoma acutiventer
- Crustulina altera
- Crustulina sticta
- Dipoena abdita
- Dipoena cathedralis
- Dipoena nigra
- Emertonella taczanowskii
- Enoplognatha caricis
- Enoplognatha marmorata
- Episinus cognatus
- Euryopis lineatipes
- Euryopis mulaiki
- Euryopis quinquemaculata
- Euryopis spinigera
- Euryopis texana
- Faiditus americanus
- Faiditus cancellatus
- Faiditus caudatus
- Faiditus davisi
- Faiditus globosus
- Faiditus subdolus
- Keijia alabamensis
- Keijia antoni
- Keijia mneon
- Keijia punctosparsa
- Latrodectus geometricus
- Latrodectus hesperus
- Latrodectus mactans
- Latrodectus variolus
- Neospintharus furcatus
- Neospintharus trigonum
- Nesticodes rufipes
- Phoroncidia americana
- Phycosoma lineatipes
- Rhomphaea fictilium
- Rhomphaea projiciens
- Spintharus flavidus
- Steatoda alamosa
- Steatoda americana
- Steatoda borealis
- Steatoda fulva
- Steatoda mexicana
- Steatoda punctulata
- Steatoda quadrimaculata
- Steatoda transversa
- Steatoda triangulosa
- Steatoda variata
- Steatoda variata
- Stemmops bicolor
- Takayus lyricus
- Theridion australe
- Theridion cameronense
- Theridion cinctipes
- Theridion cynicum
- Theridion differens
- Theridion dilutum
- Theridion dividuum
- Theridion flavonotatum
- Theridion frondeum
- Theridion glaucescens
- Theridion goodnightorum
- Theridion hidalgo
- Theridion llano
- Theridion murarium
- Theridion myersi
- Theridion positivum
- Theridion rabuni
- Theridion submissum
- Theridula opulenta
- Thymoites expulsus
- Thymoites illudens
- Thymoites marxi
- Thymoites missionensis
- Thymoites pallidus
- Thymoites unimaculatus
- Tidarren haemorrhoidale
- Tidarren sisyphoides
- Wamba crispulus

== Thomisidae ==
- Bassaniana floridana
- Bassaniana utahensis
- Bassaniana versicolor
- Majellula sp.
- Misumena vatia
- Misumenoides formosipes
- Misumenops asperatus
- Misumenops californicus
- Misumenops carletonicus
- Misumenops celer
- Misumenops coloradensis
- Misumenops dubius
- Misumenops oblongus
- Modysticus modestus
- Ozyptila americana
- Ozyptila hardyi
- Ozyptila monroensis
- Synema parvulum
- Synema viridans
- Tmarus angulatus
- Tmarus floridensis
- Tmarus rubromaculatus
- Tmarus unicus
- Xysticus apachecus
- Xysticus aprilinus
- Xysticus auctificus
- Xysticus coloradensis
- Xysticus concursus
- Xysticus elegans
- Xysticus ellipticus
- Xysticus emertoni
- Xysticus ferox
- Xysticus fraternus
- Xysticus funestus
- Xysticus furtivus
- Xysticus gulosus
- Xysticus lassanus
- Xysticus locuples
- Xysticus nevadensis
- Xysticus pellax
- Xysticus punctatus
- Xysticus robinsoni
- Xysticus texanus

== Titanoecidae ==
- Titanoeca americana
- Titanoeca nigrella
- Titanoeca nivalis

== Uloboridae ==
- Hyptiotes cavatus
- Hyptiotes puebla
- Miagrammopes mexicanus
- Octonoba sinensis
- Philoponella oweni
- Philoponella semiplumosa
- Uloborus glomosus
- Uloborus segregatus

== Zorocratidae ==
- Zorocrates aemulus
- Zorocrates alternatus
- Zorocrates isolatus
