= Phruronellus =

Genus of spiders

Phruronellus was a genus of North American araneomorph spiders first described by R. V. Chamberlin in 1921. Originally placed with the Liocranidae, it was moved to the Corinnidae in 2002, and to the Phrurolithidae in 2014.

As of 2024, the genus is a junior synonym of Scotinella Banks, 1911.

== Species ==
Species that have been placed in Phruronellus and were accepted in Scotinella as of January 2024 include:

- Phruronellus californicus Chamberlin & Gertsch, 1930 → Scotinella californica (Chamberlin & Gertsch, 1930)
- Phruronellus floridae Chamberlin & Gertsch, 1930 → Scotinella floridae (Chamberlin & Gertsch, 1930)
- Phruronellus formica (Banks, 1895) (type) → Scotinella formica (Banks, 1895)
- Phruronellus formidabilis Chamberlin & Gertsch, 1930 Scotinella formidabilis (Chamberlin & Gertsch, 1930)
- Phruronellus pictus Chamberlin & Gertsch, 1930 Scotinella picta (Chamberlin & Gertsch, 1930)
