= Phidippus tyrannus =

Scientific classification
- Kingdom: Animalia
- Phylum: Arthropoda
- Subphylum: Chelicerata
- Class: Arachnida
- Order: Araneae
- Infraorder: Araneomorphae
- Family: Salticidae
- Genus: Phidippus
- Species: P. tyrannus

Binomial name
- Phidippus tyrannus (Edwards, 2004)

Species of spider

Phidippus tyrannus is a species of jumping spider found in the United States and Mexico, first described in 2004.
