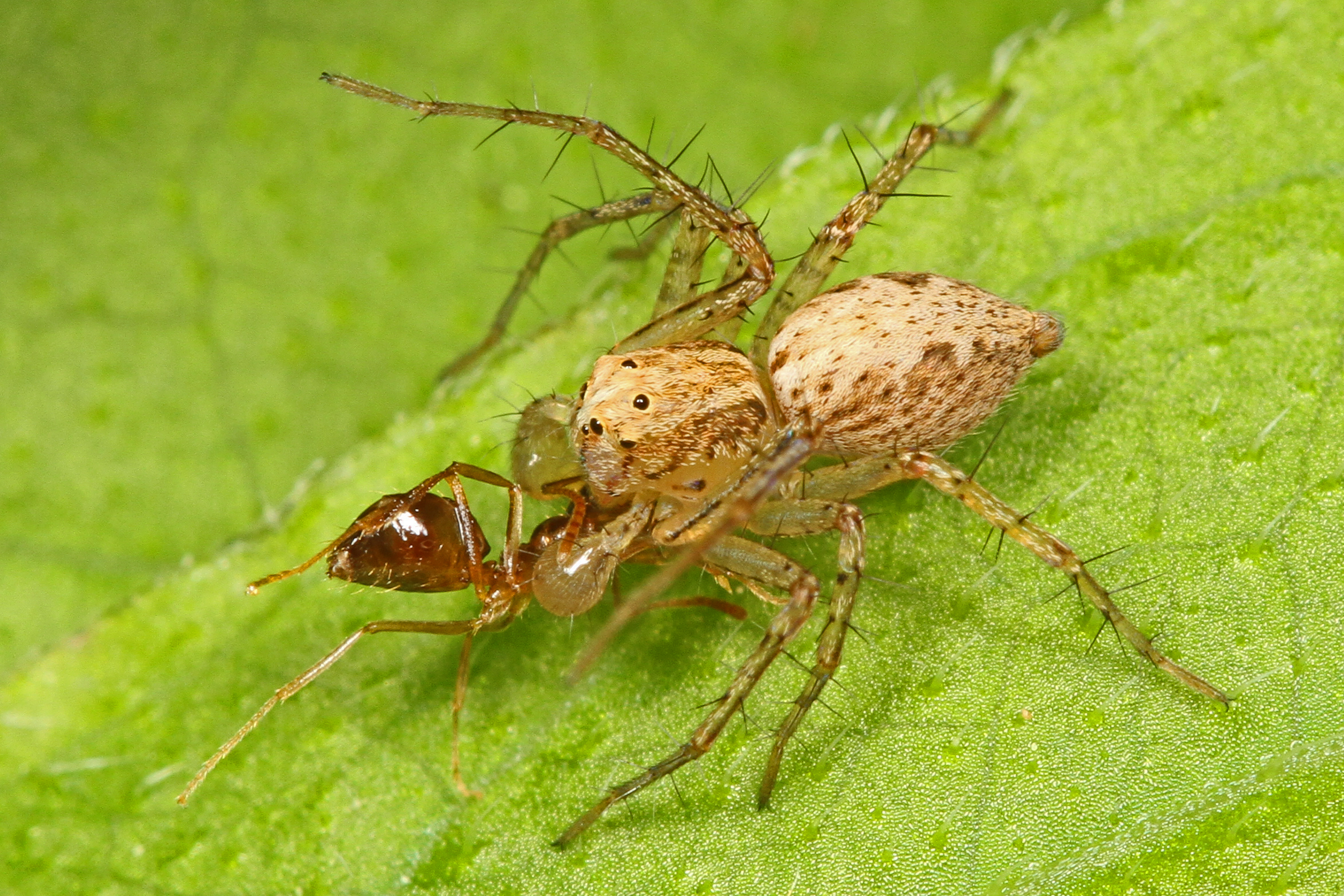

Scientific classification
- Kingdom: Animalia
- Phylum: Arthropoda
- Subphylum: Chelicerata
- Class: Arachnida
- Order: Araneae
- Infraorder: Araneomorphae
- Family: Oxyopidae
- Genus: Oxyopes
- Species: O. aglossus

Binomial name
- Oxyopes aglossus Chamberlin, 1929

= Oxyopes aglossus =

Species of spider

Oxyopes aglossus is a species of lynx spider in the family Oxyopidae. It is found in the United States.

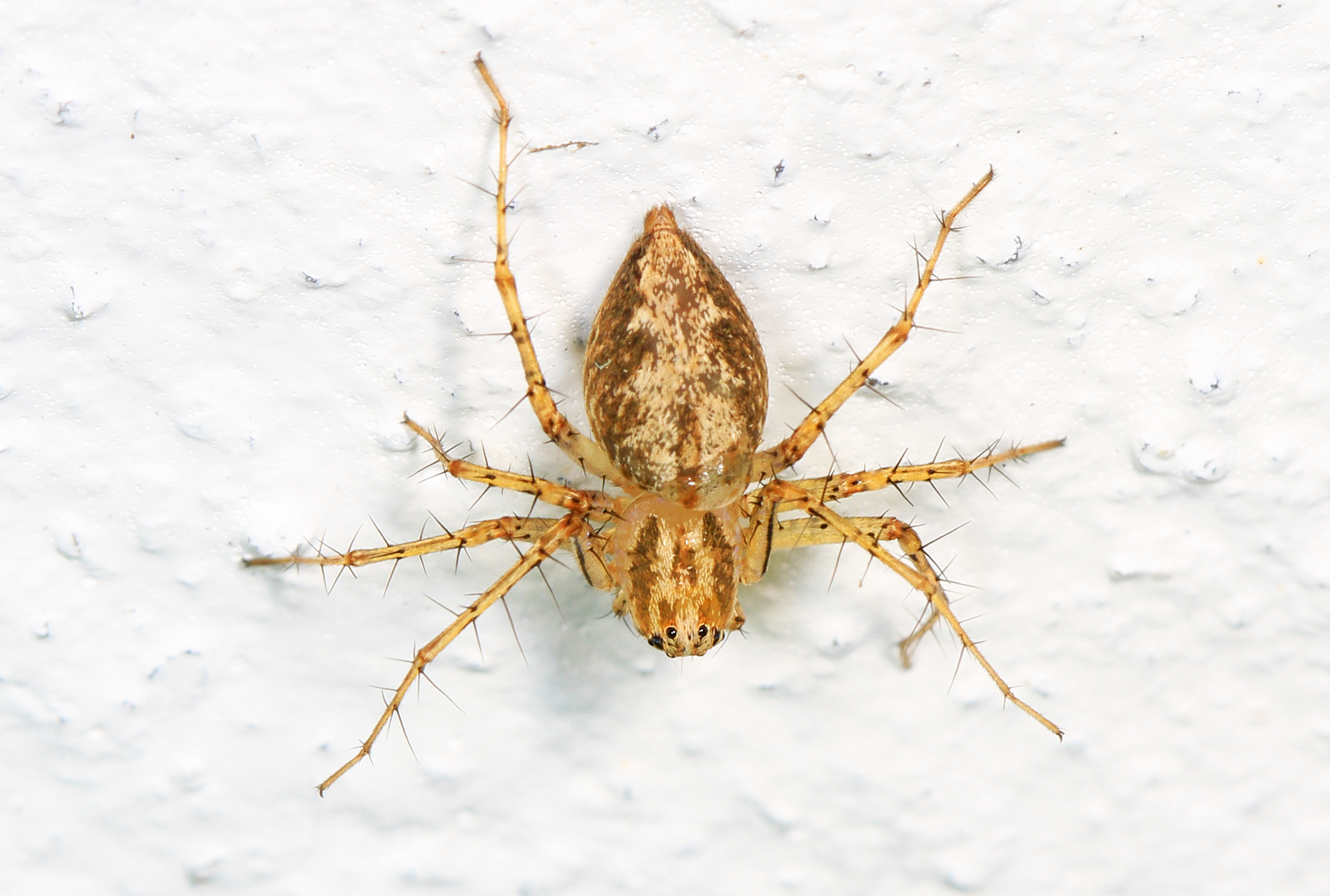

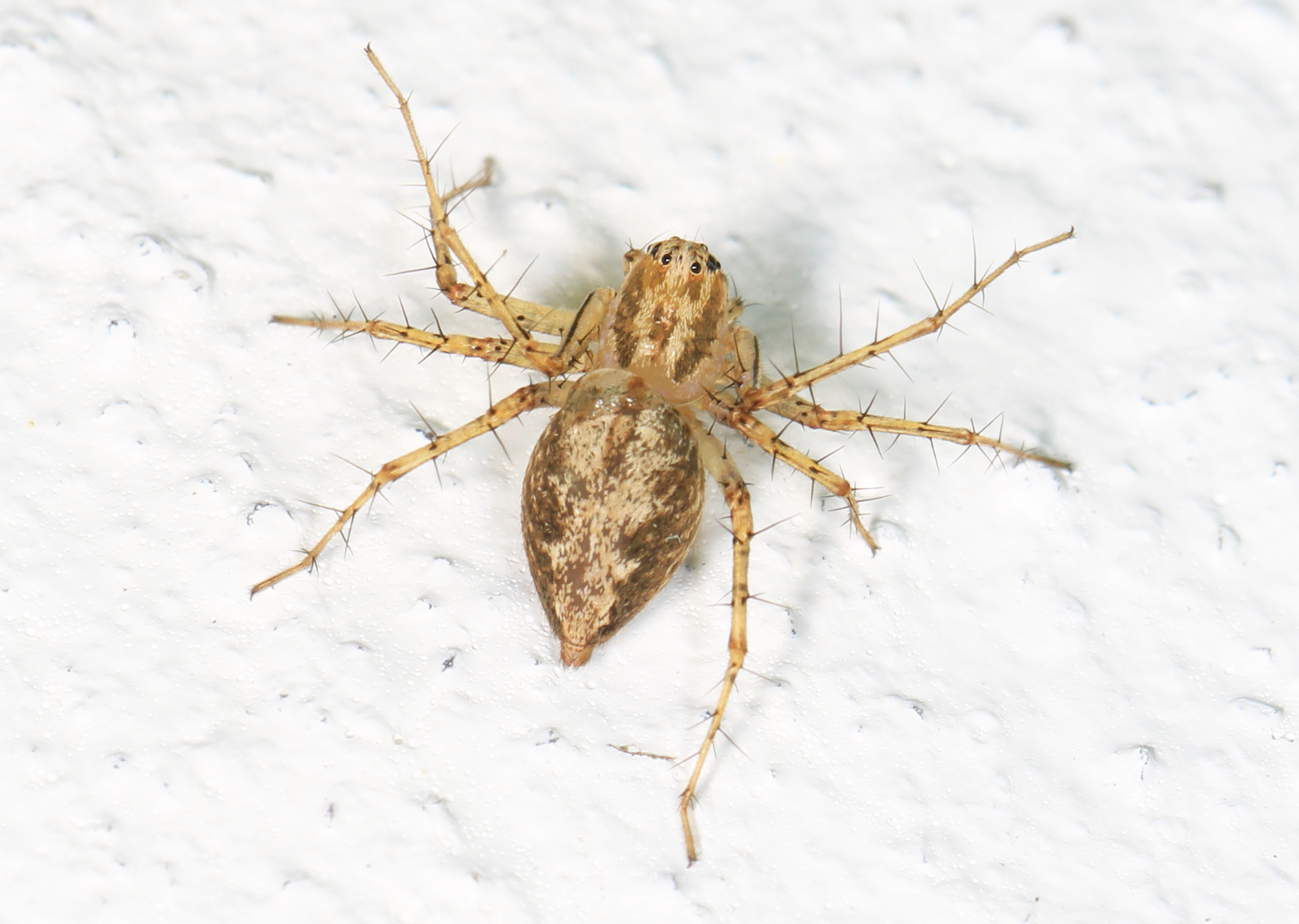
