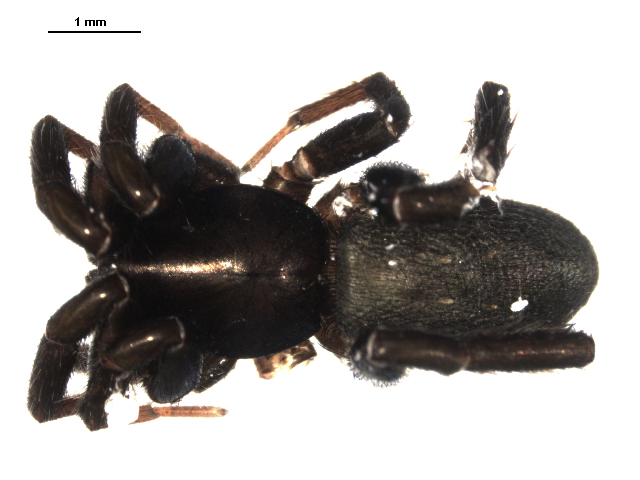

Scientific classification
- Kingdom: Animalia
- Phylum: Arthropoda
- Subphylum: Chelicerata
- Class: Arachnida
- Order: Araneae
- Infraorder: Araneomorphae
- Family: Gnaphosidae
- Genus: Zelotes
- Species: Z. pseustes

Binomial name
- Zelotes pseustes Chamberlin, 1922

= Zelotes pseustes =

Species of spider

Zelotes pseustes is a species of ground spider in the family Gnaphosidae. It is found in the United States and Mexico.
