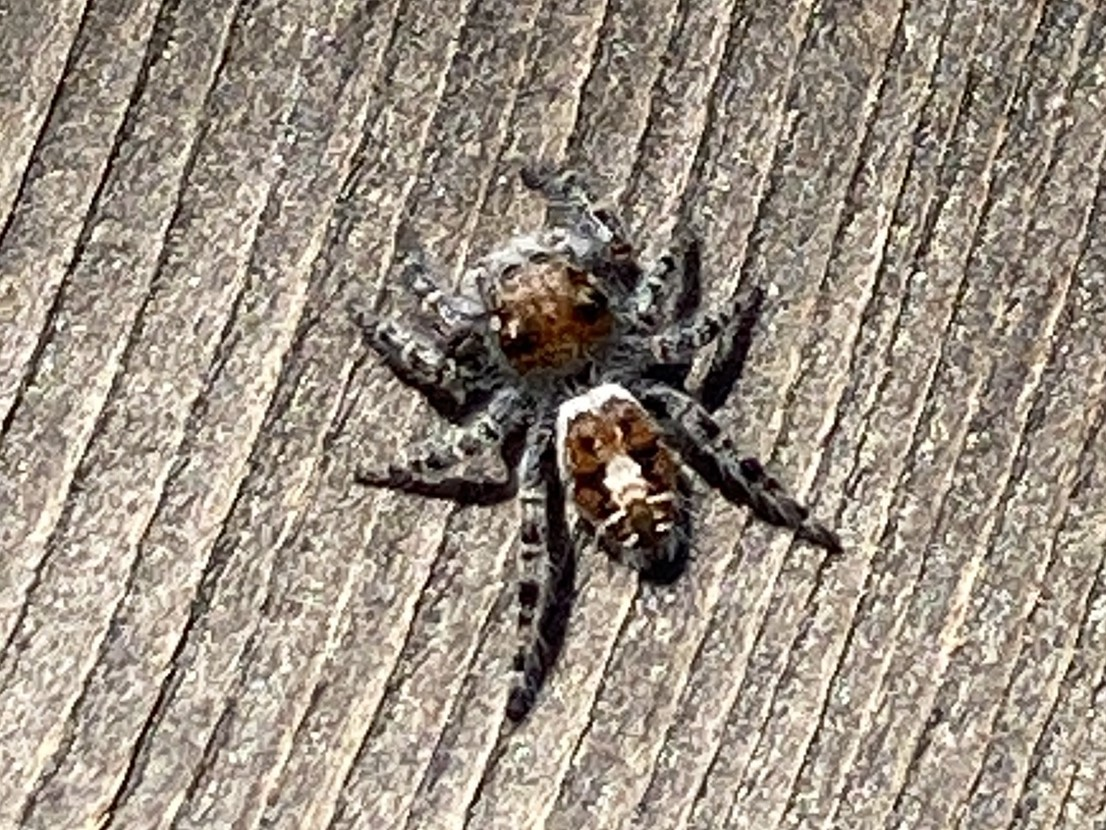

Scientific classification
- Kingdom: Animalia
- Phylum: Arthropoda
- Subphylum: Chelicerata
- Class: Arachnida
- Order: Araneae
- Infraorder: Araneomorphae
- Family: Salticidae
- Genus: Phidippus
- Species: P. comatus

Binomial name
- Phidippus comatus Peckham & Peckham, 1901

Synonyms
- Phidippus comatus Peckham & Peckham, 1901; Phidippus femoratus Peckham & Peckham, 1909; Dendryphantes comatus (Peckham & Peckham, 1901); Dendryphantes femoratus (Peckham & Peckham, 1909); Dendryphantes consimilis Roewer, 1951

= Phidippus comatus =

Species of spider

Phidippus comatus is a species of jumping spider in the family Salticidae. It is found in North America.
