= Zelotes duplex =

Scientific classification
- Kingdom: Animalia
- Phylum: Arthropoda
- Subphylum: Chelicerata
- Class: Arachnida
- Order: Araneae
- Infraorder: Araneomorphae
- Family: Gnaphosidae
- Genus: Zelotes
- Species: Z. duplex

Binomial name
- Zelotes duplex Chamberlin, 1922

Synonyms
- Zelotes sylvanus Chamberlin & Ivie, 1944

Species of spider

Zelotes duplex is a species of ground spider in the family Gnaphosidae. It is found in the United States and Canada.
