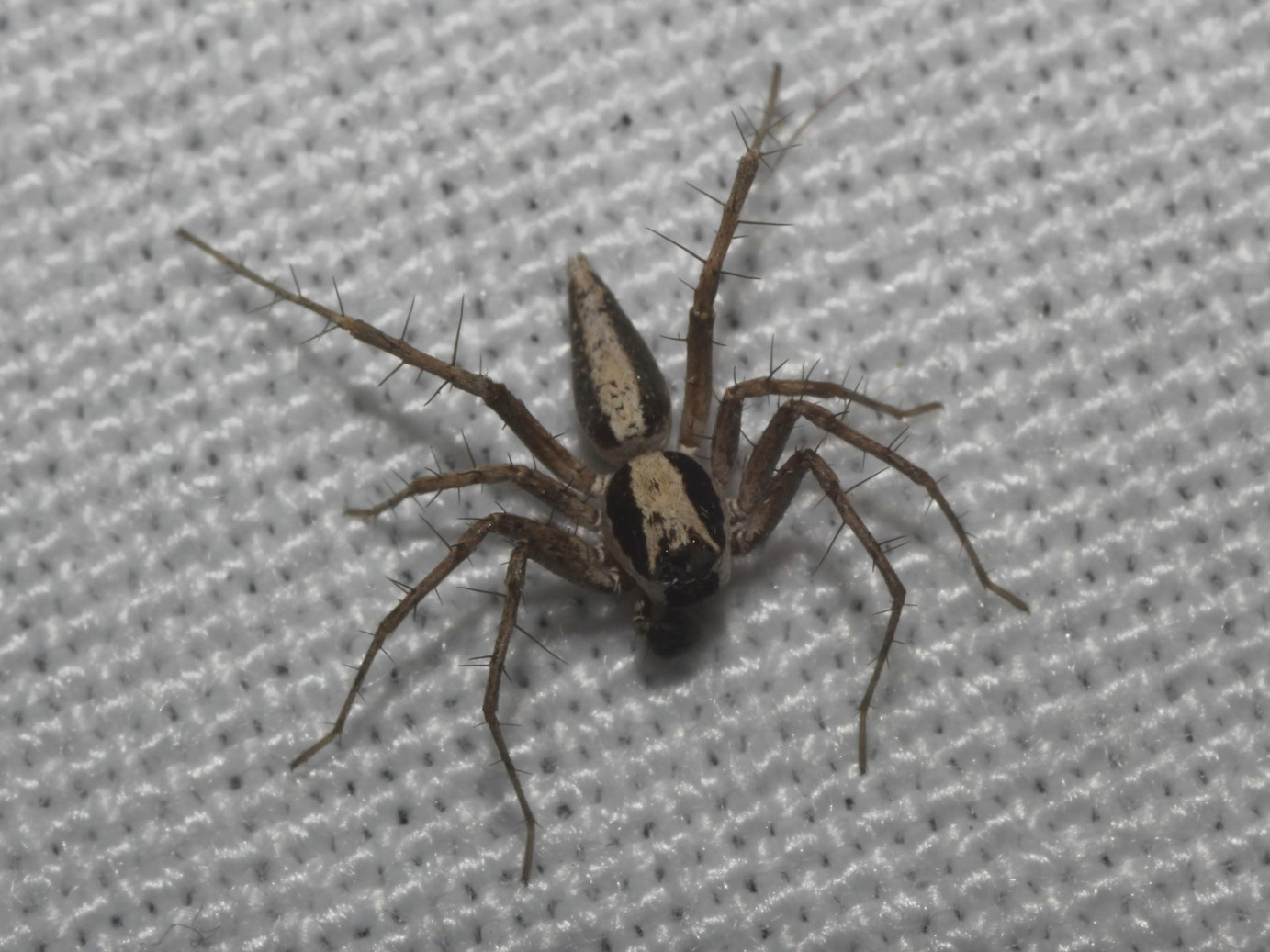

Scientific classification
- Kingdom: Animalia
- Phylum: Arthropoda
- Subphylum: Chelicerata
- Class: Arachnida
- Order: Araneae
- Infraorder: Araneomorphae
- Family: Oxyopidae
- Genus: Oxyopes
- Species: O. tridens

Binomial name
- Oxyopes tridens Brady, 1964

= Oxyopes tridens =

Species of spider

Oxyopes tridens is a species of lynx spider in the family Oxyopidae. It is found in the United States and Mexico.
