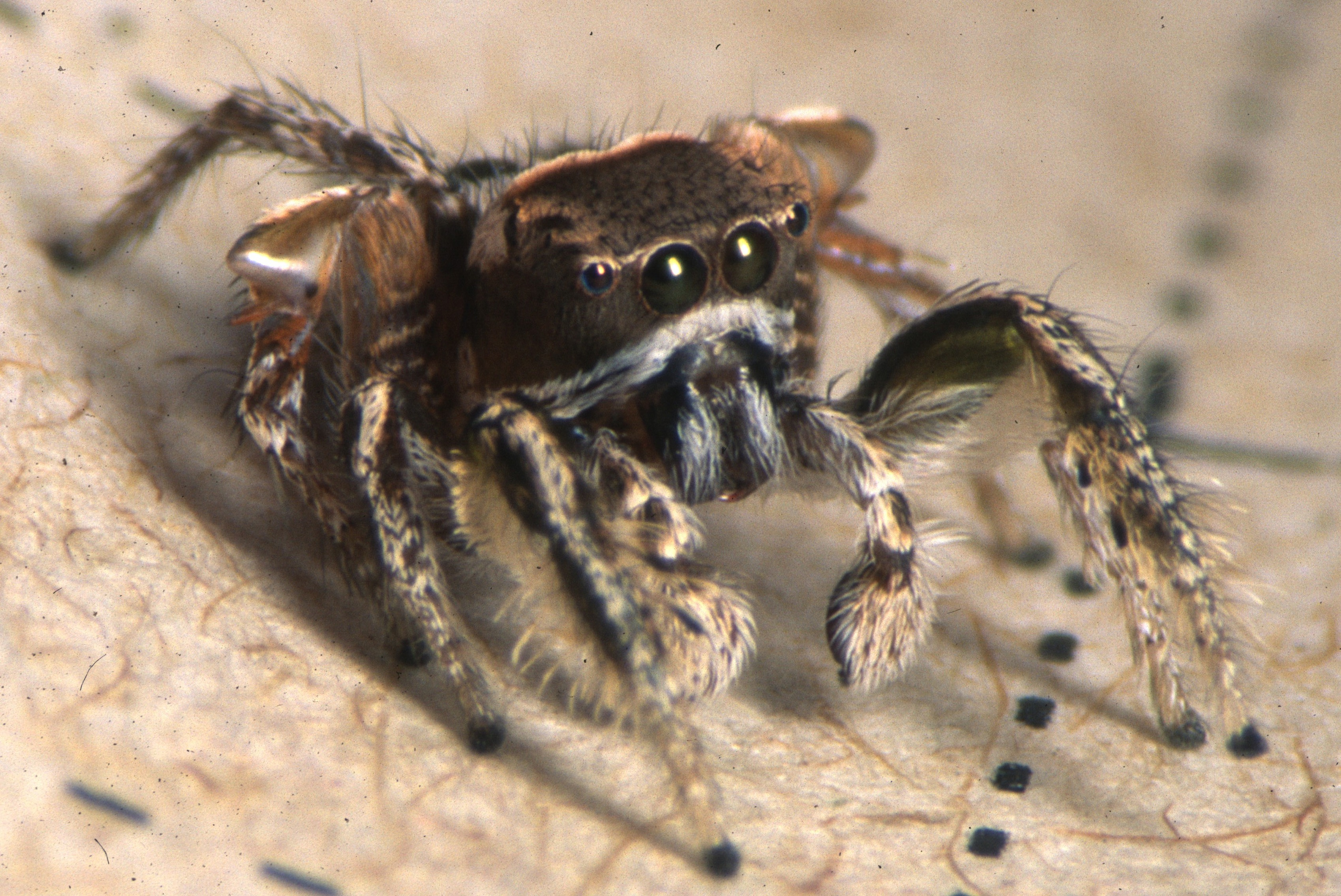
- Male from Kenedy County, Texas

Scientific classification
- Kingdom: Animalia
- Phylum: Arthropoda
- Subphylum: Chelicerata
- Class: Arachnida
- Order: Araneae
- Infraorder: Araneomorphae
- Family: Salticidae
- Genus: Habronattus
- Species: H. viridipes

Binomial name
- Habronattus viridipes (Hentz, 1846)

= Habronattus viridipes =

Species of spider

Habronattus viridipes is a species of jumping spider that can be found in the eastern United States (west to Minnesota and Texas) and southern Canada. The species are brownish-black, and have a size of 5.5 millimetres (0.22 in). Its front legs are green. The males attract females by doing a "dance", and showing them their green front legs. If the female likes the dance, they will start to mate.
