= Zelotes hentzi =

Scientific classification
- Domain: Eukaryota
- Kingdom: Animalia
- Phylum: Arthropoda
- Subphylum: Chelicerata
- Class: Arachnida
- Order: Araneae
- Infraorder: Araneomorphae
- Family: Gnaphosidae
- Genus: Zelotes
- Species: Z. hentzi

Binomial name
- Zelotes hentzi Barrows, 1945

Species of spider

Zelotes hentzi is a species of ground spider in the family Gnaphosidae. It is found in the United States and Canada.
