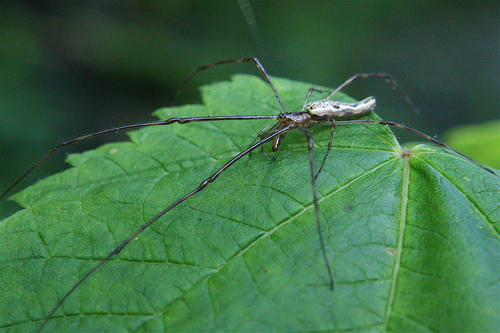

Scientific classification
- Domain: Eukaryota
- Kingdom: Animalia
- Phylum: Arthropoda
- Subphylum: Chelicerata
- Class: Arachnida
- Order: Araneae
- Infraorder: Araneomorphae
- Family: Tetragnathidae
- Genus: Tetragnatha
- Species: T. elongata

Binomial name
- Tetragnatha elongata Walckenaer, 1841

Subspecies
- T. e. debilis; T. e. principalis; T. e. undulata

Synonyms
- Tetragnatha culicivora Walckenaer, 1841; Tetragnatha fimbriata Walckenaer, 1841; Tetragnatha fulva Walckenaer, 1841; Tetragnatha sanctitata Walckenaer, 1841; Tetragnatha violacea Walckenaer, 1841; Tetragnatha armigera Blackwall, 1846; Tetragnatha grallator Hentz, 1850

= Tetragnatha elongata =

Species of spider

Tetragnatha elongata, the elongate stilt spider, is a spider in the family Tetragnathidae.

== Distribution ==
Tetragnatha elongata is commonly found in North and Central America, including Cuba and Jamaica.
