= Hesperocosa =

Scientific classification
- Kingdom: Animalia
- Phylum: Arthropoda
- Subphylum: Chelicerata
- Class: Arachnida
- Order: Araneae
- Infraorder: Araneomorphae
- Family: Lycosidae
- Genus: Hesperocosa
- Species: H. unica

Binomial name
- Hesperocosa unica (Gertsch & Wallace, 1935)

Genus of spiders

Hesperocosa is a genus of spiders in the family Lycosidae. It was first described in 1937 by Gertsch & Wallace. As of 2017, it contains only one species, Hesperocosa unica, found in the United States.
