= Zelotes lasalanus =

Scientific classification
- Kingdom: Animalia
- Phylum: Arthropoda
- Subphylum: Chelicerata
- Class: Arachnida
- Order: Araneae
- Infraorder: Araneomorphae
- Family: Gnaphosidae
- Genus: Zelotes
- Species: Z. lasalanus

Binomial name
- Zelotes lasalanus Chamberlin, 1928

Synonyms
- Zelotes chicano Gertsch & Riechert, 1976

Species of spider

Zelotes lasalanus is a species of ground spider in the family Gnaphosidae. It is found in North America.
