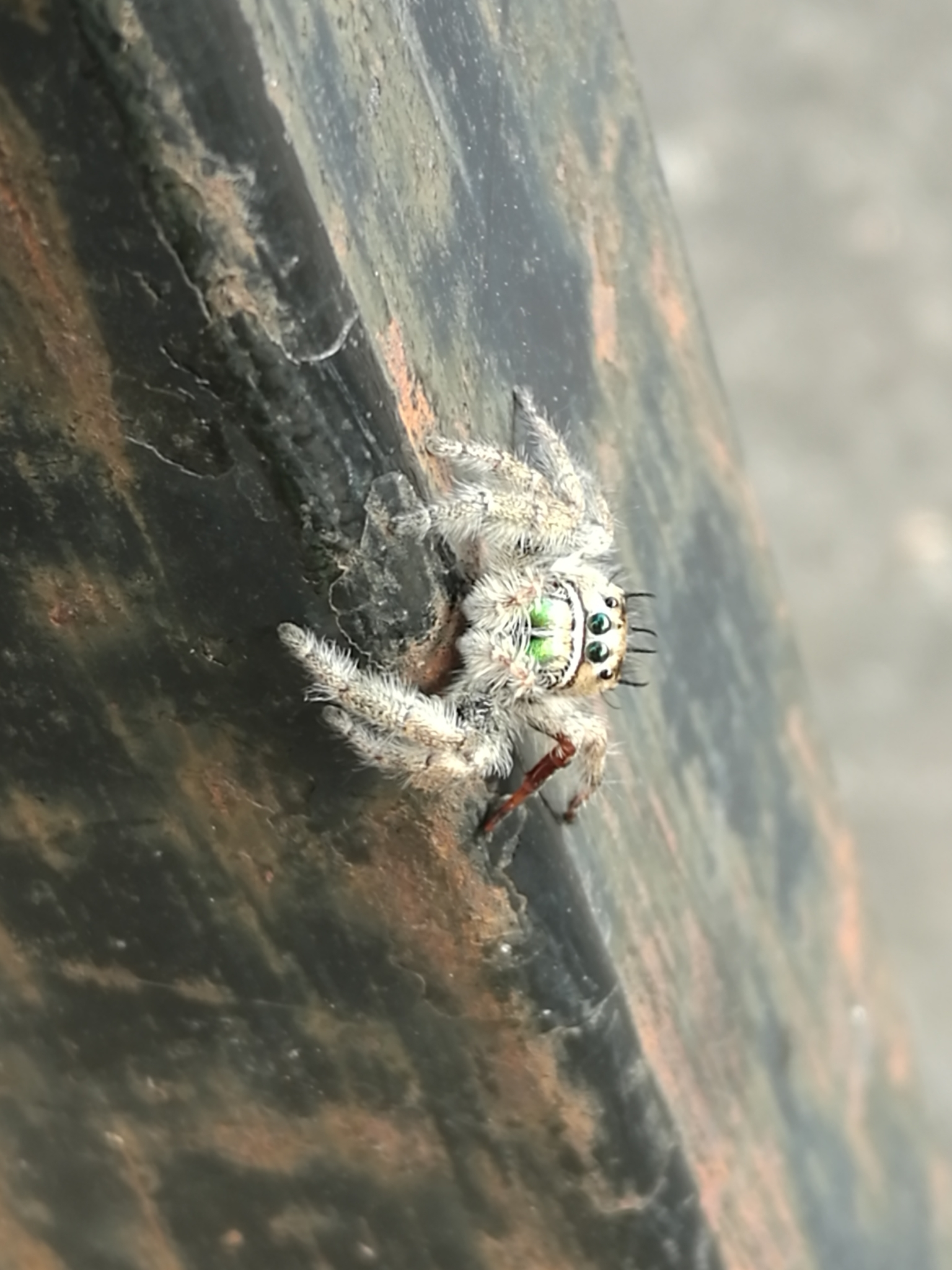
- female

Scientific classification
- Kingdom: Animalia
- Phylum: Arthropoda
- Subphylum: Chelicerata
- Class: Arachnida
- Order: Araneae
- Infraorder: Araneomorphae
- Family: Salticidae
- Genus: Phidippus
- Species: P. bidentatus

Binomial name
- Phidippus bidentatus F. O. P.-Cambridge, 1901

= Phidippus bidentatus =

Species of spider

Phidippus bidentatus is a species of jumping spider. It is found in a range from the United States to Costa Rica.
