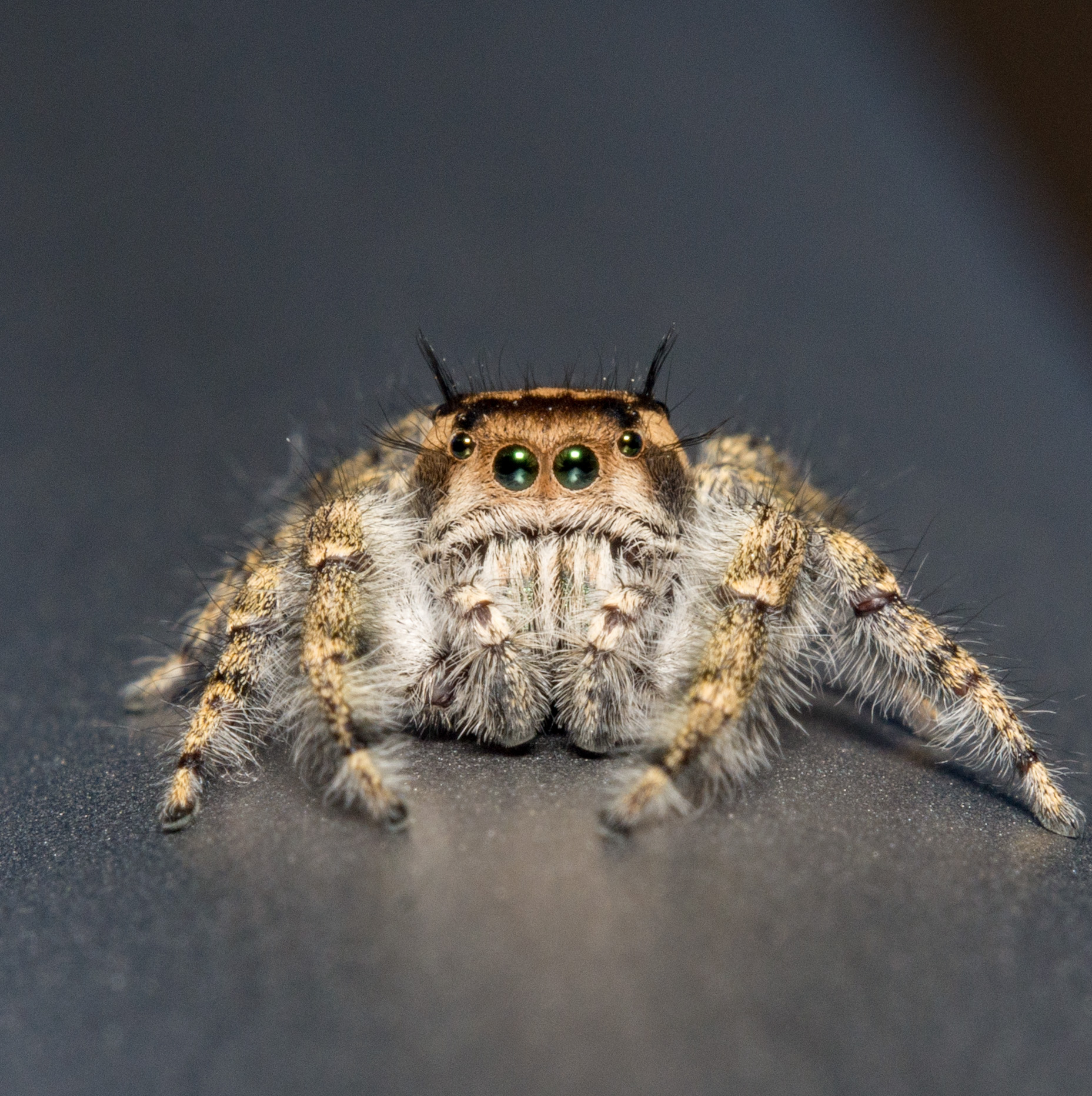
- Phidippus pruinosus (male)
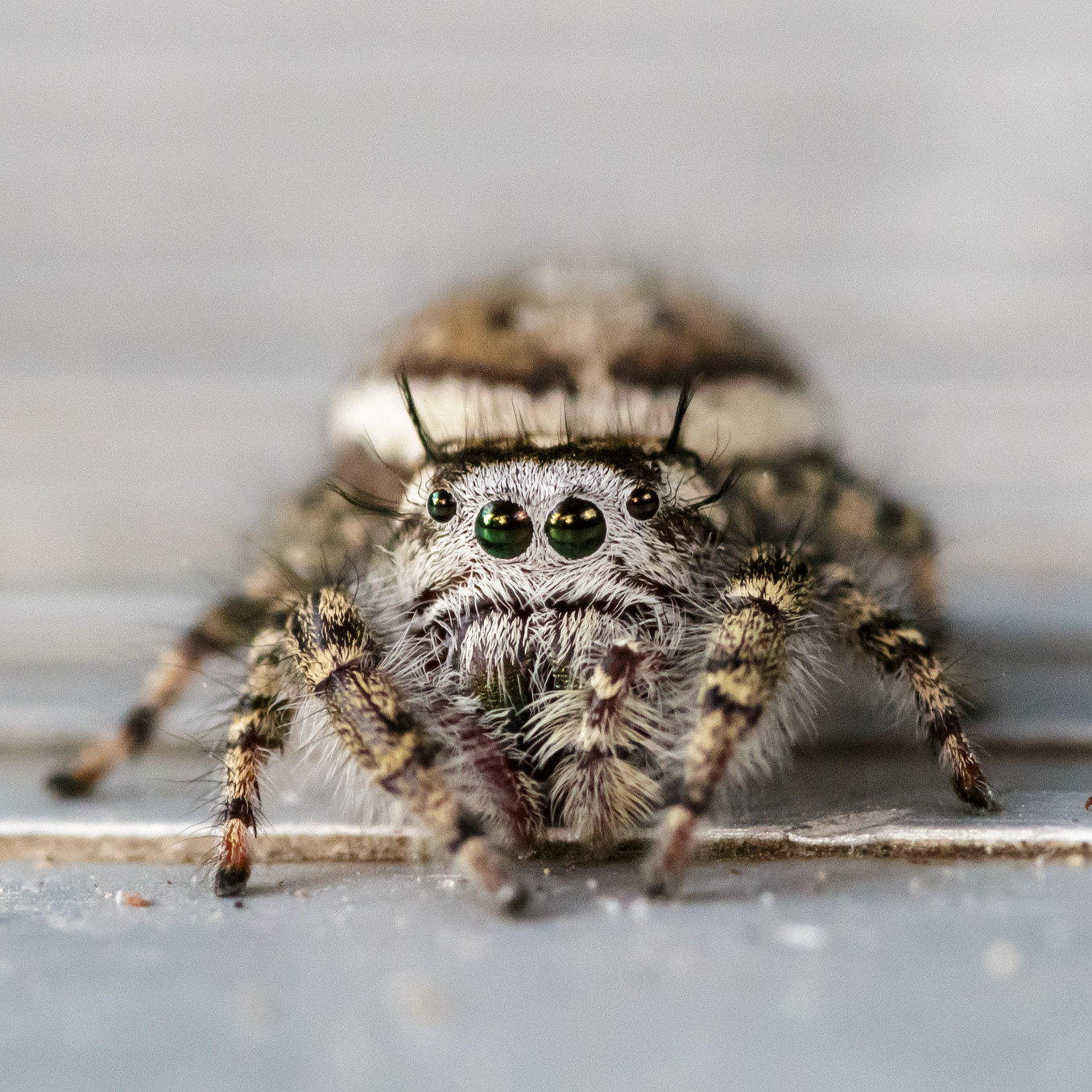
- Phidippus pruinosus (female)

Scientific classification
- Kingdom: Animalia
- Phylum: Arthropoda
- Subphylum: Chelicerata
- Class: Arachnida
- Order: Araneae
- Infraorder: Araneomorphae
- Family: Salticidae
- Genus: Phidippus
- Species: P. pruinosus

Binomial name
- Phidippus pruinosus Peckham & Peckham, 1909

= Phidippus pruinosus =

Species of spider

Phidippus pruinosus is a species of jumping spider in the family Salticidae. It was described by arachnologists George and Elizabeth Peckham in 1909. It is found only in the state of Texas in the United States.

== Range ==
This species is primarily found in Central Texas, with a few historical records near Abilene.

== Habitat ==
Phidippus pruinosus is generally found in xeric habitats and is associated with juniper

== Gallery ==
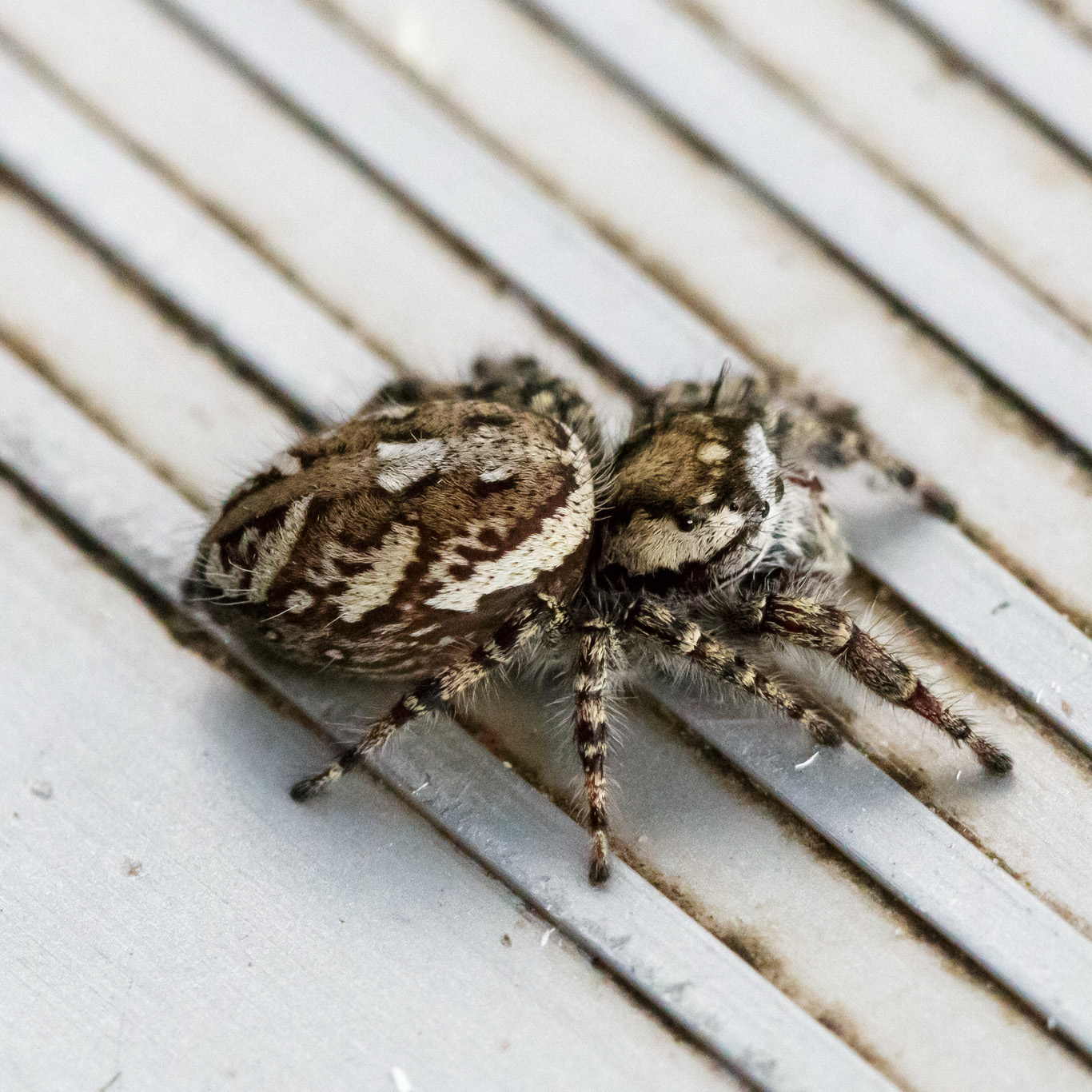
Adult Female - Dorsal View

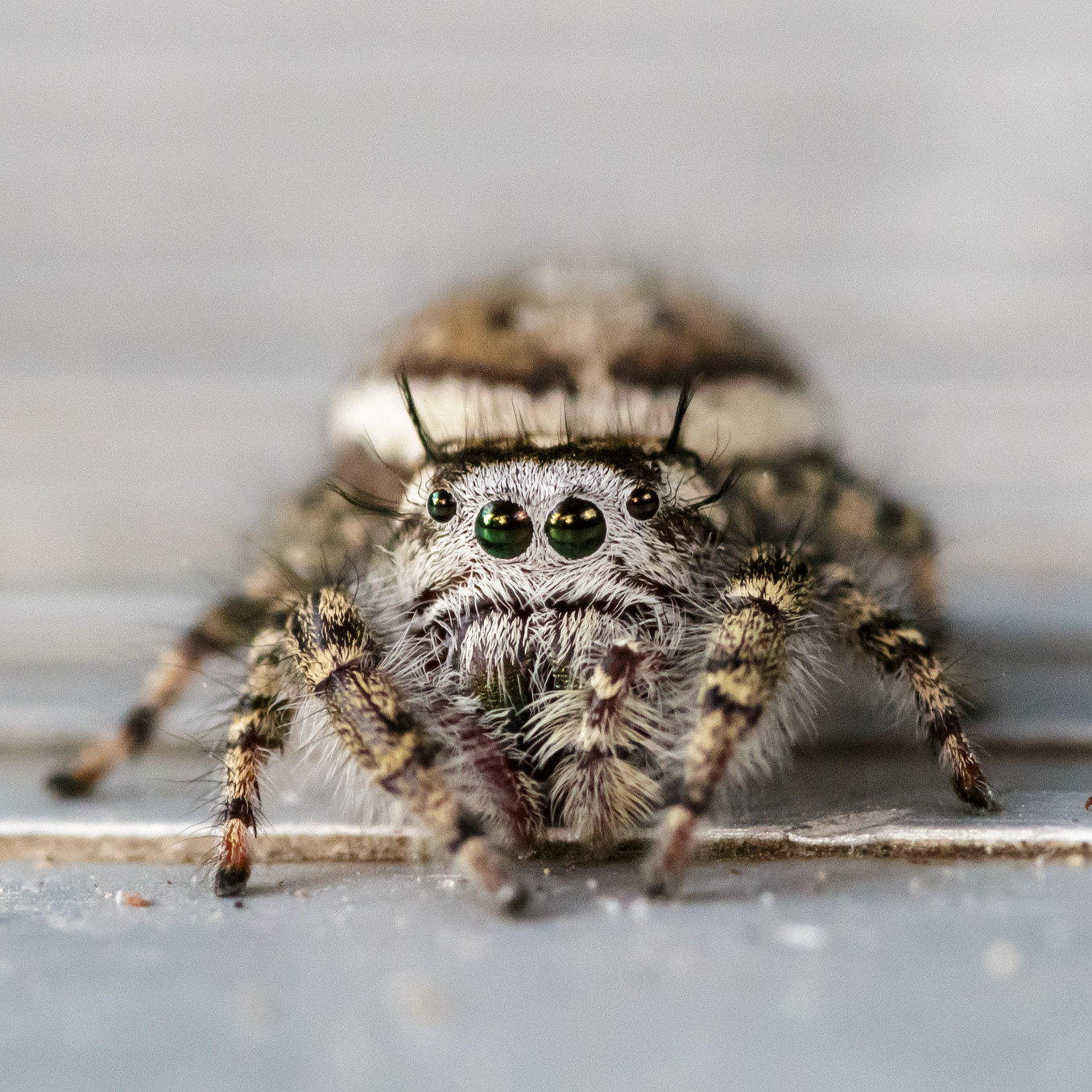
Adult Female - Face

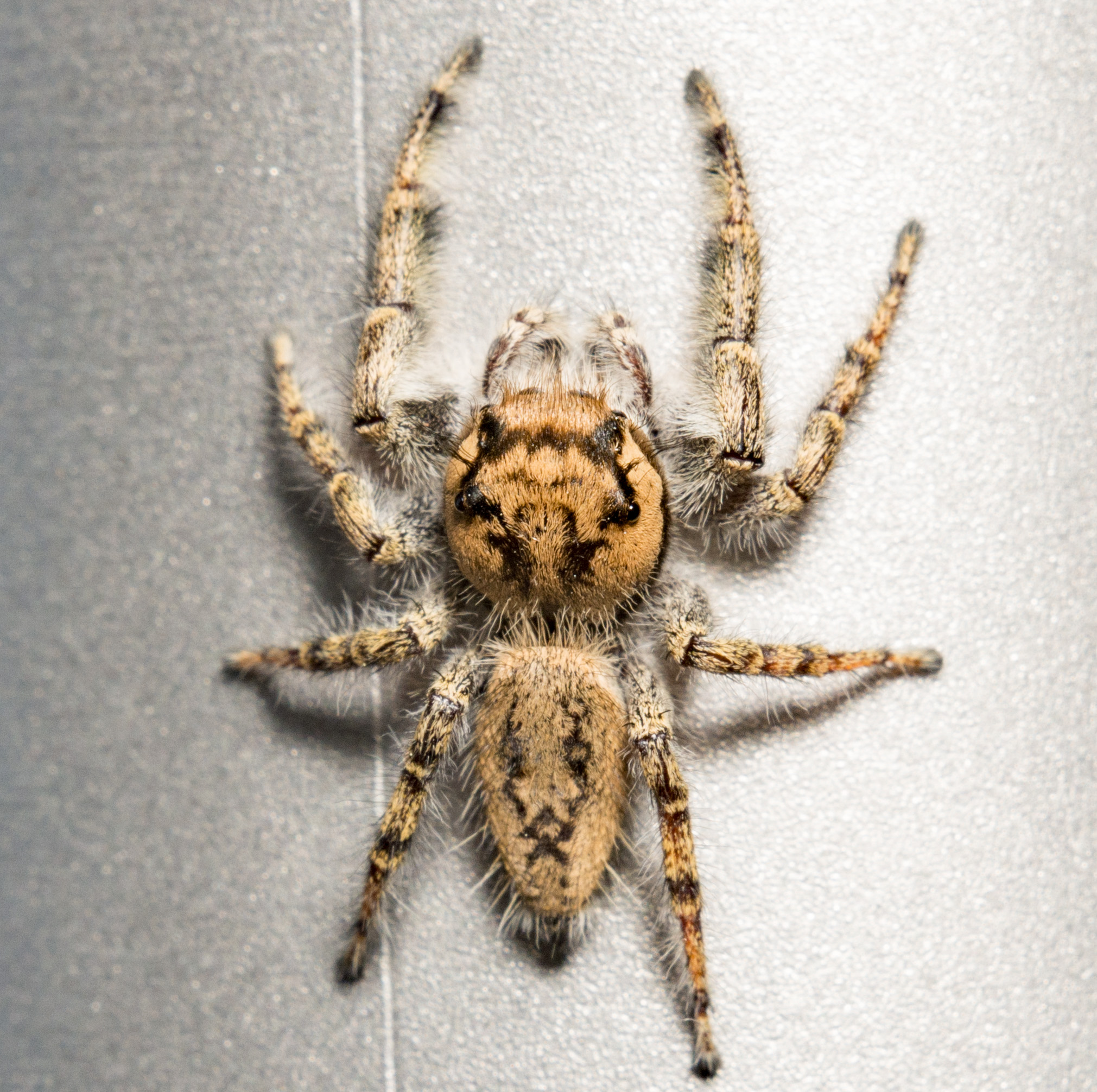
Adult Male - Dorsal View

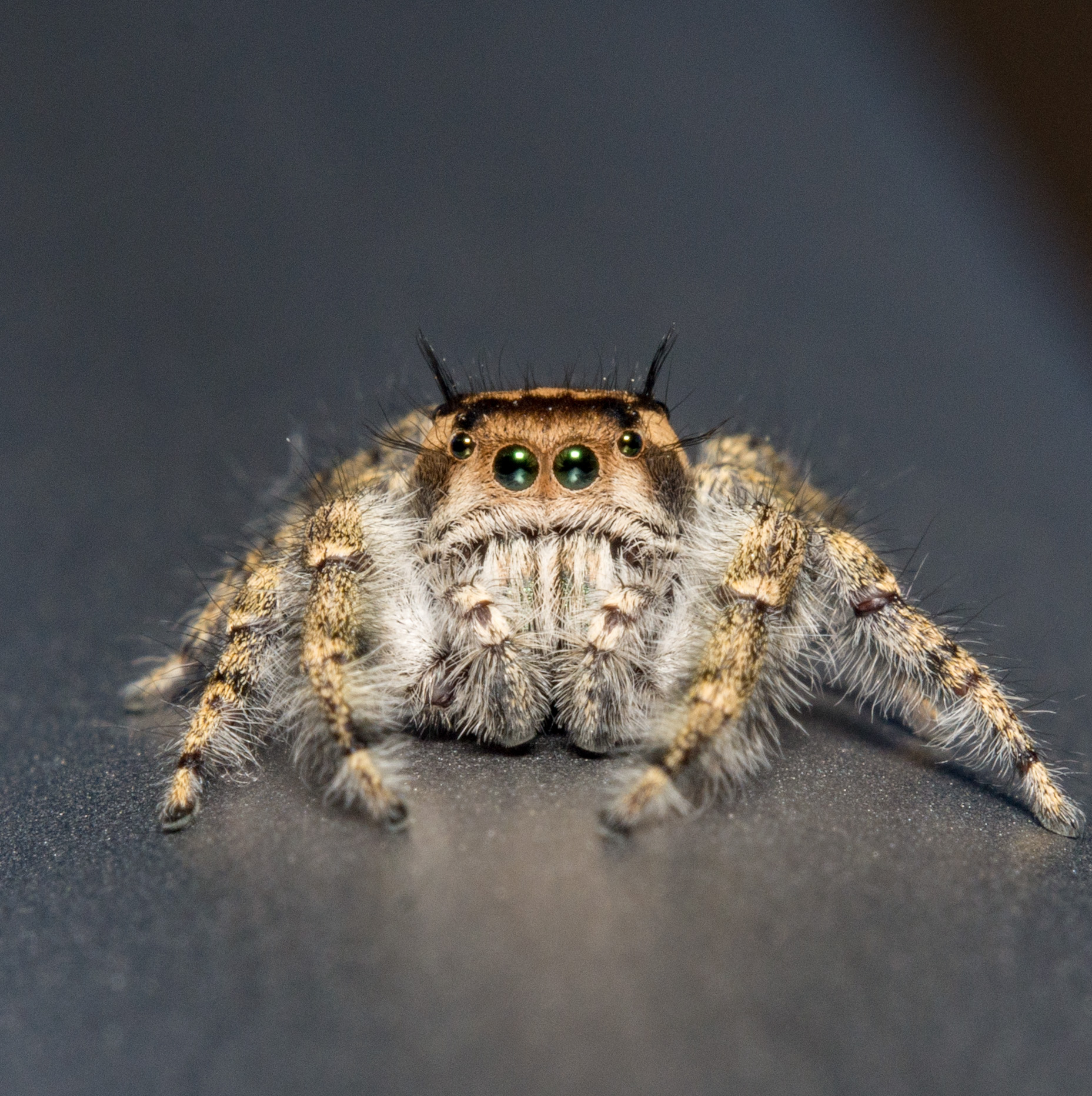
Adult Male - Face

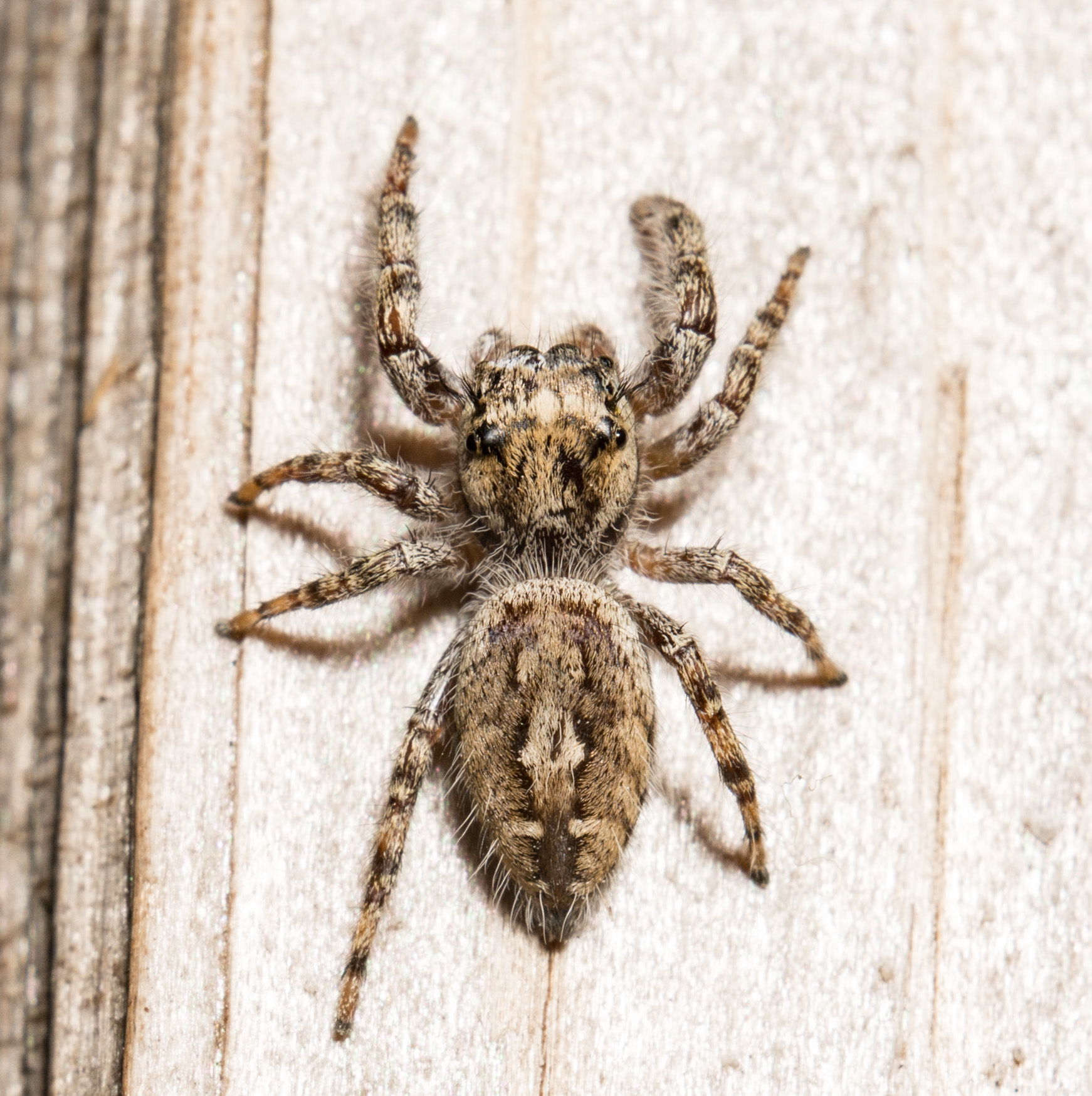
Subadult Male - Dorsal View

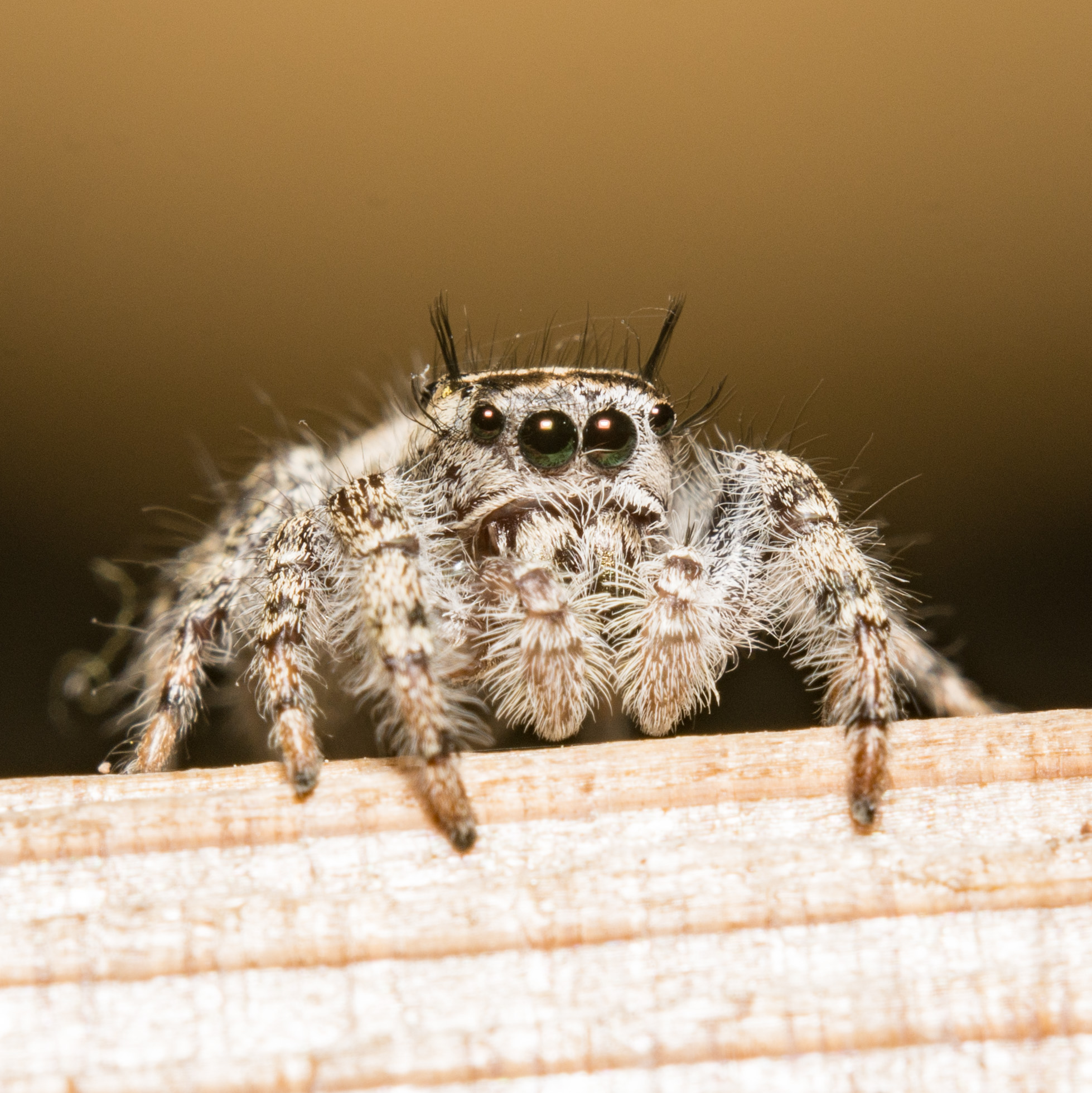
Subadult Male - Face
