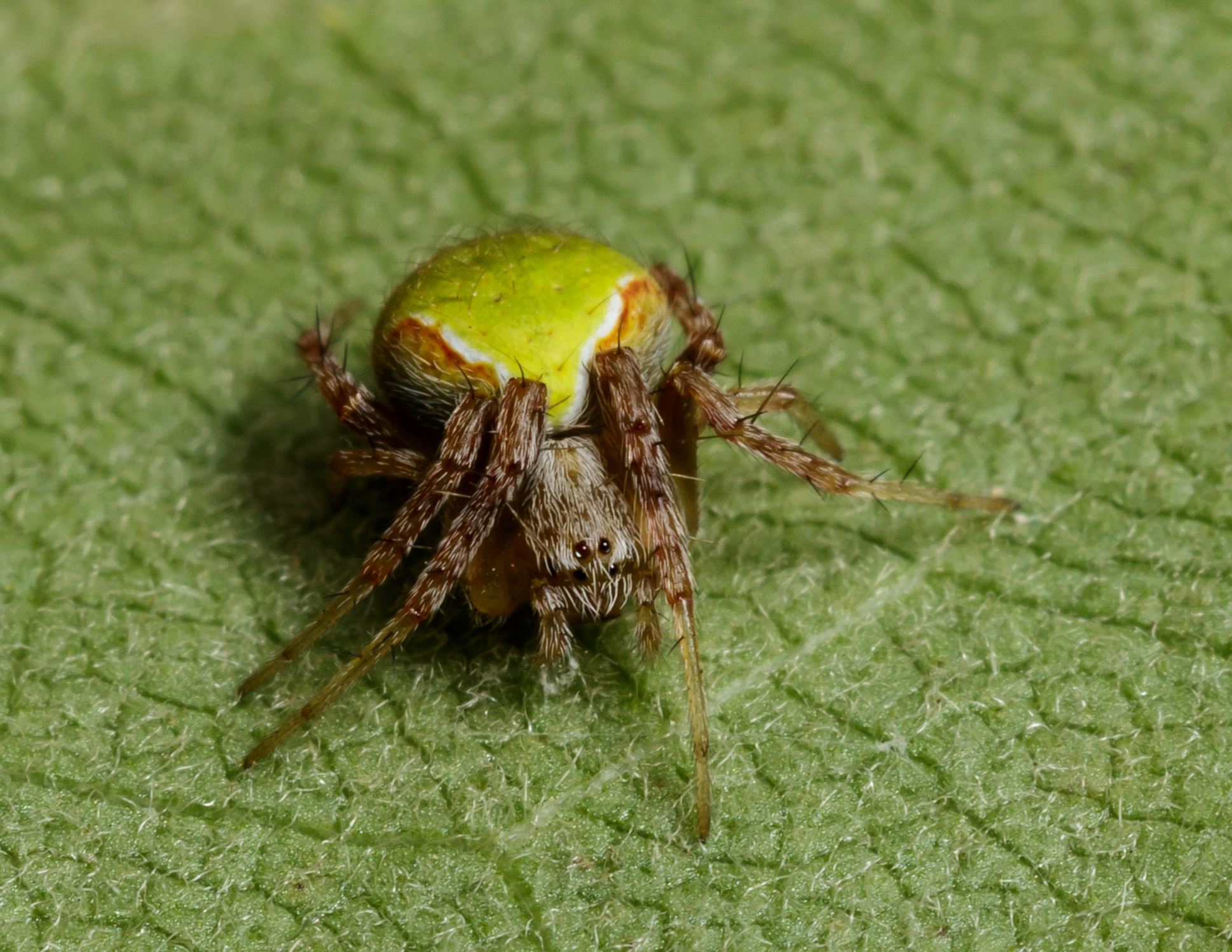

Scientific classification
- Domain: Eukaryota
- Kingdom: Animalia
- Phylum: Arthropoda
- Subphylum: Chelicerata
- Class: Arachnida
- Order: Araneae
- Infraorder: Araneomorphae
- Family: Araneidae
- Genus: Araneus
- Species: A. detrimentosus

Binomial name
- Araneus detrimentosus (O. P.-Cambridge, 1889)

= Araneus detrimentosus =

Species of spider

Araneus detrimentosus is a species of orb weaver in the spider family Araneidae. It is found in a range from the United States to Colombia.

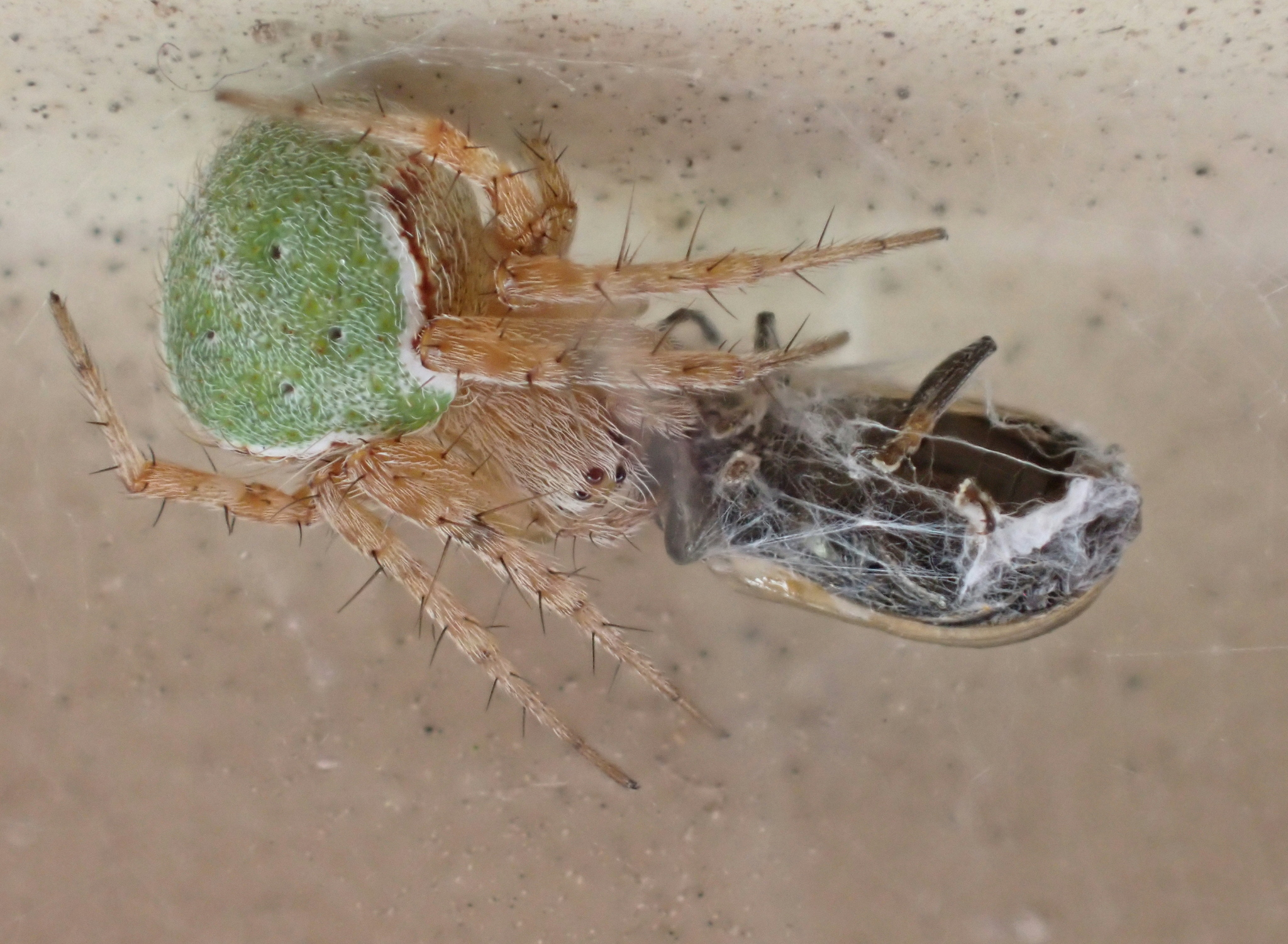
With a yellow-margined leaf beetle, in Texas
