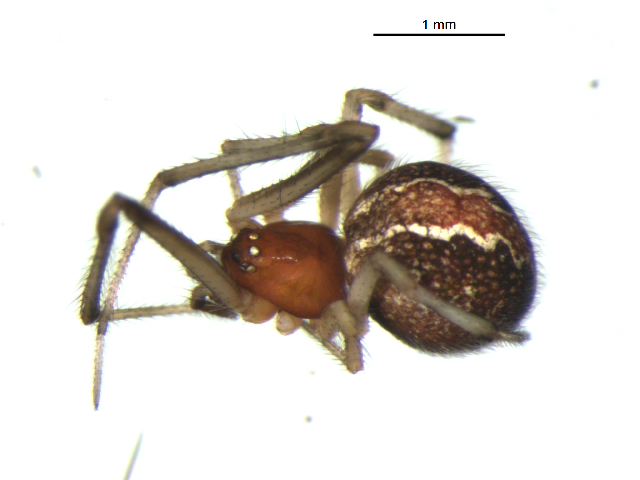
- T. differens, adult female
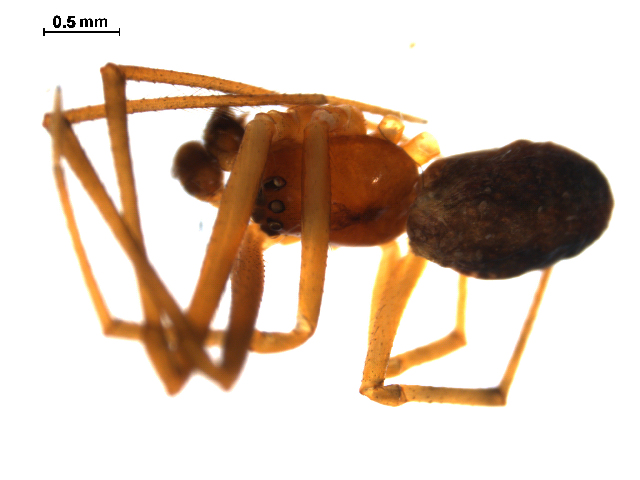
- T. differens, adult male

Scientific classification
- Kingdom: Animalia
- Phylum: Arthropoda
- Subphylum: Chelicerata
- Class: Arachnida
- Order: Araneae
- Infraorder: Araneomorphae
- Family: Theridiidae
- Genus: Theridion
- Species: T. differens

Binomial name
- Theridion differens Emerton, 1882

= Theridion differens =

Species of spider

Theridion differens is a species of cobweb spider in the family Theridiidae. It is found in the United States and Canada.
