= Steatoda variata =

Scientific classification
- Domain: Eukaryota
- Kingdom: Animalia
- Phylum: Arthropoda
- Subphylum: Chelicerata
- Class: Arachnida
- Order: Araneae
- Infraorder: Araneomorphae
- Family: Theridiidae
- Genus: Steatoda
- Species: S. variata

Binomial name
- Steatoda variata Gertsch, 1960

Species of spider

Steatoda variata is a species of cobweb spider in the family Theridiidae. It is found in the United States and Mexico.

== Subspecies ==
These two subspecies belong to the species Steatoda variata:

- (Steatoda variata variata) Gertsch, 1960
- Steatoda variata china Gertsch, 1960
