= Agelenopsis longistyla =

Scientific classification
- Kingdom: Animalia
- Phylum: Arthropoda
- Subphylum: Chelicerata
- Class: Arachnida
- Order: Araneae
- Infraorder: Araneomorphae
- Family: Agelenidae
- Genus: Agelenopsis
- Species: A. longistyla

Binomial name
- Agelenopsis longistyla (Banks, 1901)

Species of spider

Agelenopsis longistyla is a species of funnel weaver in the spider family Agelenidae. It was first described in 1901 by Nathan Banks. It is found in the central United States.

Excluding legs, this is the smallest species of the genus Agelenopsis.
