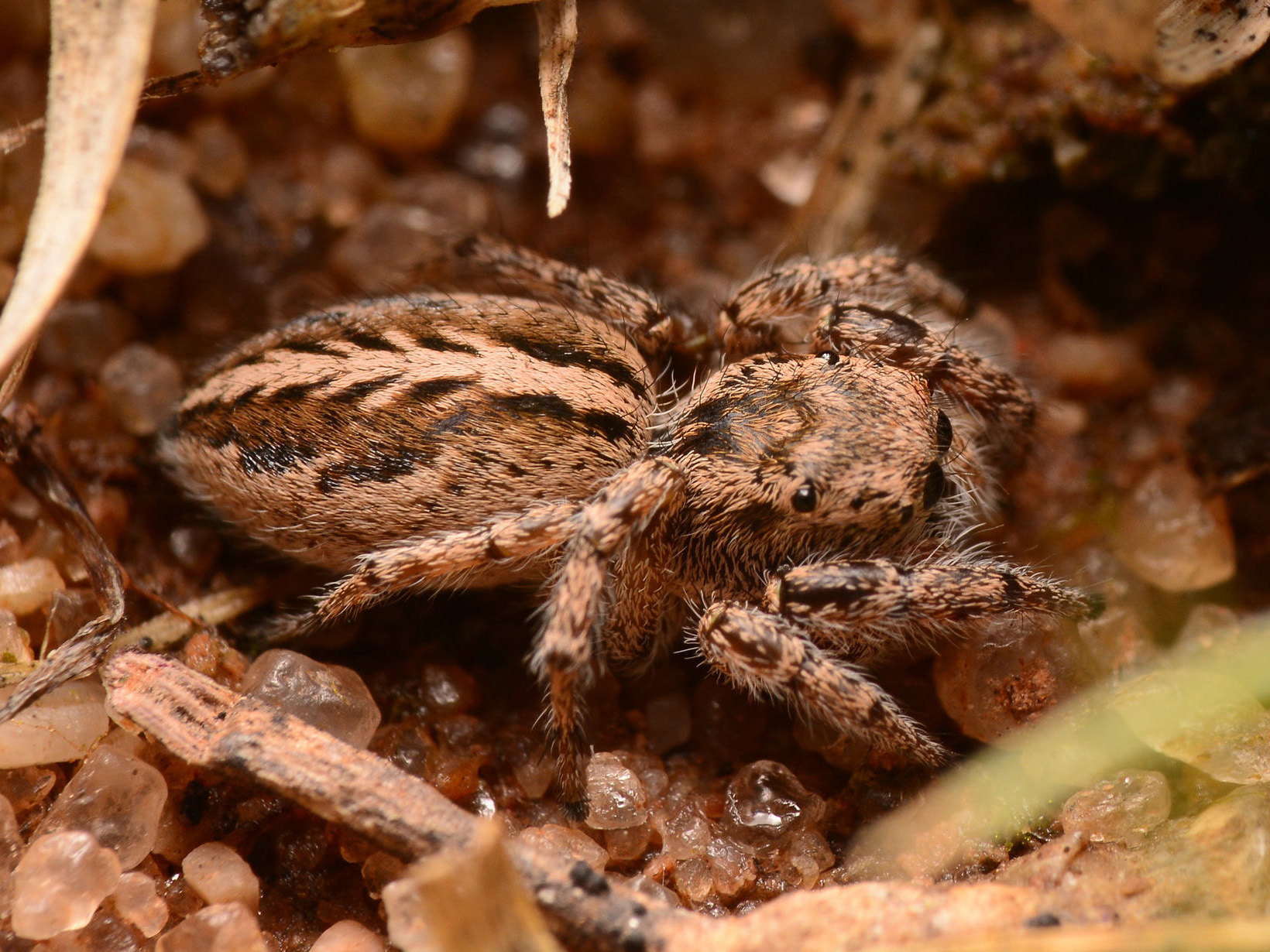
- Female
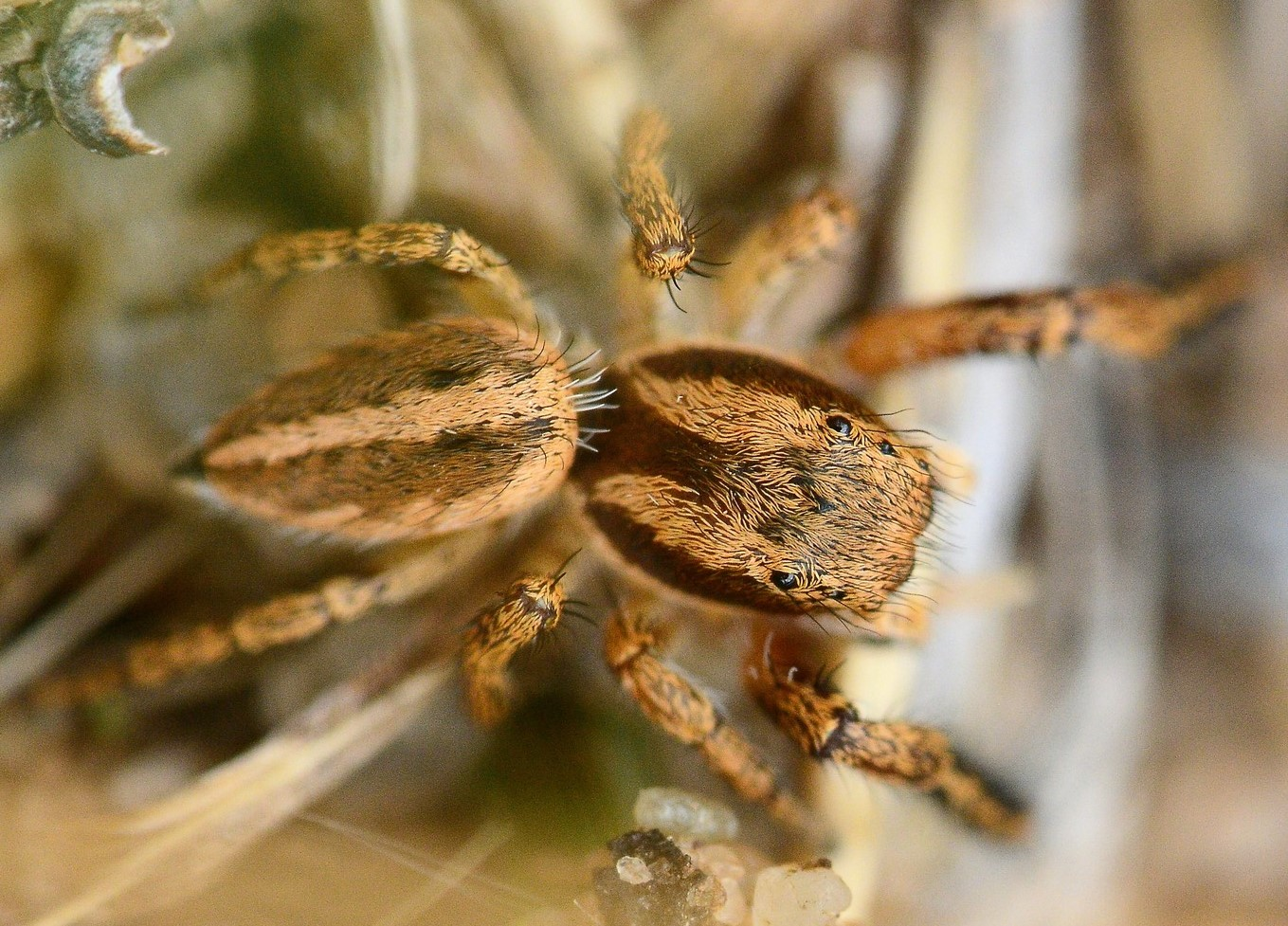
- Male

Scientific classification
- Kingdom: Animalia
- Phylum: Arthropoda
- Subphylum: Chelicerata
- Class: Arachnida
- Order: Araneae
- Infraorder: Araneomorphae
- Family: Salticidae
- Genus: Pellenes
- Species: P. limatus

Binomial name
- Pellenes limatus (Peckham and Peckham, 1901)

= Pellenes limatus =

Species of spider

Pellenes limatus is a species of jumping spider in the family Salticidae. It is found in the United States and Mexico.
