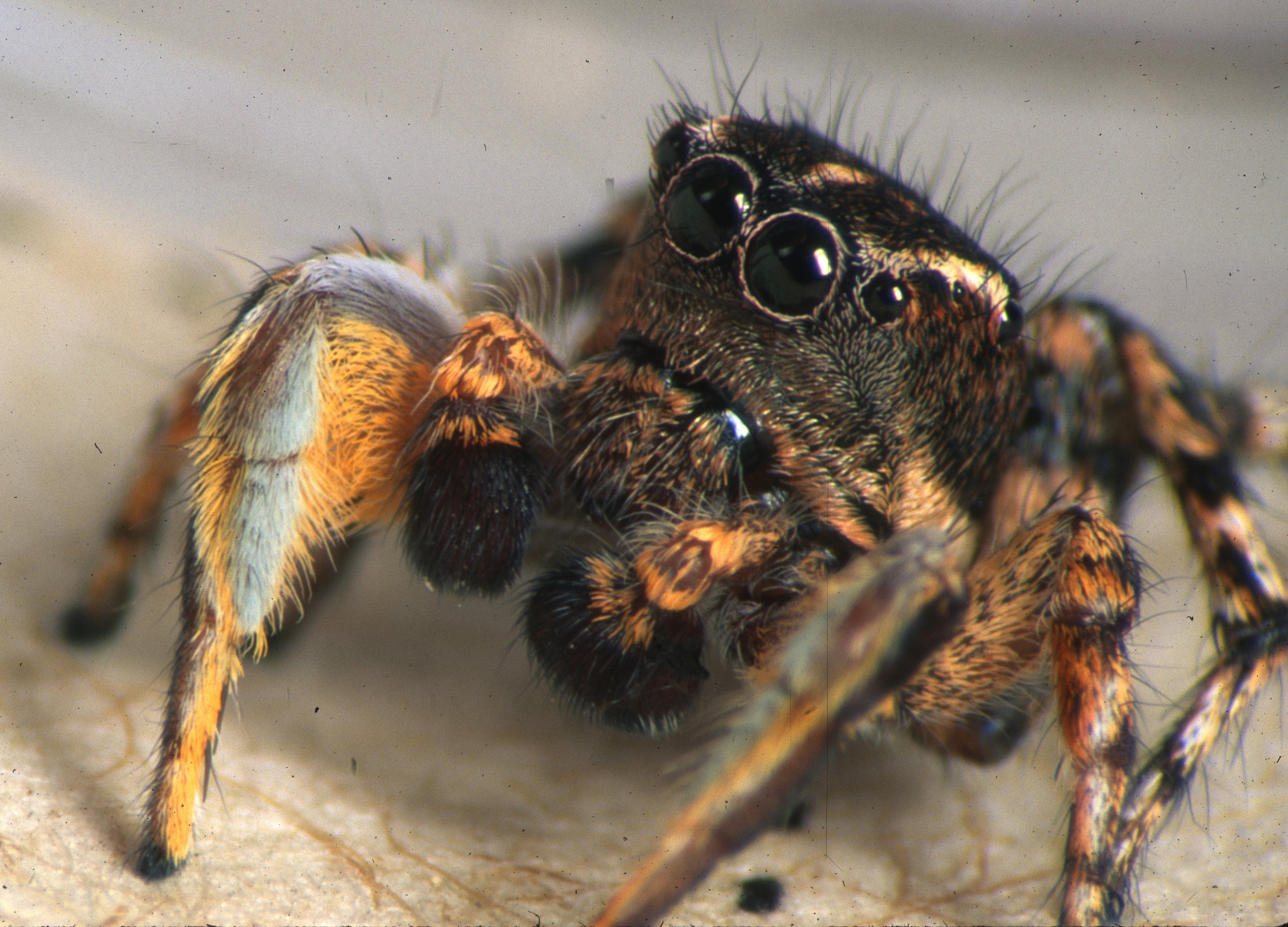
- Adult male

Scientific classification
- Kingdom: Animalia
- Phylum: Arthropoda
- Subphylum: Chelicerata
- Class: Arachnida
- Order: Araneae
- Infraorder: Araneomorphae
- Family: Salticidae
- Genus: Habronattus
- Species: H. mataxus

Binomial name
- Habronattus mataxus Griswold, 1987

= Habronattus mataxus =

Species of spider

Habronattus mataxus is a species of jumping spider found in Texas and northern Mexico.

== Description ==
Both males and females resemble Habronattus cognatus. The male differs by having a darker clypeus and no spines on the first tibia.

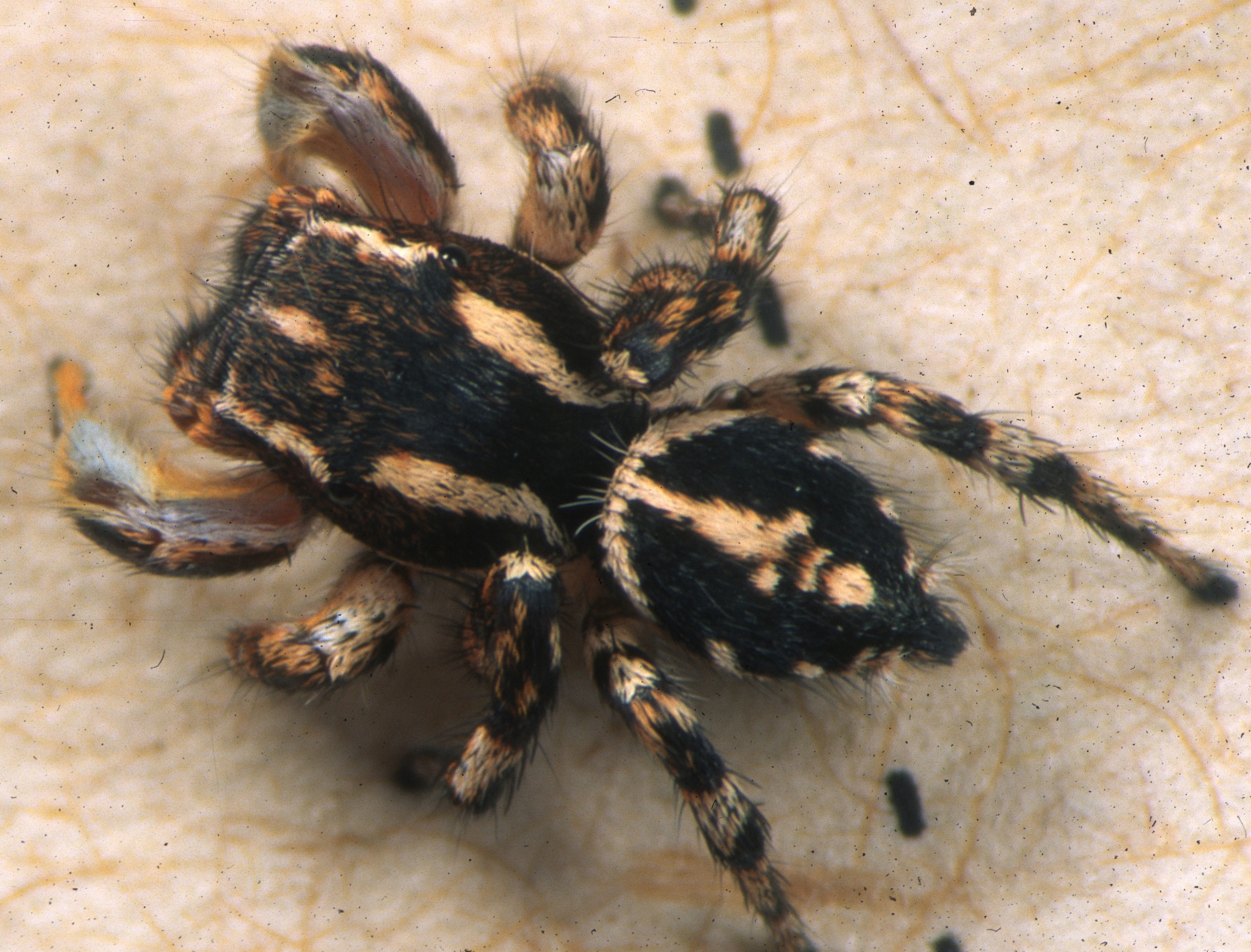
Adult male, dorsal view

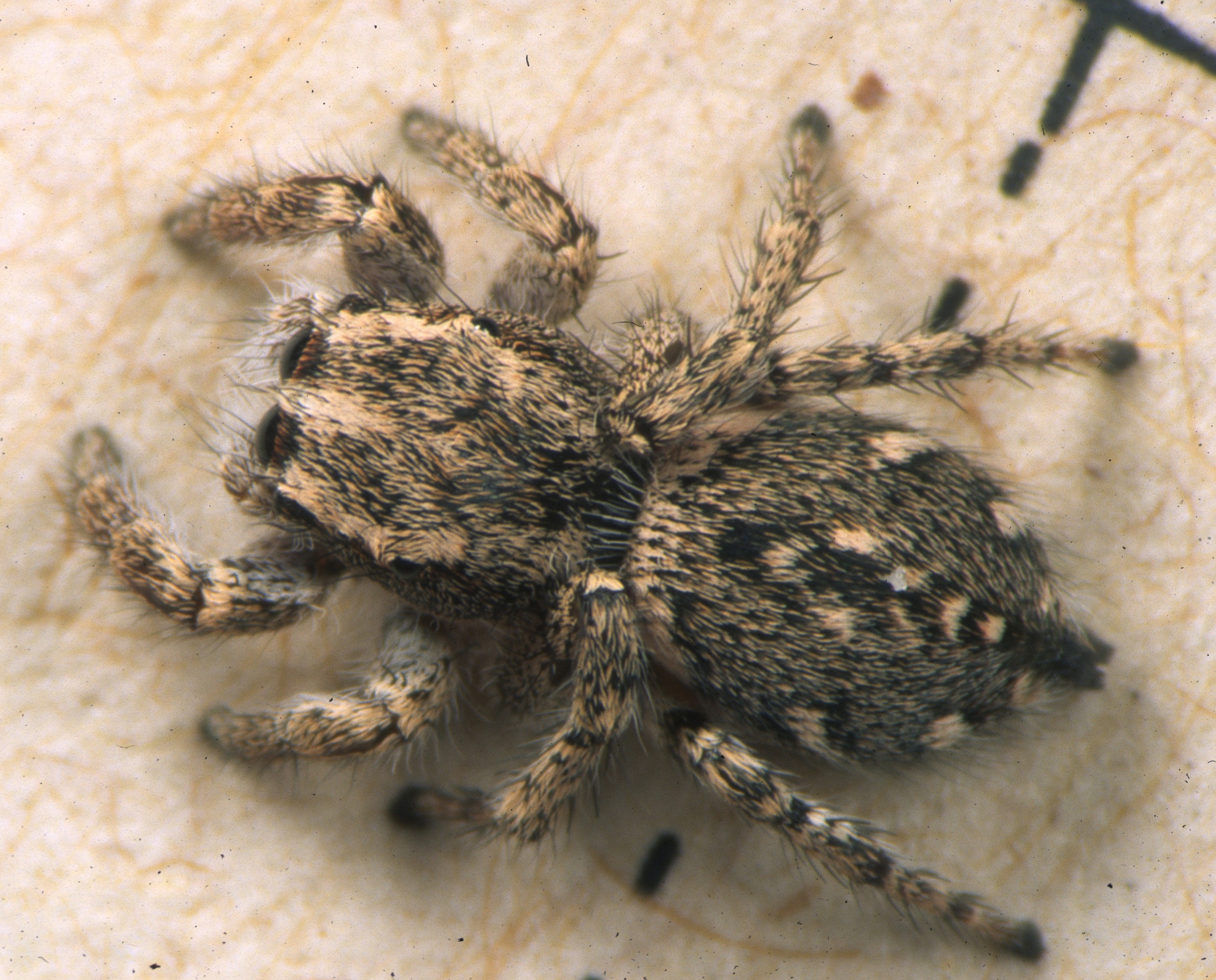
Adult female, dorsal view

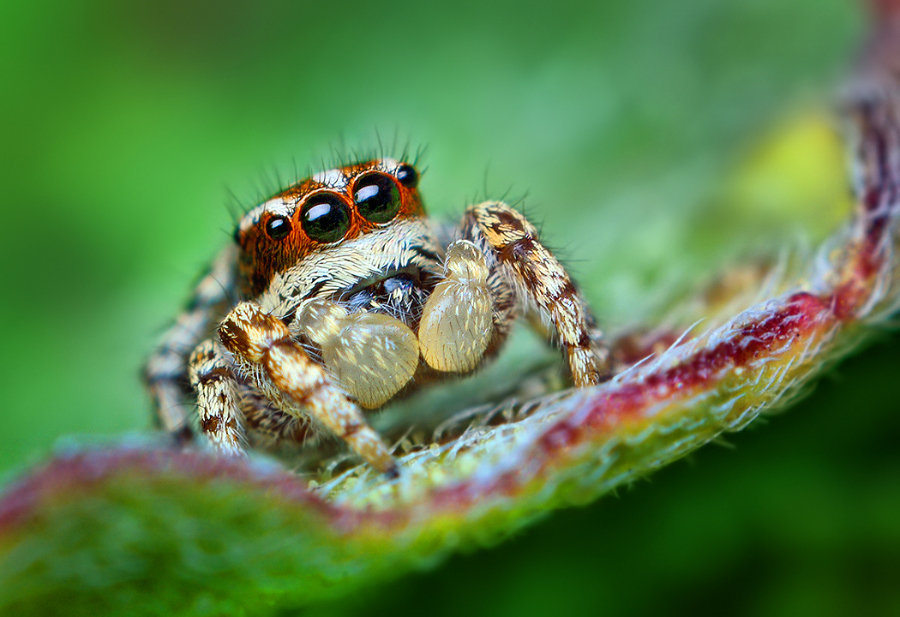
Sub-adult male
