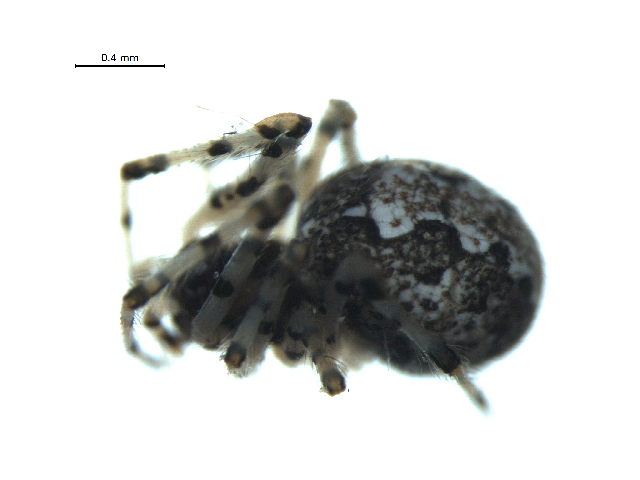
- T. rabuni, adult female

Scientific classification
- Kingdom: Animalia
- Phylum: Arthropoda
- Subphylum: Chelicerata
- Class: Arachnida
- Order: Araneae
- Infraorder: Araneomorphae
- Family: Theridiidae
- Genus: Theridion
- Species: T. rabuni

Binomial name
- Theridion rabuni Chamberlin & Ivie, 1944

= Theridion rabuni =

Species of spider

Theridion rabuni is a species of cobweb spider in the family Theridiidae. It is found in the United States and Bahama Islands.
