= Scotinella formica =

Scientific classification
- Domain: Eukaryota
- Kingdom: Animalia
- Phylum: Arthropoda
- Subphylum: Chelicerata
- Class: Arachnida
- Order: Araneae
- Infraorder: Araneomorphae
- Family: Phrurolithidae
- Genus: Scotinella
- Species: S. formica

Binomial name
- Scotinella formica (Banks, 1895)

Synonyms
- Phrurolithus formica Banks, 1895; Phruronellus formica (Banks, 1895)

Species of spider

Scotinella formica, synonyms including Phruronellus formica, is a species of true spider in the family Phrurolithidae. It is found in the United States.
