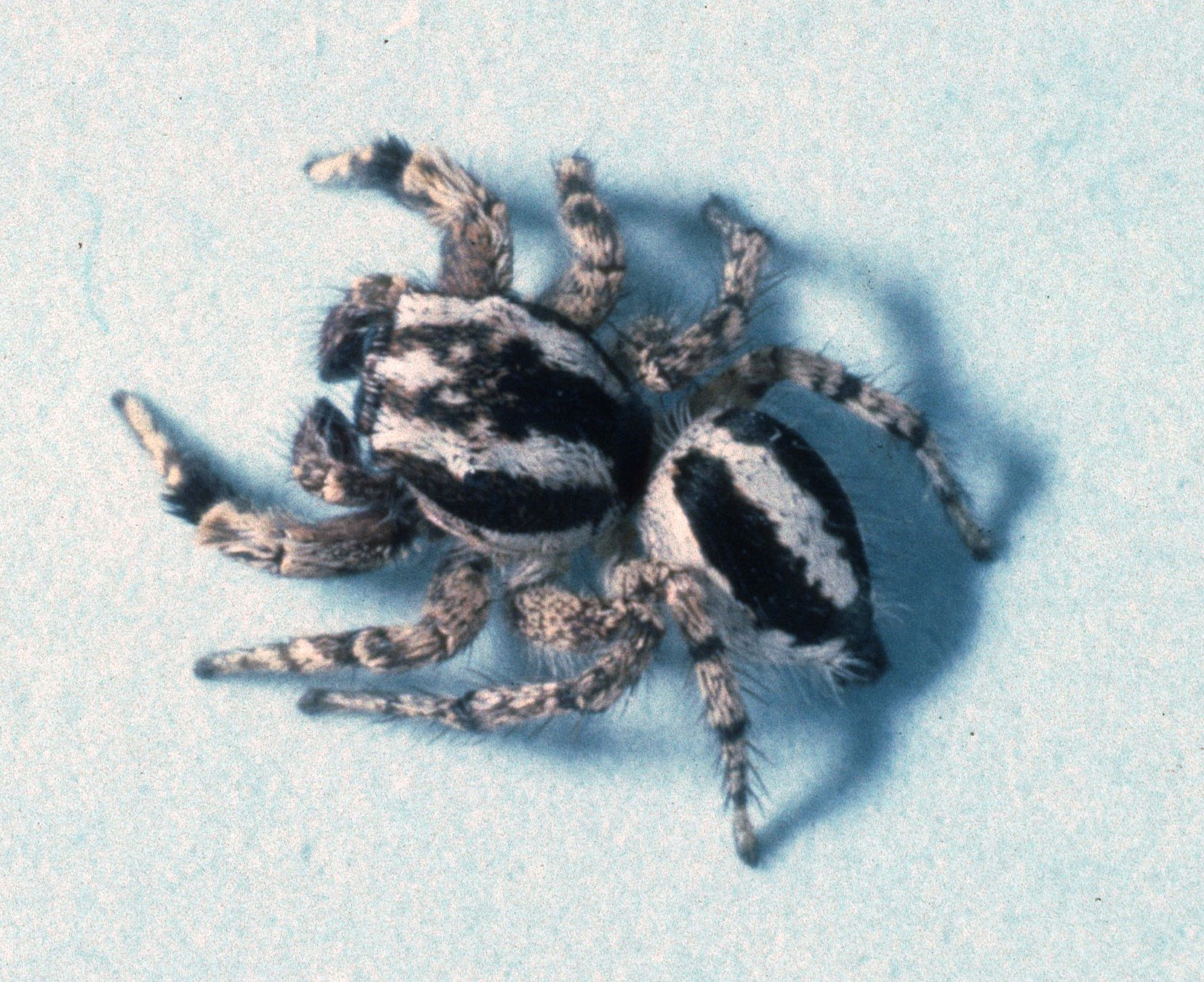
- Male in Essex County, Massachusetts

Scientific classification
- Kingdom: Animalia
- Phylum: Arthropoda
- Subphylum: Chelicerata
- Class: Arachnida
- Order: Araneae
- Infraorder: Araneomorphae
- Family: Salticidae
- Genus: Habronattus
- Species: H. agilis

Binomial name
- Habronattus agilis (Banks, 1893)

= Habronattus agilis =

Species of spider

Habronattus agilis is a species of jumping spider in the family Salticidae. It is found in the United States.
