= Habronattus sabulosus =

Scientific classification
- Kingdom: Animalia
- Phylum: Arthropoda
- Subphylum: Chelicerata
- Class: Arachnida
- Order: Araneae
- Infraorder: Araneomorphae
- Family: Salticidae
- Genus: Habronattus
- Species: H. sabulosus

Binomial name
- Habronattus sabulosus (Peckham & Peckham, 1901)

Species of spider

Habronattus sabulosus is a species of jumping spider in the family Salticidae. It is found in the southeastern United States.
