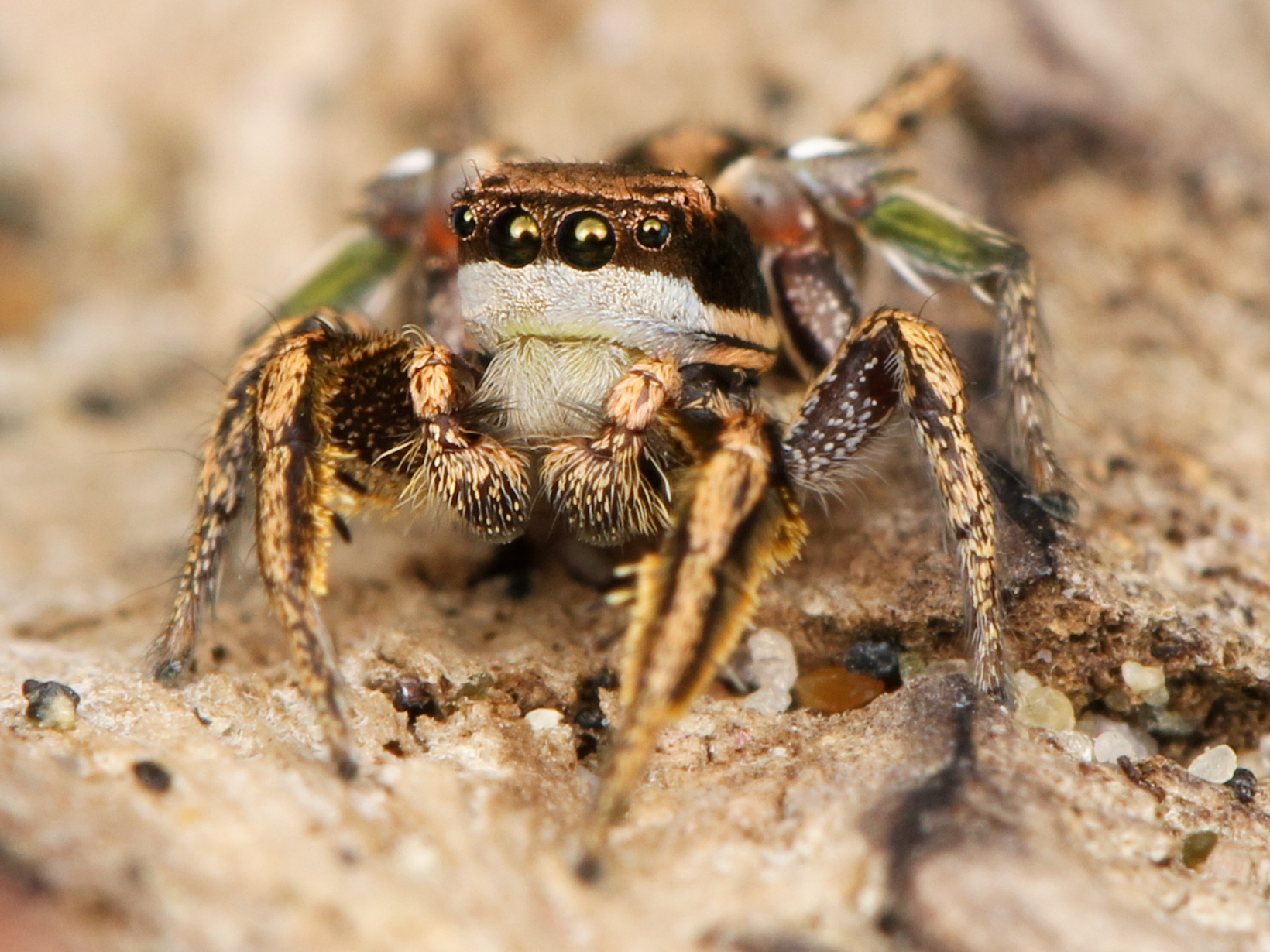
- Male in Lake County, California

Scientific classification
- Kingdom: Animalia
- Phylum: Arthropoda
- Subphylum: Chelicerata
- Class: Arachnida
- Order: Araneae
- Infraorder: Araneomorphae
- Family: Salticidae
- Genus: Habronattus
- Species: H. klauseri

Binomial name
- Habronattus klauseri (Peckham & Peckham, 1901)

= Habronattus klauseri =

Species of spider

Habronattus klauseri is a species of jumping spider. It is found in the western United States and Mexico.

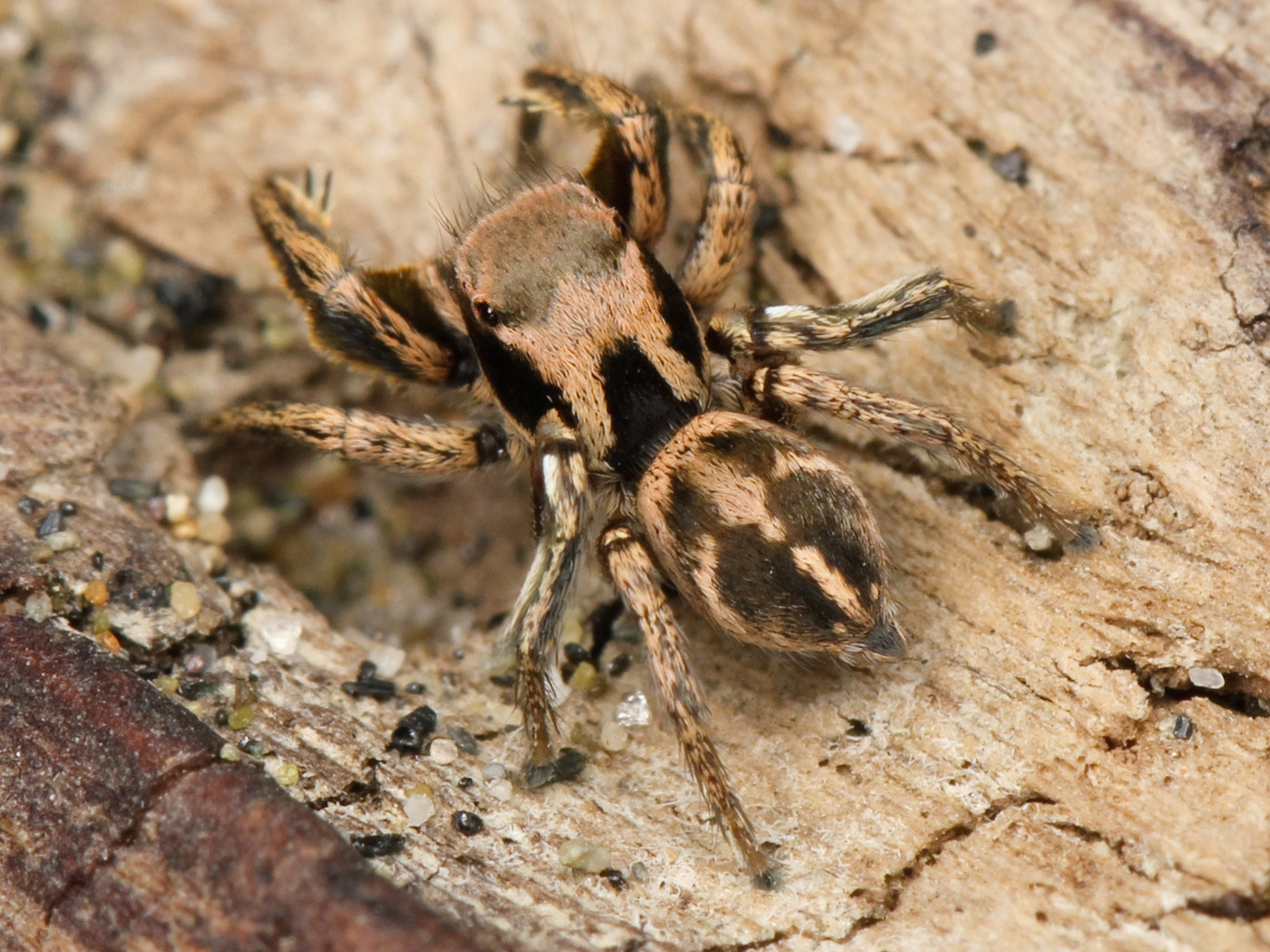
Dorsal view of male
