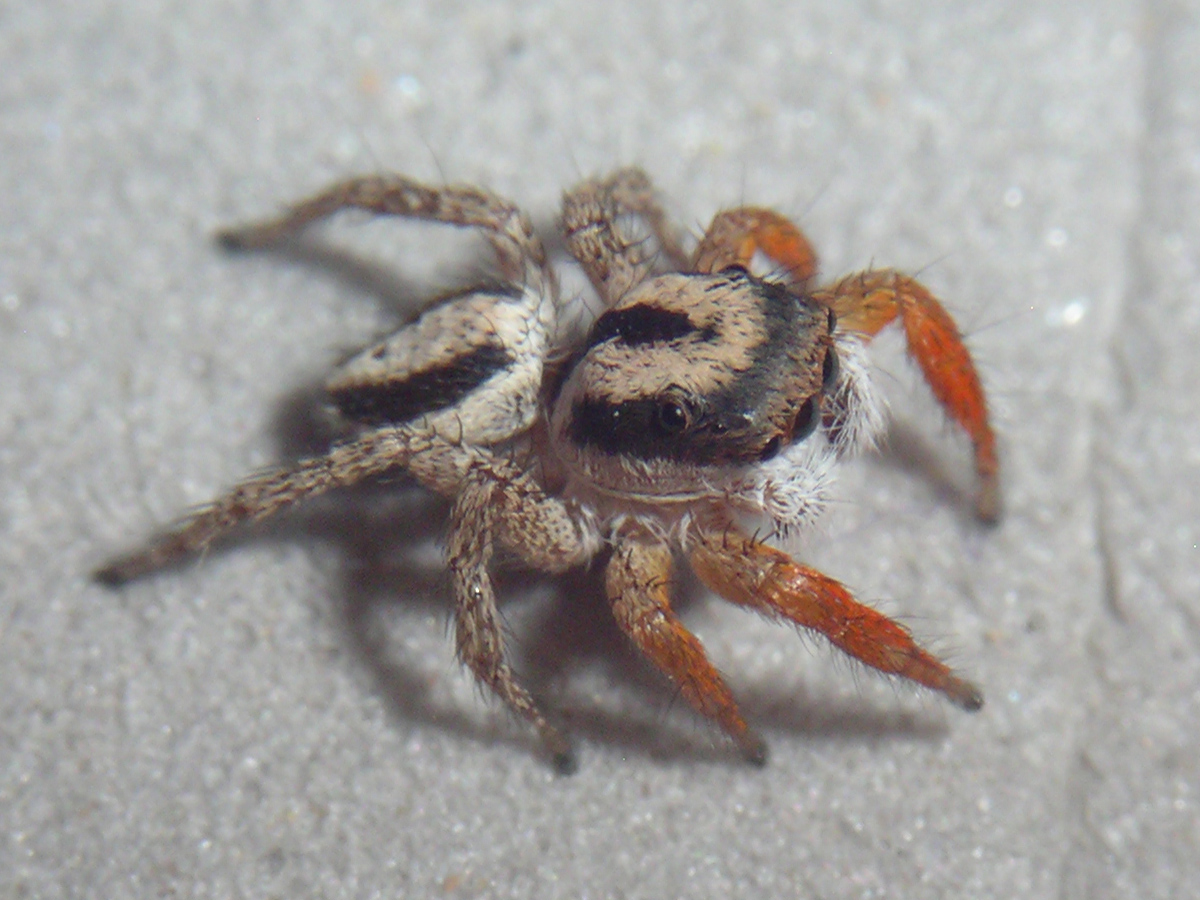

Scientific classification
- Kingdom: Animalia
- Phylum: Arthropoda
- Subphylum: Chelicerata
- Class: Arachnida
- Order: Araneae
- Infraorder: Araneomorphae
- Family: Salticidae
- Genus: Habronattus
- Species: H. icenoglei

Binomial name
- Habronattus icenoglei (Griswold, 1979)

= Habronattus icenoglei =

Species of spider

Habronattus icenoglei is a species of jumping spider (family Salticidae). It is found in the southwestern United States and north-central Mexico.

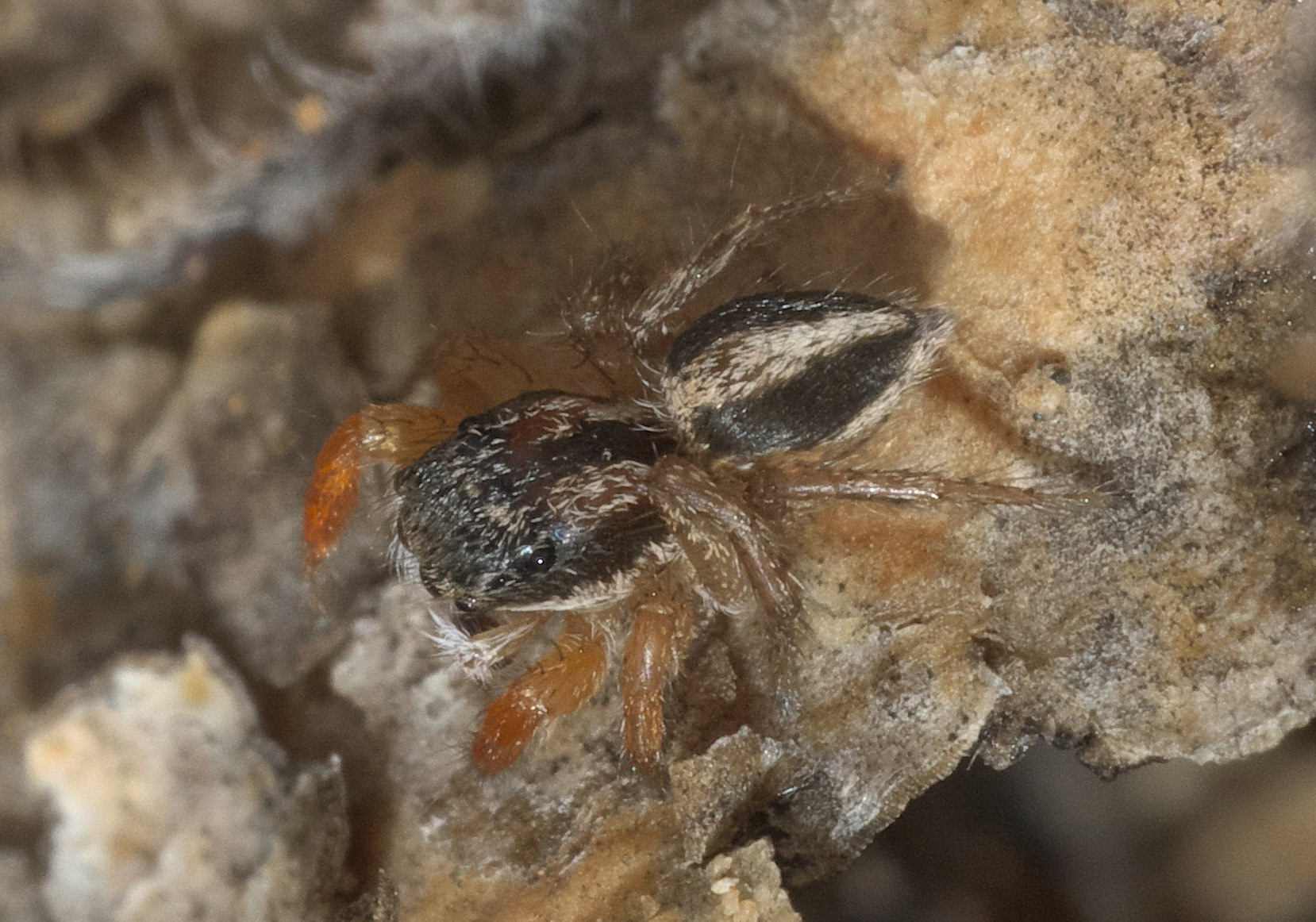
