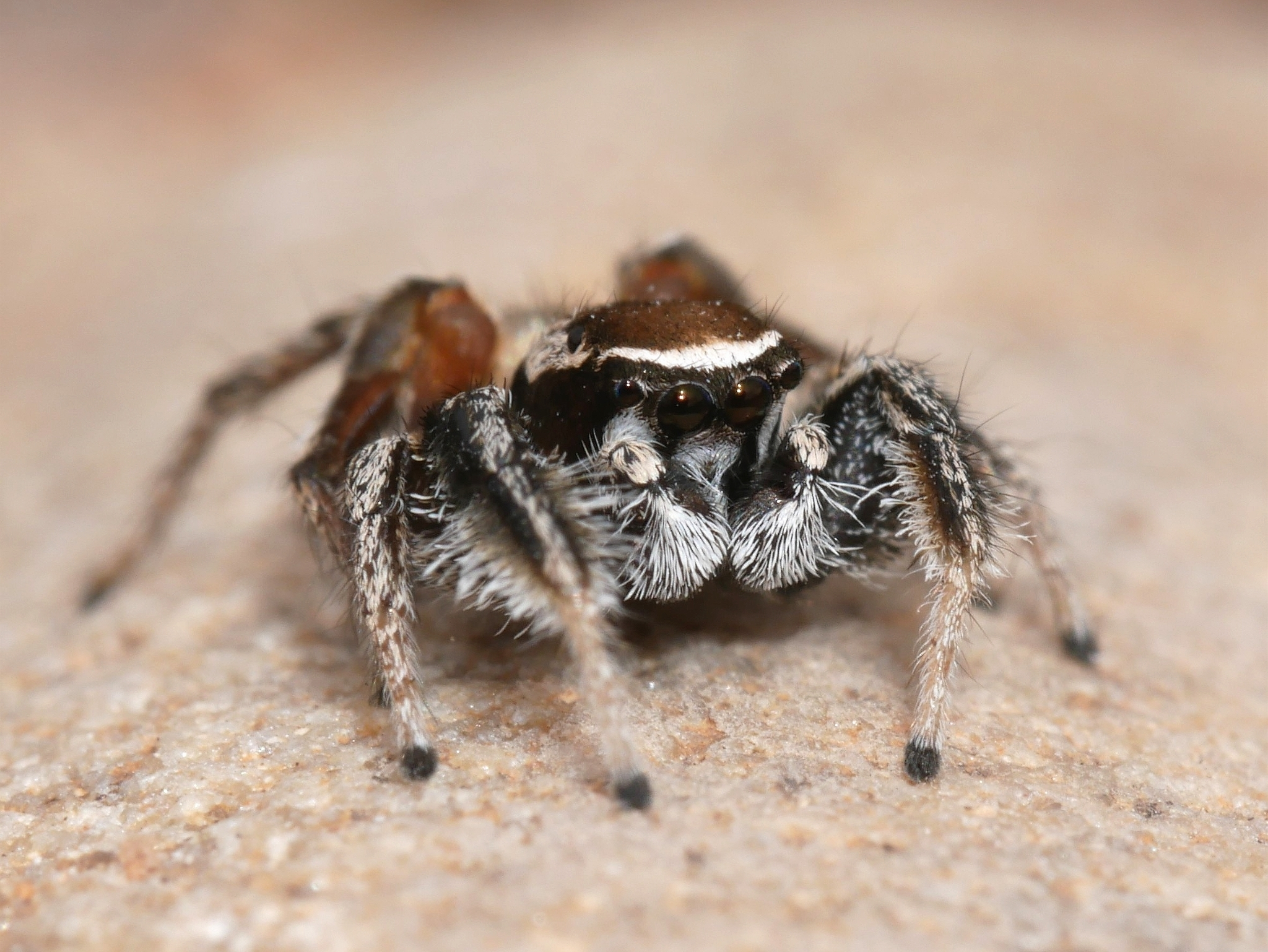
- Male

Scientific classification
- Kingdom: Animalia
- Phylum: Arthropoda
- Subphylum: Chelicerata
- Class: Arachnida
- Order: Araneae
- Infraorder: Araneomorphae
- Family: Salticidae
- Genus: Habronattus
- Species: H. clypeatus

Binomial name
- Habronattus clypeatus (Banks, 1895)

Synonyms
- Habrocestum clypeatum; Pellenes clypeatus

= Habronattus clypeatus =

Species of spider

Habronattus clypeatus is a species of jumping spider which occurs in the United States and Mexico. Its range extends from the southern Rocky Mountains to the northern Sierra Madre Occidental and Sonoran Desert. It belongs to the viridipes species group within the genus Habronattus.
