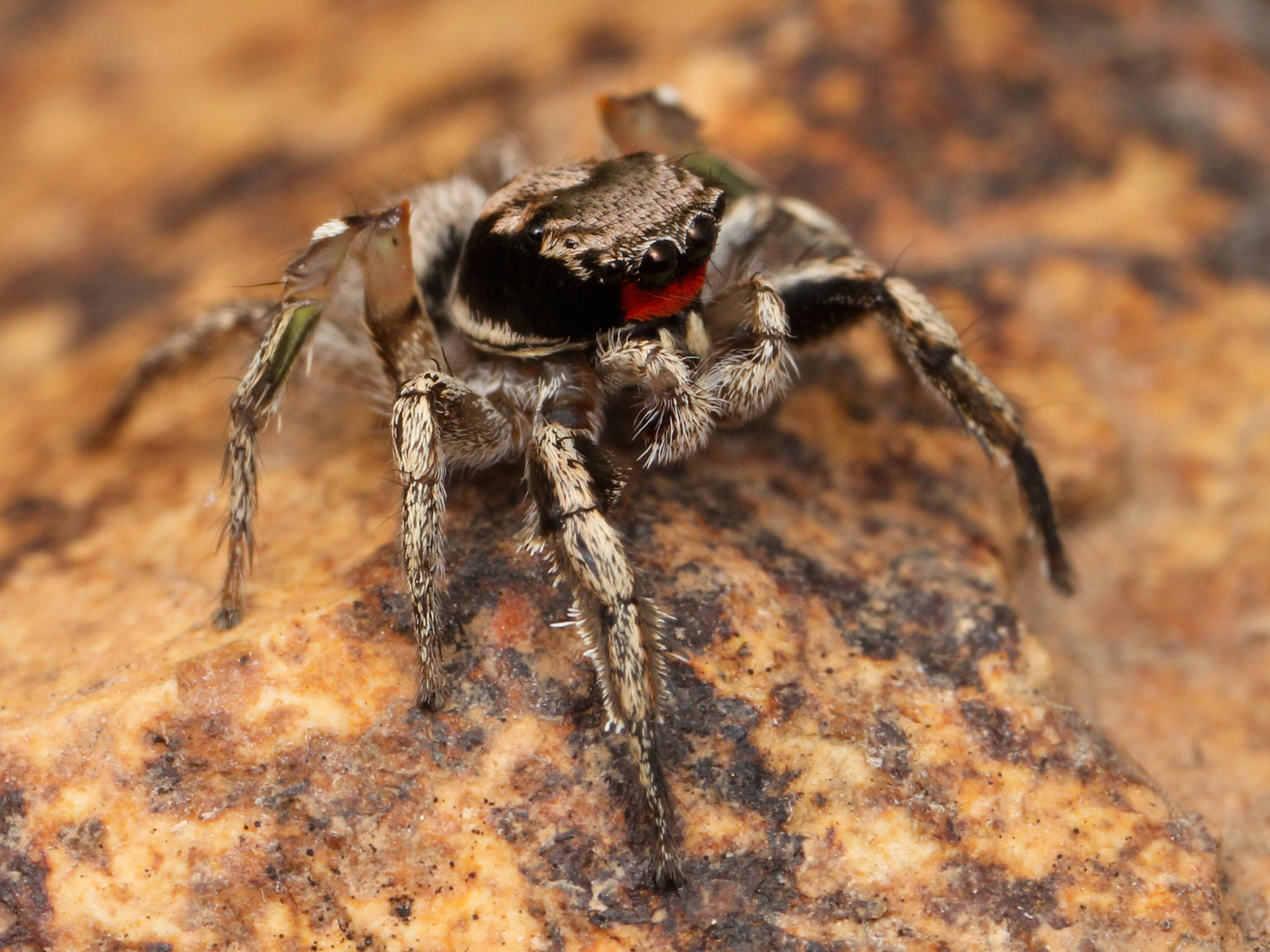
- Adult male Habronattus coecatus

Scientific classification
- Kingdom: Animalia
- Phylum: Arthropoda
- Subphylum: Chelicerata
- Class: Arachnida
- Order: Araneae
- Infraorder: Araneomorphae
- Family: Salticidae
- Subfamily: Salticinae
- Genus: Habronattus; F. O. P-Cambridge, 1901

Type species
- Habrocestum mexicanum Peckham & Peckham, 1896

Species
- See text.

= Habronattus =

Genus of spiders

Habronattus is a genus in the family Salticidae (jumping spiders). Most species are native to North America. They are commonly referred to as paradise spiders due to their colorful courtship ornaments and complex dances, similar to birds-of-paradise. Males display intricate coloration, while females are cryptic.

== Species ==
As of 2023, there were 105 recognized species and subspecies:

- Habronattus abditus Griswold, 1987 – Mexico
- Habronattus aestus Maddison, 2017 – Mexico
- Habronattus agilis (Banks, 1893) – USA
- Habronattus alachua Griswold, 1987 – USA
- Habronattus altanus (Gertsch, 1934) – Canada, USA, Mexico
- Habronattus americanus (Keyserling, 1885) – USA, Canada
- Habronattus amicus (Peckham & Peckham, 1909) – USA
- Habronattus ammophilus (Chamberlin, 1924) – Mexico
- Habronattus anepsius (Chamberlin, 1924) – USA, Mexico
- Habronattus arcalorus Maddison & Maddison, 2016 – USA, Mexico?
- Habronattus aztecanus (Banks, 1898) – Mexico
- Habronattus ballatoris Griswold, 1987 – USA
- Habronattus banksi (Peckham & Peckham, 1901) – Mexico to Panama, Jamaica
- Habronattus borealis (Banks, 1895) – USA, Canada
- Habronattus brunneus (Peckham & Peckham, 1901) – USA, Caribbean
- Habronattus bulbipes (Chamberlin & Ivie, 1941) – USA
- Habronattus calcaratus (Banks, 1904) – USA, Canada
- Habronattus californicus (Banks, 1904) – USA, Mexico
- Habronattus cambridgei Bryant, 1948 – Mexico to Guatemala
- Habronattus captiosus (Gertsch, 1934) – USA, Canada
- Habronattus carolinensis (Peckham & Peckham, 1901) – USA, Canada?
- Habronattus carpus Griswold, 1987 – Mexico
- Habronattus chamela Maddison, 2017 – Mexico
- Habronattus ciboneyanus Griswold, 1987 – Cuba, Jamaica
- Habronattus clypeatus (Banks, 1895) – USA, Mexico
- Habronattus cockerelli (Banks, 1901) – USA
- Habronattus coecatus (Hentz, 1846) – USA, Mexico, Bermuda
- Habronattus cognatus (Peckham & Peckham, 1901) – Canada, USA, Mexico
- Habronattus conjunctus (Banks, 1898) – USA, Mexico
- Habronattus contingens (Chamberlin, 1925) – Mexico
- Habronattus cuspidatus Griswold, 1987 – USA, Canada
- Habronattus decorus (Blackwall, 1846) – USA, Canada
- Habronattus delectus (Peckham & Peckham, 1909) – USA
- Habronattus divaricatus (Banks, 1898) – Mexico
- Habronattus dorotheae (Gertsch & Mulaik, 1936) – USA, Mexico
- Habronattus dossenus Griswold, 1987 – Mexico
- Habronattus elegans (Peckham & Peckham, 1901) – USA, Mexico
- Habronattus empyrus Maddison, 2017 – Mexico
- Habronattus encantadas Griswold, 1987 – Ecuador (Galapagos Is.)
- Habronattus ensenadae (Petrunkevitch, 1930) – Puerto Rico
- Habronattus facetus (Petrunkevitch, 1930) – Puerto Rico
- Habronattus fallax (Peckham & Peckham, 1909) – USA, Mexico
- Habronattus festus (Peckham & Peckham, 1901) – USA
- Habronattus formosus (Banks, 1906) – USA
- Habronattus forticulus (Gertsch & Mulaik, 1936) – USA, Mexico
- Habronattus georgiensis (Chamberlin & Ivie, 1944) – USA
- Habronattus geronimoi Griswold, 1987 – USA, Mexico, Nicaragua
- Habronattus gigas Griswold, 1987 – Mexico
- Habronattus gilaensis Maddison & Maddison, 2016 – USA
- Habronattus hallani (Richman, 1973) – USA, Mexico
- Habronattus hirsutus (Peckham & Peckham, 1888) – Canada, USA, Mexico
- Habronattus huastecanus Griswold, 1987 – Mexico
- Habronattus icenoglei (Griswold, 1979) – USA, Mexico
- Habronattus iviei Griswold, 1987 – Mexico
- Habronattus jucundus (Peckham & Peckham, 1909) – USA, Canada
- Habronattus kawini (Griswold, 1979) – USA, Mexico
- Habronattus klauseri (Peckham & Peckham, 1901) – USA, Mexico
- Habronattus kubai (Griswold, 1979) – USA
- Habronattus leuceres (Chamberlin, 1925) – USA
- Habronattus luminosus Maddison, 2017 – USA
- Habronattus mataxus Griswold, 1987 – USA, Mexico
- Habronattus mexicanus (Peckham & Peckham, 1896) * – USA to Panama, Caribbean
- Habronattus moratus (Gertsch & Mulaik, 1936) – USA, Mexico
- Habronattus mustaciatus (Chamberlin & Ivie, 1941) – USA
- Habronattus nahuatlanus Griswold, 1987 – Mexico
- Habronattus nemoralis (Peckham & Peckham, 1901) – USA
- Habronattus neomexicanus (Chamberlin, 1925) – USA
- Habronattus nesiotus Griswold, 1987 – Bermuda
- Habronattus notialis Griswold, 1987 – USA
- Habronattus ocala Griswold, 1987 – USA
- Habronattus ophrys Griswold, 1987 – USA
- Habronattus orbus Griswold, 1987 – USA
- Habronattus oregonensis (Peckham & Peckham, 1888) – Canada, USA, Mexico
- Habronattus paratus (Peckham & Peckham, 1896) – Central America
- Habronattus peckhami (Banks, 1921) – USA
- Habronattus pochtecanus Griswold, 1987 – Mexico
- Habronattus pretiosus Bryant, 1947 – Puerto Rico, Virgin Is.
- Habronattus pugillis Griswold, 1987 – USA, Mexico
- Habronattus pyrrithrix (Chamberlin, 1924) – USA, Mexico
- Habronattus renidens Griswold, 1987 – Mexico
- Habronattus roberti Maddison, 2017 – Mexico
- Habronattus sabulosus (Peckham & Peckham, 1901) – USA
- Habronattus sansoni (Emerton, 1915) – USA, Canada
- Habronattus schlingeri (Griswold, 1979) – USA, Mexico
- Habronattus signatus (Banks, 1900) – USA, Mexico
- Habronattus simplex (Peckham & Peckham, 1901) – Mexico
- Habronattus sugillatus Griswold, 1987 – USA, Mexico
- Habronattus superciliosus (Peckham & Peckham, 1901) – USA
- Habronattus tarascanus Griswold, 1987 – Mexico
- Habronattus tarsalis (Banks, 1904) – USA. Introduced to Hawaii
- Habronattus texanus (Chamberlin, 1924) – USA, Mexico
- Habronattus tlaxcalanus Griswold, 1987 – Mexico
- Habronattus tranquillus (Peckham & Peckham, 1901) – USA, Mexico
- Habronattus trimaculatus Bryant, 1945 – USA
- Habronattus tuberculatus (Gertsch & Mulaik, 1936) – USA
- Habronattus ustulatus (Griswold, 1979) – USA, Mexico
- Habronattus velivolus Griswold, 1987 – Mexico
- Habronattus venatoris Griswold, 1987 – USA
- Habronattus virgulatus Griswold, 1987 – USA, Mexico
- Habronattus viridipes (Hentz, 1846) – USA, Canada
- Habronattus waughi (Emerton, 1926) – Canada
- Habronattus zapotecanus Griswold, 1987 – Mexico
- Habronattus zebraneus F. O. Pickard-Cambridge, 1901 – Mexico
