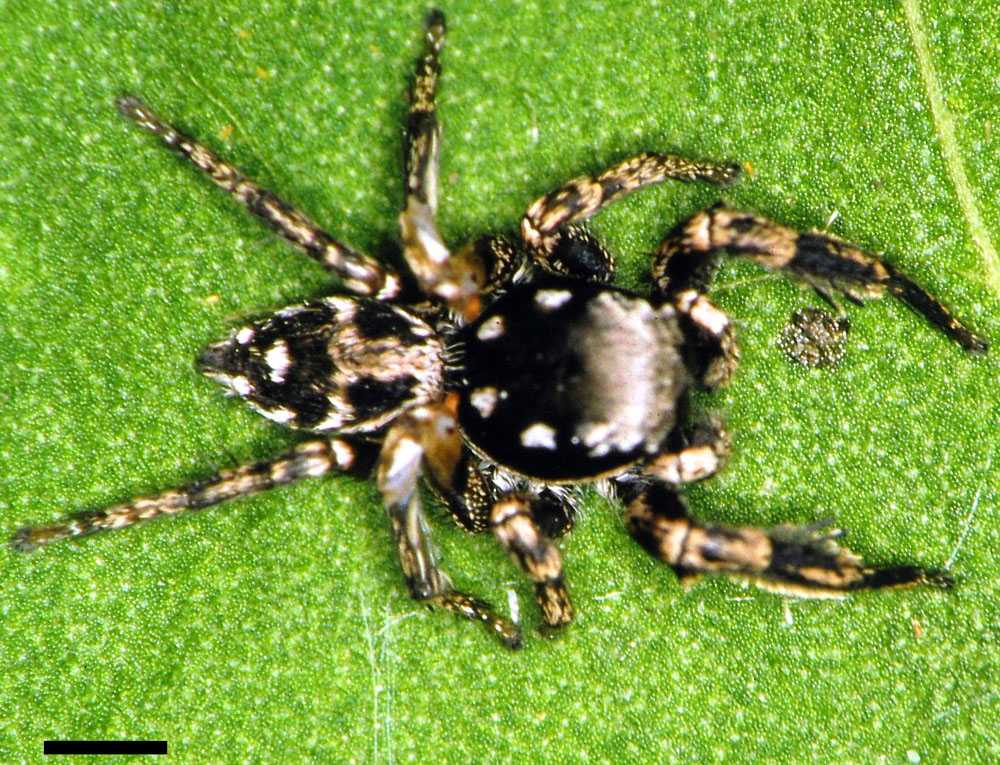
- Adult male Habronattus brunneus from near Gainesville, Florida

Scientific classification
- Kingdom: Animalia
- Phylum: Arthropoda
- Subphylum: Chelicerata
- Class: Arachnida
- Order: Araneae
- Infraorder: Araneomorphae
- Family: Salticidae
- Genus: Habronattus
- Species: H. brunneus

Binomial name
- Habronattus brunneus (Peckham & Peckham, 1901)

= Habronattus brunneus =

Species of spider

Habronattus brunneus is a species of jumping spider in the family Salticidae. It was discovered by George and Elizabeth Peckham in 1901. It is found in the United States and in the Caribbean, where it has been recorded from the Bahamas, the Dominican Republic, Haiti, Hispaniola Island, and the Virgin Islands.

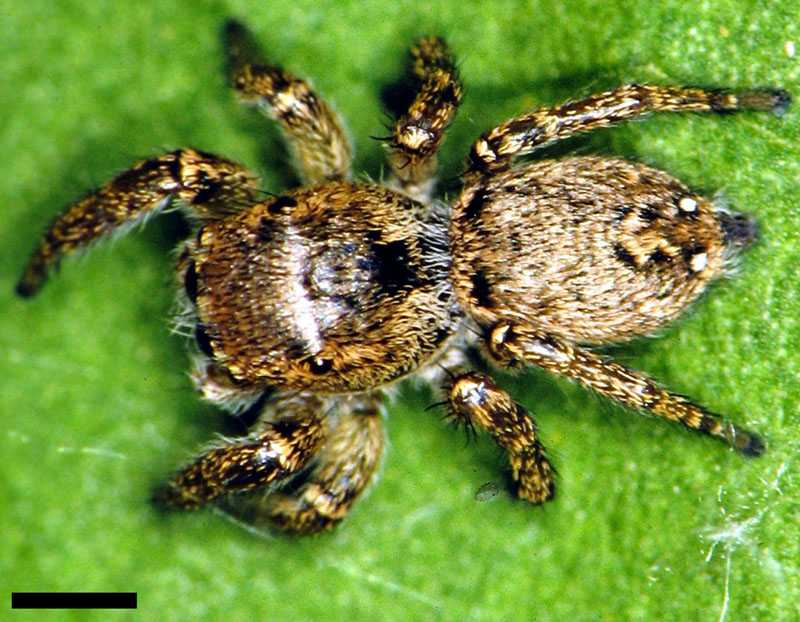
Adult female Habronattus brunneus from near Gainseville, Florida
