= Habronattus sansoni =

Scientific classification
- Kingdom: Animalia
- Phylum: Arthropoda
- Subphylum: Chelicerata
- Class: Arachnida
- Order: Araneae
- Infraorder: Araneomorphae
- Family: Salticidae
- Genus: Habronattus
- Species: H. sansoni

Binomial name
- Habronattus sansoni (Emerton, 1915)

Species of spider

Habronattus sansoni is a species of jumping spider in the family Salticidae. It is found in the United States and Canada.

The Harbonattus Sansoi have a unique mating style. The Harbonattus Sansoi Males like to have many courtships with multiple different partners, while the Female Harbonattus Sansoi often mates only once. The male Harbonattus Sansoi is smaller in size compared to females near it in the phylogenetic tree, making it less likely to mate and hybridize.
