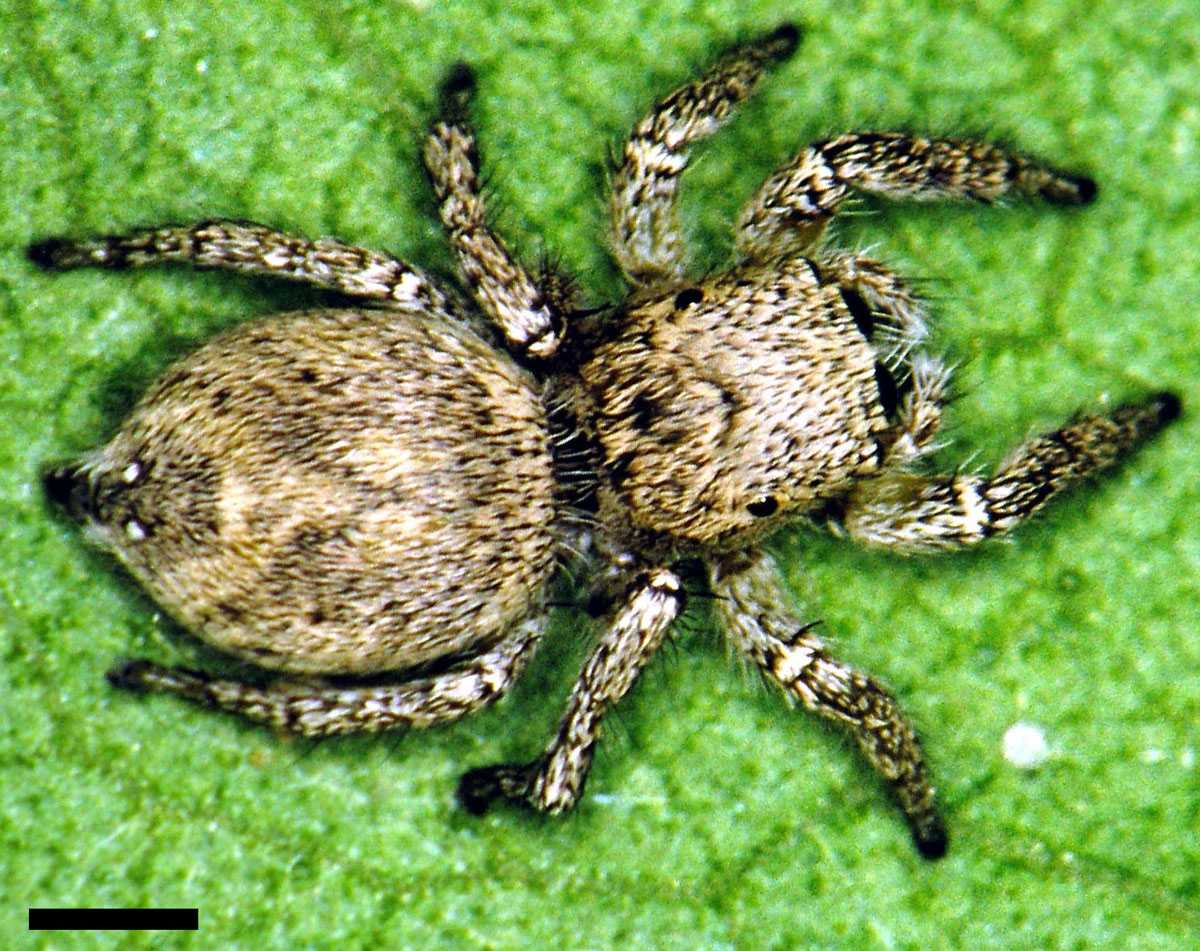
- Female H. c. calcaratus
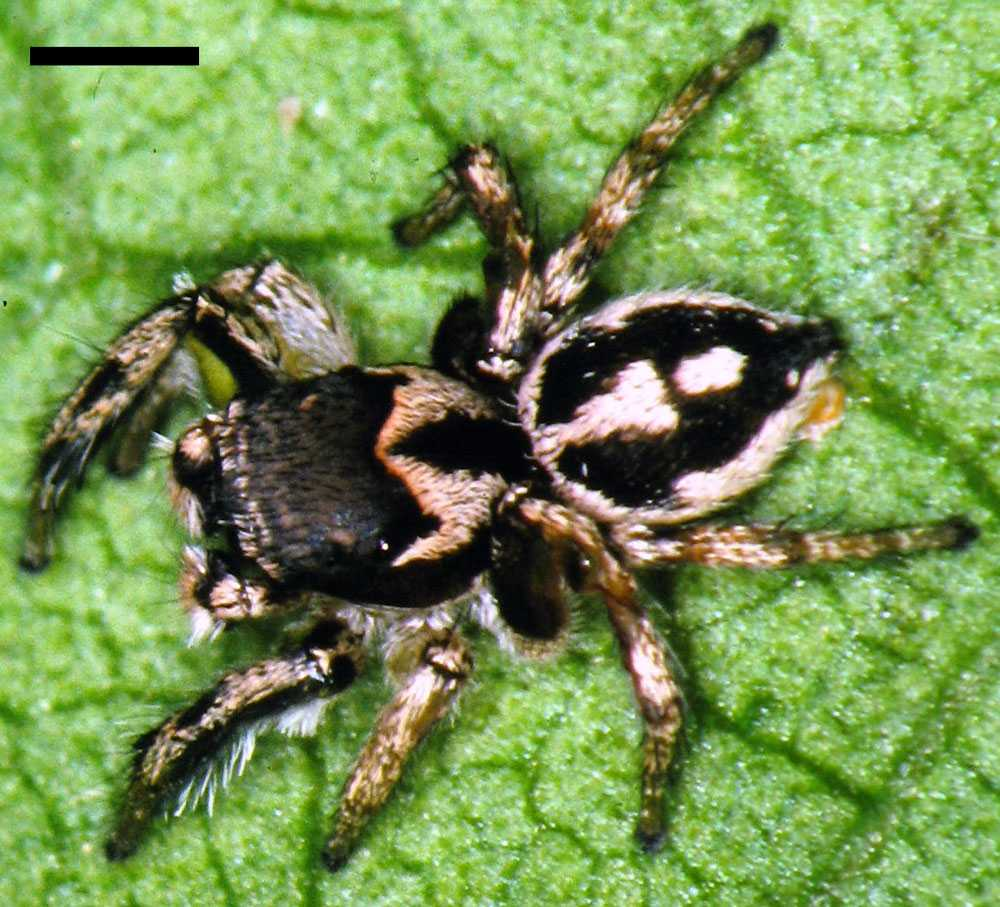
- Male H. c. calcaratus

Scientific classification
- Kingdom: Animalia
- Phylum: Arthropoda
- Subphylum: Chelicerata
- Class: Arachnida
- Order: Araneae
- Infraorder: Araneomorphae
- Family: Salticidae
- Genus: Habronattus
- Species: H. calcaratus

Binomial name
- Habronattus calcaratus (Banks, 1904)

Subspecies
- Habronattus calcaratus calcaratus; Habronattus calcaratus maddisoni; Habronattus calcaratus agricola

= Habronattus calcaratus =

Species of spider

Habronattus calcaratus is a species of jumping spider that can be found in the United States and Canada.

== Subspecies ==
There are three recognized subspecies: H. c. agricola from the Great Plains (South Dakota to Texas); H. c. calcaratus from Florida; and H. c. maddisoni from the eastern U.S. and Canada.
