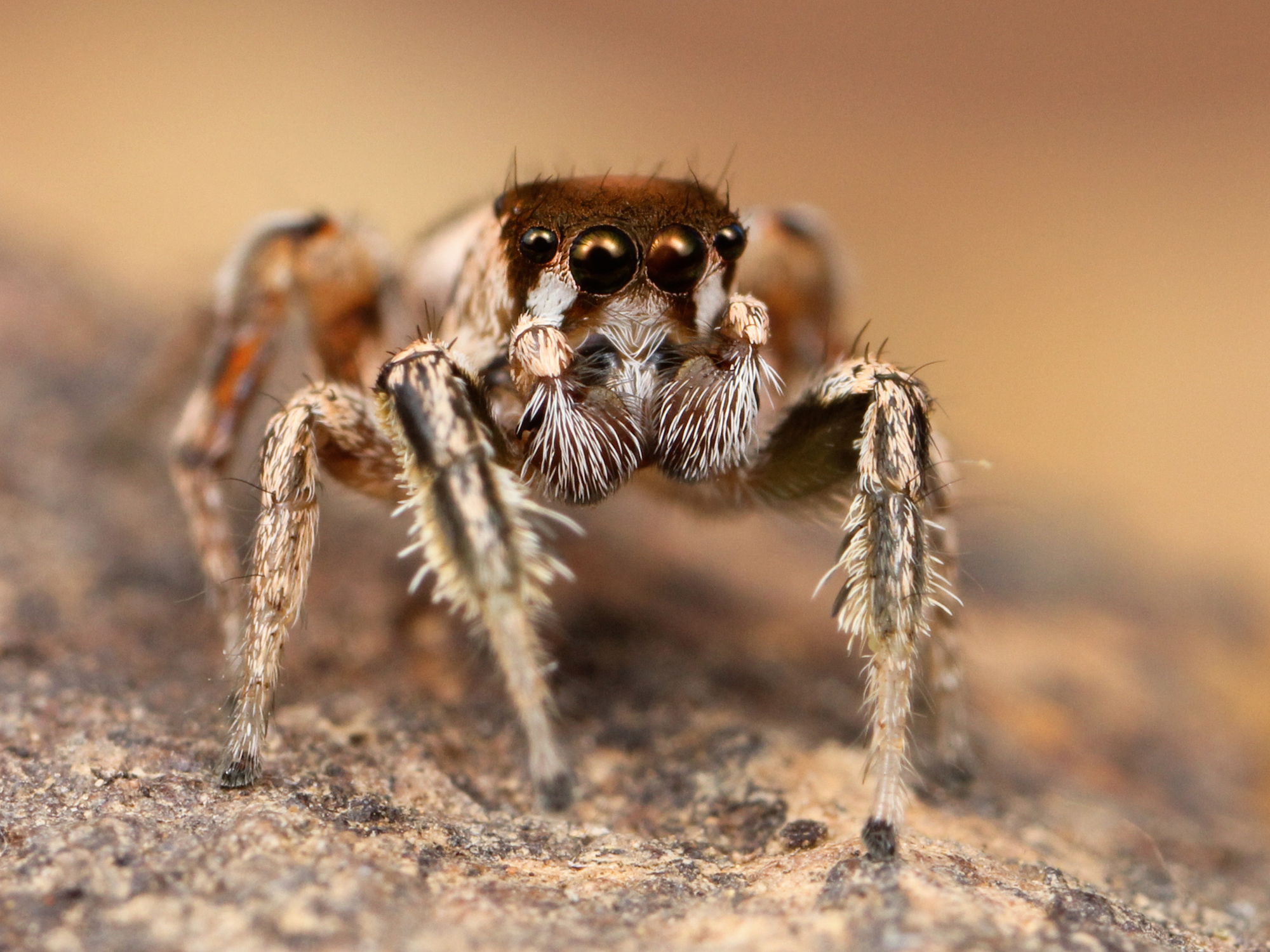
- Male

Scientific classification
- Kingdom: Animalia
- Phylum: Arthropoda
- Subphylum: Chelicerata
- Class: Arachnida
- Order: Araneae
- Infraorder: Araneomorphae
- Family: Salticidae
- Genus: Habronattus
- Species: H. dossenus

Binomial name
- Habronattus dossenus Griswold, 1987

= Habronattus dossenus =

Species of spider

Habronattus dossenus is a species of jumping spider. It is found in Mexico and the southwestern United States. They are most well known for their unique dynamic signals such as scraping, thumping, buzzing, and/or buzzing. It has been shown that there is a strong correlation between their seismic (vibration) signals and motion signals, suggesting that H. dossenus utilize inter-signal interactions to create integrative communication. These seismic signals can range from rapid phasic sounds that are less than 200 milliseconds long to long phrases lasting multiple seconds.

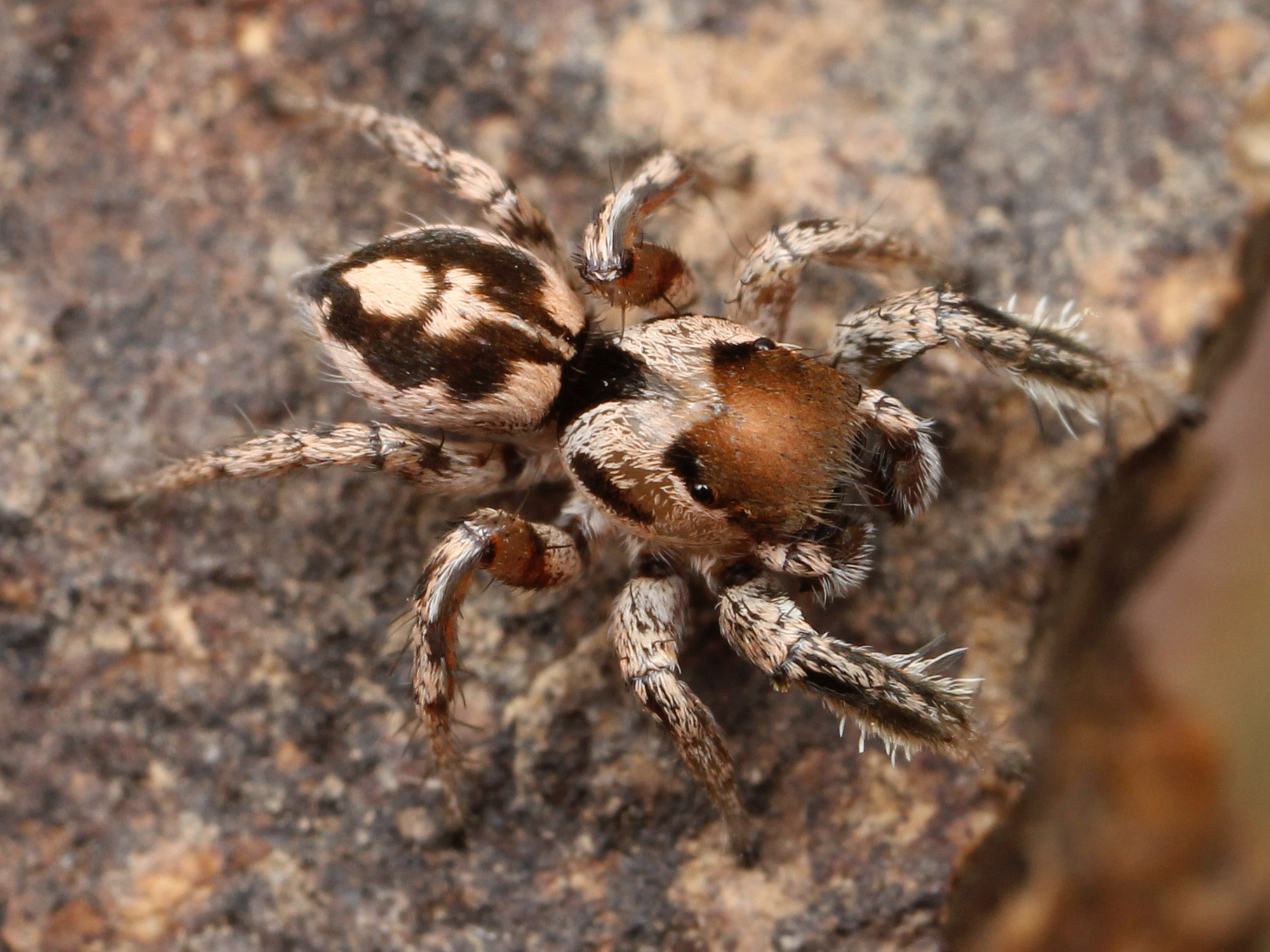
Male from Arizona
