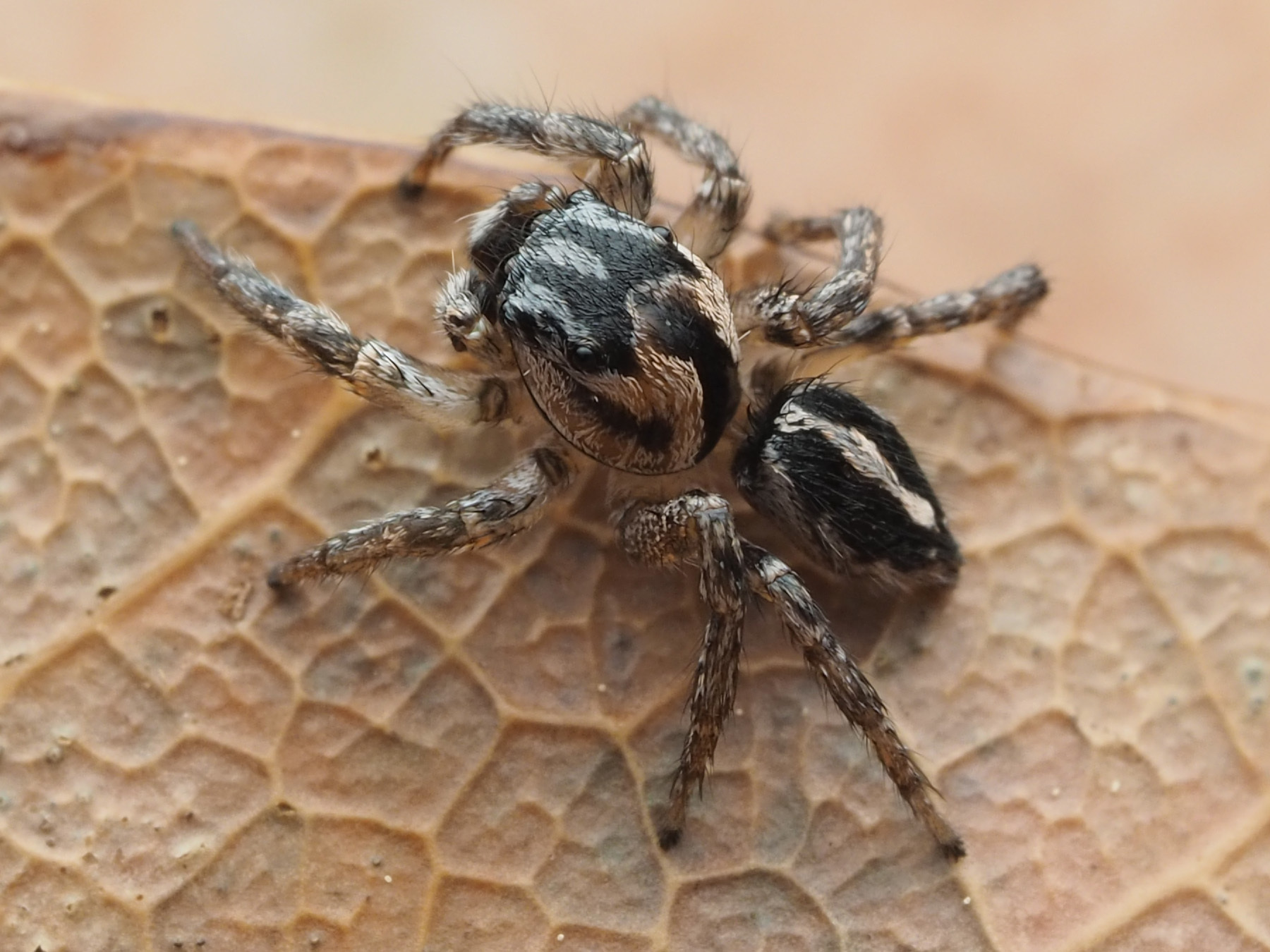
- Male Habronattus trimaculatus

Scientific classification
- Kingdom: Animalia
- Phylum: Arthropoda
- Subphylum: Chelicerata
- Class: Arachnida
- Order: Araneae
- Infraorder: Araneomorphae
- Family: Salticidae
- Genus: Habronattus
- Species: H. trimaculatus

Binomial name
- Habronattus trimaculatus Bryant, 1945

= Habronattus trimaculatus =

Species of spider

Habronattus trimaculatus is a species of jumping spider. It is found only in peninsular Florida in the United States.
