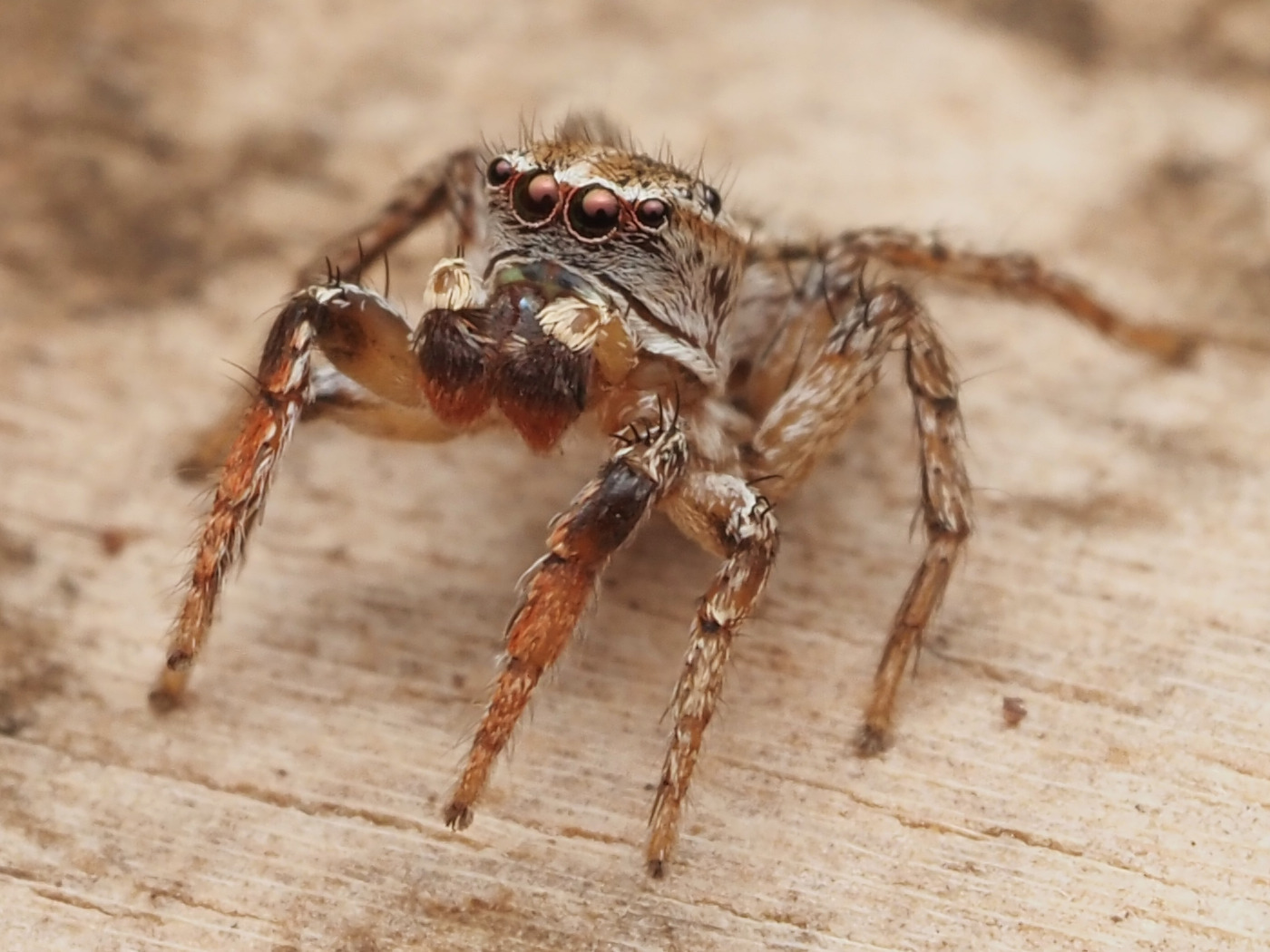
- Male

Scientific classification
- Kingdom: Animalia
- Phylum: Arthropoda
- Subphylum: Chelicerata
- Class: Arachnida
- Order: Araneae
- Infraorder: Araneomorphae
- Family: Salticidae
- Genus: Habronattus
- Species: H. texanus

Binomial name
- Habronattus texanus (Chamberlin, 1924)

= Habronattus texanus =

Species of spider

Habronattus texanus is a species of jumping spider in the family Salticidae. It is found in the United States and Mexico.

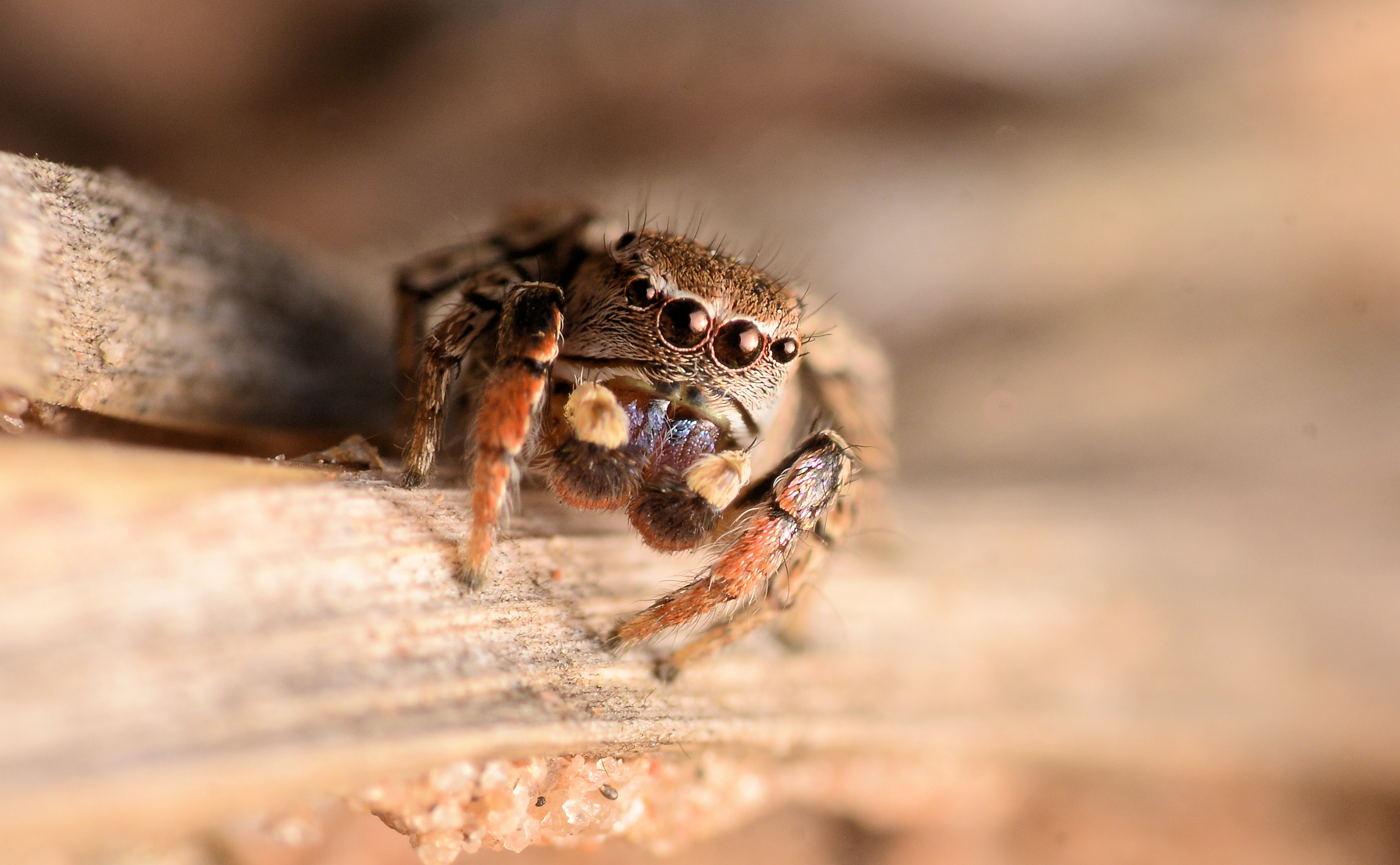
male face

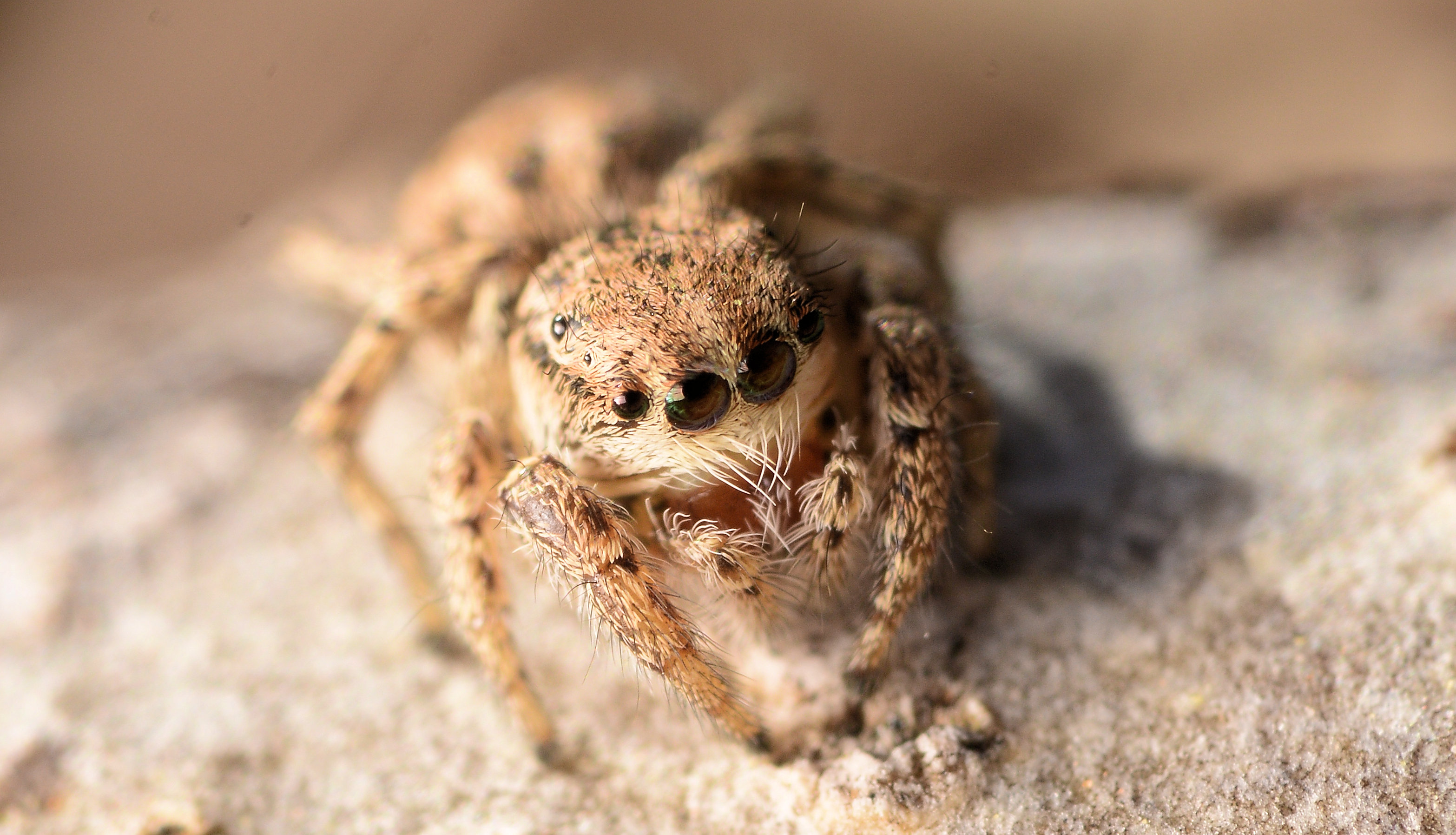
Female face

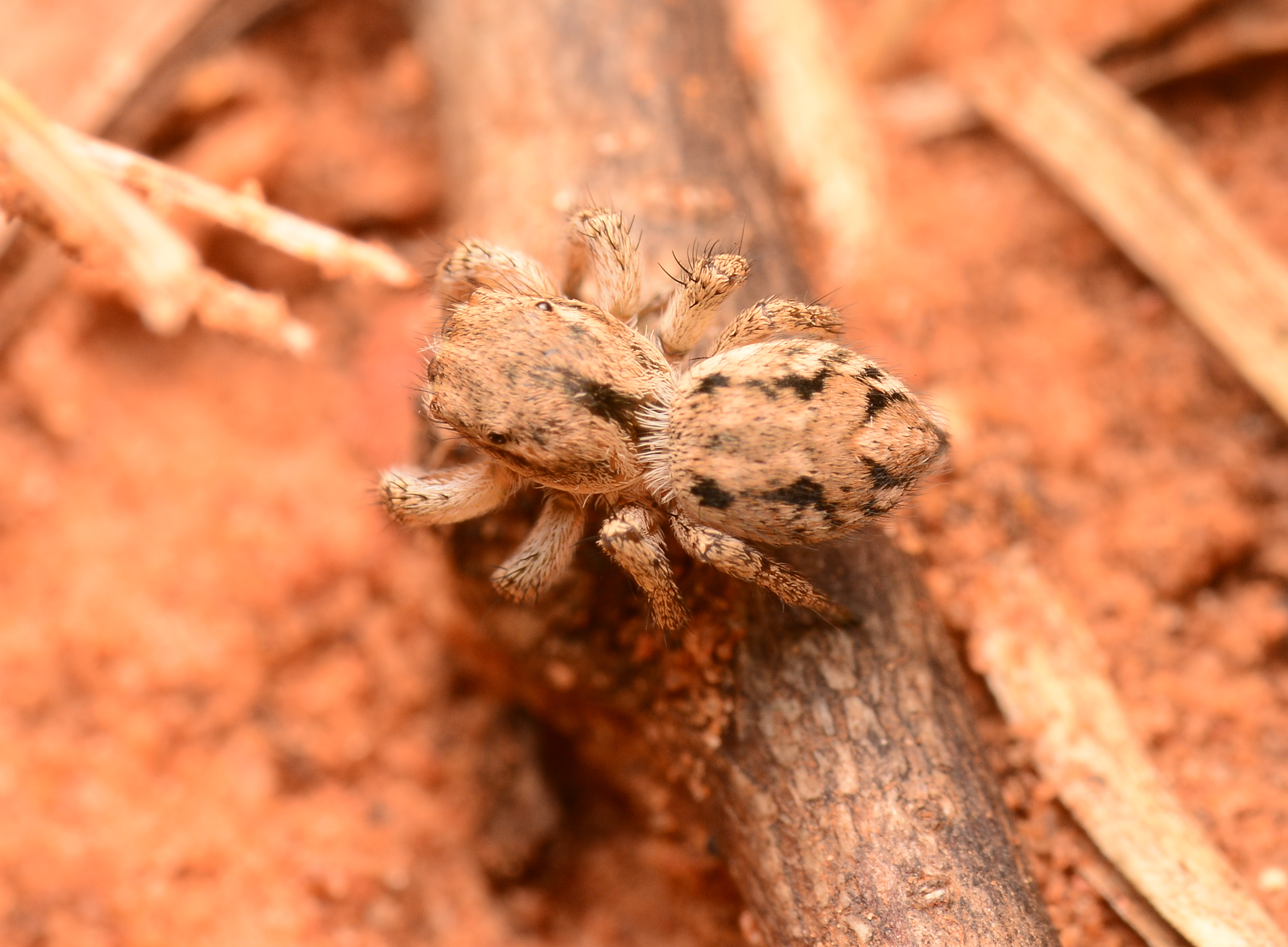
Female dorsal

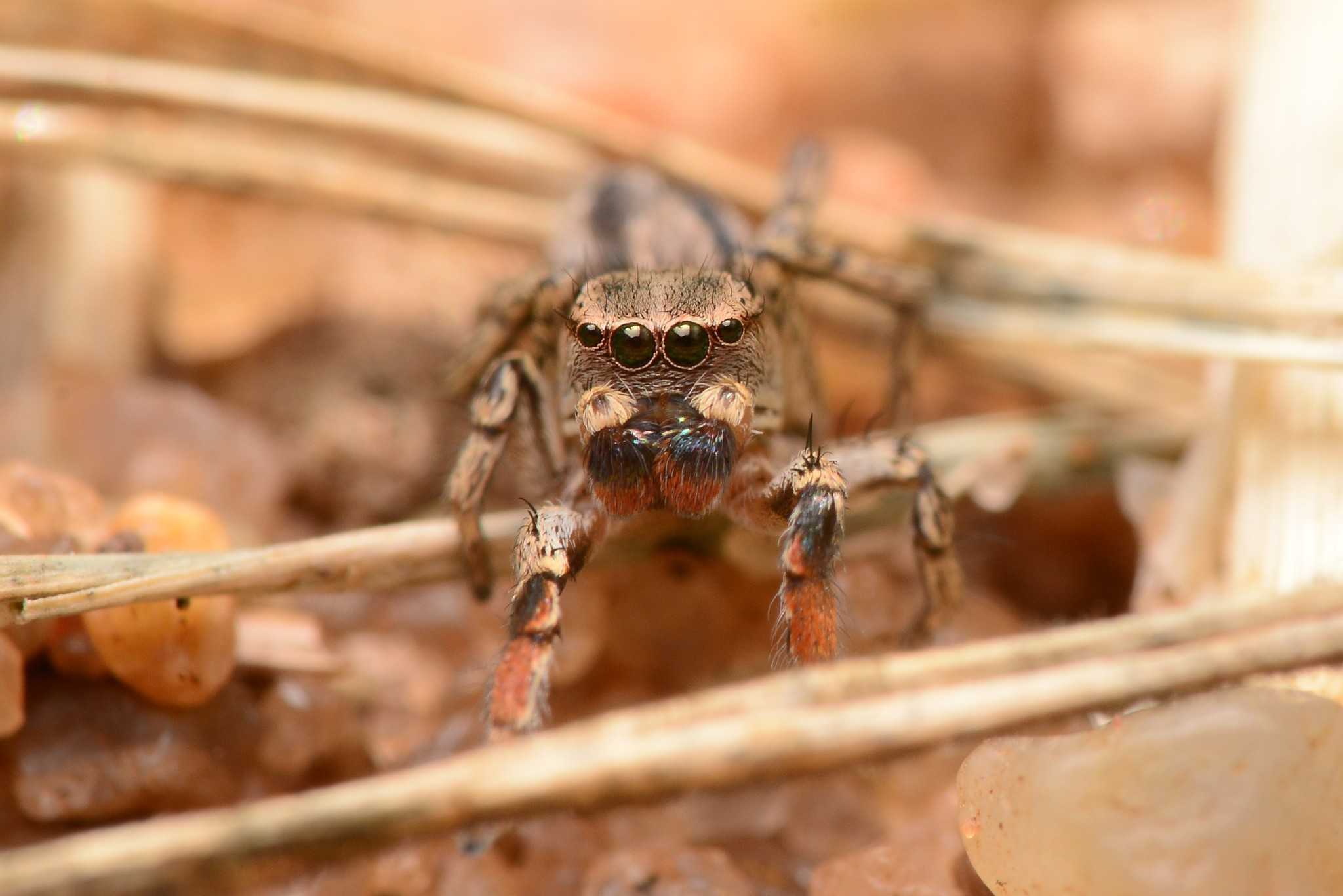
