= Habronattus californicus =

Scientific classification
- Kingdom: Animalia
- Phylum: Arthropoda
- Subphylum: Chelicerata
- Class: Arachnida
- Order: Araneae
- Infraorder: Araneomorphae
- Family: Salticidae
- Genus: Habronattus
- Species: H. californicus

Binomial name
- Habronattus californicus (Banks, 1904)

Species of spider

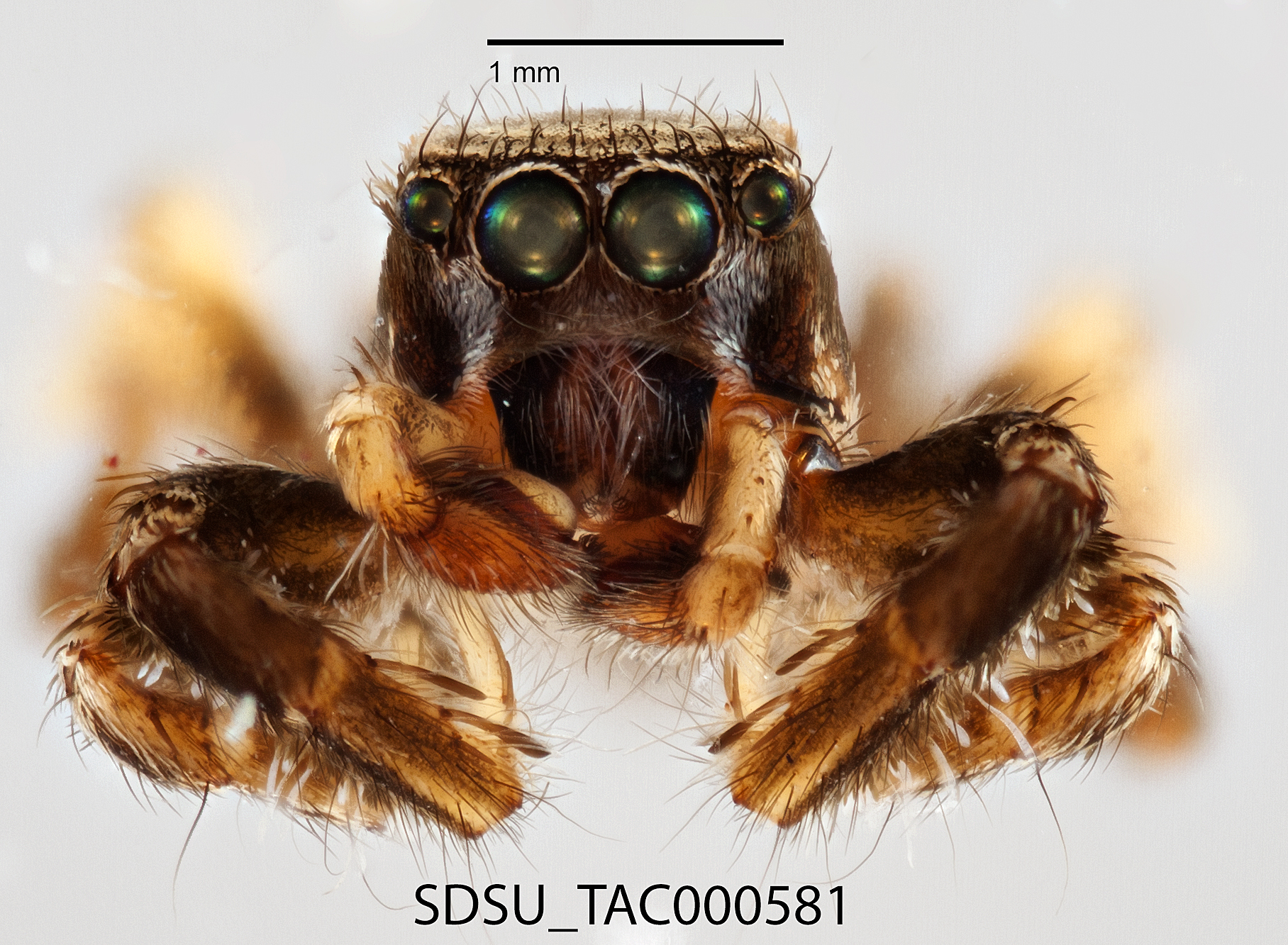
Habronattus californicus (Banks, 1904) (SDSU TAC000581) 001

Habronattus californicus is a species of jumping spider in the family Salticidae. It is found in California in the United States and along the Baja California Peninsula in Mexico.
