= Habronattus moratus =

Scientific classification
- Kingdom: Animalia
- Phylum: Arthropoda
- Subphylum: Chelicerata
- Class: Arachnida
- Order: Araneae
- Infraorder: Araneomorphae
- Family: Salticidae
- Genus: Habronattus
- Species: H. moratus

Binomial name
- Habronattus moratus (Gertsch & Mulaik, 1936)

Species of spider

Habronattus moratus is a species of jumping spider in the family Salticidae. It is found in Texas and northern Mexico.

First described in 1936 by Willis J. Gertsch and Stanley Mulaik, they are known for jumping on people and biting.
