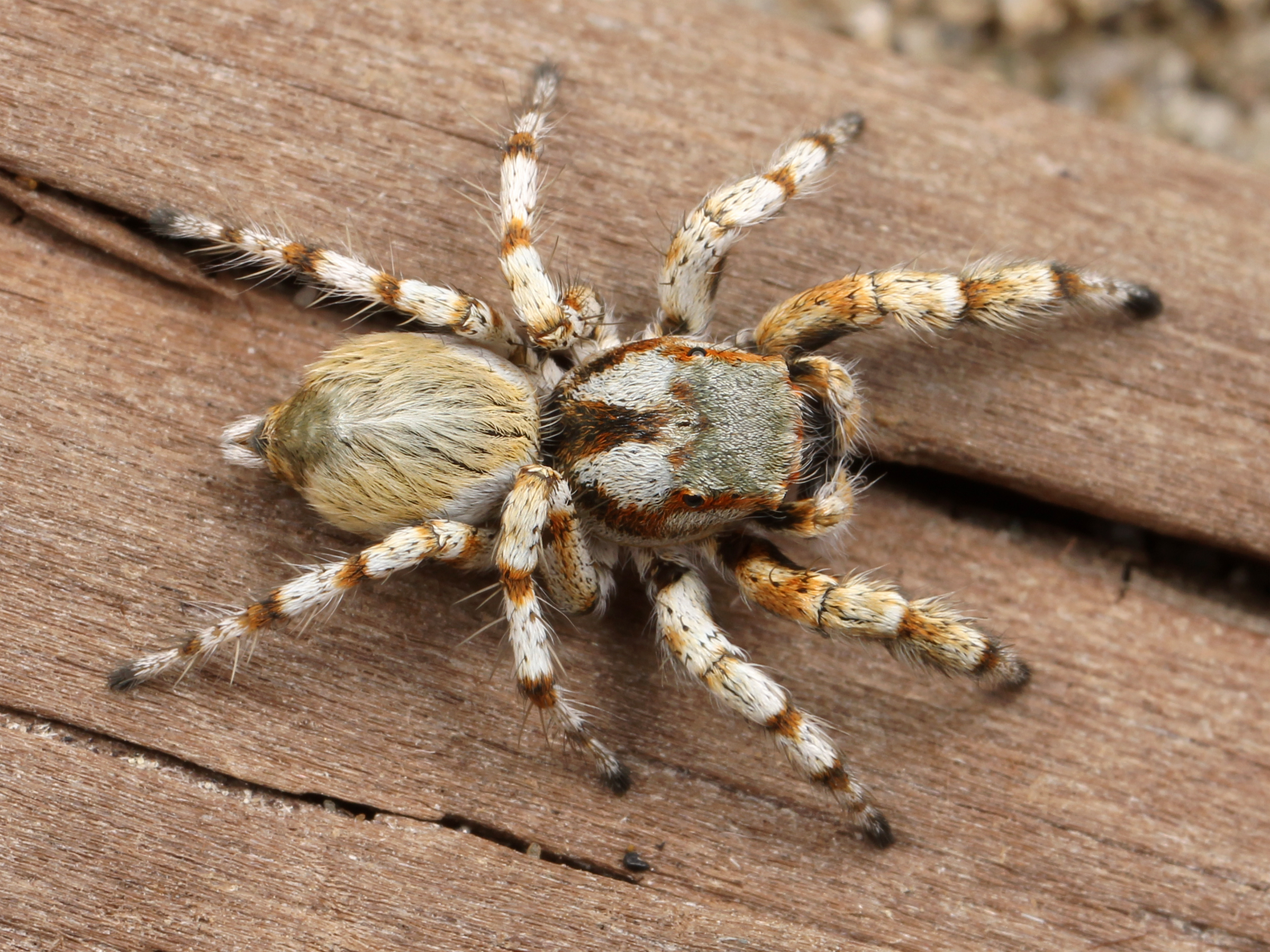
- Male from Marin County, California

Scientific classification
- Kingdom: Animalia
- Phylum: Arthropoda
- Subphylum: Chelicerata
- Class: Arachnida
- Order: Araneae
- Infraorder: Araneomorphae
- Family: Salticidae
- Genus: Habronattus
- Species: H. amicus

Binomial name
- Habronattus amicus (Peckham & Peckham, 1909)

= Habronattus amicus =

Species of spider

Habronattus amicus is a species of jumping spider. It is found in the western United States.
