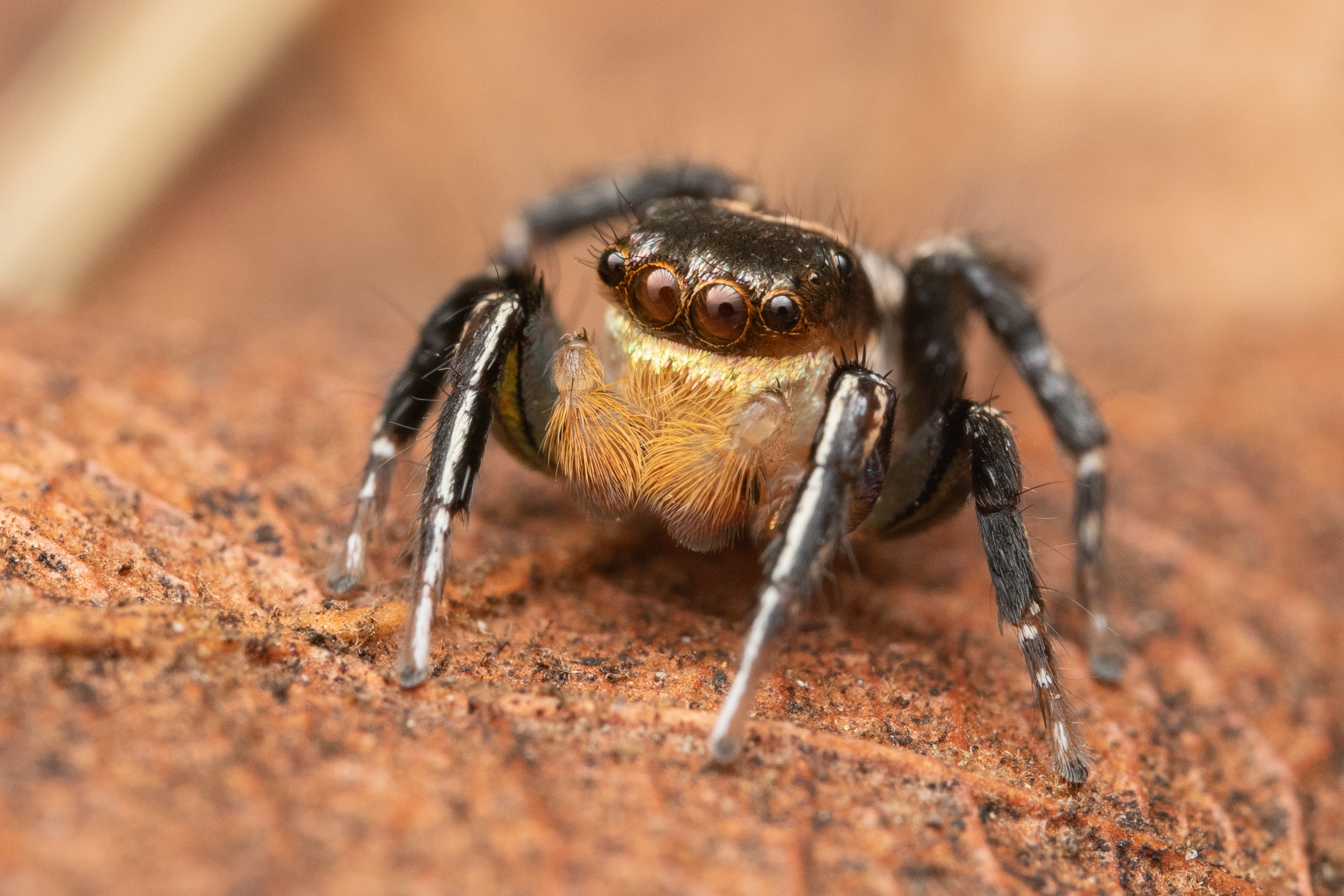
- Male

Scientific classification
- Kingdom: Animalia
- Phylum: Arthropoda
- Subphylum: Chelicerata
- Class: Arachnida
- Order: Araneae
- Infraorder: Araneomorphae
- Family: Salticidae
- Genus: Habronattus
- Species: H. hallani

Binomial name
- Habronattus hallani (Richman, 1973)

= Habronattus hallani =

Species of spider

Habronattus hallani is a species of jumping spider. It is found in the United States and Mexico.
