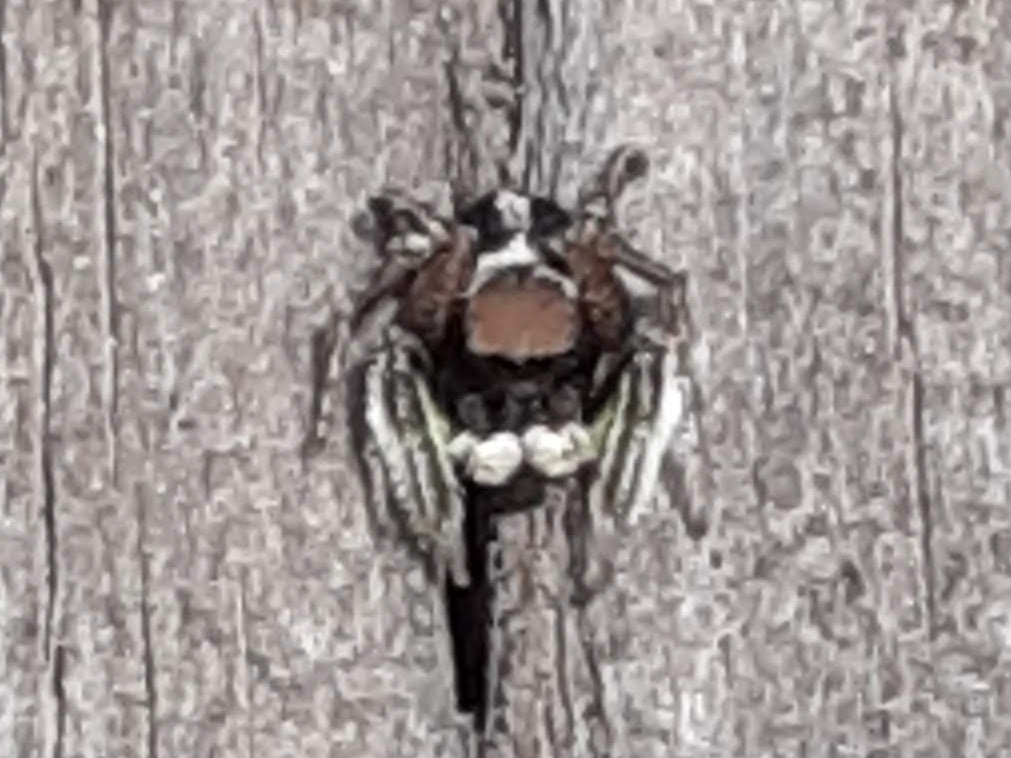

Scientific classification
- Kingdom: Animalia
- Phylum: Arthropoda
- Subphylum: Chelicerata
- Class: Arachnida
- Order: Araneae
- Infraorder: Araneomorphae
- Family: Salticidae
- Genus: Habronattus
- Species: H. jucundus

Binomial name
- Habronattus jucundus (Peckham & Peckham, 1909)

= Habronattus jucundus =

Species of spider

Habronattus jucundus is a species of spider in the family Salticidae, found in the U.S. and Canada.

The species are black coloured.
