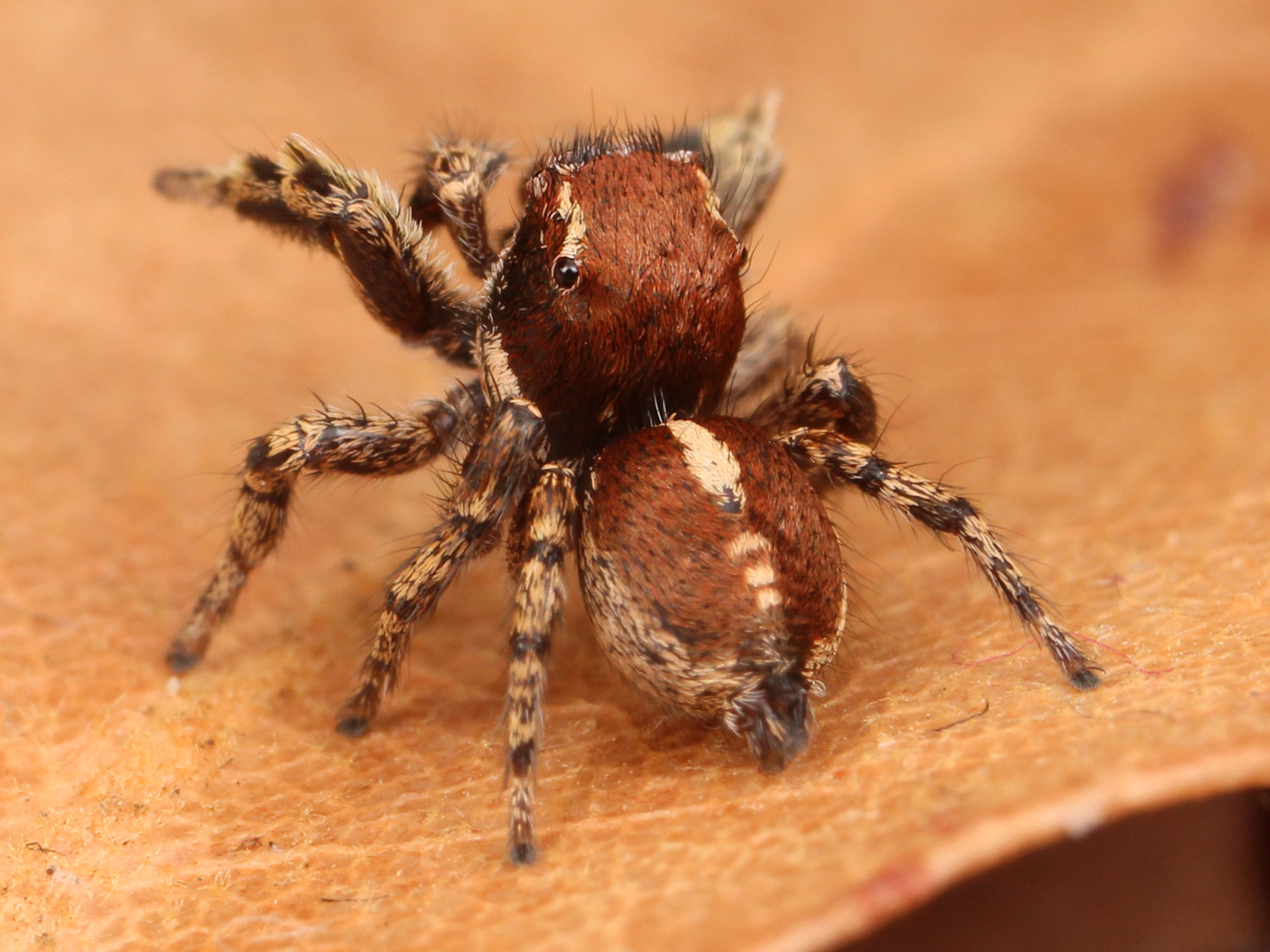

Scientific classification
- Kingdom: Animalia
- Phylum: Arthropoda
- Subphylum: Chelicerata
- Class: Arachnida
- Order: Araneae
- Infraorder: Araneomorphae
- Family: Salticidae
- Genus: Habronattus
- Species: H. peckhami

Binomial name
- Habronattus peckhami (Banks, 1921)

= Habronattus peckhami =

Species of spider

Habronattus peckhami is a species of spider in the family Salticidae. It is found in the USA.

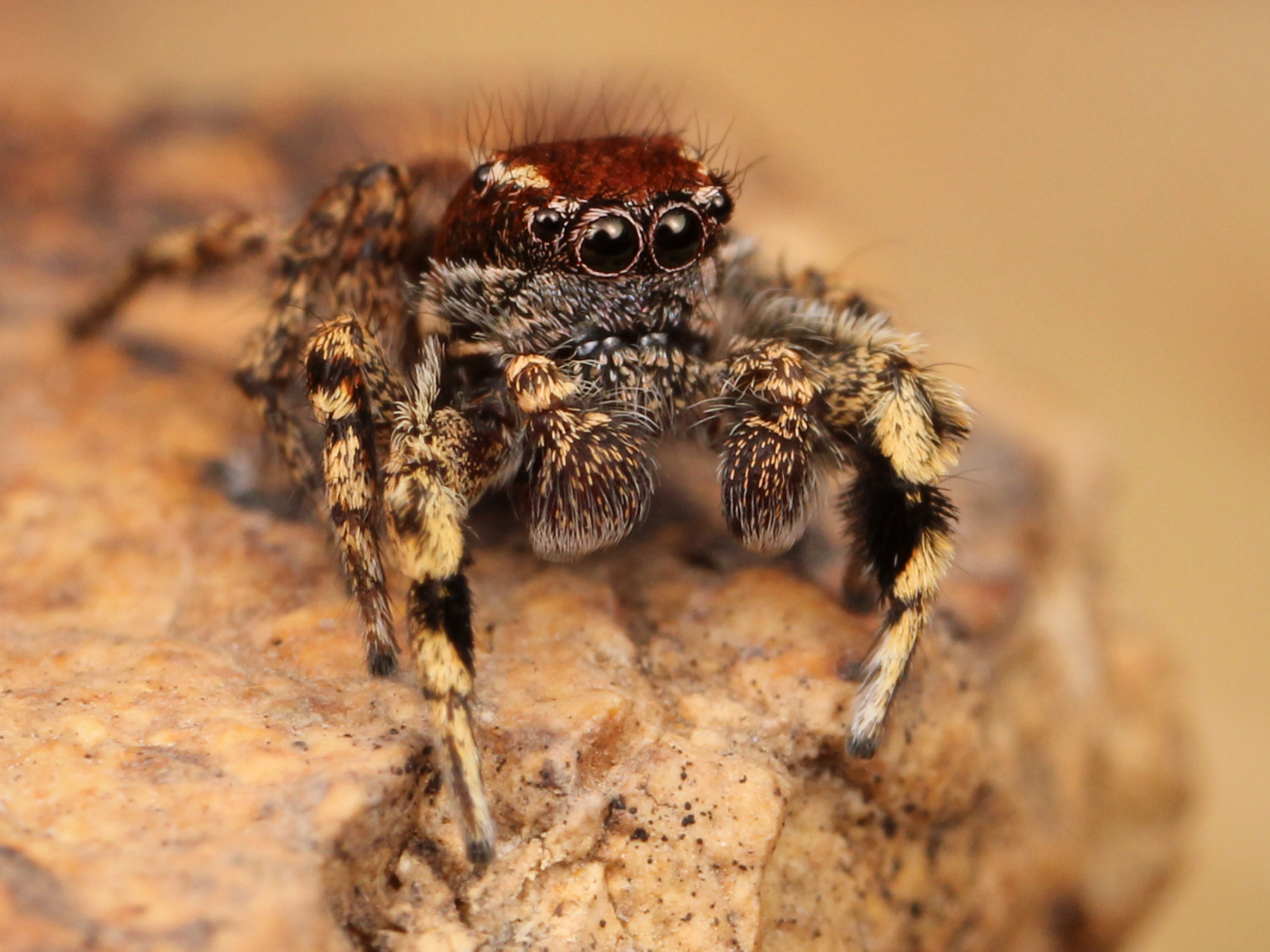
