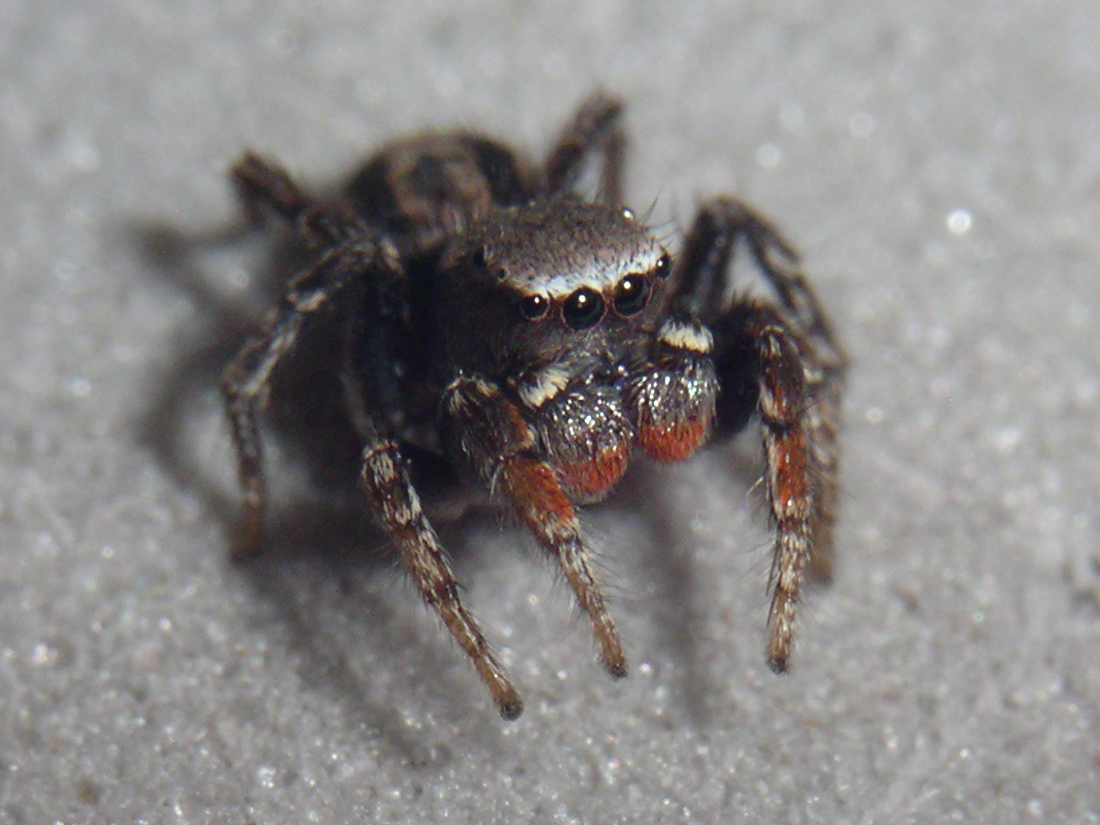
- Male in Alberta, Canada

Scientific classification
- Kingdom: Animalia
- Phylum: Arthropoda
- Subphylum: Chelicerata
- Class: Arachnida
- Order: Araneae
- Infraorder: Araneomorphae
- Family: Salticidae
- Genus: Habronattus
- Species: H. altanus

Binomial name
- Habronattus altanus (Gertsch, 1934)

= Habronattus altanus =

Species of spider

Habronattus altanus is a species of jumping spider in the family Salticidae. It is found in Canada, the United States, and Mexico.
