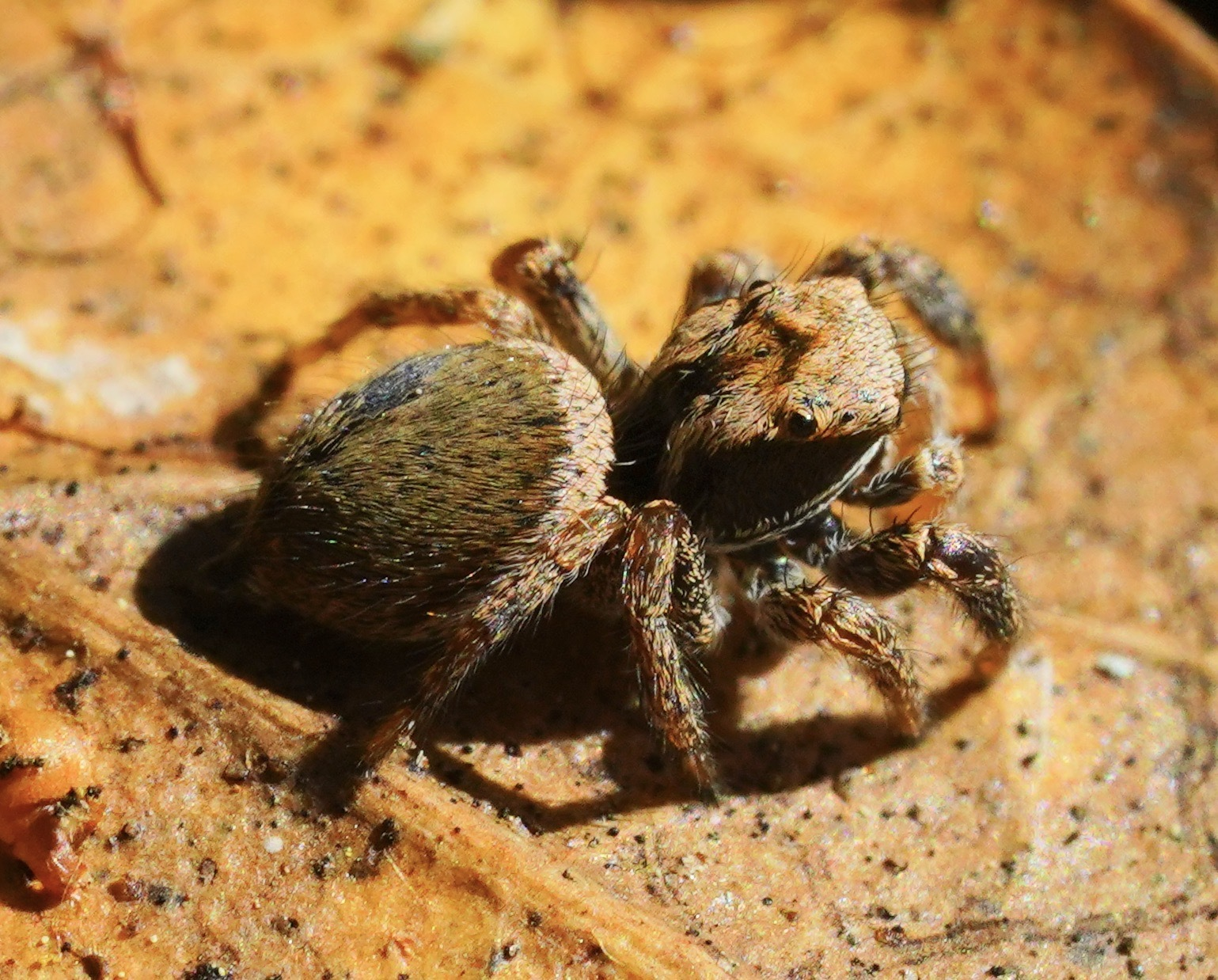

Scientific classification
- Kingdom: Animalia
- Phylum: Arthropoda
- Subphylum: Chelicerata
- Class: Arachnida
- Order: Araneae
- Infraorder: Araneomorphae
- Family: Salticidae
- Genus: Habronattus
- Species: H. oregonensis

Binomial name
- Habronattus oregonensis (Peckham & Peckham, 1888)

= Habronattus oregonensis =

Species of spider

Habronattus oregonensis is a species of jumping spider in the family Salticidae. It is found in North America.
