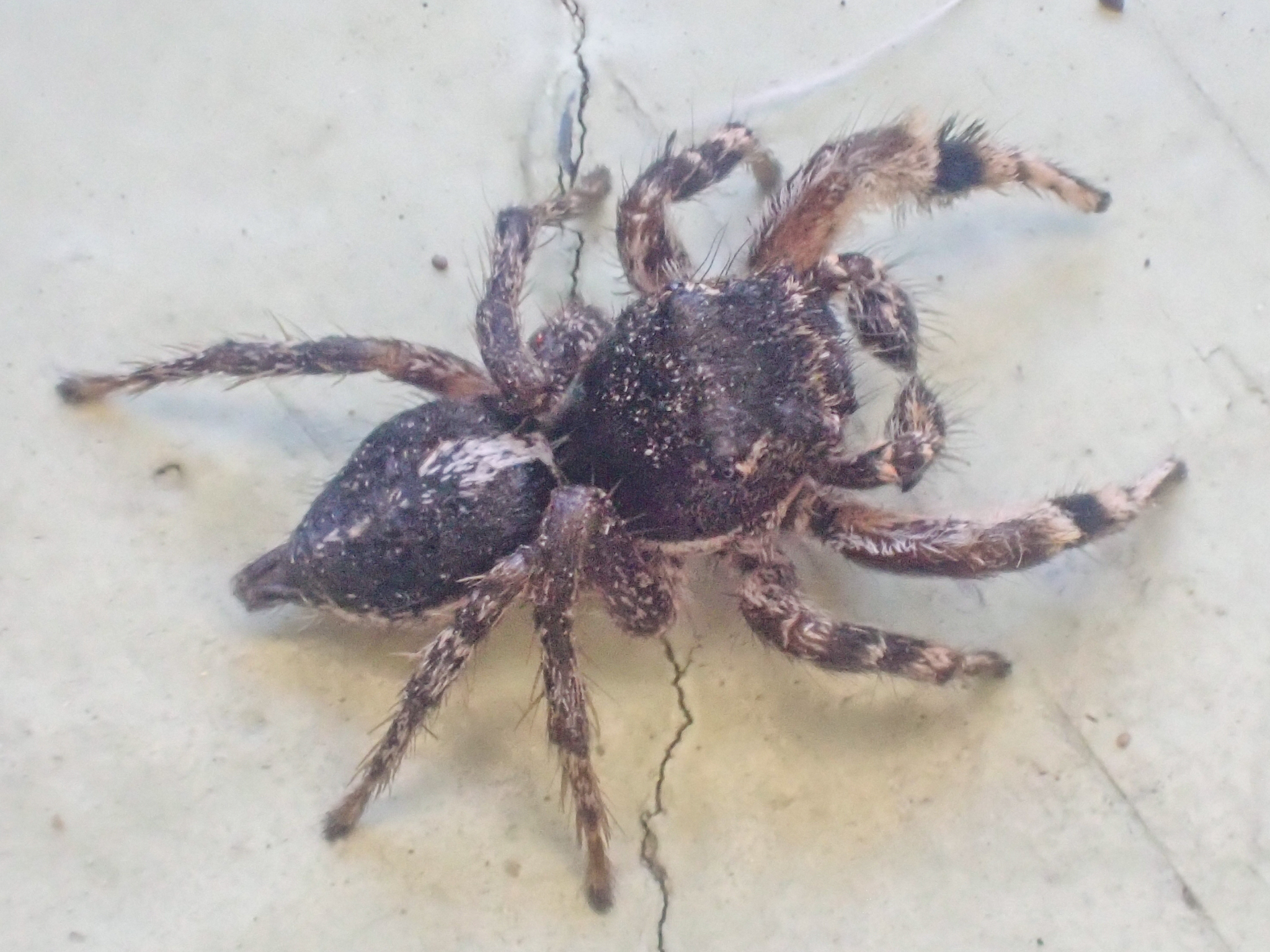

Scientific classification
- Kingdom: Animalia
- Phylum: Arthropoda
- Subphylum: Chelicerata
- Class: Arachnida
- Order: Araneae
- Infraorder: Araneomorphae
- Family: Salticidae
- Genus: Habronattus
- Species: H. elegans

Binomial name
- Habronattus elegans (Peckham & Peckham, 1901)

Synonyms
- List: Pellenes elegans Peckham & Peckham, 1901; Pellenes elegans Peckham & Peckham, 1909; Habronattus elegans Prószyński, 1976; Habronattus elegans Griswold, 1987; Habronattus elegans Prószyński, 2017

= Habronattus elegans =

Species of spider

Habronattus elegans is a species of spider in the jumping spider family, Salticidae. It is found in the United States and in Mexico.
