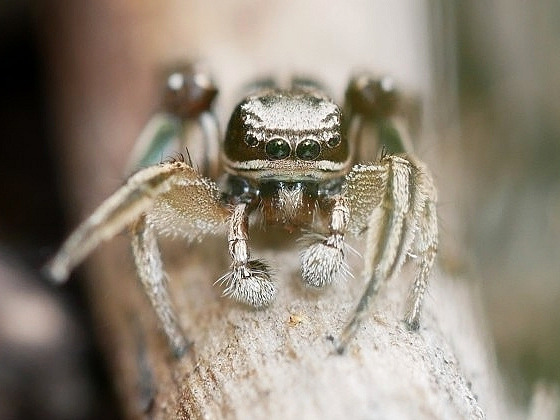
- Male Habronattus festus in Utah

Scientific classification
- Kingdom: Animalia
- Phylum: Arthropoda
- Subphylum: Chelicerata
- Class: Arachnida
- Order: Araneae
- Infraorder: Araneomorphae
- Family: Salticidae
- Genus: Habronattus
- Species: H. festus

Binomial name
- Habronattus festus (Peckham & Peckham, 1901)

= Habronattus festus =

Species of spider

Habronattus festus is a species of jumping spider. It is found in the western United States.
