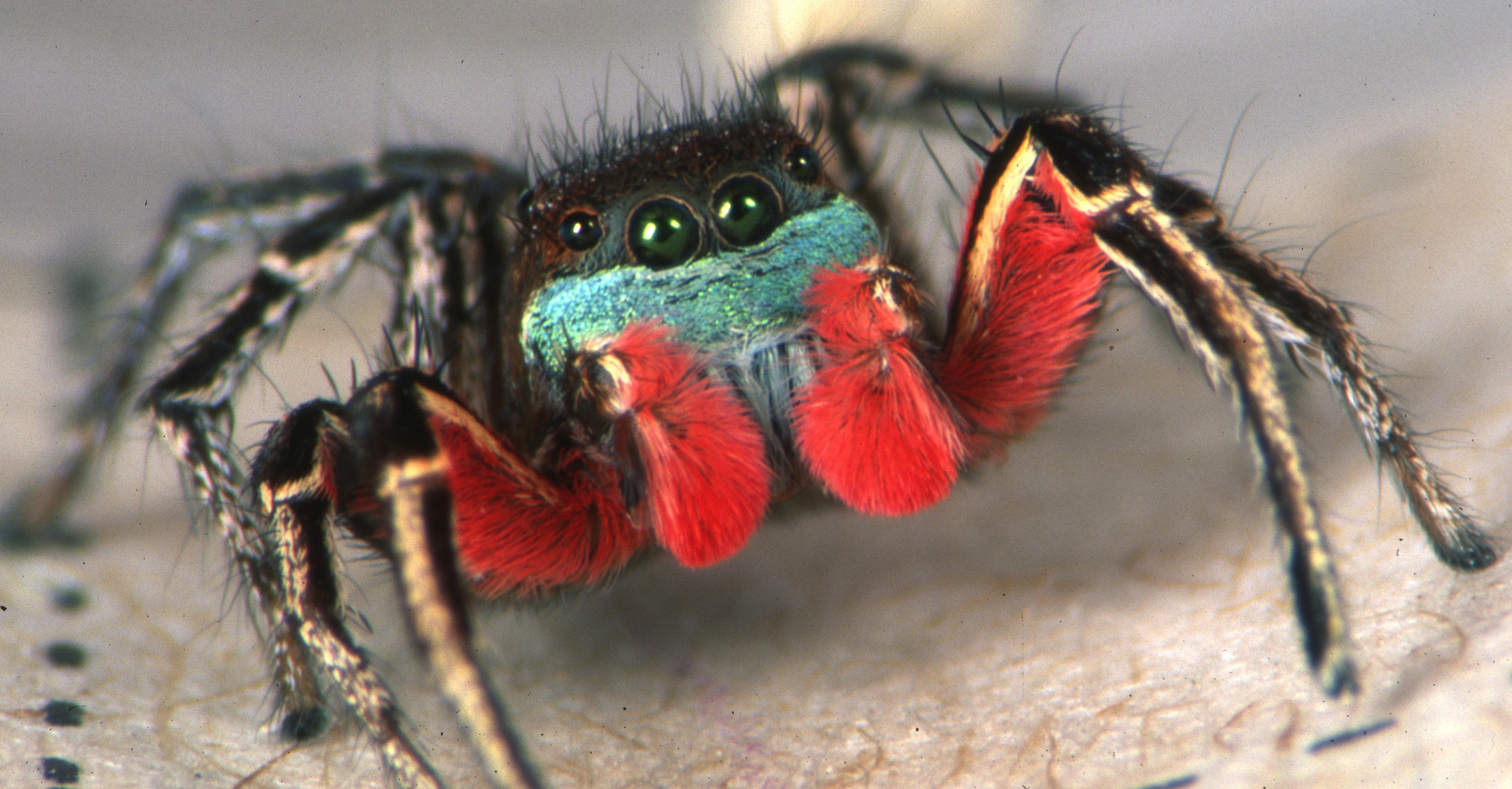

Scientific classification
- Kingdom: Animalia
- Phylum: Arthropoda
- Subphylum: Chelicerata
- Class: Arachnida
- Order: Araneae
- Infraorder: Araneomorphae
- Family: Salticidae
- Genus: Habronattus
- Species: H. americanus

Binomial name
- Habronattus americanus (Keyserling, 1885)

= Habronattus americanus =

Species of spider

Habronattus americanus is a species of jumping spiders from the family Salticidae.

== Description ==
The female spider is brown and gray, with a small color range. The male spider is black colored from top, and the male's pedipalp is red, along with parts of the legs. The red color is used to attract female mates with courtship displays.

== Habitat ==
This species lives in western North America, ranging from British Columbia, Canada, in the north to California, United States, in the south. It ranges from the coast into Alberta and Montana. It may reach further, but current knowledge is based only on reported sightings.
