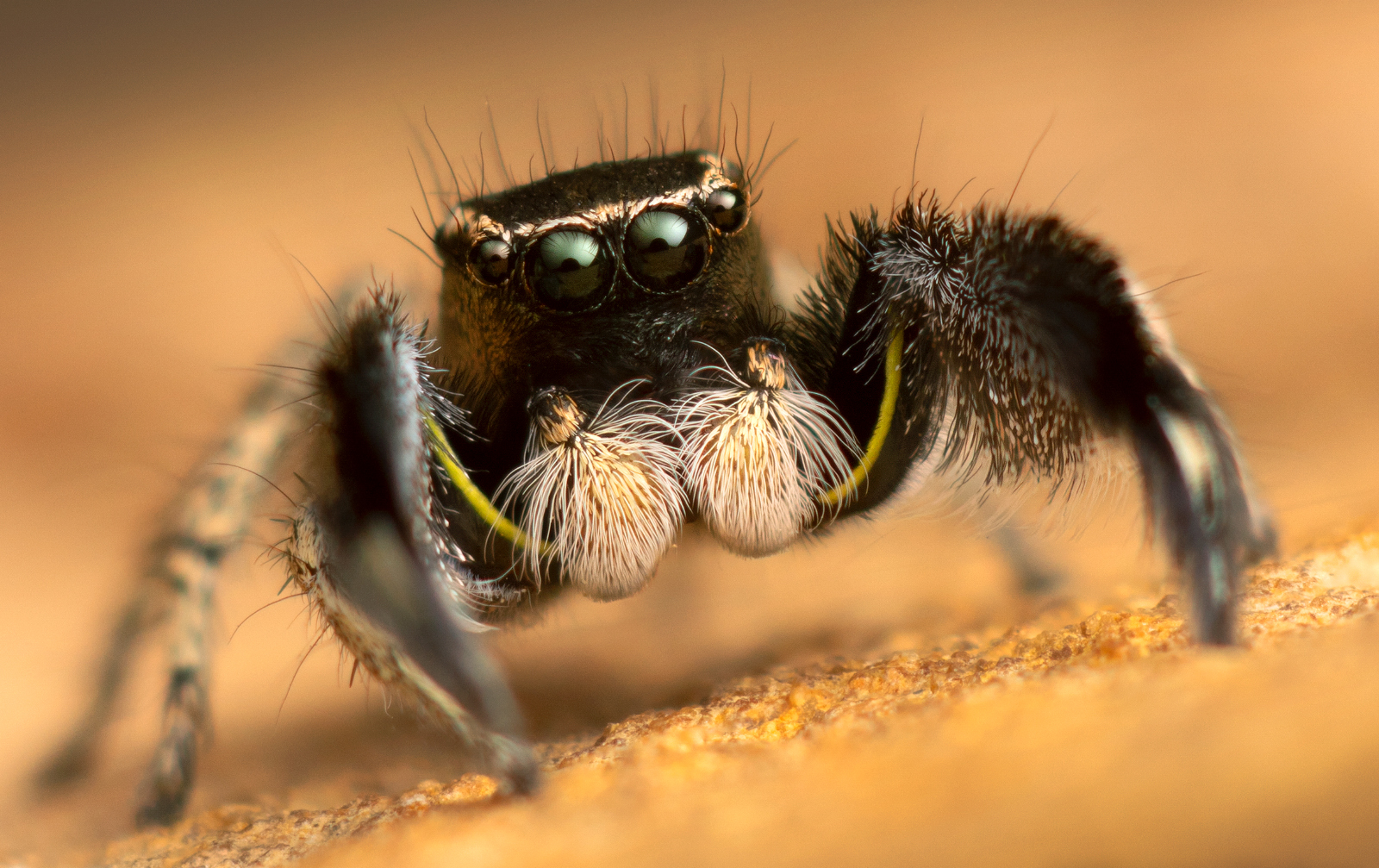
- Male in California

Scientific classification
- Kingdom: Animalia
- Phylum: Arthropoda
- Subphylum: Chelicerata
- Class: Arachnida
- Order: Araneae
- Infraorder: Araneomorphae
- Family: Salticidae
- Genus: Habronattus
- Species: H. hirsutus

Binomial name
- Habronattus hirsutus (Peckham & Peckham, 1888)

= Habronattus hirsutus =

Species of spider

Habronattus hirsutus is a species of jumping spider (family Salticidae). It is found in North America.
