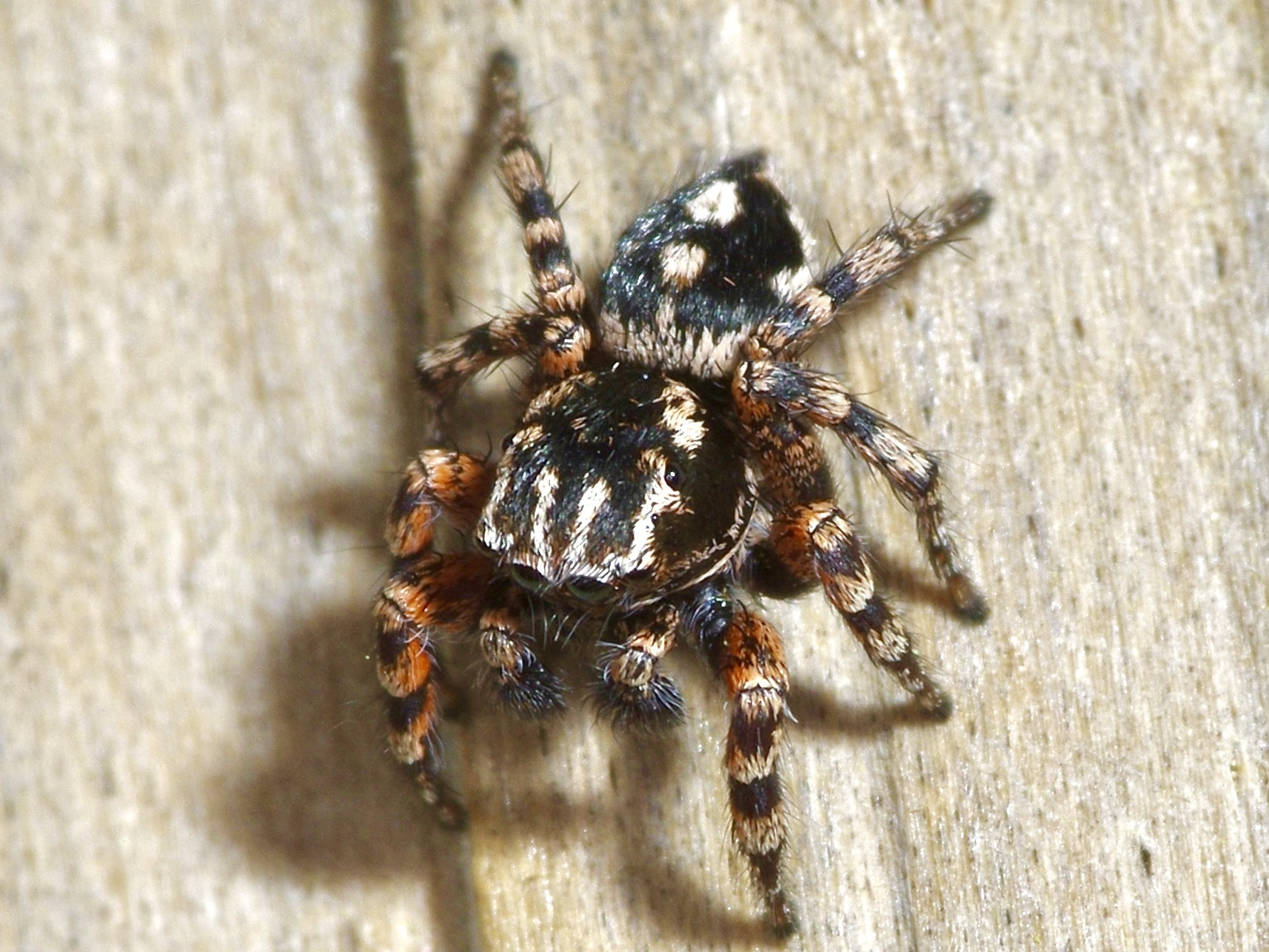

Scientific classification
- Kingdom: Animalia
- Phylum: Arthropoda
- Subphylum: Chelicerata
- Class: Arachnida
- Order: Araneae
- Infraorder: Araneomorphae
- Family: Salticidae
- Genus: Habronattus
- Species: H. fallax

Binomial name
- Habronattus fallax (Peckham & Peckham, 1909)

= Habronattus fallax =

Species of spider

Habronattus fallax is a species of spider in the family Salticidae found in the United States and Mexico.

== Description ==
The species are brownish-black, and have a size of 1/8 of an inch. The females have markings, which includes a stripe, on their lower abdomen, while the males have two spots instead, with white stripes that are located on the front of the cephalothorax.

== Ecology ==
The species feed on leaf beetles and other insects.
