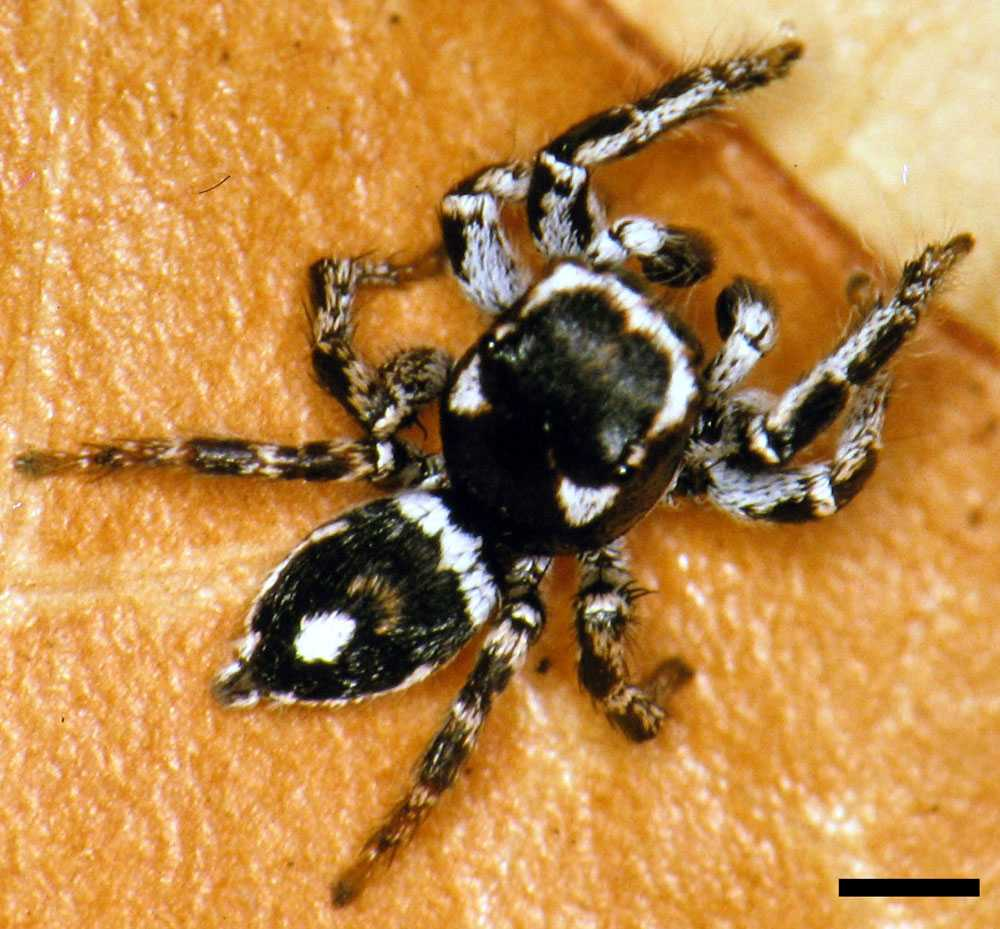

Scientific classification
- Kingdom: Animalia
- Phylum: Arthropoda
- Subphylum: Chelicerata
- Class: Arachnida
- Order: Araneae
- Infraorder: Araneomorphae
- Family: Salticidae
- Genus: Habronattus
- Species: H. carolinensis

Binomial name
- Habronattus carolinensis (Peckham & Peckham, 1901)

= Habronattus carolinensis =

Species of spider

Habronattus carolinensis is a species of jumping spider in the family Salticidae. It is found in the United States and Canada?.

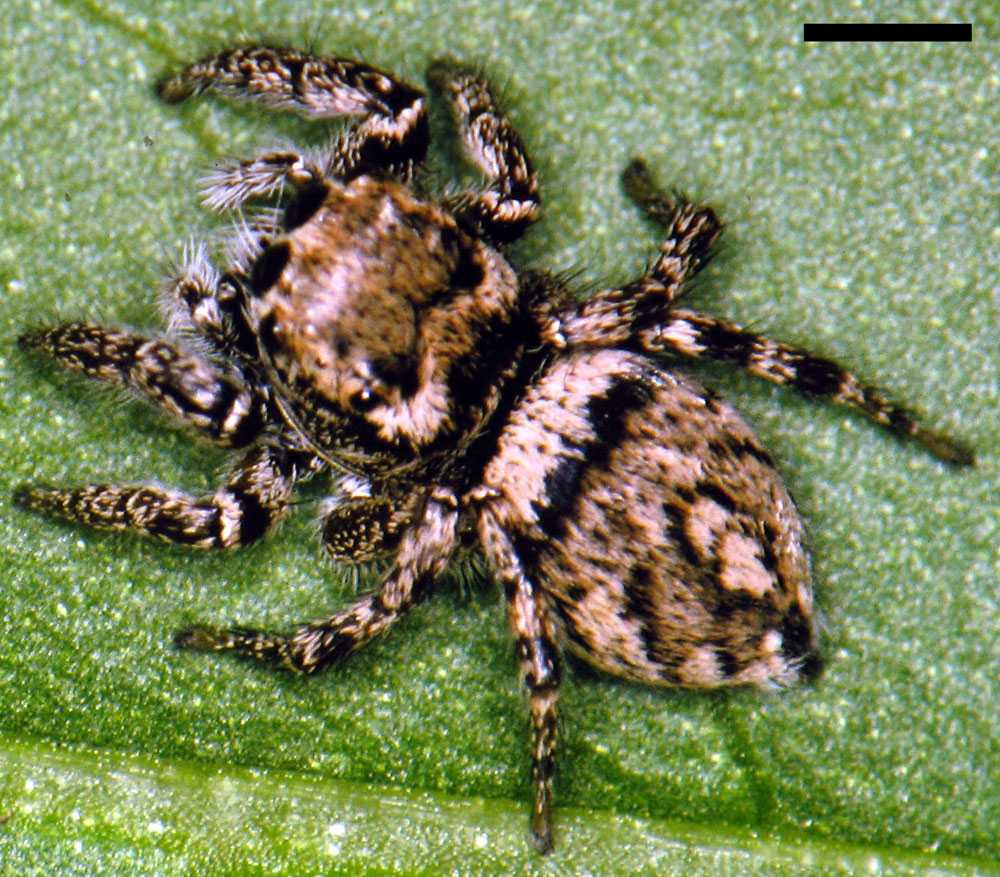
