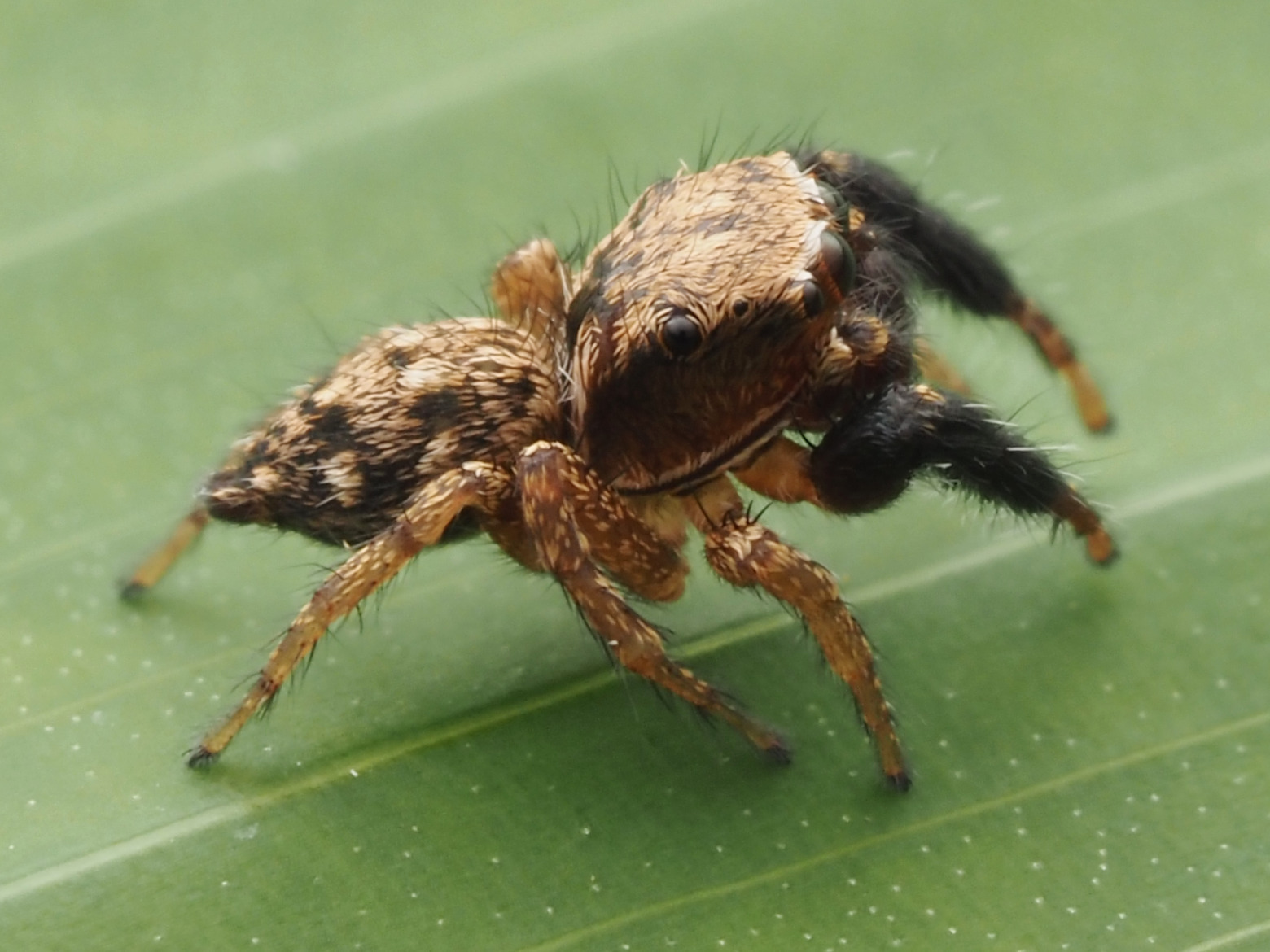
- Male
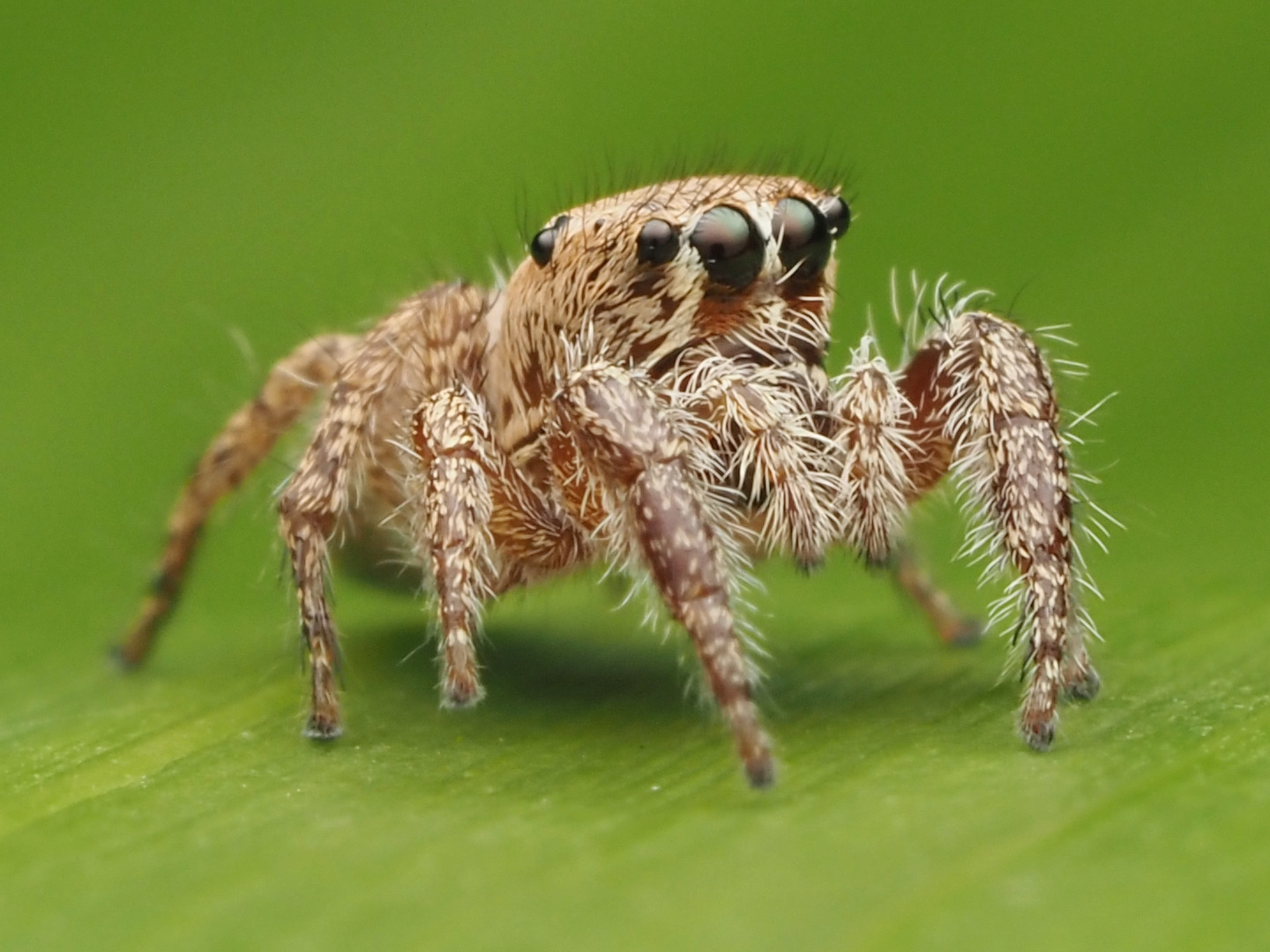
- Female

Scientific classification
- Kingdom: Animalia
- Phylum: Arthropoda
- Subphylum: Chelicerata
- Class: Arachnida
- Order: Araneae
- Infraorder: Araneomorphae
- Family: Salticidae
- Genus: Habronattus
- Species: H. paratus

Binomial name
- Habronattus paratus (Peckham & Peckham, 1896)

= Habronattus paratus =

Species of spider

Habronattus paratus is a species of jumping spider. It is found in Central America and Paraguay.
