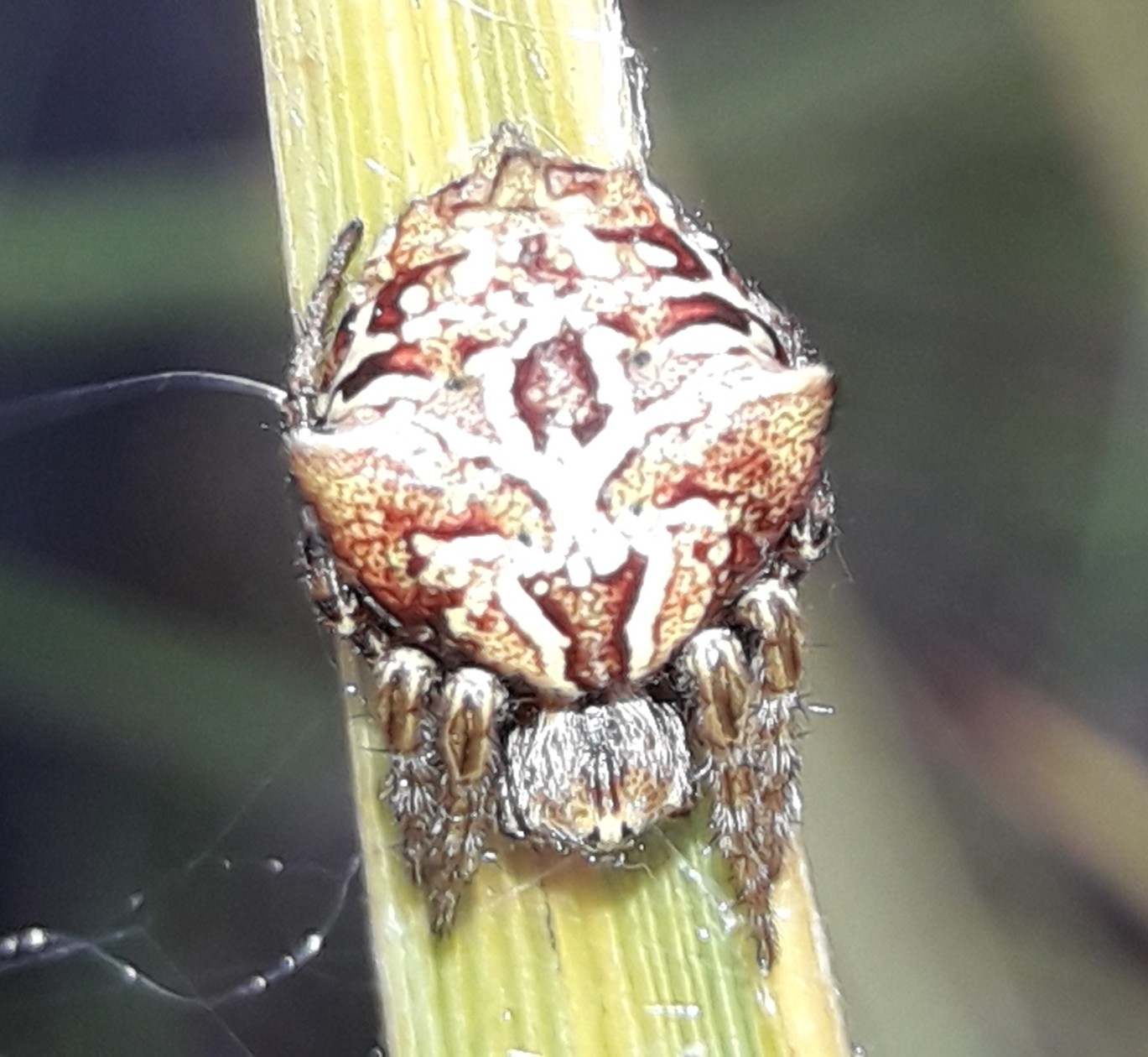

Conservation status
- Not Threatened (NZ TCS)

Scientific classification
- Domain: Eukaryota
- Kingdom: Animalia
- Phylum: Arthropoda
- Subphylum: Chelicerata
- Class: Arachnida
- Order: Araneae
- Infraorder: Araneomorphae
- Family: Araneidae
- Genus: Acroaspis
- Species: A. decorosa

Binomial name
- Acroaspis decorosa (Urquhart, 1894)

= Acroaspis decorosa =

Species of spider

Acroaspis decorosa is a species of orbweaver spider that is endemic to New Zealand.

== Taxonomy ==
Acroaspis decorsa was first described in 1894 as Epeira decorosa by Arthur Urquhart. This species was later moved to the Eriophora genus by Ray Forster in 1988. The species was moved again in 2010 to the Acroaspis genus. The holotype is stored in Canterbury Museum.

== Description ==
The male is recorded at 5mm in length whereas the female is 8.5mm.

== Distribution ==
This species is endemic to New Zealand.

== Conservation status ==
Under the New Zealand Threat Classification System, this species is listed as "Not Threatened" with the qualifier of "Secure Overseas".
