= Spinneret =

External body part of a spider

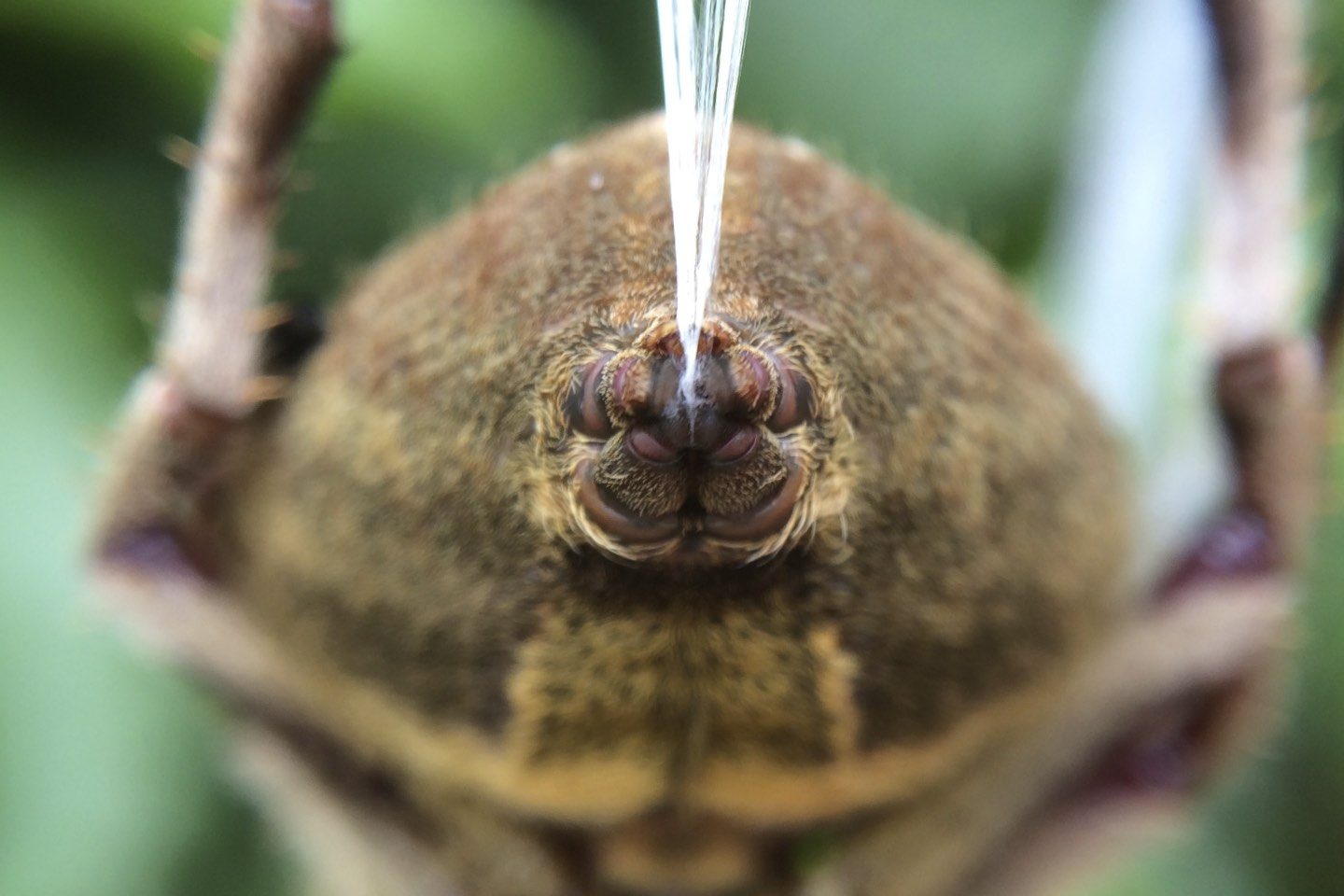
The spinnerets of an Australian garden orb weaver spider.

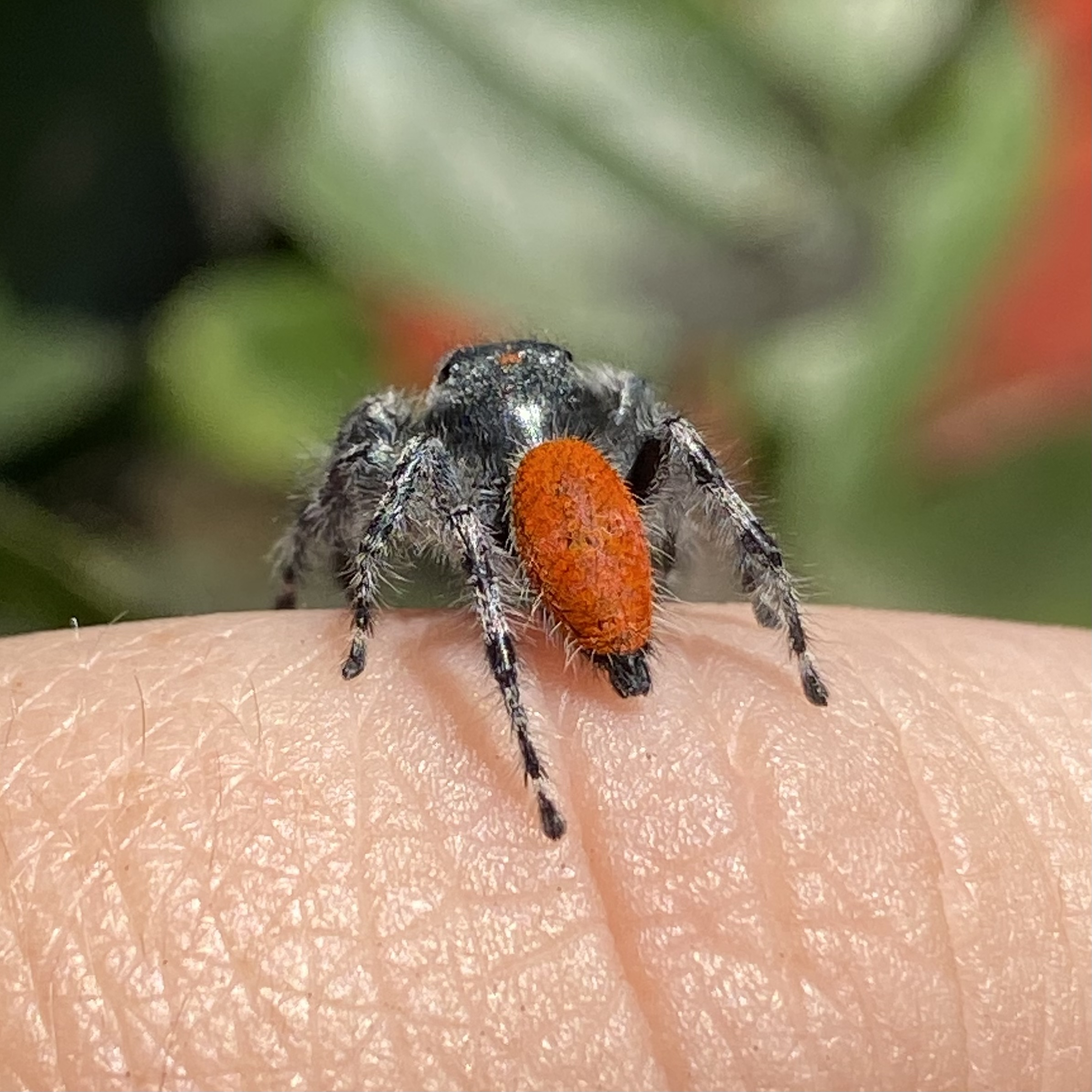
Black spinneret of Phidippus adumbratus visible below red abdomen

A spinneret is a silk-spinning organ of a spider or the larva of an insect. Some adult insects also have spinnerets, such as those borne on the forelegs of Embioptera. Spinnerets are usually on the underside of a spider's opisthosoma, and are typically segmented. While most spiders have six spinnerets, some have two, four, or eight. They can move both independently and in concert.

Most spinnerets are not simple structures with a single orifice producing a single thread, but complex structures of many microscopic spigots, each producing one filament. This produces the necessary orientation of the protein molecules, without which the silk would be weak and useless. Spigots can be singular or found in groups, which also permits spiders to combine multiple filaments in different ways to produce many kinds of silk for various purposes. Spinneret morphology can help arachnologists identify the taxon of a specimen and the specific morphology of a spigot can determine its use as well. For example, flagelliform spigot is unique to Araneoidea, and another kind of spigot found in sets of three, referred to as cylindrical gland spots, are found only in females and used for making egg sacs. The desert grass spider, Agelenopsis aperta, has especially prominent spinnerets that extend out of the end of their abdomen.

Various species of spiders use silk extruded from spinnerets to build webs, to transfer sperm, to entrap insects by wrapping it around them, to make egg-cases, to manipulate static electricity in the air, and to fly (ballooning), etc.

Some insect larvae (including silkworms) extrude silk to make a protective cocoon for their metamorphosis. The insects known as web spinners weave silken galleries for protection from predators and the elements while foraging and breeding.

== Evolution ==
Observations suggesting that there might be silk-producing organs on the feet of the zebra tarantula (Aphonopelma seemanni) led to questions about the origins of spinnerets. It was hypothesised that spinnerets in spiders were originally used as climbing aids on the feet and evolved and were used for webmaking at a later time.

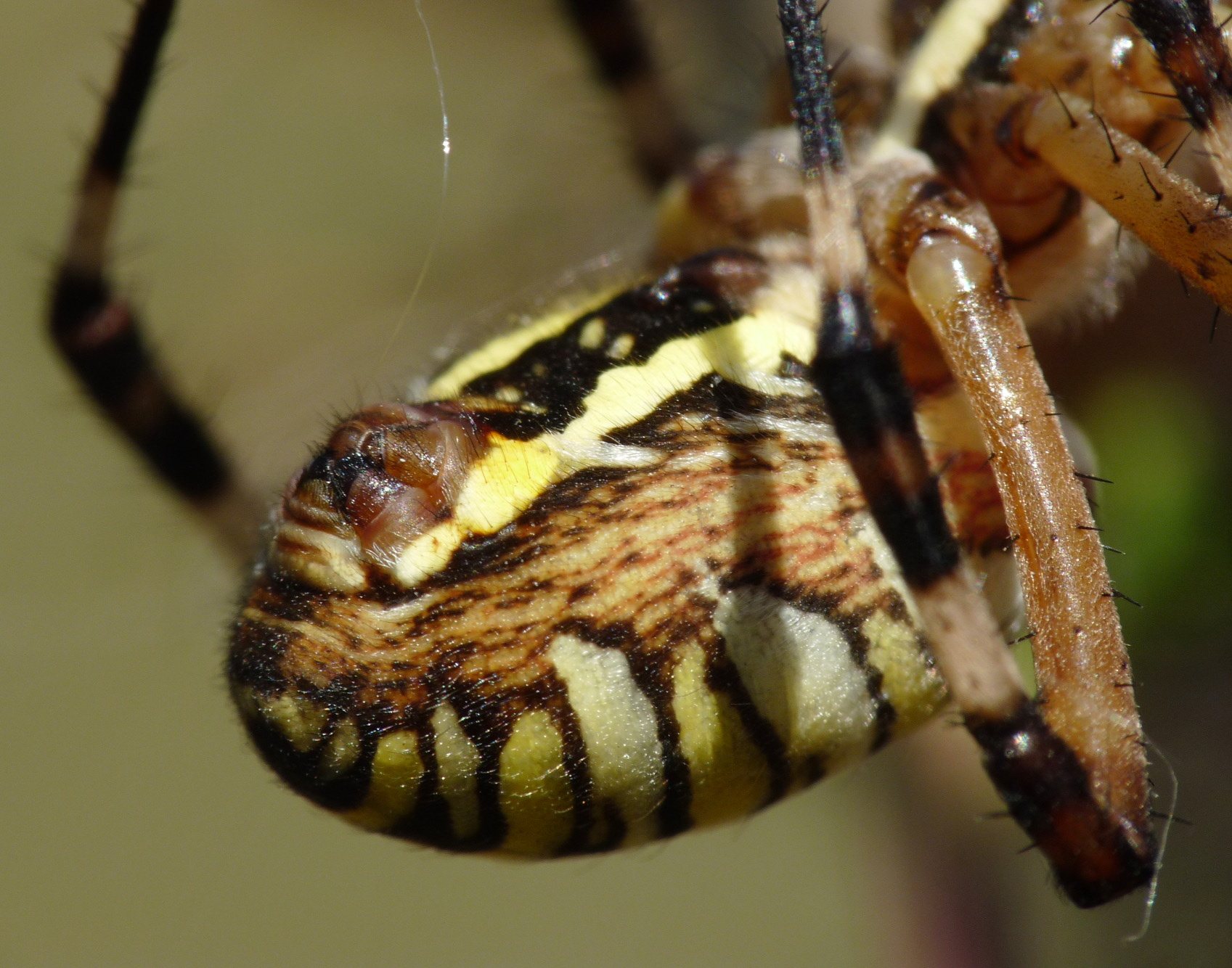
The compact spinnerets of Argiope bruennichi; placed ventrally below the posterior.

A barn spider encases her prey in silk emanating from her spinneret seen in the foreground.

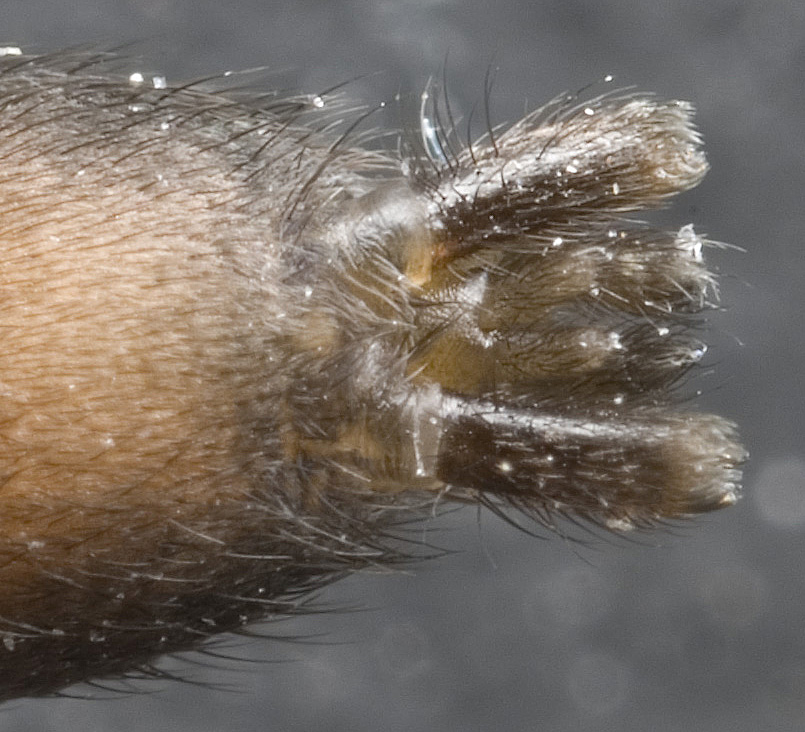
Ventral aspect of spinnerets of spider species with unusually long spinnerets.
