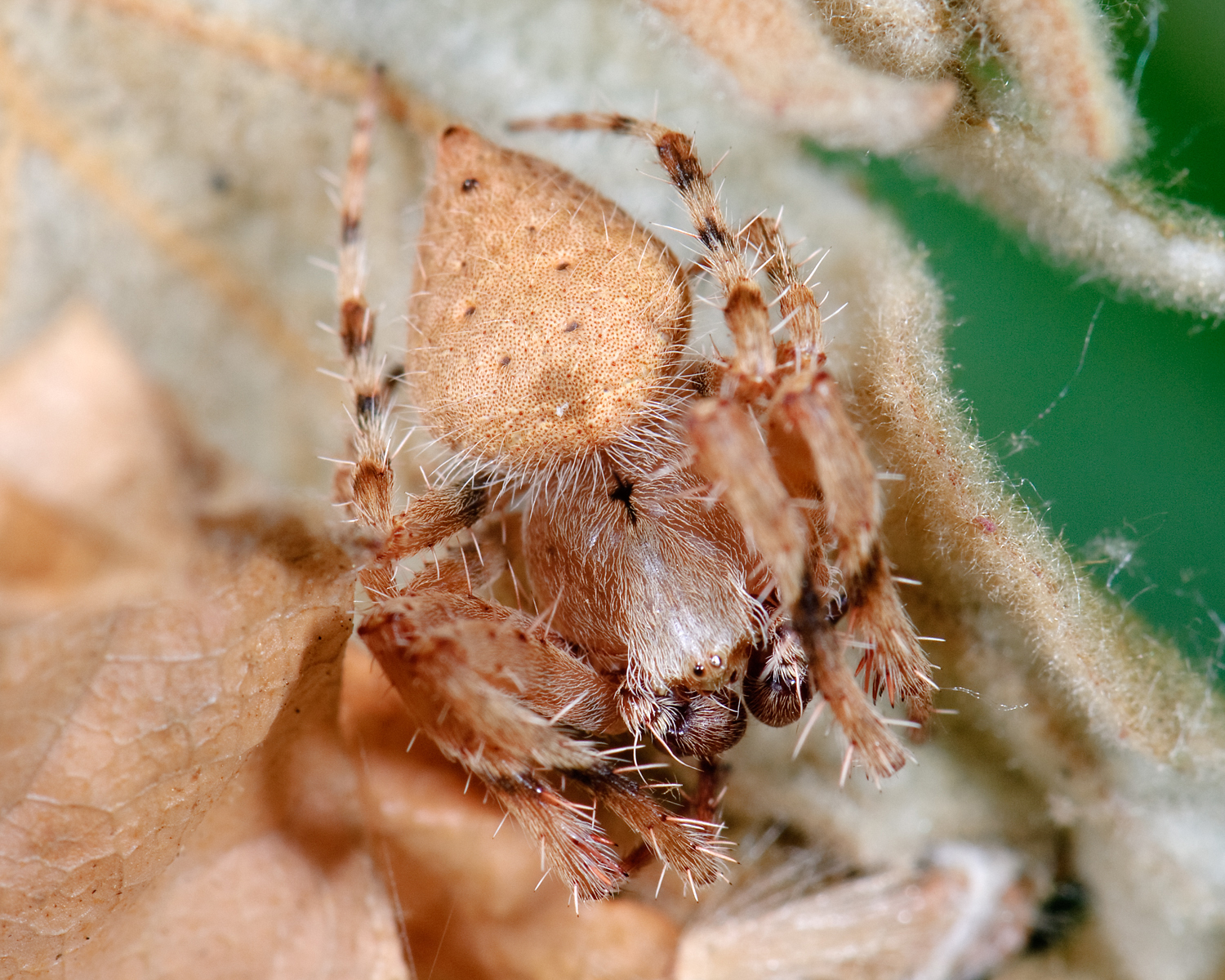

Scientific classification
- Domain: Eukaryota
- Kingdom: Animalia
- Phylum: Arthropoda
- Subphylum: Chelicerata
- Class: Arachnida
- Order: Araneae
- Infraorder: Araneomorphae
- Family: Araneidae
- Genus: Eriophora
- Species: E. edax

Binomial name
- Eriophora edax (Blackwall, 1863)

= Eriophora edax =

Species of spider

Eriophora edax is a species of orb weaver in the spider family Araneidae. It is found in a range from the United States to Brazil.
