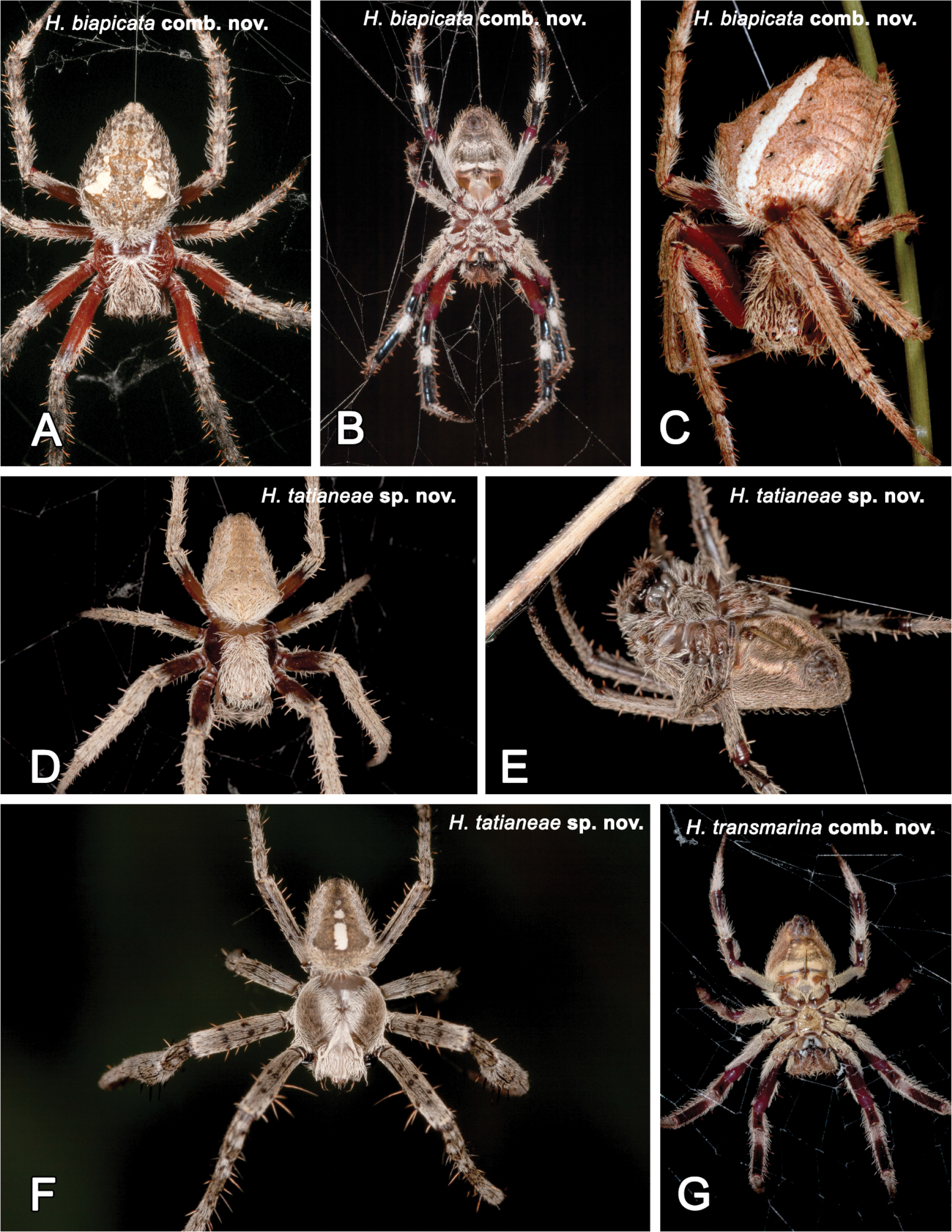
- A, B. H. biapicata, female from Hovea, Western Australia; C. H. biapicata, female from Rivervale, Western Australia; D, E. H. tatianeae, female from East Ringwood, Victoria; F. H. tatianeae, holotype male (Ringwood East, Victoria); G. H. transmarina, female from Burbank, Queensland

Scientific classification
- Kingdom: Animalia
- Phylum: Arthropoda
- Subphylum: Chelicerata
- Class: Arachnida
- Order: Araneae
- Infraorder: Araneomorphae
- Family: Araneidae
- Genus: Hortophora; Framenau & Castanheira, 2021

Type species
- Epeira biapicata L. Koch, 1871

Species
- 13, see text

= Hortophora =

Genus of spiders

Hortophora is a genus of South Pacific orb-weaver spiders first described by V. W. Framenau, R. L. C. Baptista and F. S. M. Oliveira in 2021.

== Species ==
As of November 2026 it contains thirteen species:

- H. biapicata (L. Koch, 1871) – Australia
- H. capitalis (L. Koch, 1871) – New Caledonia, Vanuatu, Fiji
- H. cucullus Framenau & Castanheira, 2021 – Australia (Western Australia, Northern Territory, Queensland, South Australia)
- H. flavicoma (Simon, 1880) – New Caledonia (incl. Loyalty Is.)
- H. lodicula (Keyserling, 1887) – Australia (Queensland, New South Wales, Victoria, Tasmania)
- H. megacantha Framenau & Castanheira, 2021 – Australia (Queensland, New South Wales)
- H. porongurup Framenau & Castanheira, 2021 – Australia (Western Australia)
- H. tatianeae Framenau & Castanheira, 2021 – Australia (South Australia, Queensland, New South Wales, Victoria, Tasmania)
- H. transmarina (Keyserling, 1865) – Papua New Guinea, Australia (Western Australia, Northern Territory, Queensland, New South Wales, Victoria, Norfolk Is.)
- H. urbana (Keyserling, 1887) – Australia (Western Australia, Queensland, New South Wales, Victoria)
- H. viridis (Keyserling, 1865) – Samoa
- H. walesiana (Karsch, 1878) – Australia (Western Australia, Northern Territory, Queensland, New South Wales)
- H. yesabah Framenau & Castanheira, 2021 – Australia (Queensland, New South Wales)
