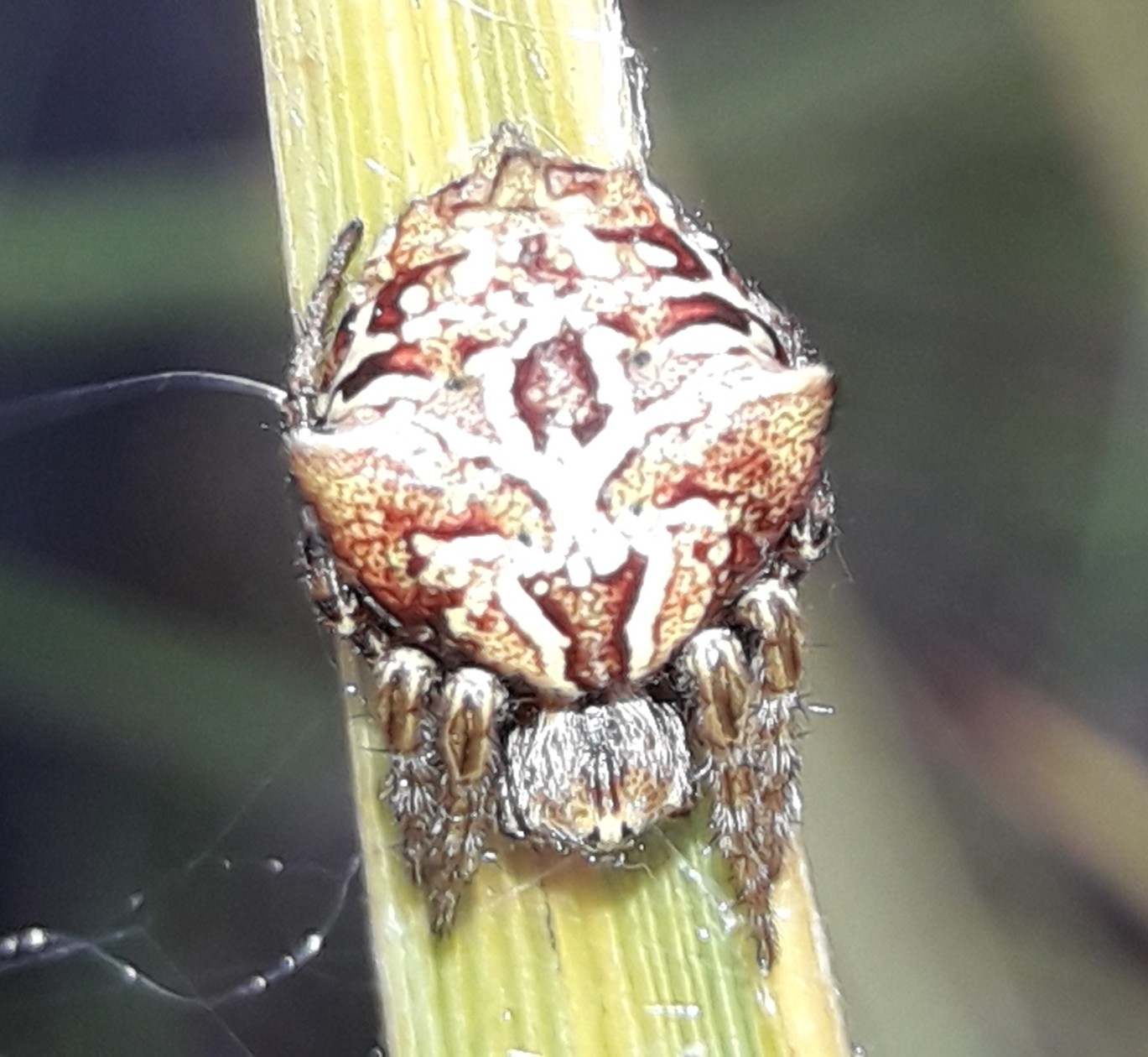
- A. decorosa in New Zealand
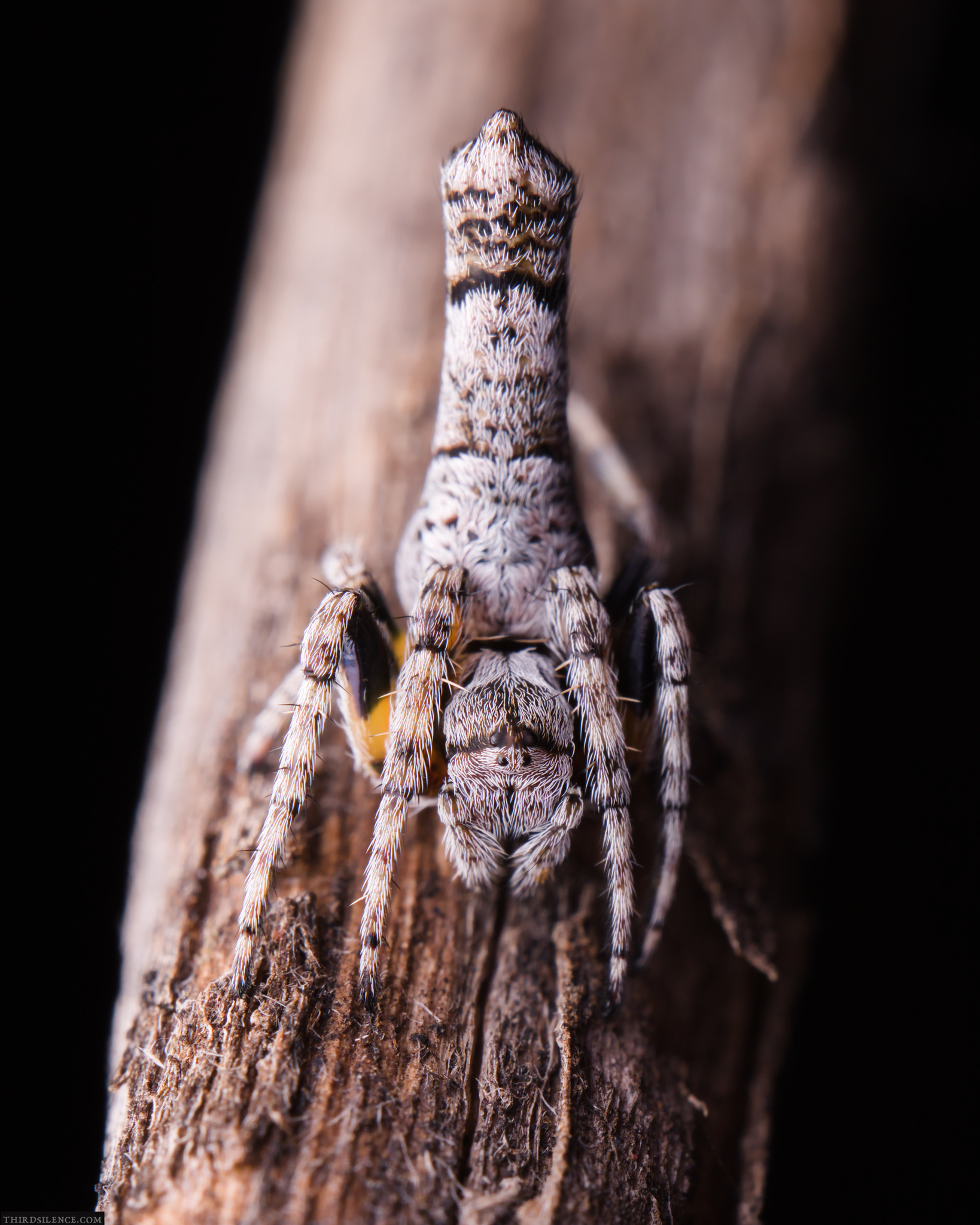
- A. olorina in Australia

Scientific classification
- Kingdom: Animalia
- Phylum: Arthropoda
- Subphylum: Chelicerata
- Class: Arachnida
- Order: Araneae
- Infraorder: Araneomorphae
- Family: Araneidae
- Genus: Acroaspis; Karsch, 1878

Type species
- A. olorina Karsch, 1878

Species
- 6, see text

= Acroaspis =

Genus of spiders

Acroaspis is a genus of South Pacific orb-weaver spiders first described by Ferdinand Karsch in 1878.

== Distribution ==
Spiders in this genus are endemic to Australia and New Zealand:

== Species ==
As of October 2026, this genus includes five species:

- Acroaspis decorosa (Urquhart, 1894) – New Zealand
- Acroaspis lancearia (Keyserling, 1887) – Australia (New South Wales)
- Acroaspis mamillana (Keyserling, 1887) – Australia (New South Wales)
- Acroaspis olorina Karsch, 1878 – Australia (Western Australia, New South Wales)
- Acroaspis scutifer (Keyserling, 1886) – Australia (New South Wales)
