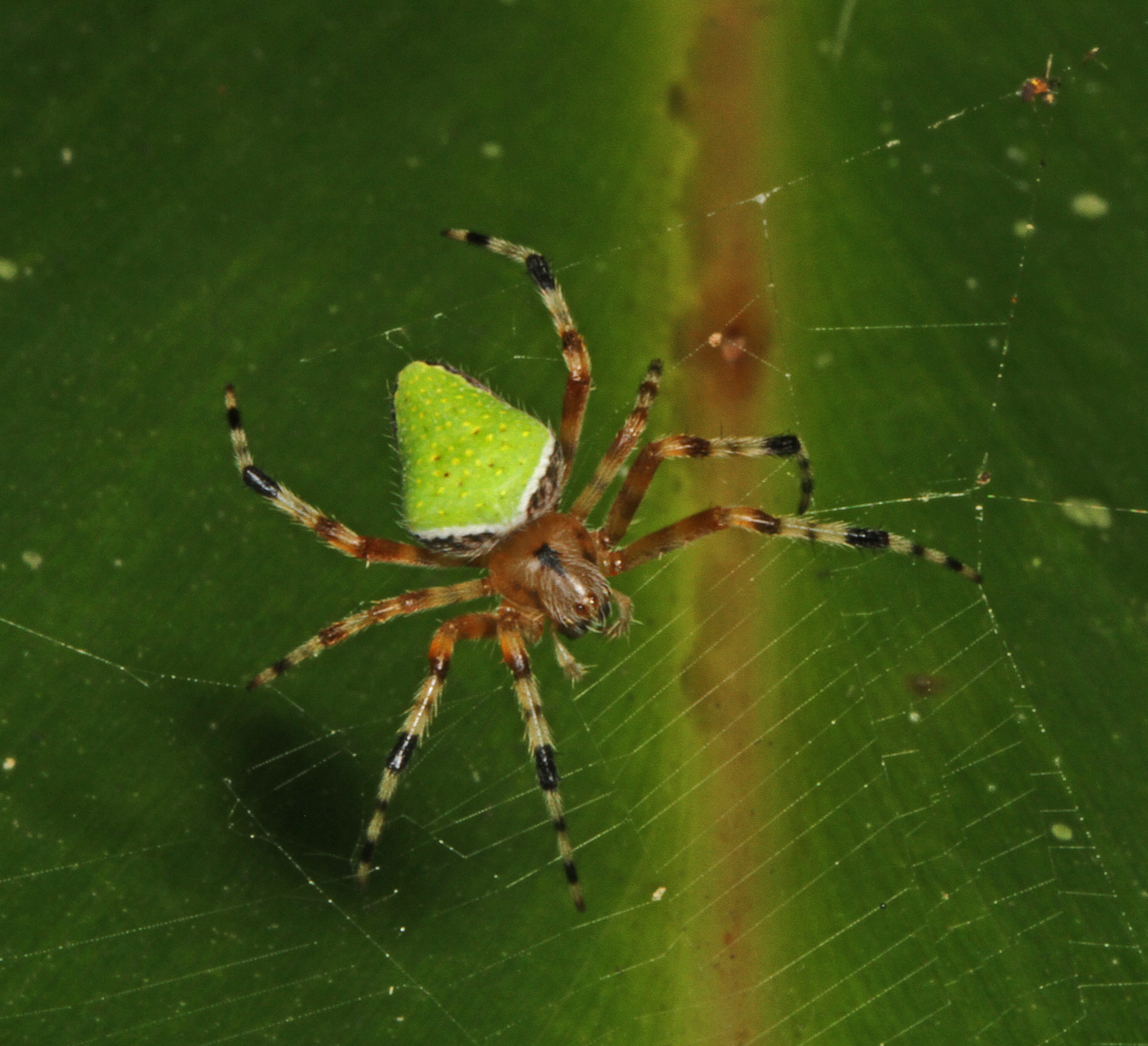
- Eriophora nephiloides from Belmopan, Belize

Scientific classification
- Kingdom: Animalia
- Phylum: Arthropoda
- Subphylum: Chelicerata
- Class: Arachnida
- Order: Araneae
- Infraorder: Araneomorphae
- Family: Araneidae
- Genus: Eriophora; Simon, 1864

Type species
- E. ravilla (C. L. Koch, 1844)

Species
- 8, see text

Synonyms
- Epeirella

= Eriophora =

Genus of spiders

Eriophora is a genus of orb-weaver spiders first described by Eugène Simon in 1895. These spiders are found in tropical climates in the Americas, Africa, and Asia. The name is derived from Ancient Greek roots and means "wool bearing".

== Description ==
As is common in orb-weaving spiders, species in the Eriophora genus feature a third claw used to weave their webs. While most tend to spin a balanced and symmetrical web of small to medium size, E. fuliginea has been seen to craft a large, asymmetrical web that may be 1.6 - 3m in diameter with an open "hub" in the top third of the web.

Females are typically larger than males, and have a very long epigyne scape. Males in the genus generally have an enlarged tibia of the second leg.

These spiders feature a variety of colors and patterns, the most notable being the bright green abdomens that are sometimes present in E. nephiloides and, less frequently, E. ravilla. The abdominal dorsum may have a pattern of white spots or stripes. More typical, however, is a reddish-brown to gray coloration.

== Spiders in Space ==
Eriophora transmarina (now H. transmarina) was the second species of spider to enter orbit and successfully spin a web in space, and the first to be documented throughout the process. Their opportunity to make history was organized by a team of NASA scientists and students from Glen Waverly Secondary College in Melbourne, Australia.

The students and scientists worked together over two and a half years to develop an experiment to observe how (or if) the spidernauts would successfully adapt to and build webs in microgravity—and their careful, dedicated work came to fruition on January 16, 2003, when a team of eight spidernauts entered orbit aboard the Space Shuttle Columbia on her 28th mission. The spiders were supported by a ground-based control team, with lead spidernaut Cadbury at the helm.

The Spiders in Space project considered many species during the planning phase, but settled on Eriophora transmarina (now H. transmarina) due to their perfectly symmetrical webs. Their consistency on Earth would allow the team to quickly identify any changes the spiders made to their web design while adjusting to microgravity. Unfortunately, Columbia met a tragic end on her return journey when she disintegrated upon reentry into Earth's atmosphere. The spiders, including beloved spidernauts Wako, Jenny, and Slayer, did not survive.

While most data was lost in the disaster, low resolution images received during the mission indicated that the spiders adapted quickly to microgravity and were successfully building webs. The lead spider, Wako, was particularly ambitious: she began spinning within four days of her arrival into orbit and completed her web's construction in just over half the time her Earth-bound counterpart, Cadbury, required.

The spacefaring spiders who perished in the crash were mourned by all involved in the project.

== Species ==
Most species now grouped here have been classified as Araneus at some time in their description history. As of November 2026 Eriophora contains eight species:

- Eriophora chorata Silva-Marques, Motta & Ferreira-Sousa, 2026 – Panama, Peru, Brazil
- Eriophora conica (Yin, Wang & Zhang, 1987) – China
- Eriophora edax (Blackwall, 1863) – USA to Brazil
- Eriophora fuliginea (C. L. Koch, 1838) – Honduras to Brazil
- Eriophora nephiloides (O. Pickard-Cambridge, 1889) – Guatemala to Guyana
- Eriophora neufvilleorum (Lessert, 1930) – Congo, Ethiopia
- Eriophora ravilla (C. L. Koch, 1844) – USA to Brazil
- Eriophora virgata (Piza, 1976) – Brazil

== Gallery ==
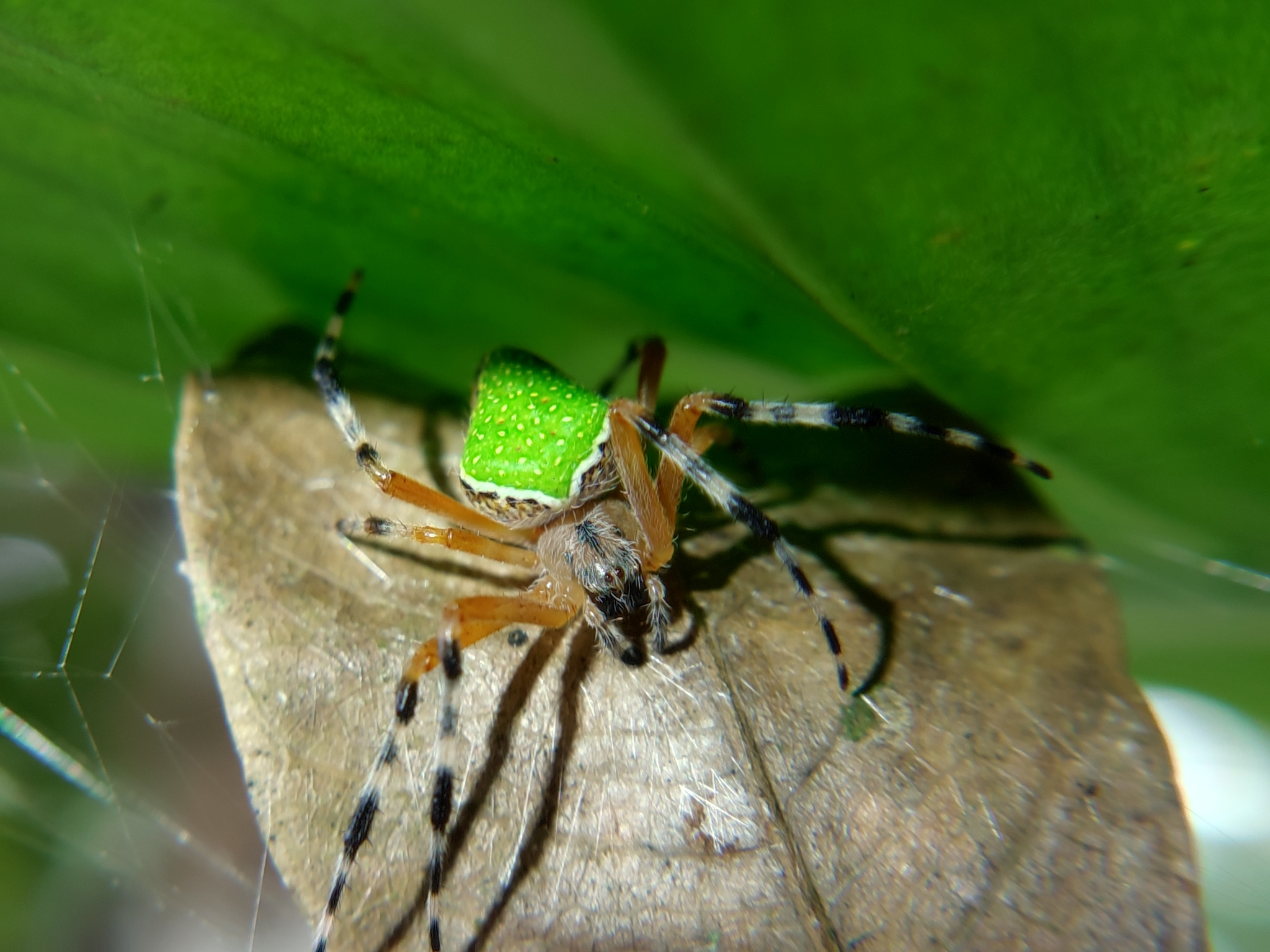
E. nephiloides, Ocosingo, Chis., México

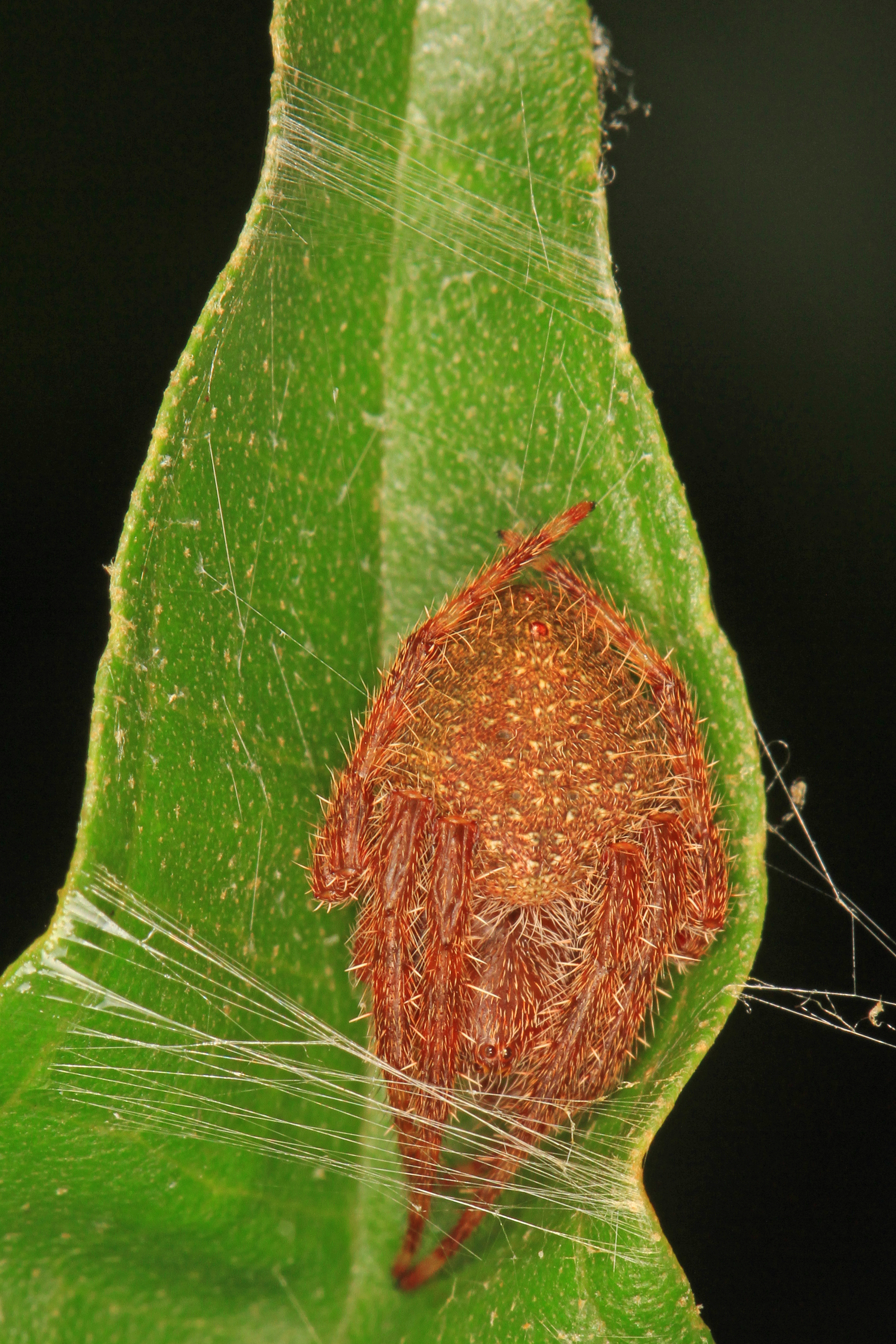
E. ravilla, Florida

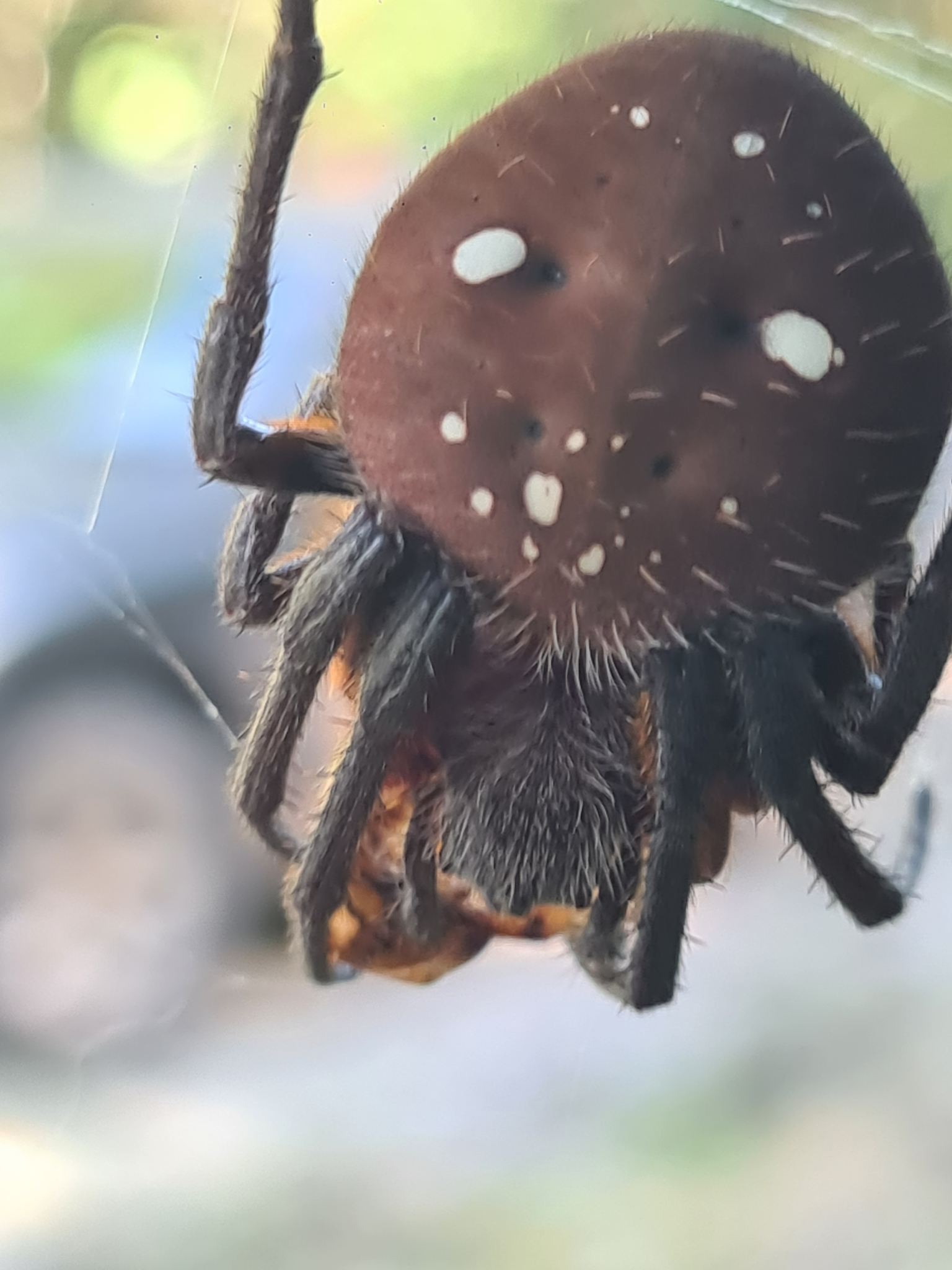
E. fuliginea, Kwakoegron, Suriname

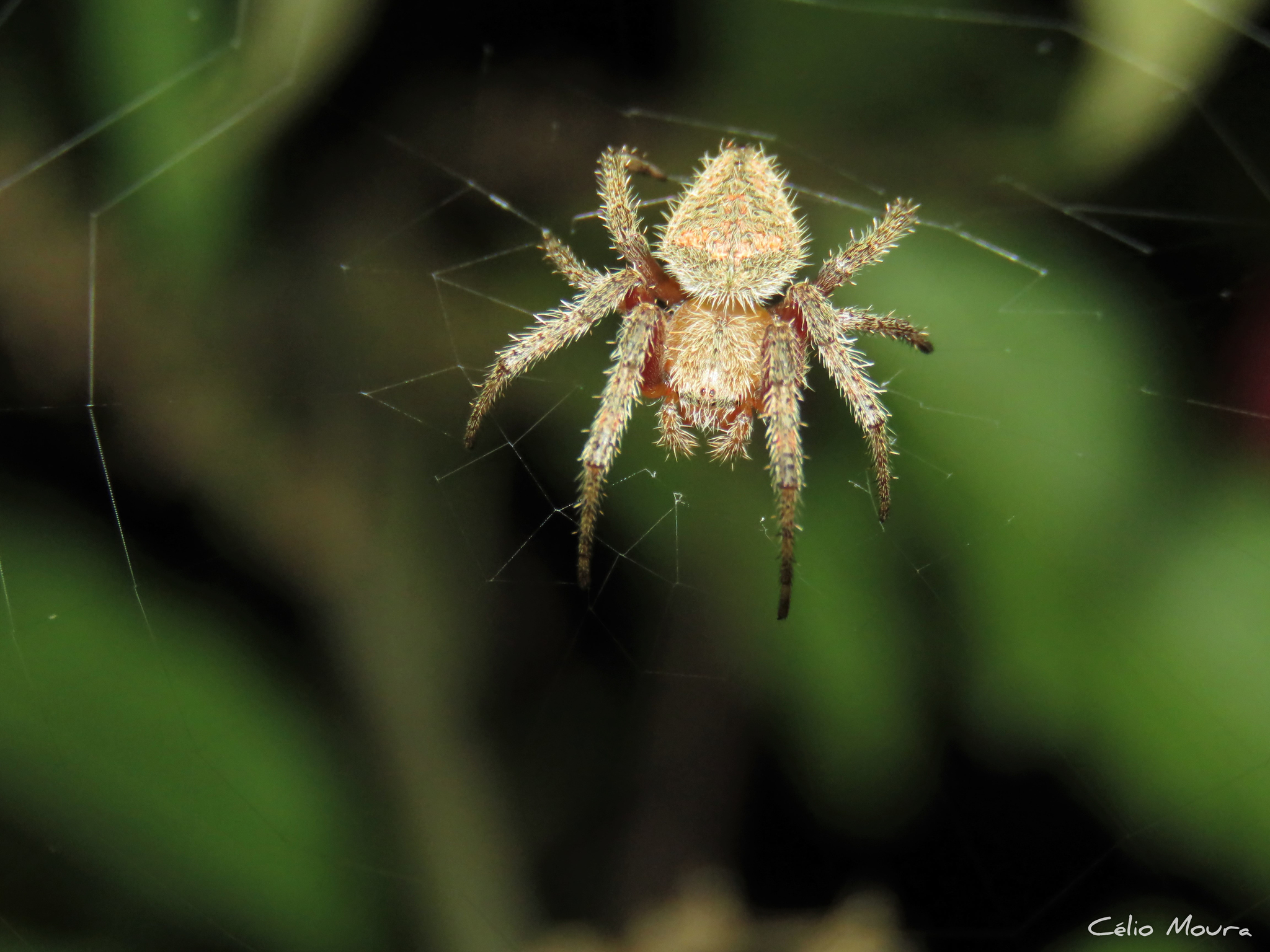
E. edax, Patacuba, Brasil

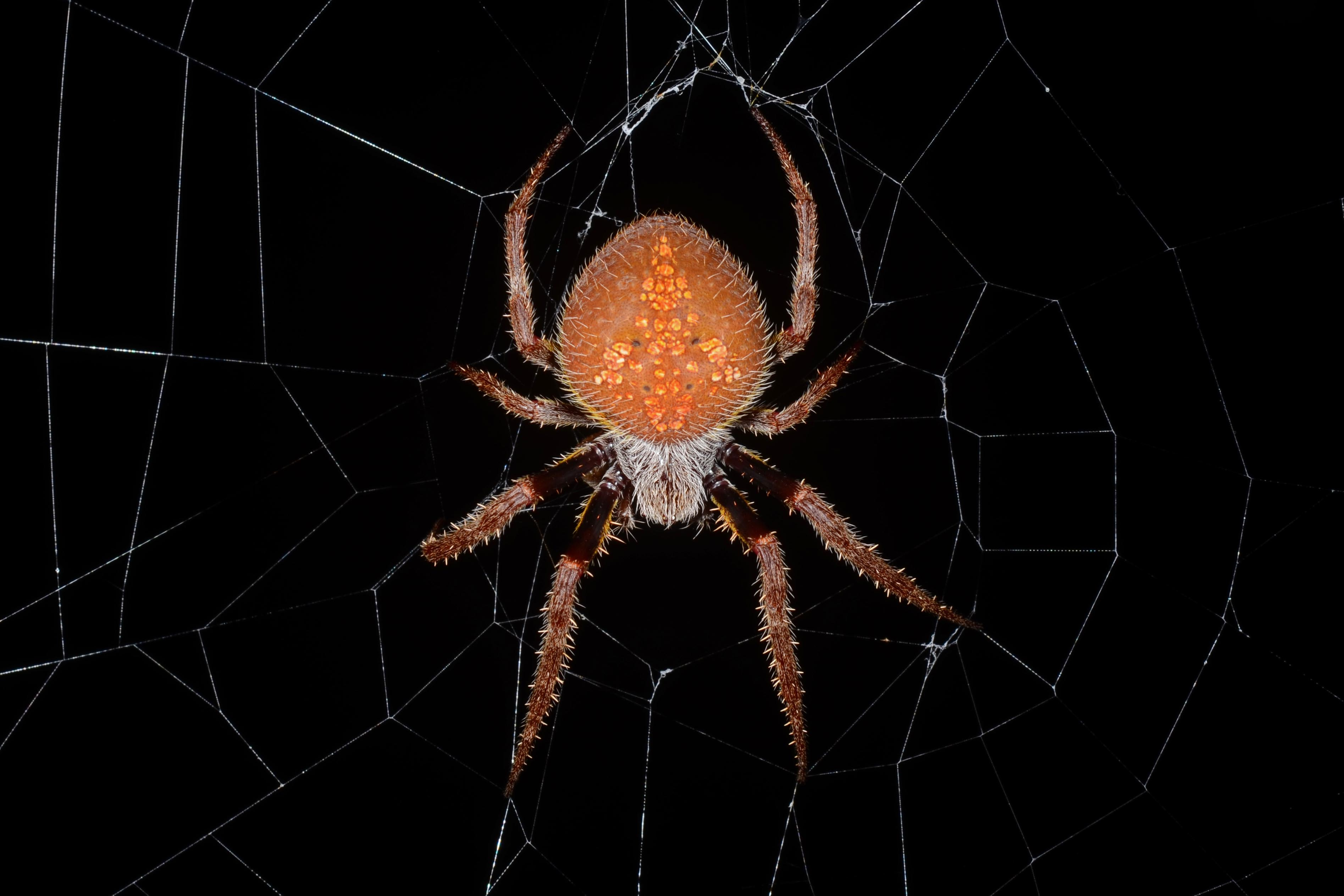
E. ravilla, Lower Suwannee National Wildlife Refuge, Florida

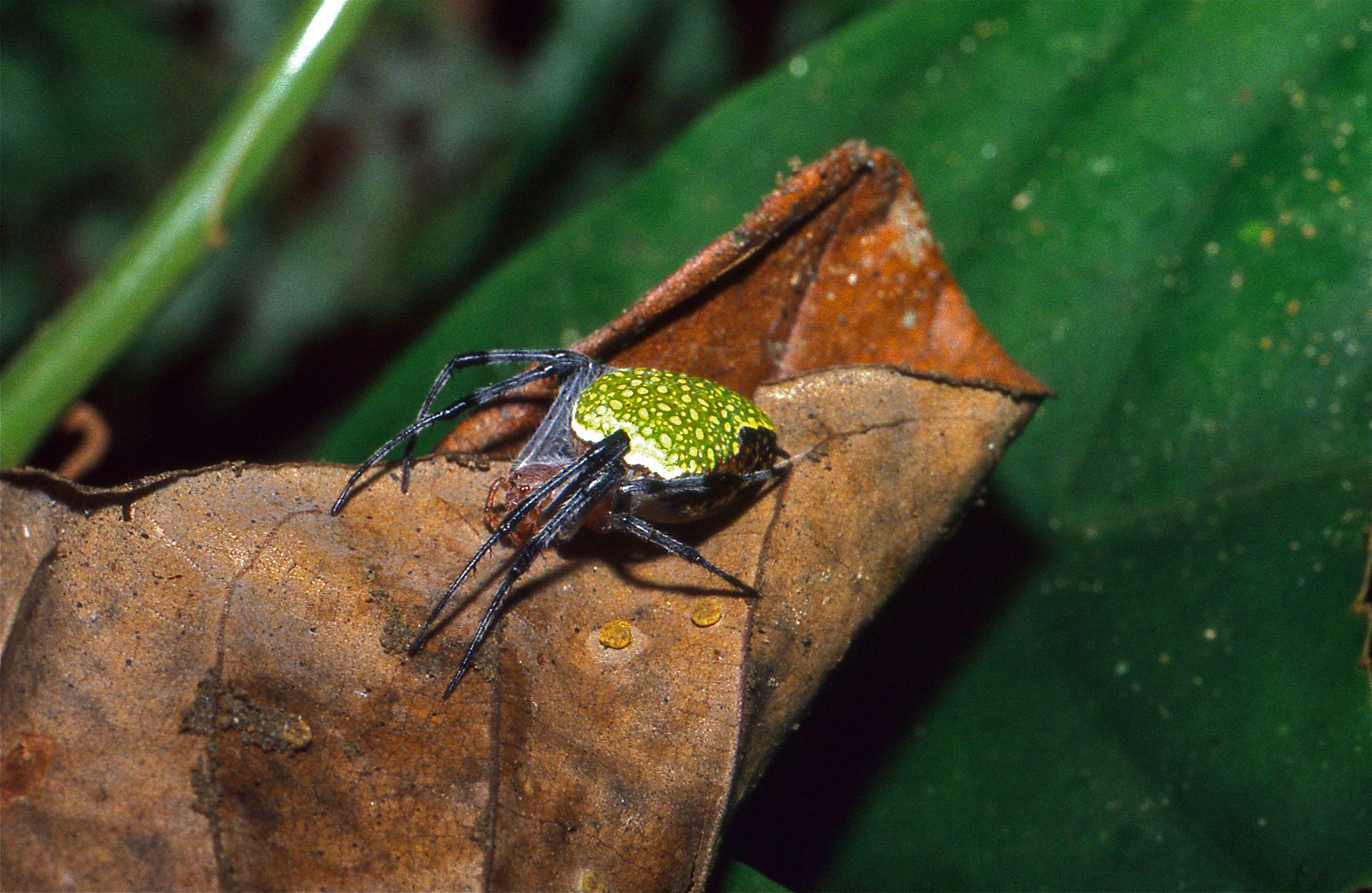
E. nephiloides, Osa Peninsula, Costa Rica
