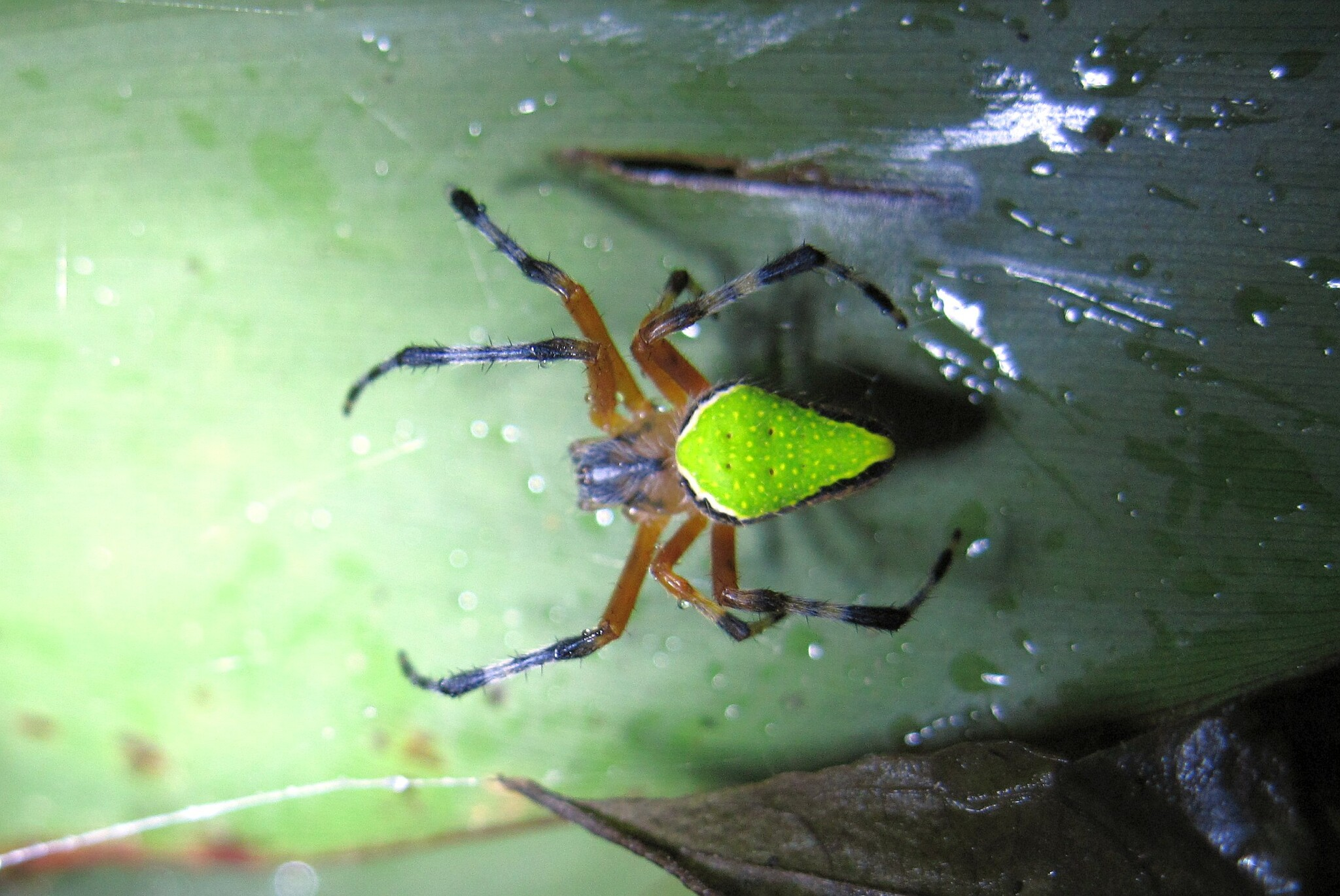

Scientific classification
- Domain: Eukaryota
- Kingdom: Animalia
- Phylum: Arthropoda
- Subphylum: Chelicerata
- Class: Arachnida
- Order: Araneae
- Infraorder: Araneomorphae
- Family: Araneidae
- Genus: Eriophora
- Species: E. nephiloides

Binomial name
- Eriophora nephiloides O. Pickard-Cambridge, 1889

= Eriophora nephiloides =

Species of spider

Eriophora nephiloides is a species of orb weaver in the spider family Araneidae first described in Biologia Centrali-Americana: Arachnida-Aranediea by Octavius Pickard-Cambridge in 1889. Its recognized range is from Guatemala to Guayana, but has been documented as far south as Bolivia.

== Description ==
Eriophora nephiloides is distinguished by a diamond-shaped abdomen with the rear subtriangle being elongated and pointed and the fore subtriangle being shorter and rounded. Its abdominal dorsum ranges in color from a reddish-brown to a distinctive bright green or yellow, and may have white spots scattered across/throughout or stripes around the edge. Its underside has a jet-black square or rectangle, which is bounded in either white or yellow. The cephalothorax and upper legs are dark yellow-brown, and the lower segments of the legs feature black and white banding.

== Gallery ==
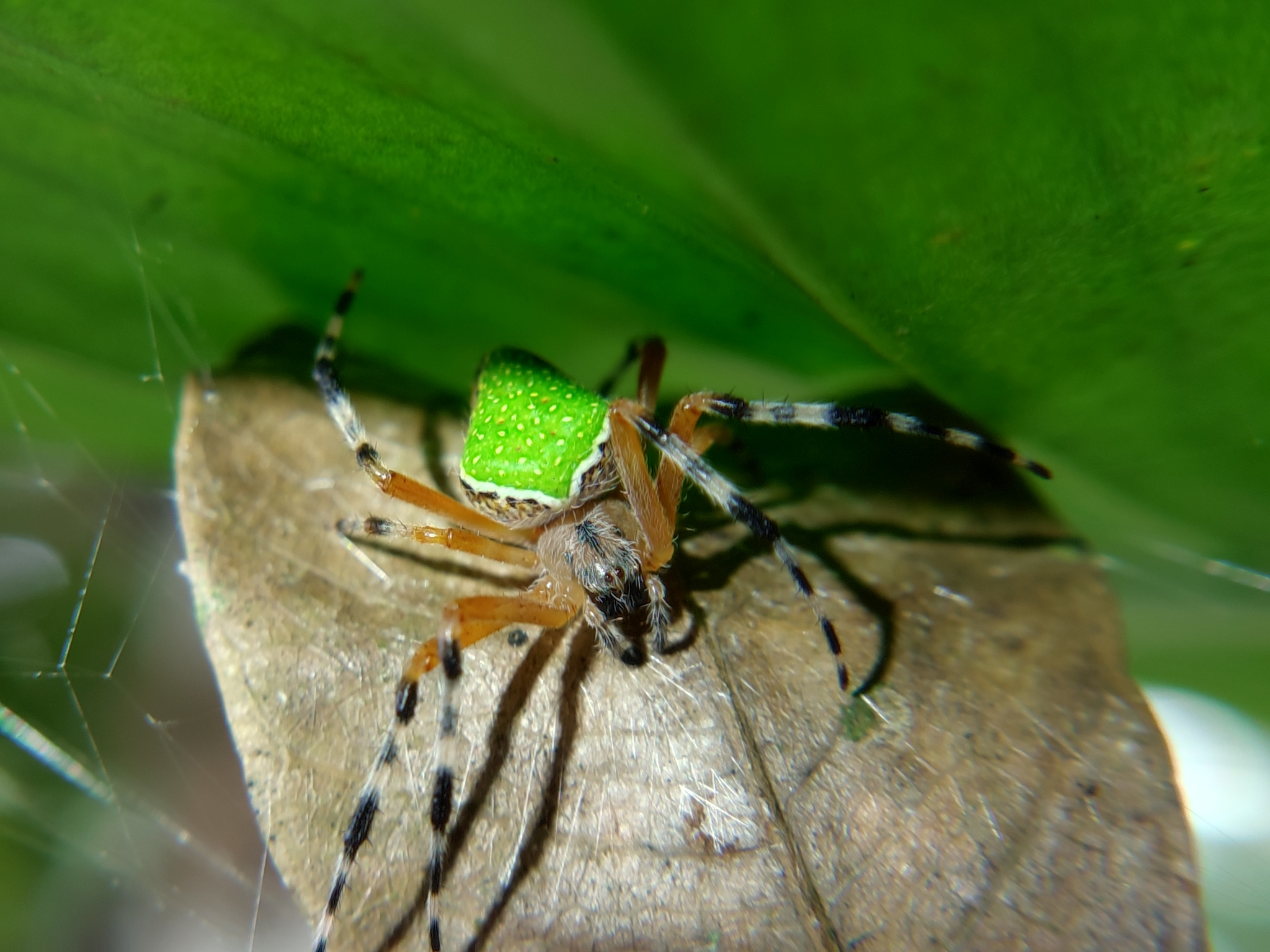
E. nephiloides

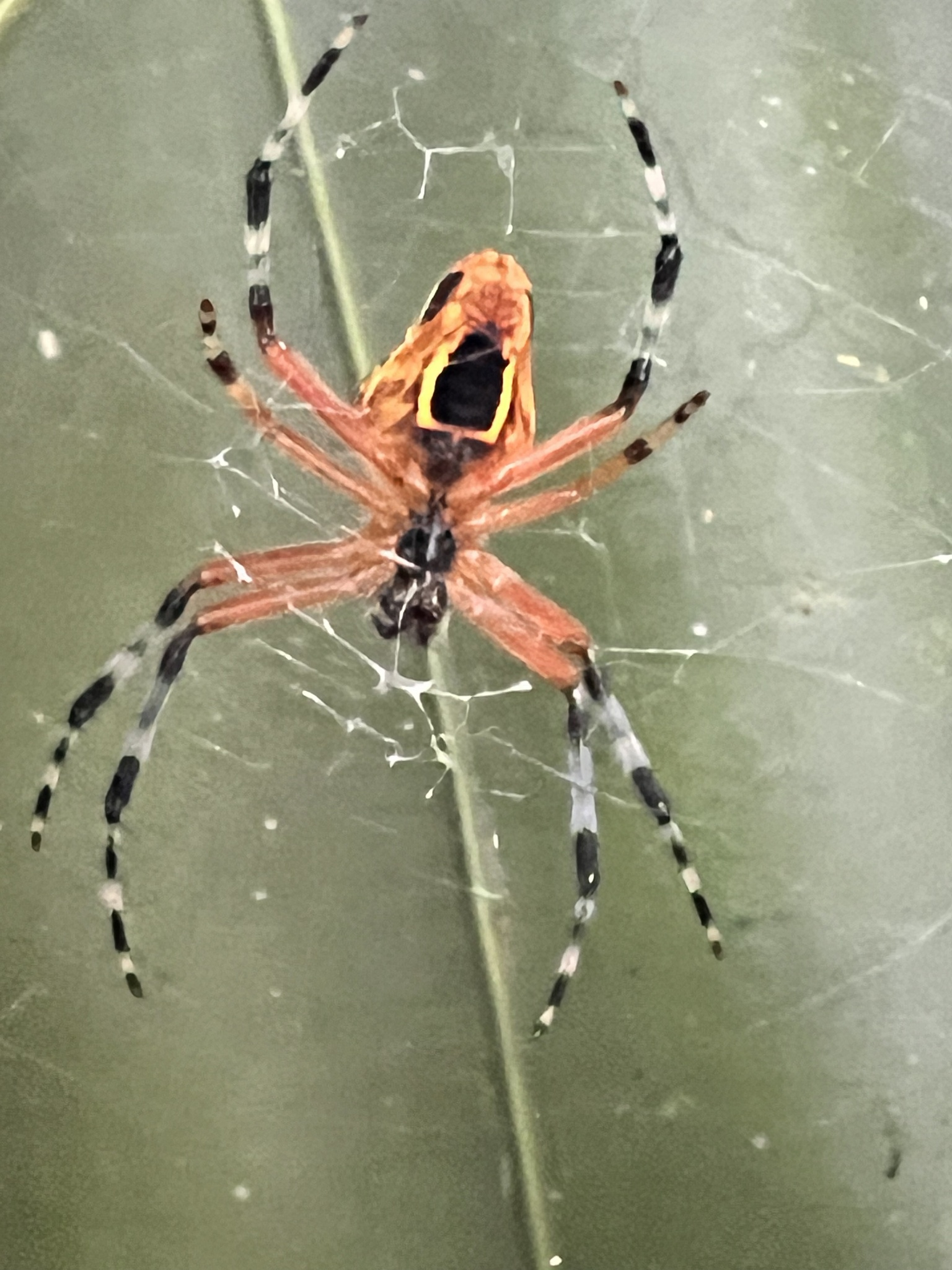
E. nephiloides, underside of abdomen.

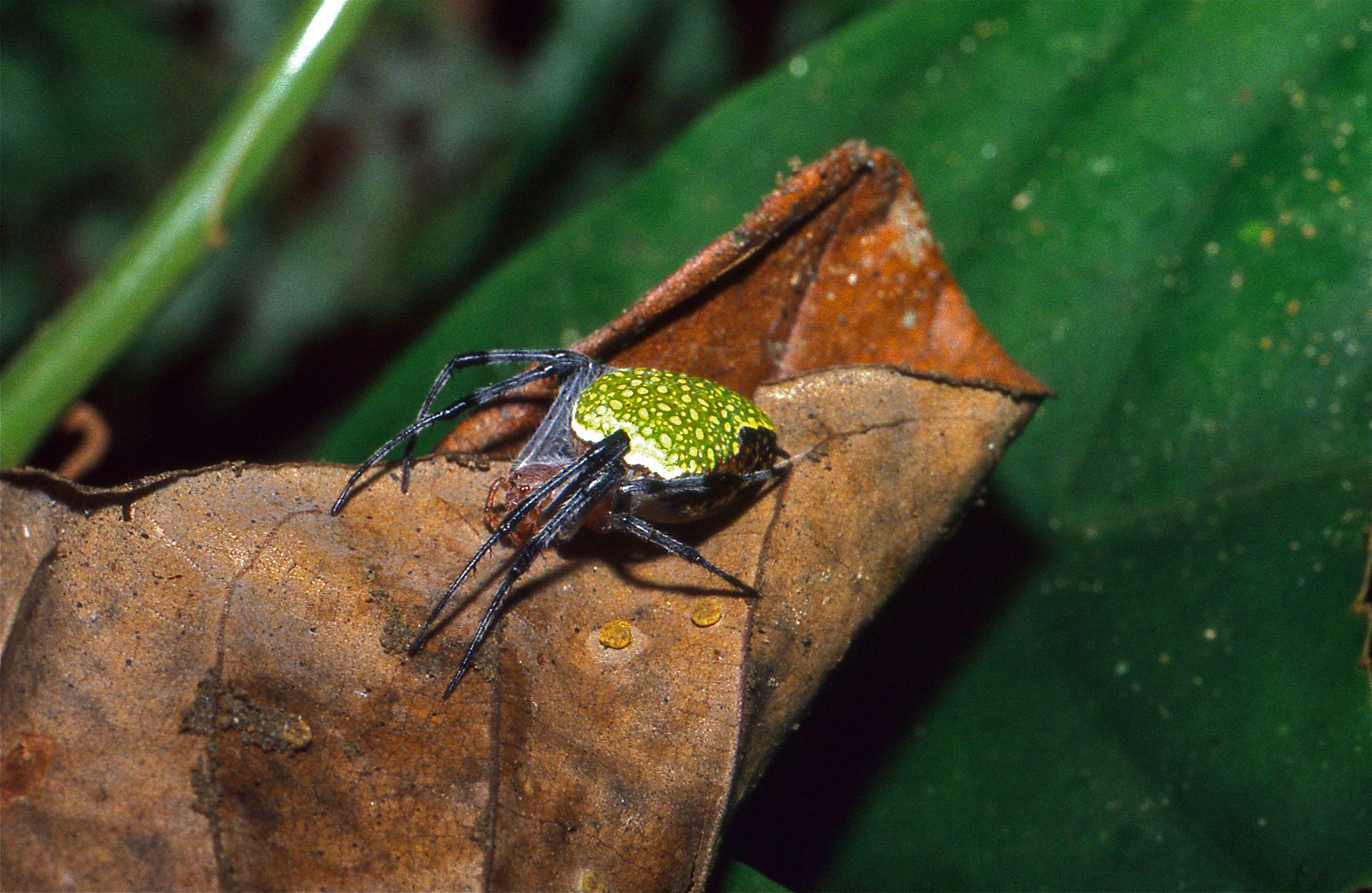
E. nephiloides

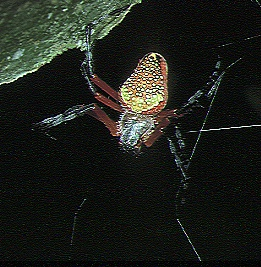
E. nephiloides
