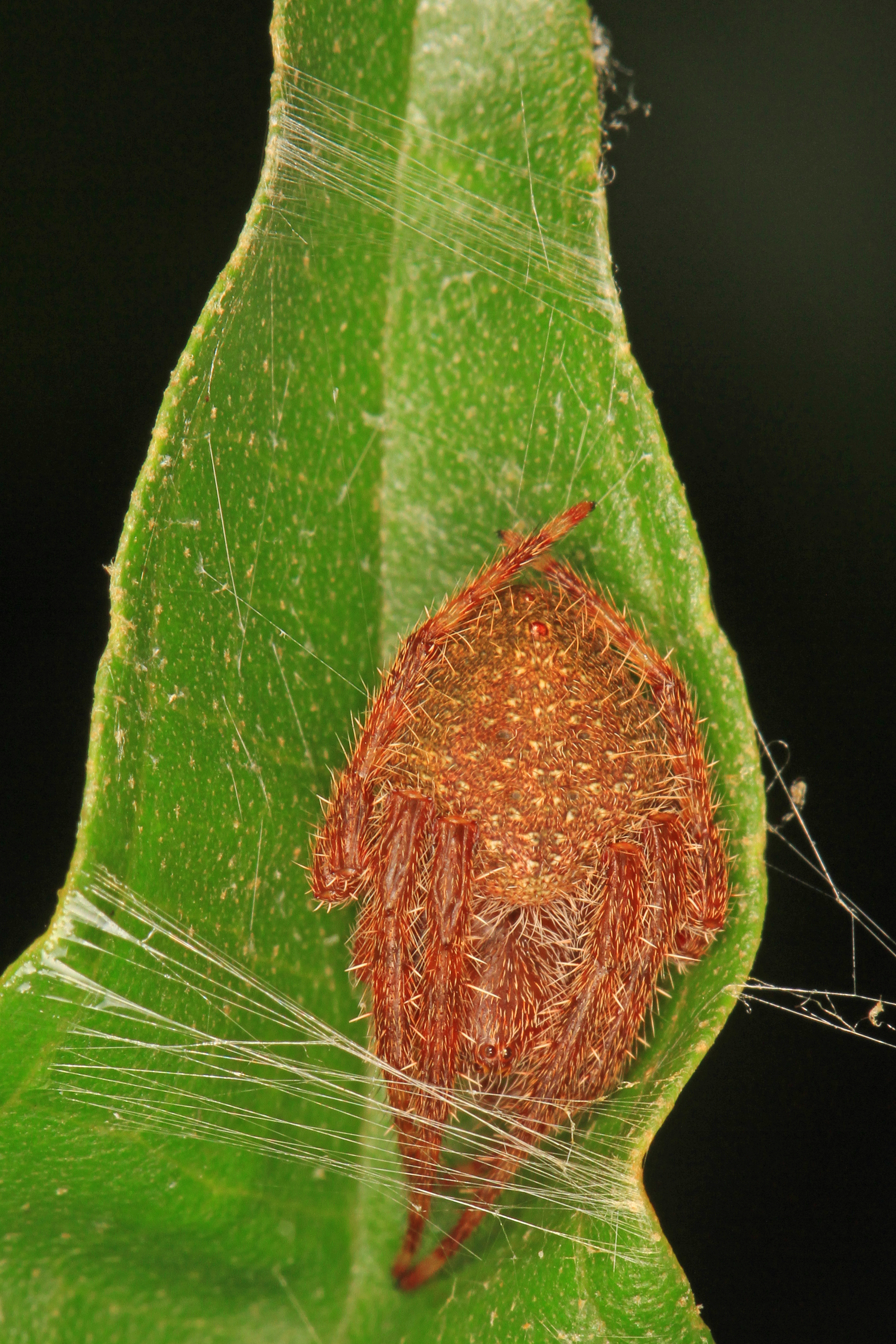

Scientific classification
- Kingdom: Animalia
- Phylum: Arthropoda
- Subphylum: Chelicerata
- Class: Arachnida
- Order: Araneae
- Infraorder: Araneomorphae
- Family: Araneidae
- Genus: Eriophora
- Species: E. ravilla

Binomial name
- Eriophora ravilla (C. L. Koch, 1844)

= Eriophora ravilla =

Species of spider

Eriophora ravilla, the tropical orb weaver, is a species of orb weaver in the spider family Araneidae. It is found in a range from the United States to Brazil.

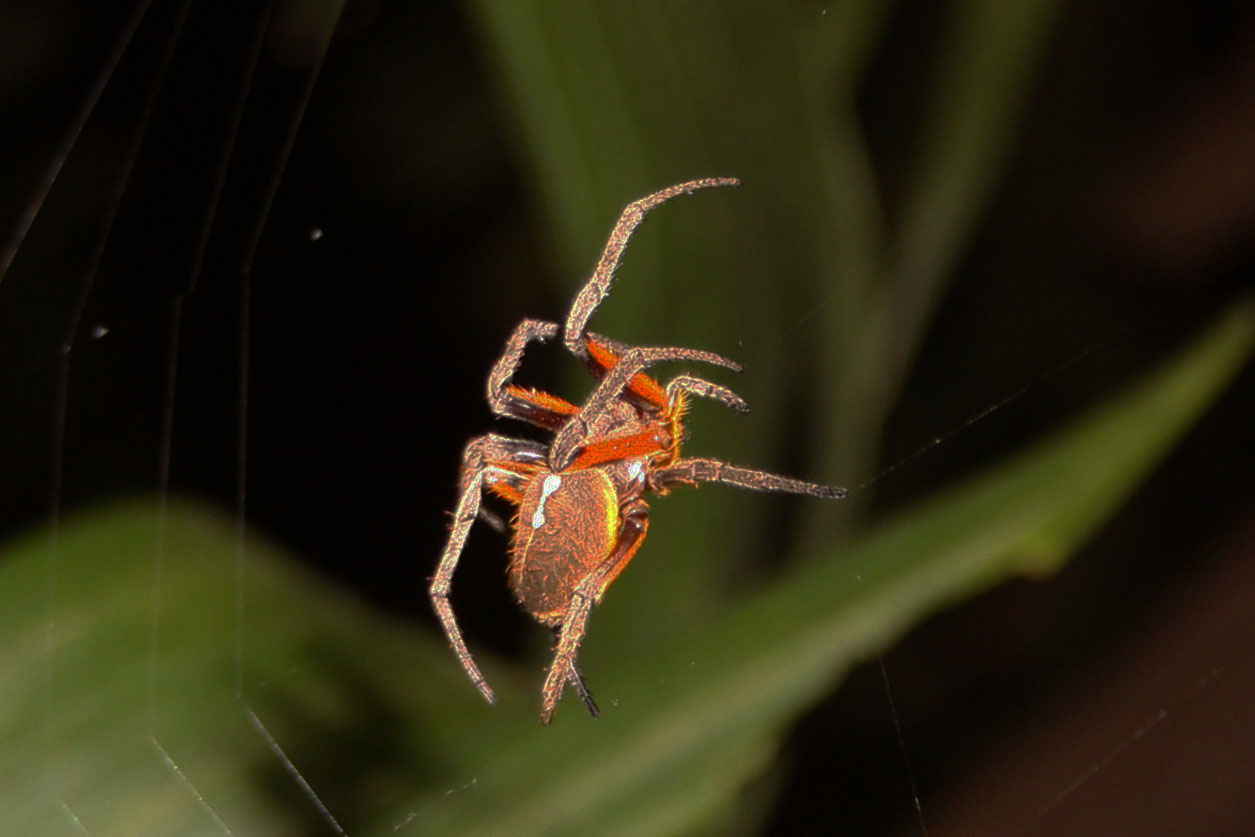
Tropical orb weaver, Eriophora ravilla

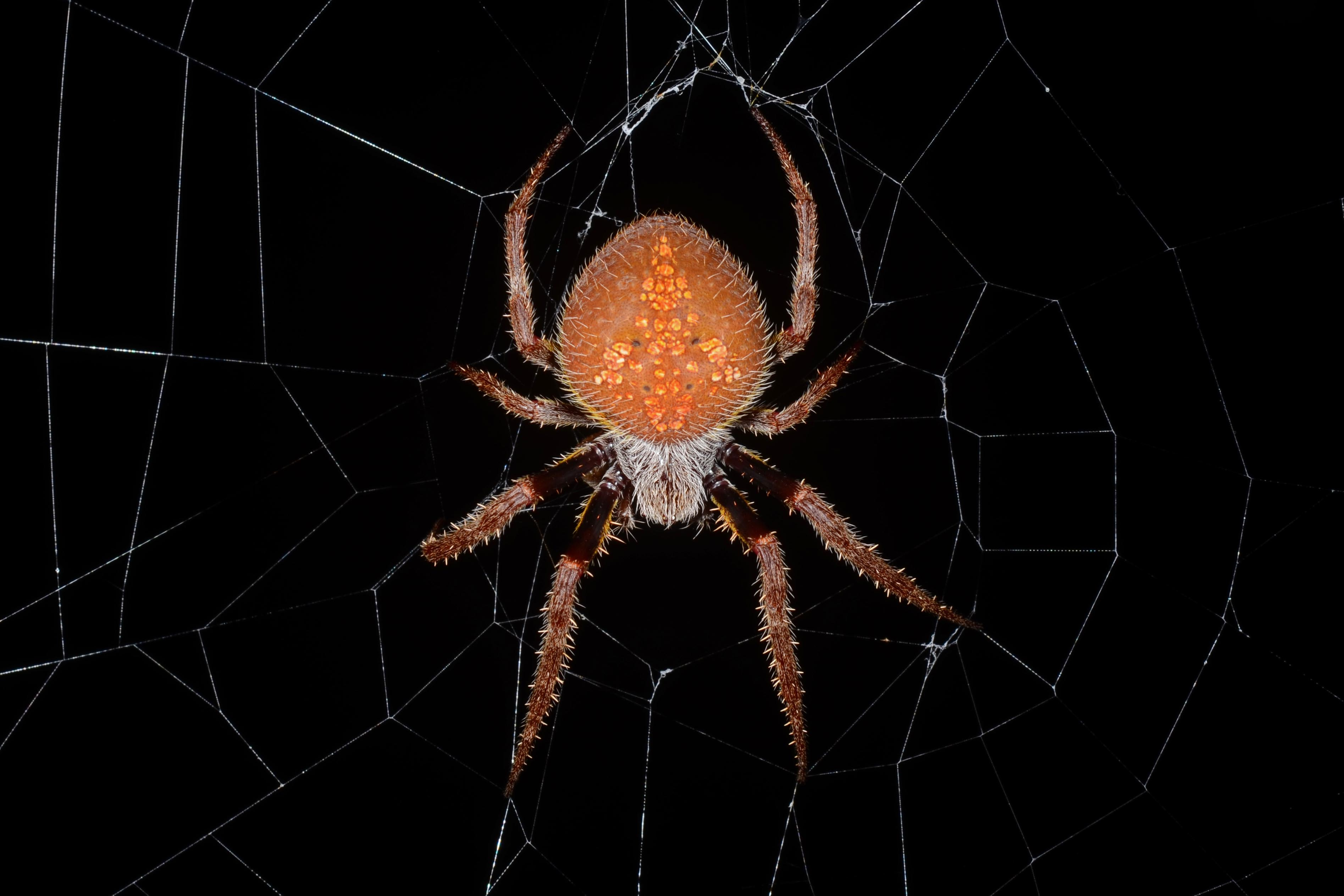
Tropical orb weaver, Eriophora ravilla
