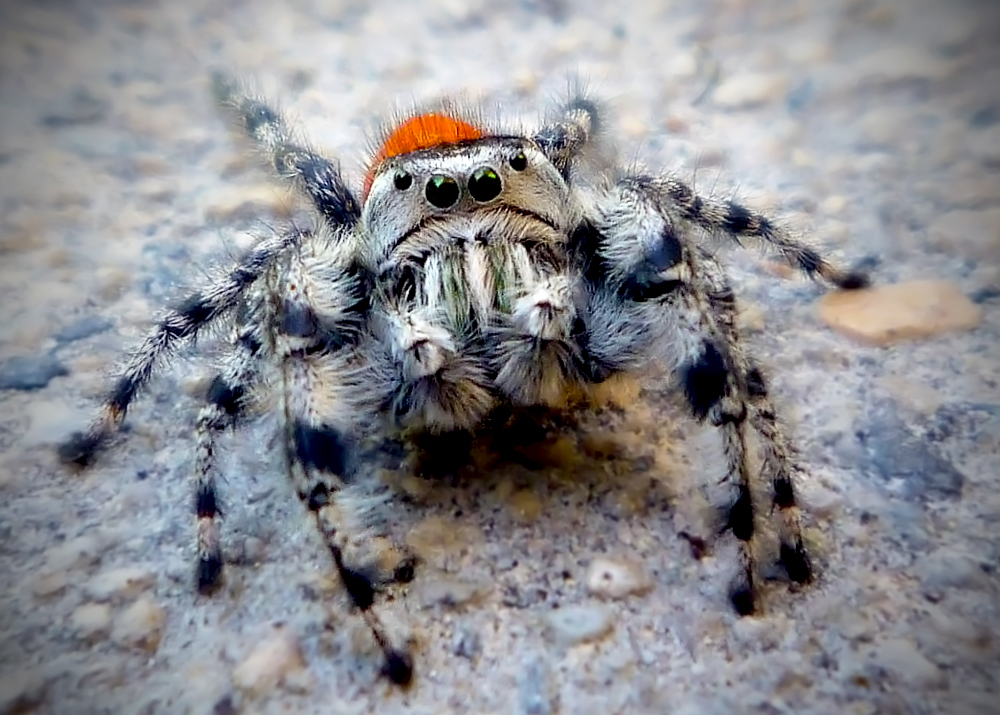

Scientific classification
- Kingdom: Animalia
- Phylum: Arthropoda
- Subphylum: Chelicerata
- Class: Arachnida
- Order: Araneae
- Infraorder: Araneomorphae
- Family: Salticidae
- Genus: Phidippus
- Species: P. adumbratus

Binomial name
- Phidippus adumbratus Gertsch, 1934

= Phidippus adumbratus =

Species of spider

Phidippus adumbratus is a species of jumping spider in the family Salticidae. It is found in the United States and Mexico. The type species was collected In Los Angeles and named in 1934. Adumbratus is one of the insignarius group of Phidippus spiders.

Within the United States, Phidippus adumbratus is within the California Floristic Province in native chaparral and in oak-sycamore-chaparral woodland between 500–3,700 ft (150–1,130 m). A spider survey published in 1999 found P. adumbratus present in coastal sage scrub in the vicinity of San Diego. A spider survey report published in 2022 found individuals in Baja California's Central Desert ecoregion in Sierra Blanca, Ensenada Municipality, Mesa Escondido and San Antonio de Las Minas on the Baja California peninsula.

The etymology of the Latin name is from the adjective adumbratus, meaning "secret, in the dark (perhaps alluding to the fact that the abdomen of the holotype is missing, and the describer was 'in the dark' as to its appearance)." According to BugGuide, adumbratus is often used by zoologists to indicate a "hazy dark pattern".

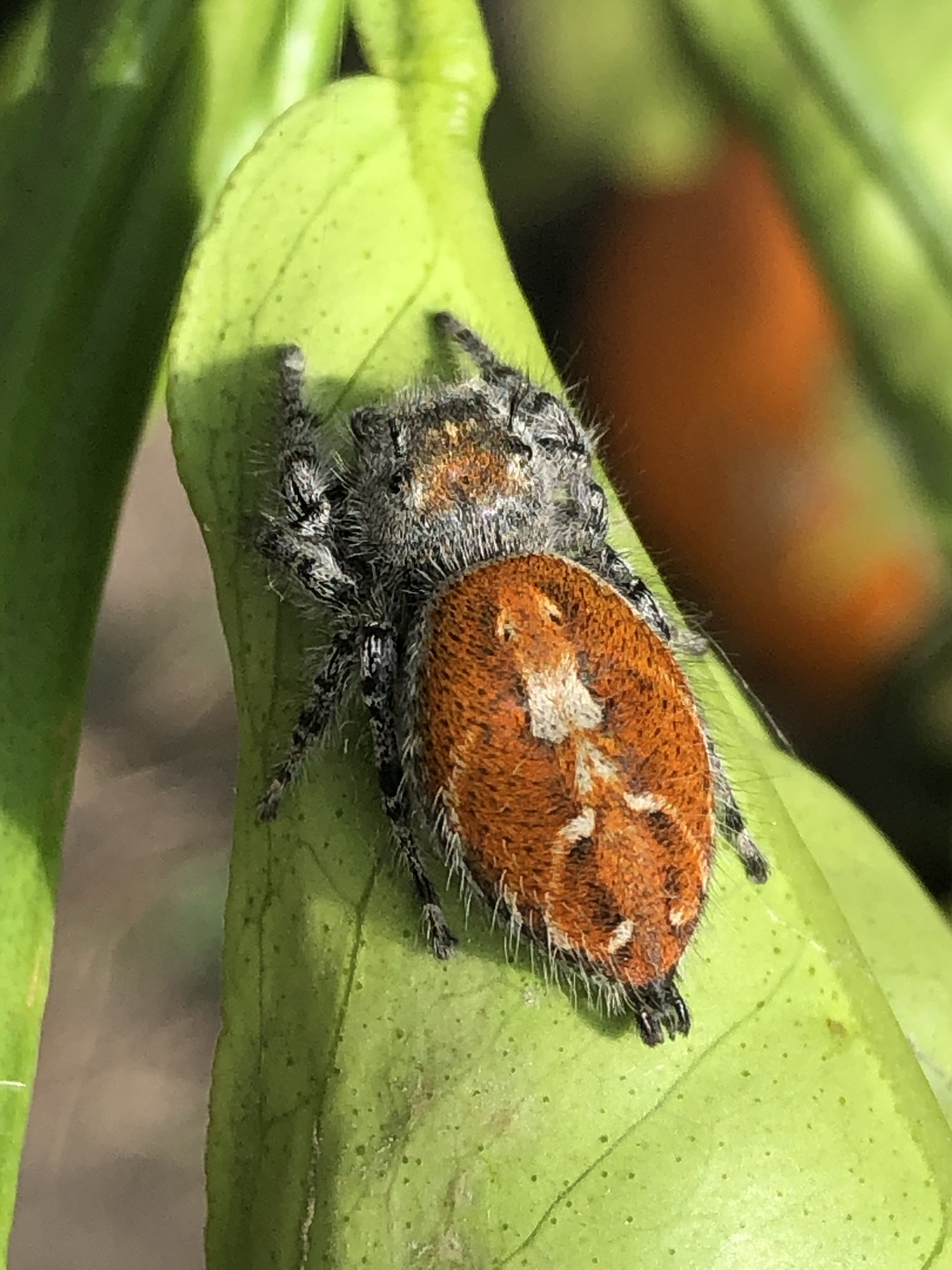
Phidippus adumbratus females (pictured) typically place their egg sacs under rocks
