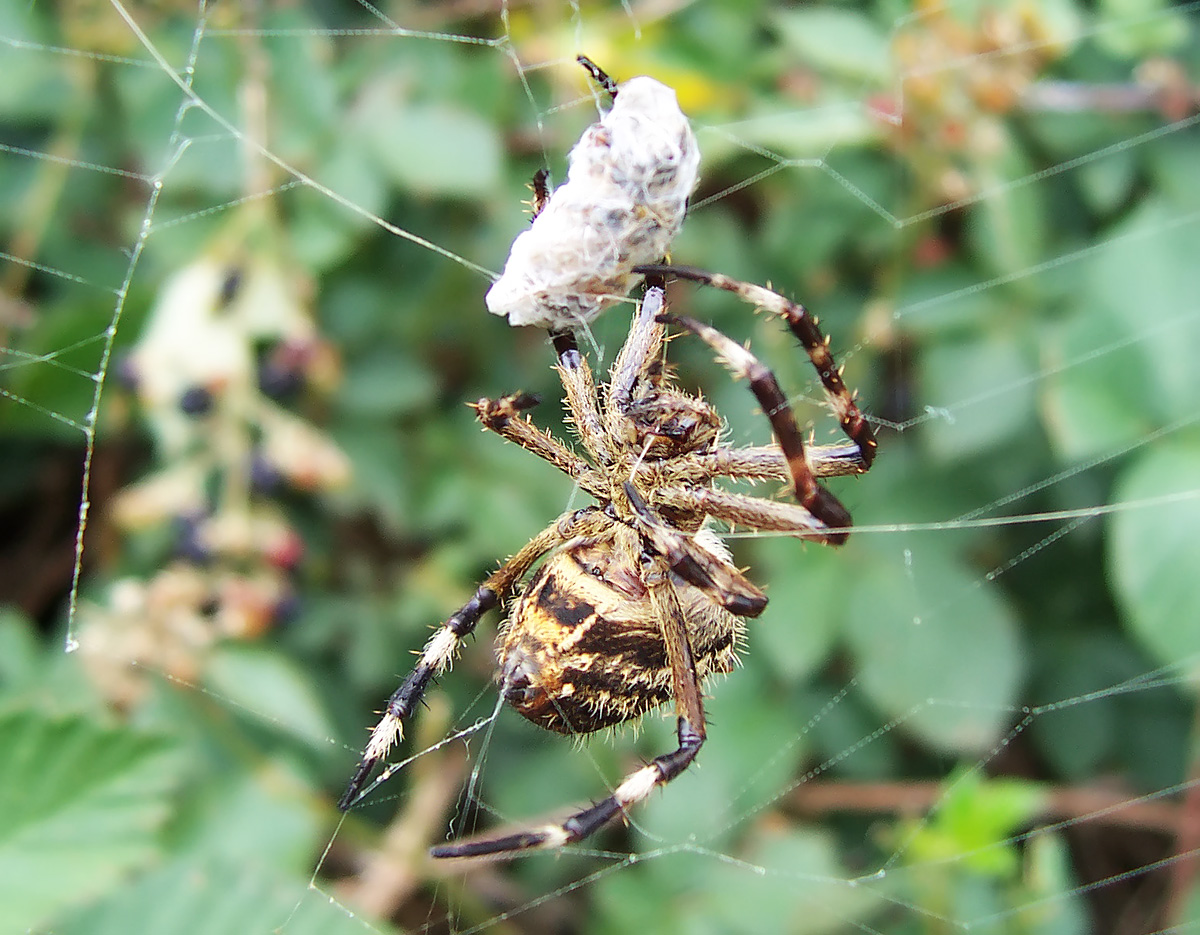

Scientific classification
- Domain: Eukaryota
- Kingdom: Animalia
- Phylum: Arthropoda
- Subphylum: Chelicerata
- Class: Arachnida
- Order: Araneae
- Infraorder: Araneomorphae
- Family: Araneidae
- Genus: Hortophora
- Species: H. transmarina

Binomial name
- Hortophora transmarina (Keyserling, 1865)

Synonyms
- Epeira transmarina Epeira viridis Epeira producta Epeira thyridota Epeira capitalis Araneus productus Aranea producta Araneus capitalis Araneus transmarinus Eriophora transmarina

= Australian garden orb weaver spider =

Species of spider

The Australian garden orb weaver spider (Hortophora transmarina) is a very common species of spider with many variants in size, shape, and colour across the coastal and northern regions of Australia. They have very large abdomens when well-fed and exhibit a tremendous colour-range from off-white through tan, brown to almost black. They have a roughly leaf-shaped pattern on the top of their abdomen with a complex outline that is darker than the surrounding area. There may also be several whitish spots or one or more stripes. The spiders' cephalothoraxes (heads) and proximal (closer to the body) leg segments are usually darker, mostly reddish or reddish brown. They are able to change their colour with each moult to better match the background upon which they rest during the day.

The spiders are notable for the often large and intricate webs which they weave at night. They are usually nocturnal feeders, resting head down in their webs waiting to catch flying insects. They make their sticky rounded orb webs near lights and between trees where insects are likely to fly. During the day the spider will often rest somewhere near the web, usually under a leaf or twig, or in a crevice in bark or rock. They are commonly found around human habitation so may be found resting under leaves and in similar places. When disturbed they will retreat towards this rest area, although under imminent danger the spider will drop to the ground and "play dead". Occasionally individual spiders will remain on the web during the day, possibly when prey has not been caught for a while, but this makes them more vulnerable to predation by birds.

Their bite is not dangerous to humans but may induce mild, local pain, redness, and occasionally swelling for a period of 30 minutes up to three to four hours.

The female is larger than the male, having a body length of 20 – 25 mm compared with 15 – 17 mm for the males. Females may also be distinguished by a needle-like epigynum protruding in the direction of the spinnerets.

== Gallery ==
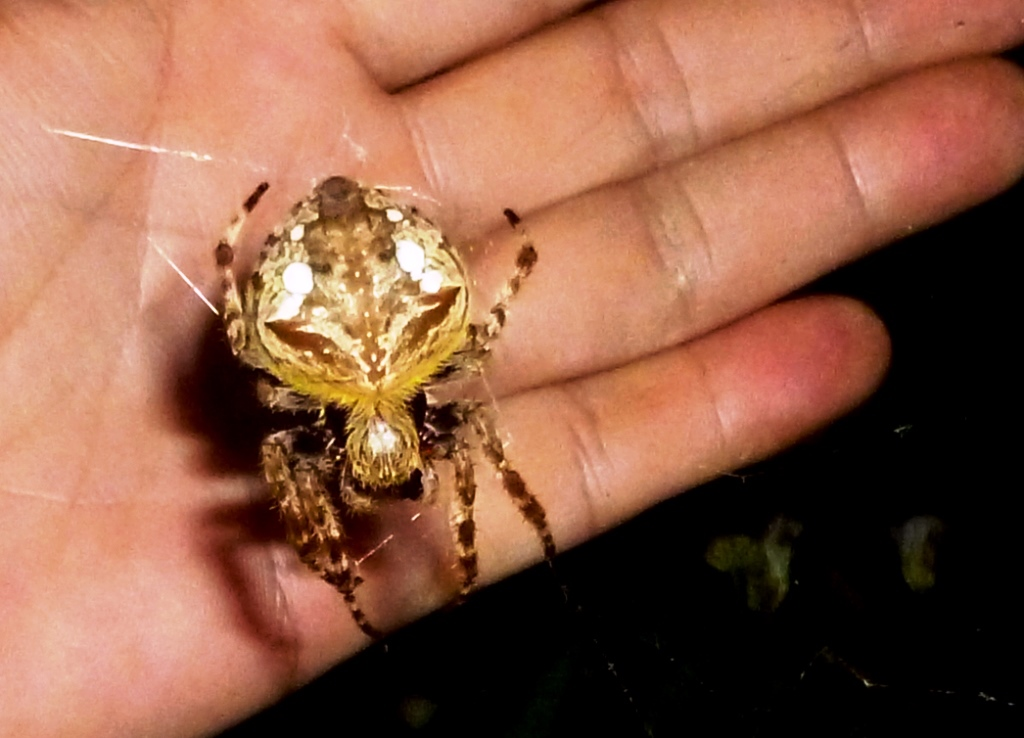
Garden Orb-weaver spider. Cooktown, Australia

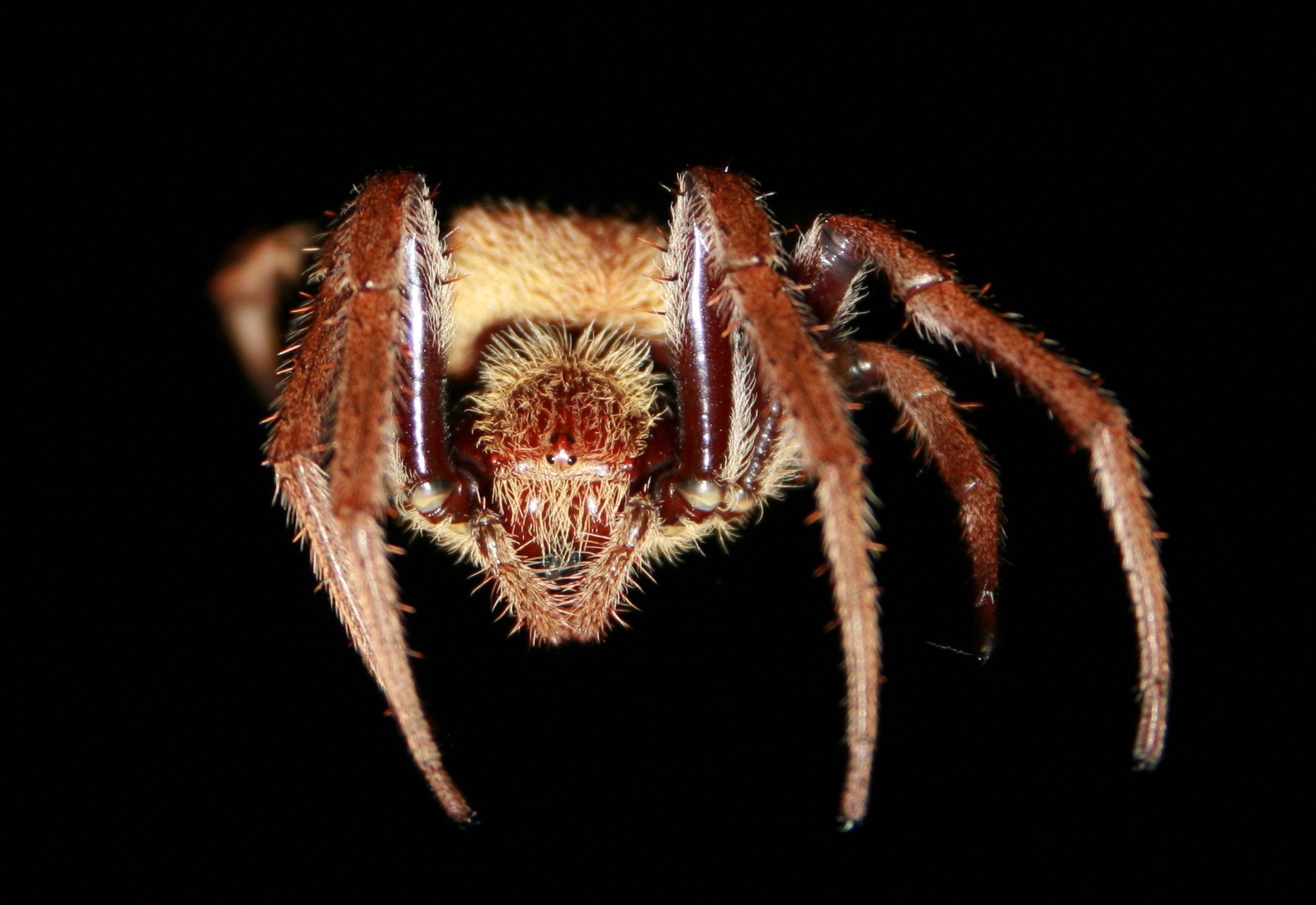
Facial detail

Dorsal and web detail

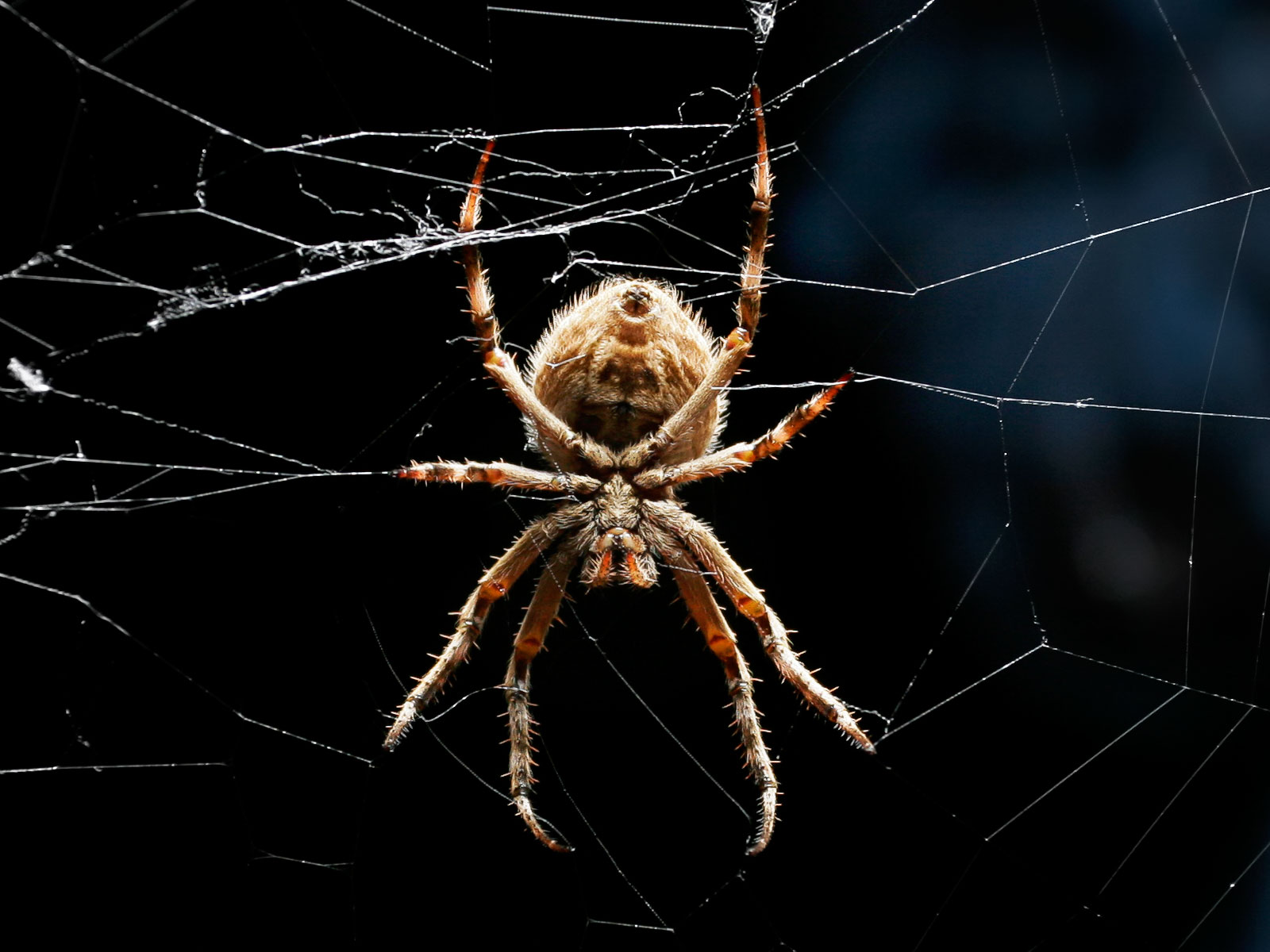
Ventral side

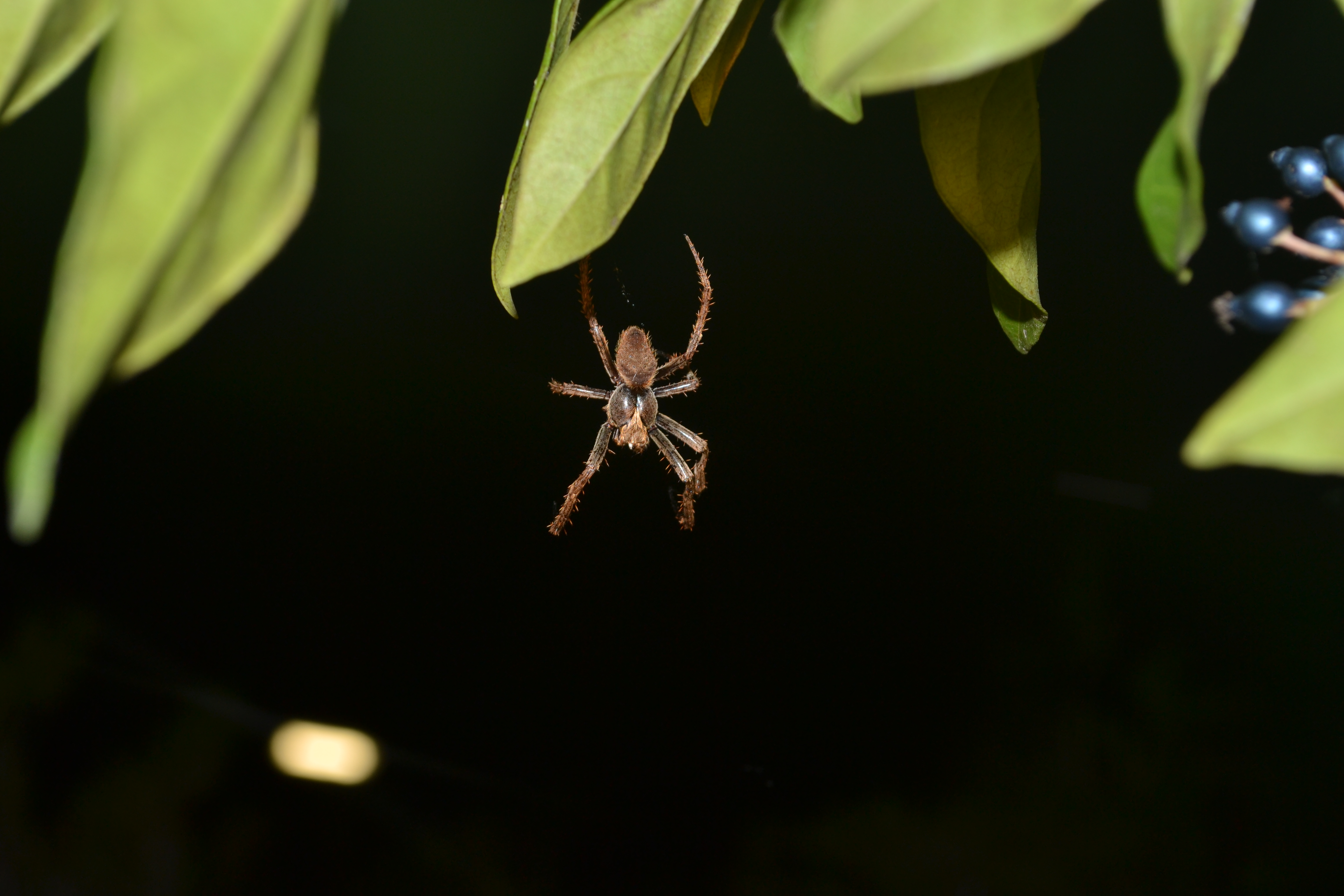
Male

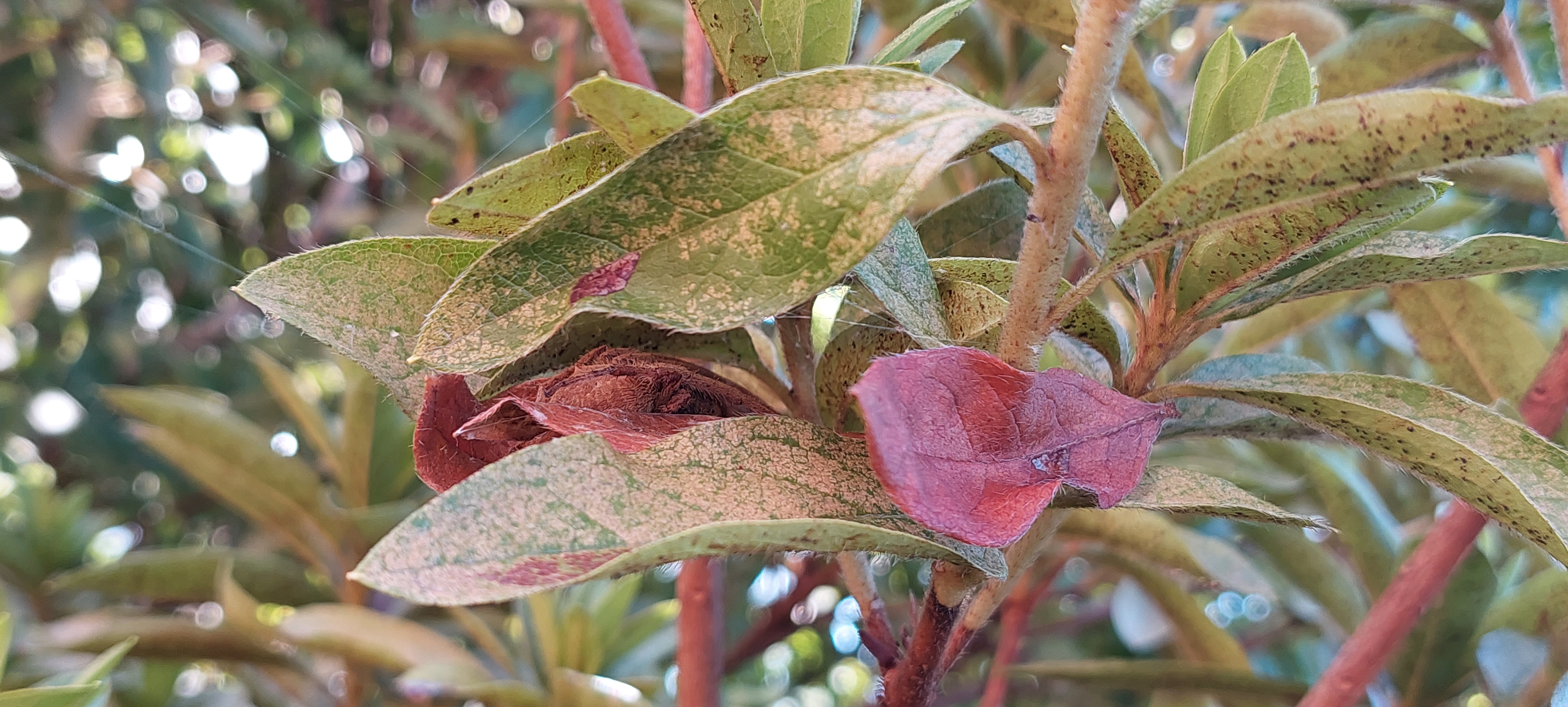
Camouflaged and sleeping in its nest

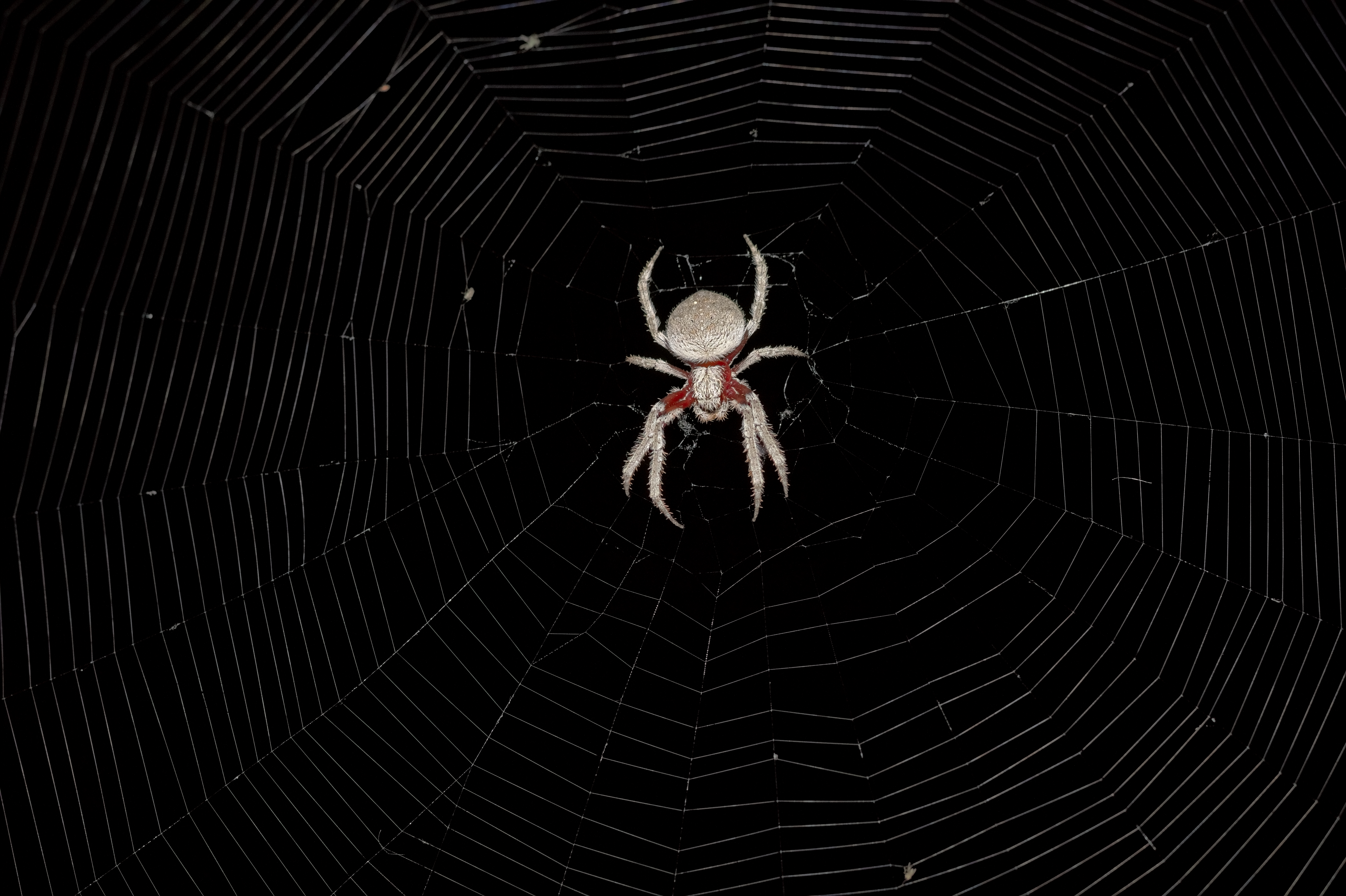
In web at night
