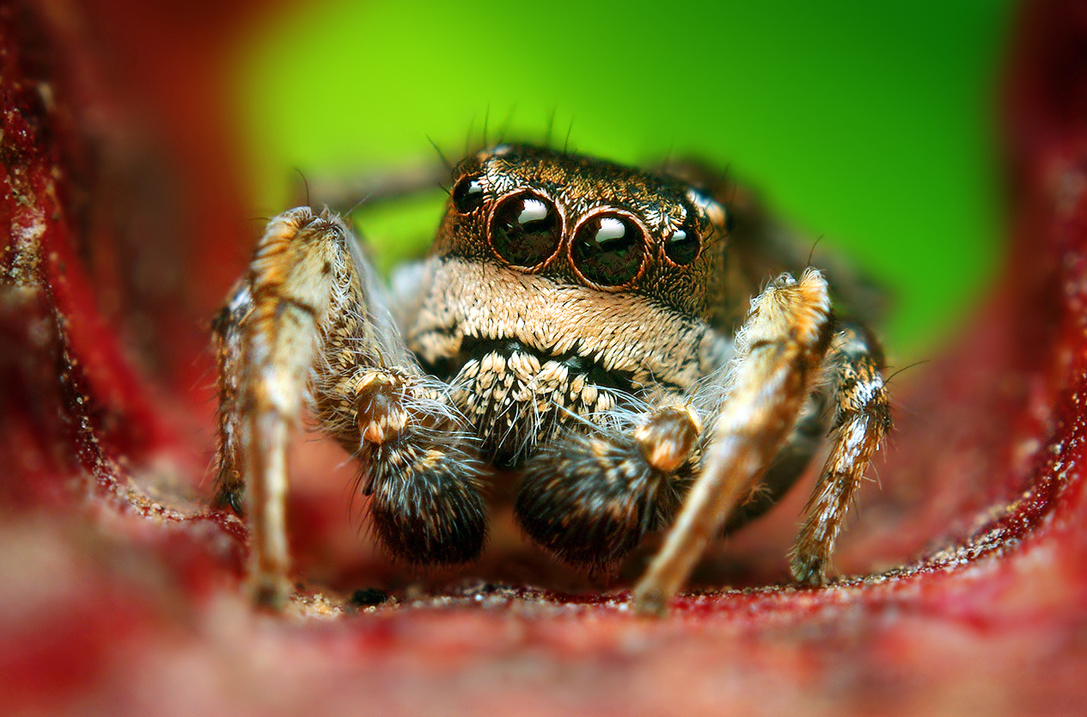

Scientific classification
- Kingdom: Animalia
- Phylum: Arthropoda
- Subphylum: Chelicerata
- Class: Arachnida
- Order: Araneae
- Infraorder: Araneomorphae
- Family: Salticidae
- Genus: Habronattus
- Species: H. cognatus

Binomial name
- Habronattus cognatus (Peckham & Peckham, 1901)

= Habronattus cognatus =

Species of spider

Habronattus cognatus is a species of jumping spider. It is found in North America.

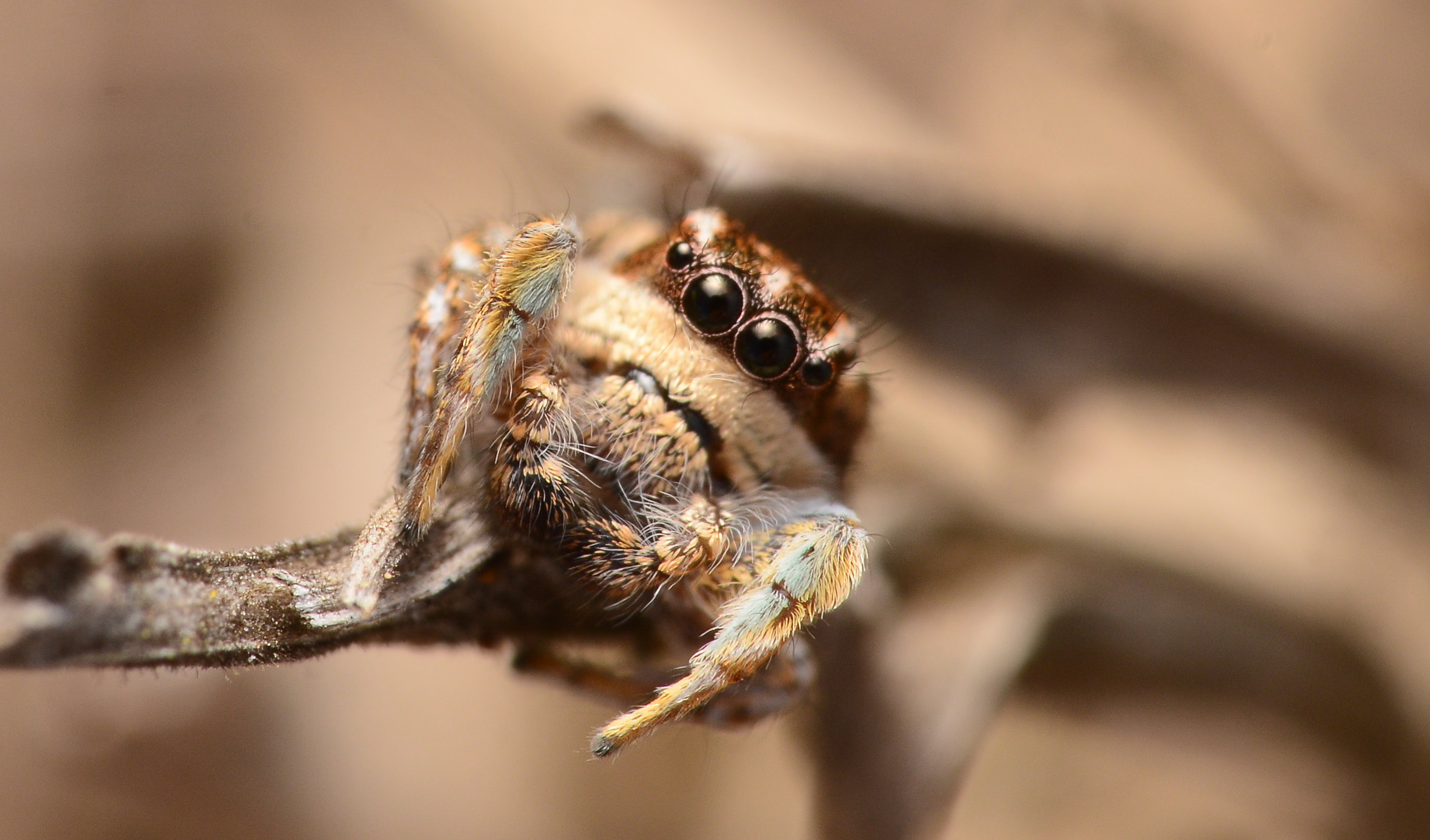
Male face

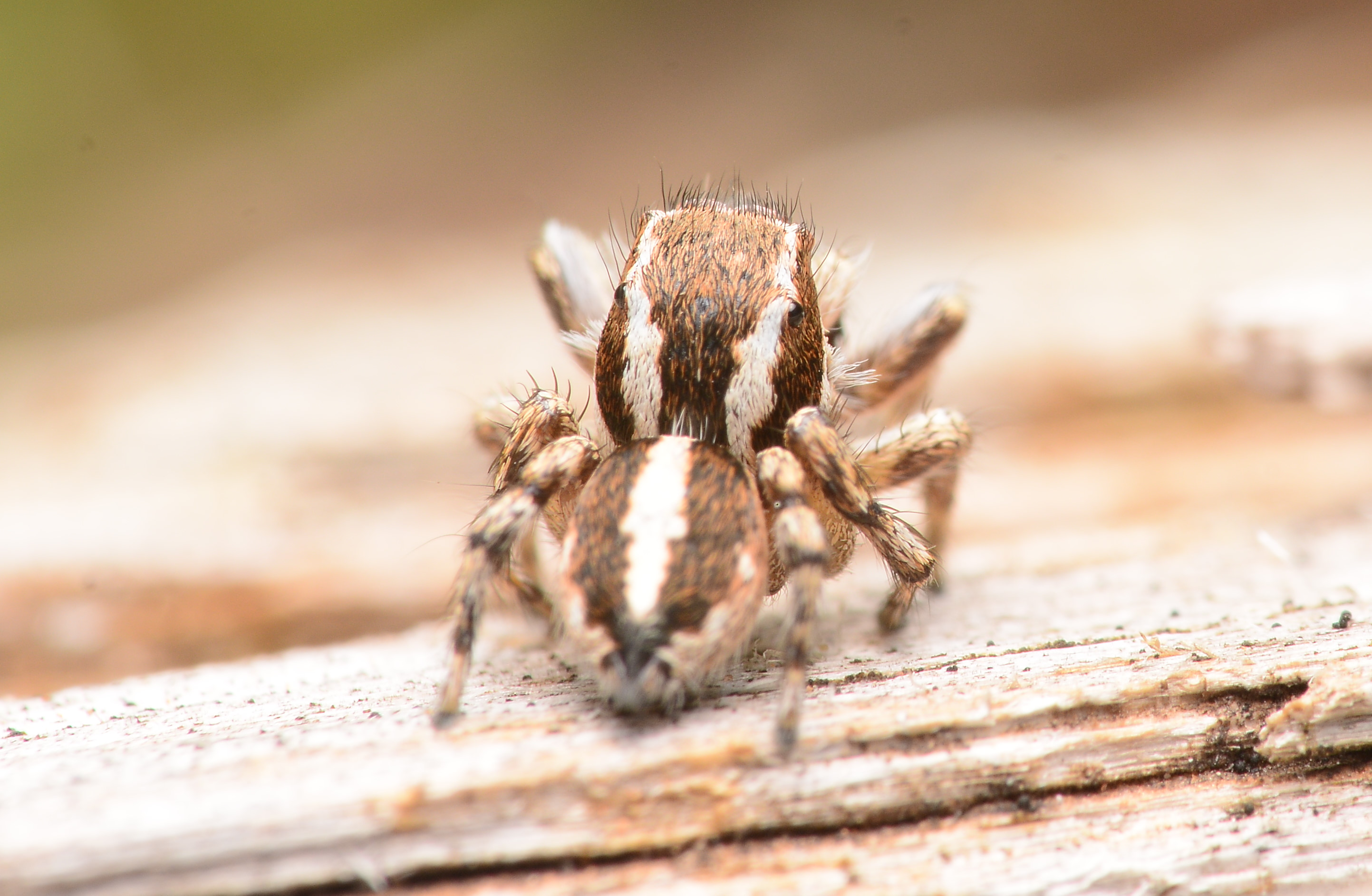
Adult male dorsal

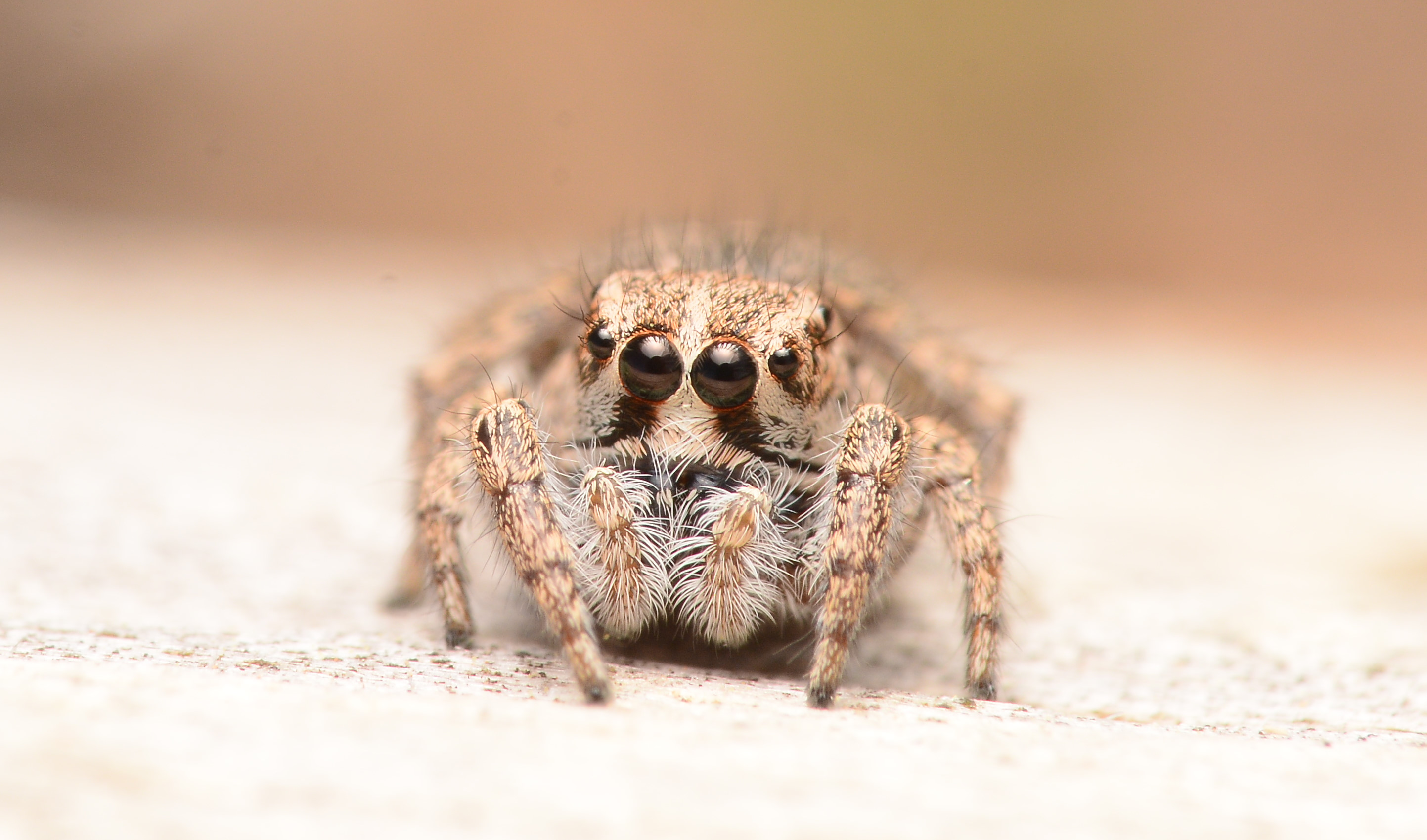
Adult female face

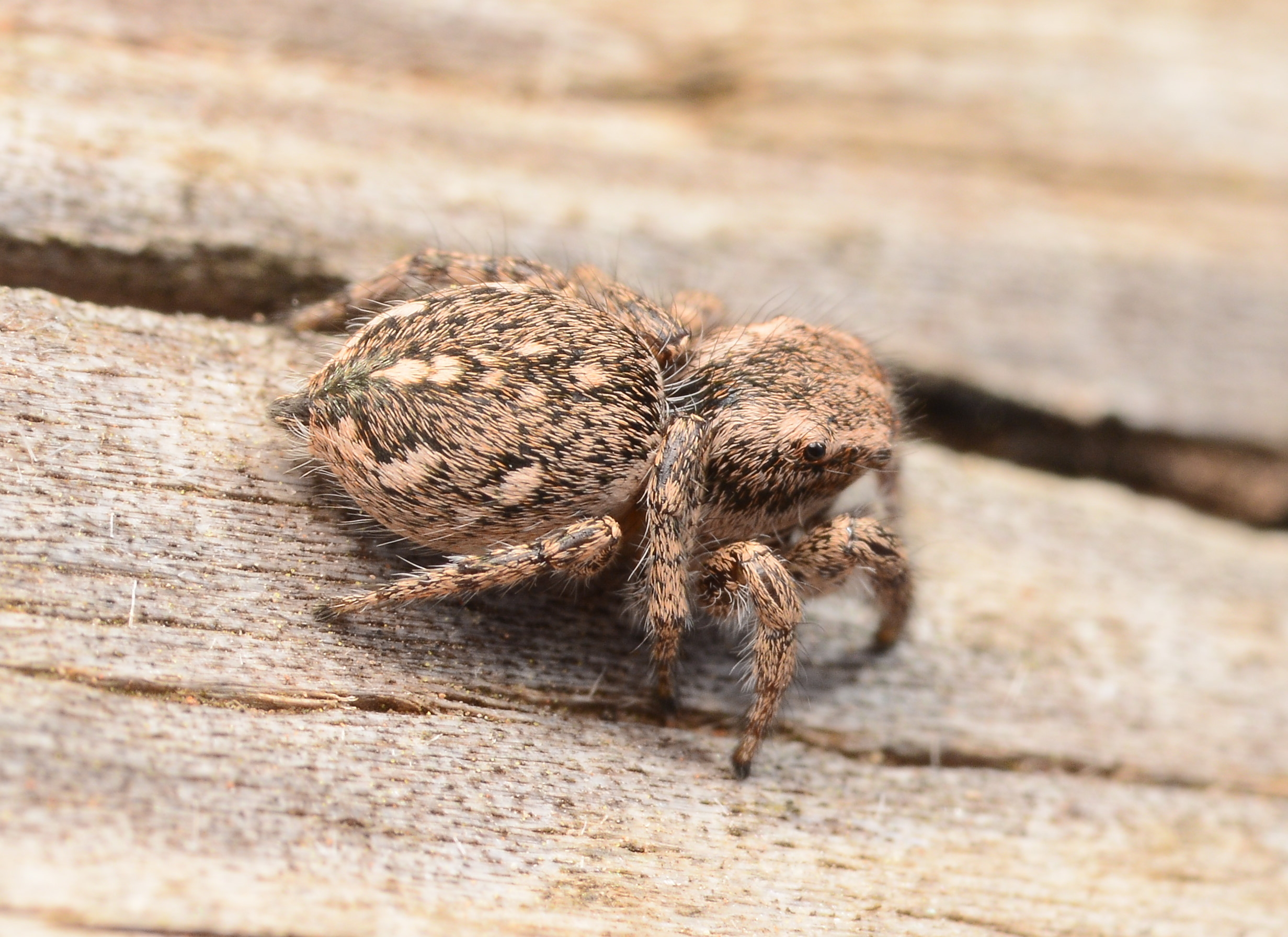
Adult female dorsal
