= Modysticus modestus =

Scientific classification
- Domain: Eukaryota
- Kingdom: Animalia
- Phylum: Arthropoda
- Subphylum: Chelicerata
- Class: Arachnida
- Order: Araneae
- Infraorder: Araneomorphae
- Family: Thomisidae
- Genus: Modysticus
- Species: M. modestus

Binomial name
- Modysticus modestus (Scheffer, 1904)

Species of spider

Modysticus modestus is a species of crab spider in the family Thomisidae. It is found in the United States.
