= Modysticus =

Scientific classification
- Domain: Eukaryota
- Kingdom: Animalia
- Phylum: Arthropoda
- Subphylum: Chelicerata
- Class: Arachnida
- Order: Araneae
- Infraorder: Araneomorphae
- Family: Thomisidae
- Genus: Modysticus; Gertsch

Type species
- Modysticus modestus

Species
- Modysticus floridanus (Banks, 1895); Modysticus imitatus (Gertsch, 1953); Modysticus modestus (Scheffer, 1904); Modysticus okefinokensis (Gertsch, 1934)

Genus of spiders

Modysticus is a genus of spiders in the family Thomisidae. It was first described in 1953 by Gertsch. As of 2017, it contains 4 species found in the U.S. and Mexico.
