= Araneus enucleatus =

Scientific classification
- Kingdom: Animalia
- Phylum: Arthropoda
- Subphylum: Chelicerata
- Class: Arachnida
- Order: Araneae
- Infraorder: Araneomorphae
- Family: Araneidae
- Genus: Araneus
- Species: A. enucleatus

Binomial name
- Araneus enucleatus (Karsch, 1879)

Synonyms
- Epeira enucleata Karsch, 1879; Epeira albertisii Thorell, 1887; Epeira soronis Thorell, 1890; Araneus soronis (Thorell, 1890)

Species of spider

Araneus enucleatus is a species of spider of the genus Araneus. It is found in India, Sri Lanka, Myanmar and Sumatra.
