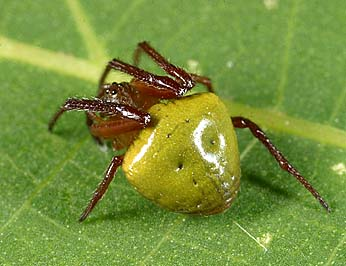

Scientific classification
- Domain: Eukaryota
- Kingdom: Animalia
- Phylum: Arthropoda
- Subphylum: Chelicerata
- Class: Arachnida
- Order: Araneae
- Infraorder: Araneomorphae
- Family: Araneidae
- Genus: Araneus
- Species: A. viridiventris

Binomial name
- Araneus viridiventris Yaginuma, 1969

= Araneus viridiventris =

Species of spider

Araneus viridiventris is a species of spiders described by Takeo Yaginuma in 1969, found in China, Taiwan, India, and Japan. A. viridiventris is included in the genus Araneus in the family Araneidae. No subspecies are listed.
