= Araneus yukon =

Scientific classification
- Domain: Eukaryota
- Kingdom: Animalia
- Phylum: Arthropoda
- Subphylum: Chelicerata
- Class: Arachnida
- Order: Araneae
- Infraorder: Araneomorphae
- Family: Araneidae
- Genus: Araneus
- Species: A. yukon

Binomial name
- Araneus yukon Levi, 1971

Species of spider

Araneus yukon is a species of orb weaver in the spider family Araneidae. It is found in Russia and Canada.
