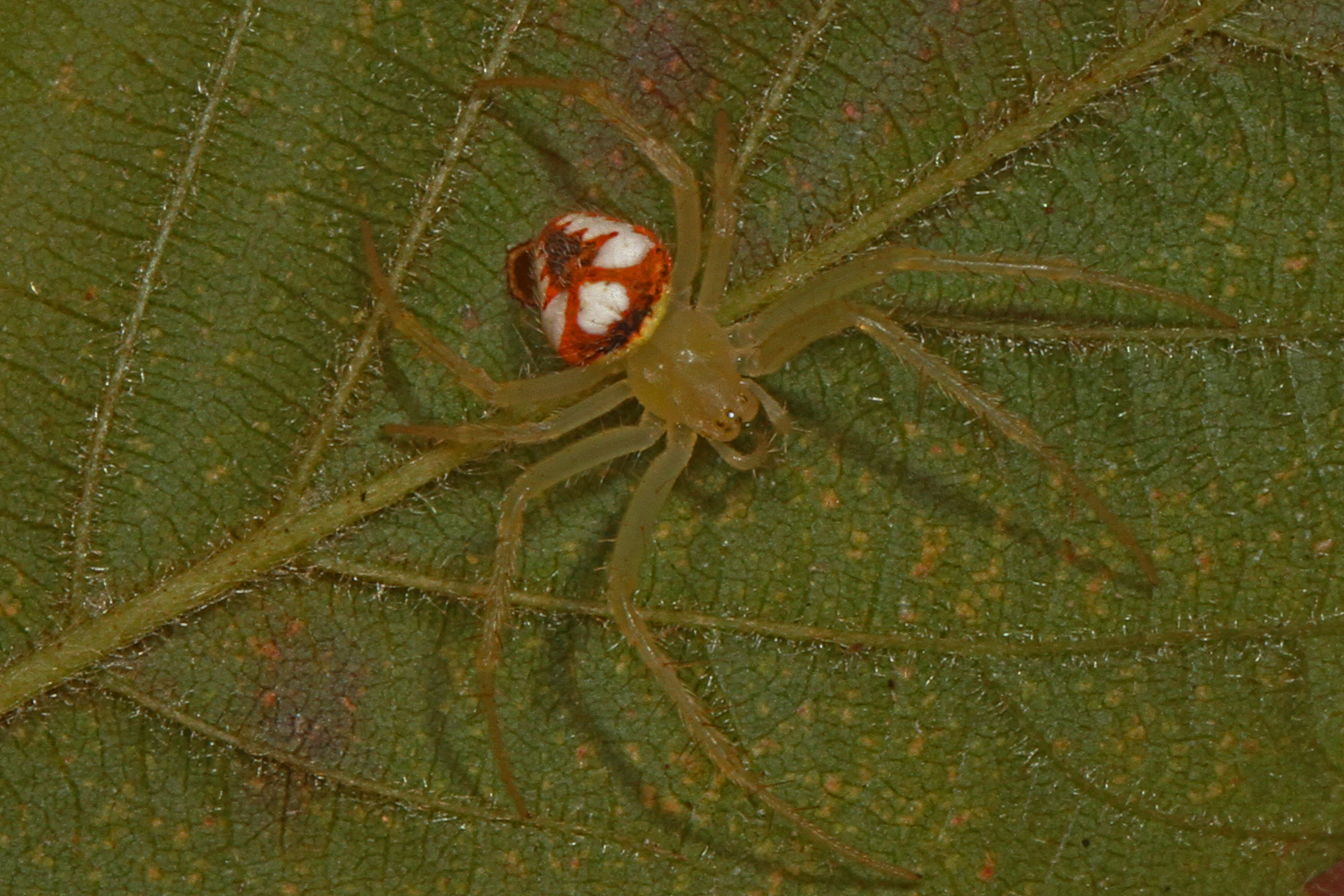

Scientific classification
- Kingdom: Animalia
- Phylum: Arthropoda
- Subphylum: Chelicerata
- Class: Arachnida
- Order: Araneae
- Infraorder: Araneomorphae
- Family: Araneidae
- Genus: Araneus
- Species: A. guttulatus

Binomial name
- Araneus guttulatus (Walckenaer, 1841)

= Araneus guttulatus =

Species of spider

Araneus guttulatus, is a species of orb weaver in the spider family Araneidae. It is found in the Eastern United States, such as Oklahoma and Eastern Canada. The species usually has green legs and cephalothorax whilst the abdomen is often reddish-brown with white marks.
