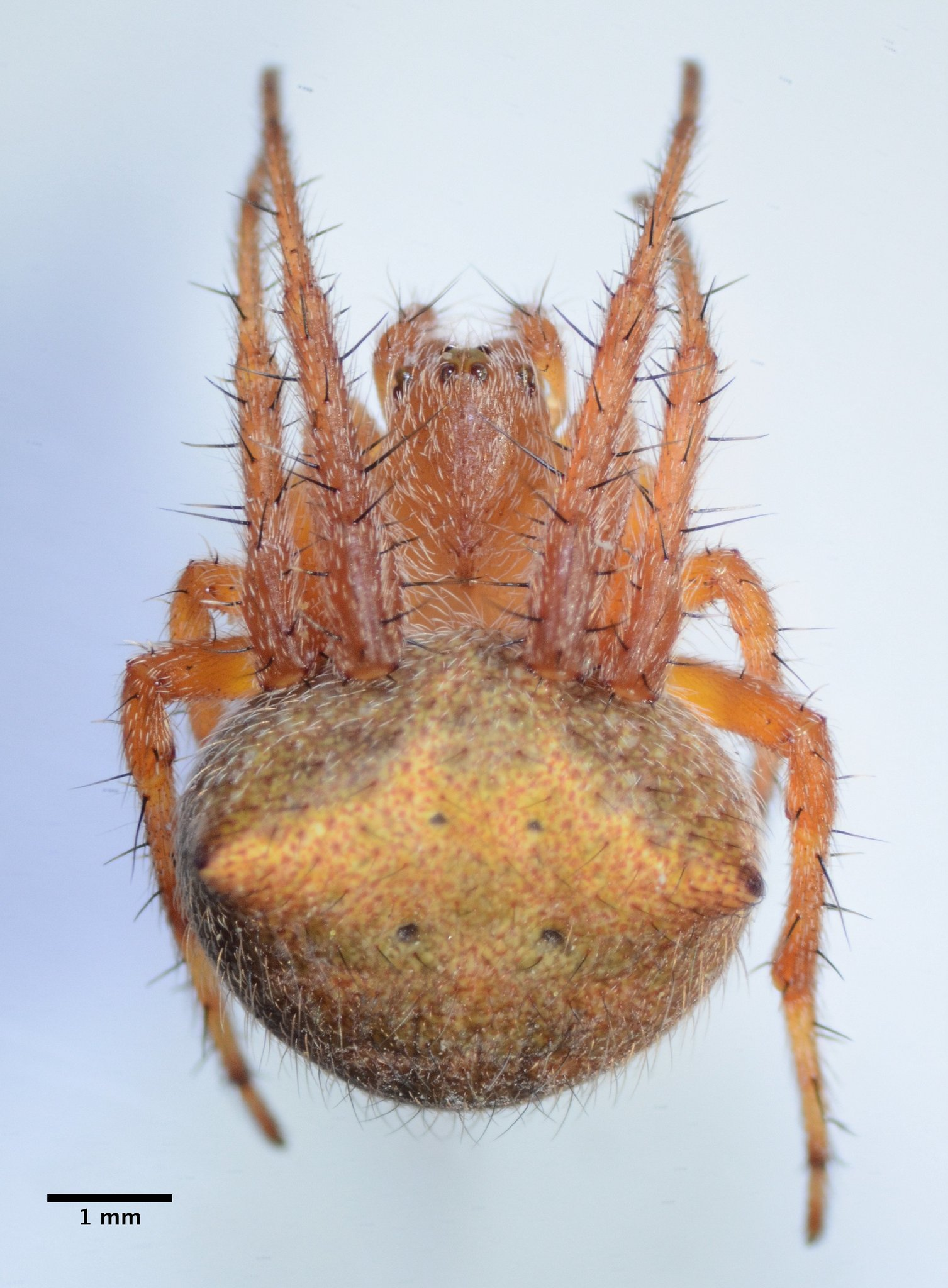

Scientific classification
- Domain: Eukaryota
- Kingdom: Animalia
- Phylum: Arthropoda
- Subphylum: Chelicerata
- Class: Arachnida
- Order: Araneae
- Infraorder: Araneomorphae
- Family: Araneidae
- Genus: Araneus
- Species: A. bispinosus

Binomial name
- Araneus bispinosus (Keyserling, 1885)

= Araneus bispinosus =

Species of spider

Araneus bispinosus is a species of orb weaver in the spider family Araneidae. It is found in the United States.
