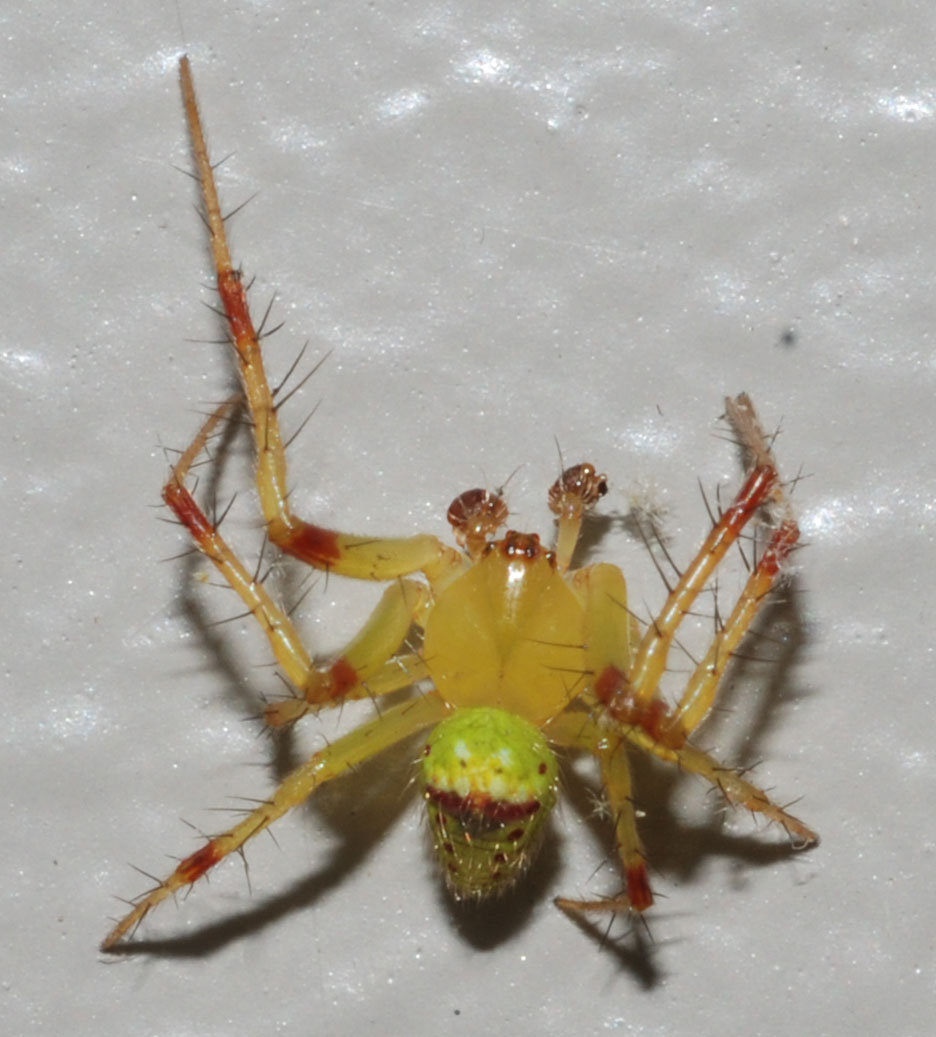

Scientific classification
- Domain: Eukaryota
- Kingdom: Animalia
- Phylum: Arthropoda
- Subphylum: Chelicerata
- Class: Arachnida
- Order: Araneae
- Infraorder: Araneomorphae
- Family: Araneidae
- Genus: Araneus
- Species: A. bonsallae

Binomial name
- Araneus bonsallae (McCook, 1894)

= Araneus bonsallae =

Species of spider

Araneus bonsallae is a species of orb weaver in the spider family Araneidae. It is found in the United States, particularly north-central Texas, as of 1984.
