= Araneus asiaticus =

Scientific classification
- Domain: Eukaryota
- Kingdom: Animalia
- Phylum: Arthropoda
- Subphylum: Chelicerata
- Class: Arachnida
- Order: Araneae
- Infraorder: Araneomorphae
- Family: Araneidae
- Genus: Araneus
- Species: A. asiaticus

Binomial name
- Araneus asiaticus Bakhvalov, 1983

Species of spider

Araneus asiaticus is a spider in the genus Araneus, found in Kyrgyzstan.
