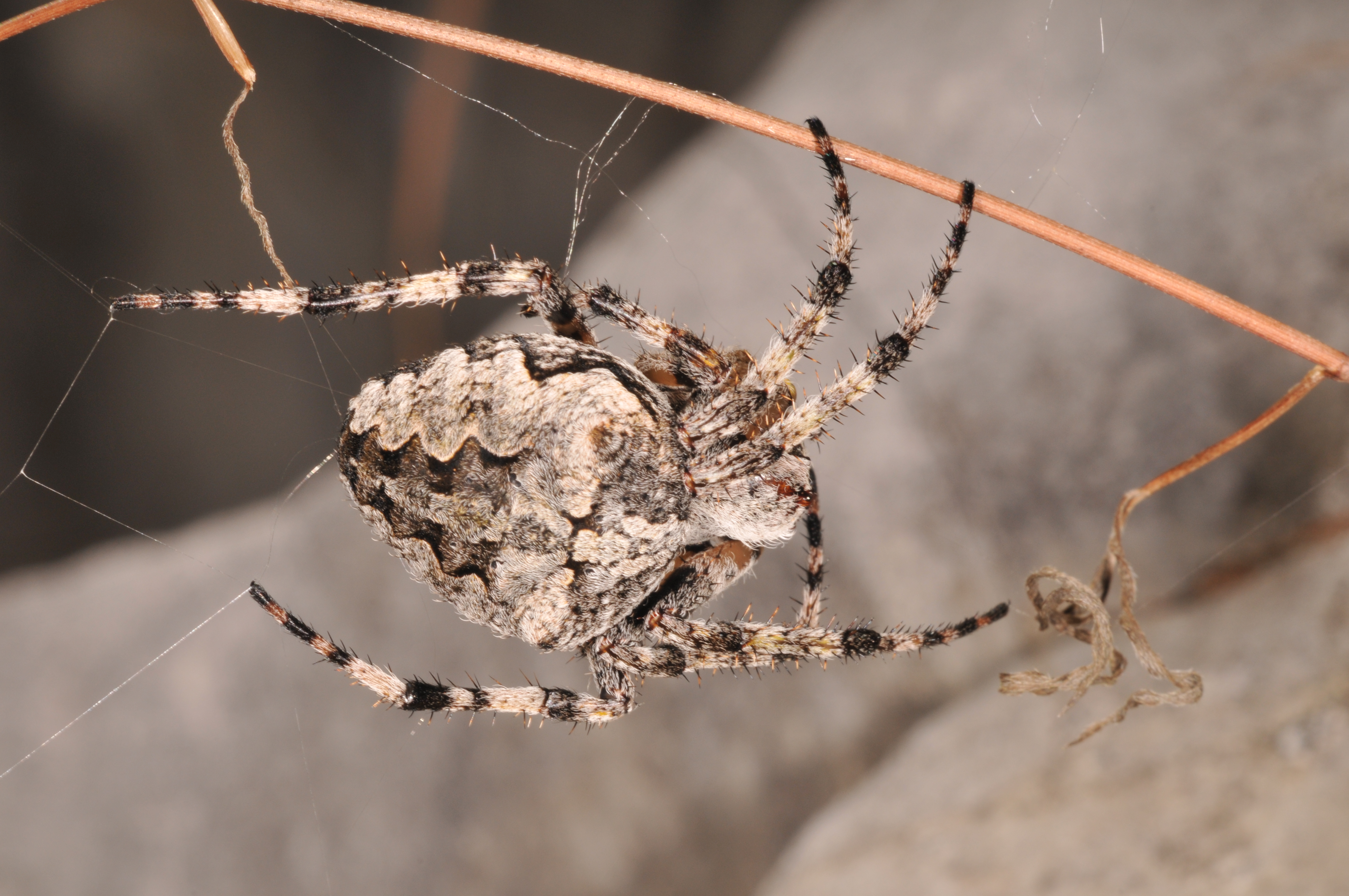
- Araneus circe, 26 mm, Croatia

Scientific classification
- Kingdom: Animalia
- Phylum: Arthropoda
- Subphylum: Chelicerata
- Class: Arachnida
- Order: Araneae
- Infraorder: Araneomorphae
- Family: Araneidae
- Genus: Araneus
- Species: A. circe

Binomial name
- Araneus circe (Audouin, 1826)

Subspecies
- Araneus circe circe (Audouin, 1826); Araneus circe strandi (Kolosvary, 1935) — Hungary

= Araneus circe =

Species of spider

Araneus circe is an orb-weaving spider species with a Palearctic distribution.
