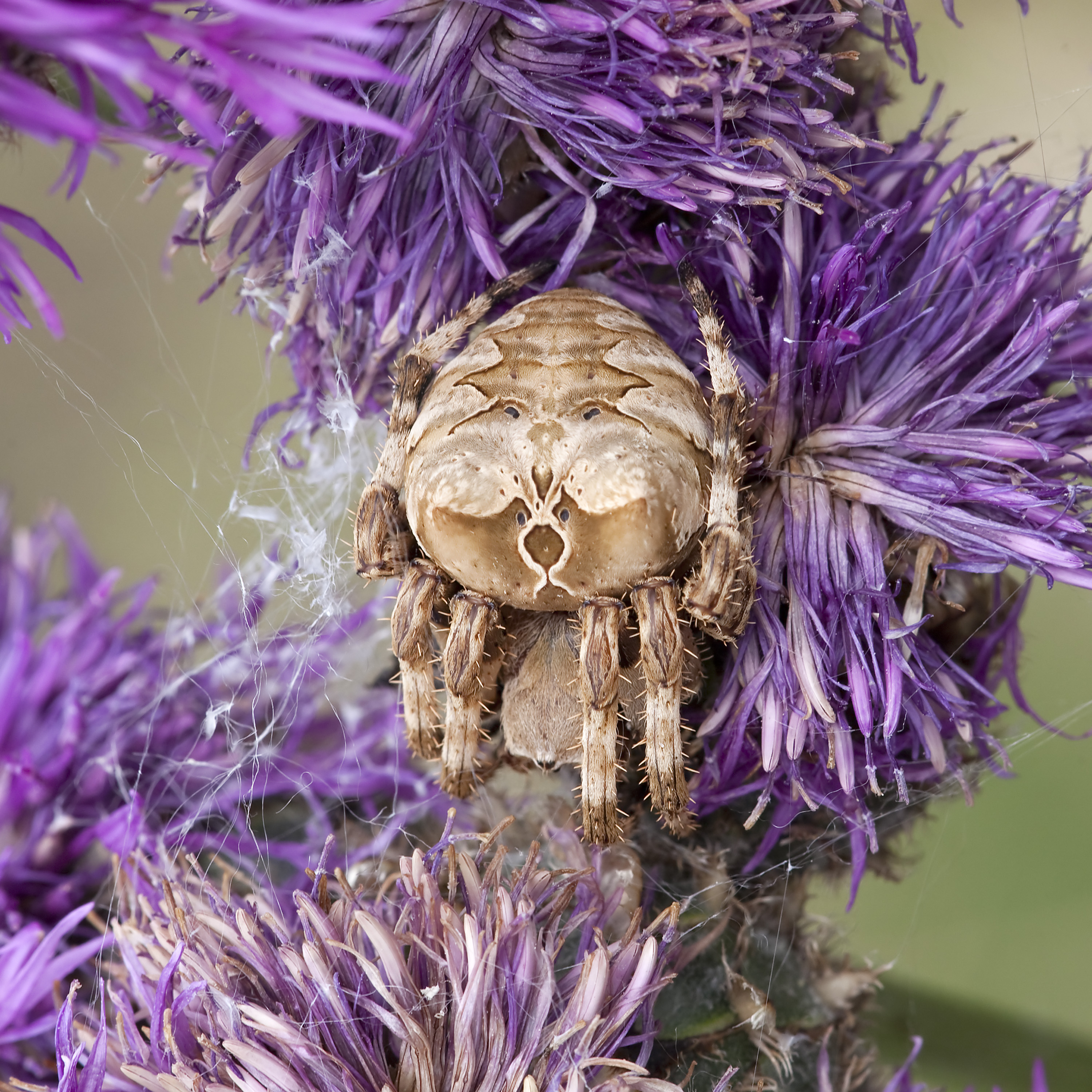
- Female

Scientific classification
- Kingdom: Animalia
- Phylum: Arthropoda
- Subphylum: Chelicerata
- Class: Arachnida
- Order: Araneae
- Infraorder: Araneomorphae
- Family: Araneidae
- Genus: Araneus
- Species: A. grossus

Binomial name
- Araneus grossus C. L. Koch, 1844

= Araneus grossus =

Species of spider

Araneus grossus is a orb-weaver spider species. The species is one of the largest orb-weaver spiders in Europe. It is found in South and Southeast Europe and Central Asia.

== Size and markings ==
Individual spiders are much bigger and stronger than the European garden spider (Araneus diadematus). Adult females range in length from 15 to 23 mm, while males range about 11 mm.

The front-body (Prosoma) is brown with a lighter edge. The yellowish eye area is densely haired. The sternum is yellowish brown with darker margins. The legs are brown and vaguely annulated. The abdomen (Opisthosoma) is bulged on the upper side at the two front corners. Dorsally on a light brown ground it has a dark brown pattern at the back. The tubercles are yellowish.

== Range ==
A. grossus has a holarctic distribution, found in North (UK), South and Southeast Europe and Central Asia; it seems to be rarer in central Europe.

The habitat of this spider is the herbaceous layer. It lives on bushes at warm, sunny locations.
