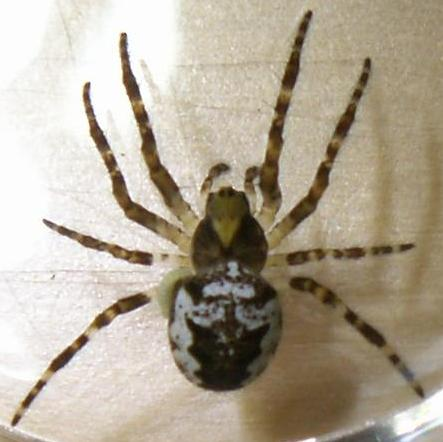

Conservation status
- Secure (NatureServe)

Scientific classification
- Kingdom: Animalia
- Phylum: Arthropoda
- Subphylum: Chelicerata
- Class: Arachnida
- Order: Araneae
- Infraorder: Araneomorphae
- Family: Araneidae
- Genus: Araneus
- Species: A. nordmanni

Binomial name
- Araneus nordmanni (Thorell, 1870)

= Araneus nordmanni =

Species of spider

Araneus nordmanni is a species of orb weaver in the spider family Araneidae. It is found in North America, Europe, Caucasus, a range from Russia to Kazakhstan, Korea, and Japan.
