= Araneus pallidus =

Scientific classification
- Kingdom: Animalia
- Phylum: Arthropoda
- Subphylum: Chelicerata
- Class: Arachnida
- Order: Araneae
- Infraorder: Araneomorphae
- Family: Araneidae
- Genus: Araneus
- Species: A. pallidus

Binomial name
- Araneus pallidus (Olivier, 1789)

Species of spider

Araneus pallidus is an orb-weaving spider found in Southwest Europe (Portugal, Spain, France) and Northwest Africa (Algeria).
