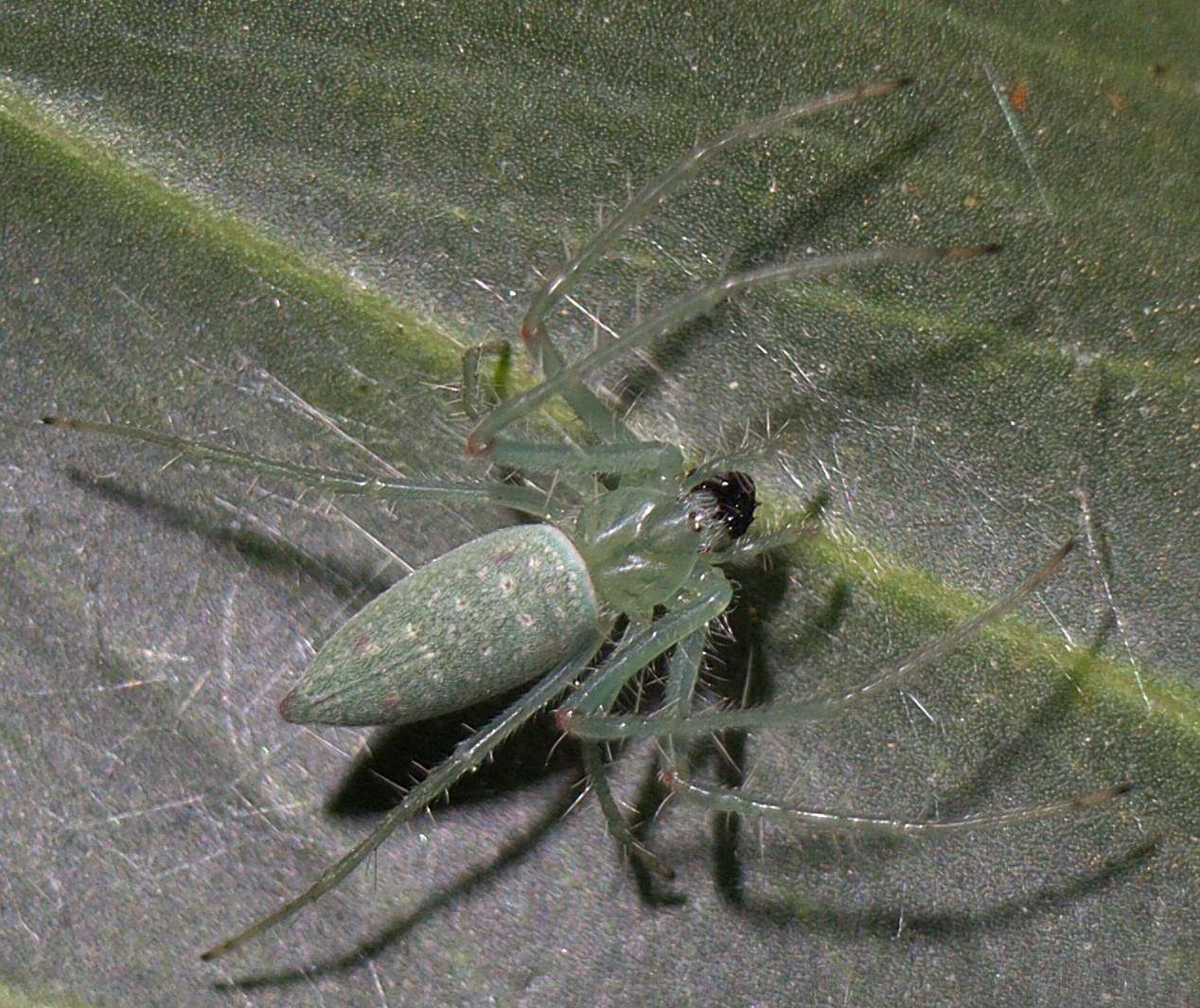

Scientific classification
- Domain: Eukaryota
- Kingdom: Animalia
- Phylum: Arthropoda
- Subphylum: Chelicerata
- Class: Arachnida
- Order: Araneae
- Infraorder: Araneomorphae
- Family: Araneidae
- Genus: Araneus
- Species: A. talipedatus

Binomial name
- Araneus talipedatus (Keyserling, 1887)

= Araneus talipedatus =

Slender green orb-weaver spider

Species of spider

Araneus talipedatus the slender green orb-weaver spider is a species of orb weaver in the family Araneidae. Found in many parts of Australia, this species is active in daytime and builds a conventional orb web. The female has a body length of up to 9 mm, males to 7 mm. Long hairs grow on the legs and pedipalps.
