= Araneus strupifer =

Araneus Hairy Field Spider

Conservation status
- Least Concern (SANBI Red List)

Scientific classification
- Kingdom: Animalia
- Phylum: Arthropoda
- Subphylum: Chelicerata
- Class: Arachnida
- Order: Araneae
- Infraorder: Araneomorphae
- Family: Araneidae
- Genus: Araneus
- Species: A. strupifer

Binomial name
- Araneus strupifer (Simon, 1886)

Species of spider

Araneus strupifer is a species of spider in the family Araneidae. It is found from Senegal to South Africa.

== Distribution ==
Araneus strupifer is known from Botswana, Senegal, Tanzania, Kenya, and South Africa. In South Africa, the species occurs in three provinces at altitudes ranging from 44 to 1,341 m above sea level. The species is possibly under-collected and suspected to occur in African countries in between its known distribution.

== Habitat and ecology ==
This orb-web spider constructs its web at night. The species is known from the Thicket, Indian Ocean Coastal Belt, and Savanna biomes.

== Description ==
The species is known only from female specimens.

== Conservation ==
Araneus strupifer is listed as Least Concern by the South African National Biodiversity Institute due to its wide geographical range. The species is protected in Kruger National Park and Lhuvhondo Nature Reserve.

== Taxonomy ==
The species was originally described from Dakar, Senegal, as Epeira strupifera by Eugène Simon in 1886. The species has not been revised and identification of the male is still problematic.
