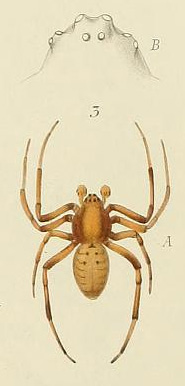
- diagnostic drawing of male from original description

Scientific classification
- Kingdom: Animalia
- Phylum: Arthropoda
- Subphylum: Chelicerata
- Class: Arachnida
- Order: Araneae
- Infraorder: Araneomorphae
- Family: Araneidae
- Genus: Araneus
- Species: A. sagicola

Binomial name
- Araneus sagicola (Dönitz & Strand, 1906)

Synonyms
- Aranea sagicola Dönitz & Strand, in Bösenberg & Strand, 1906

= Araneus sagicola =

Species of spider

Araneus sagicola is a species of orb weaver spider in the family Araneidae. It is endemic to Japan. This species is only known from the males that have been described in 1906.

== Etymology ==
The specific epithet sagicola is of uncertain etymology.

== Distribution ==
A. sagicola has been recorded from Japan.

== Description ==
The original description from 1906 indicates that specimens reach a length of 11 mm, with the cephalothorax measuring 5.1 by 4.3 mm at its widest point between legs II. The cephalothorax shows strong anterior extension behind the eye region and is reddish-brown with darker lateral fields. The sternum is dark brown.

In all examined specimens, the dorsal markings of the generally greyish-brown opisthosoma are not clearly defined. Immature specimens show a small, dark reddish-brown longitudinal stripe at the base that forks posteriorly. A yellowish spot appears anterior to each posterior lateral projection. The subsequent depressed points lie each in a velvet, dark reddish-brown transverse stripe.

These stripes connect laterally and form a pyramid bordered by a fine light stripe. Medially they are separated by lighter stripes. A light stripe runs along the middle, ending at the last quarter of the abdominal length, while further forward it takes up several small dark longitudinal stripes. On the sides alternate dark and light oblique stripes. On the abdomen are one or two pairs of yellow points next to the dark median field.

All leg segments are light at the base and dark brown at the ends.
