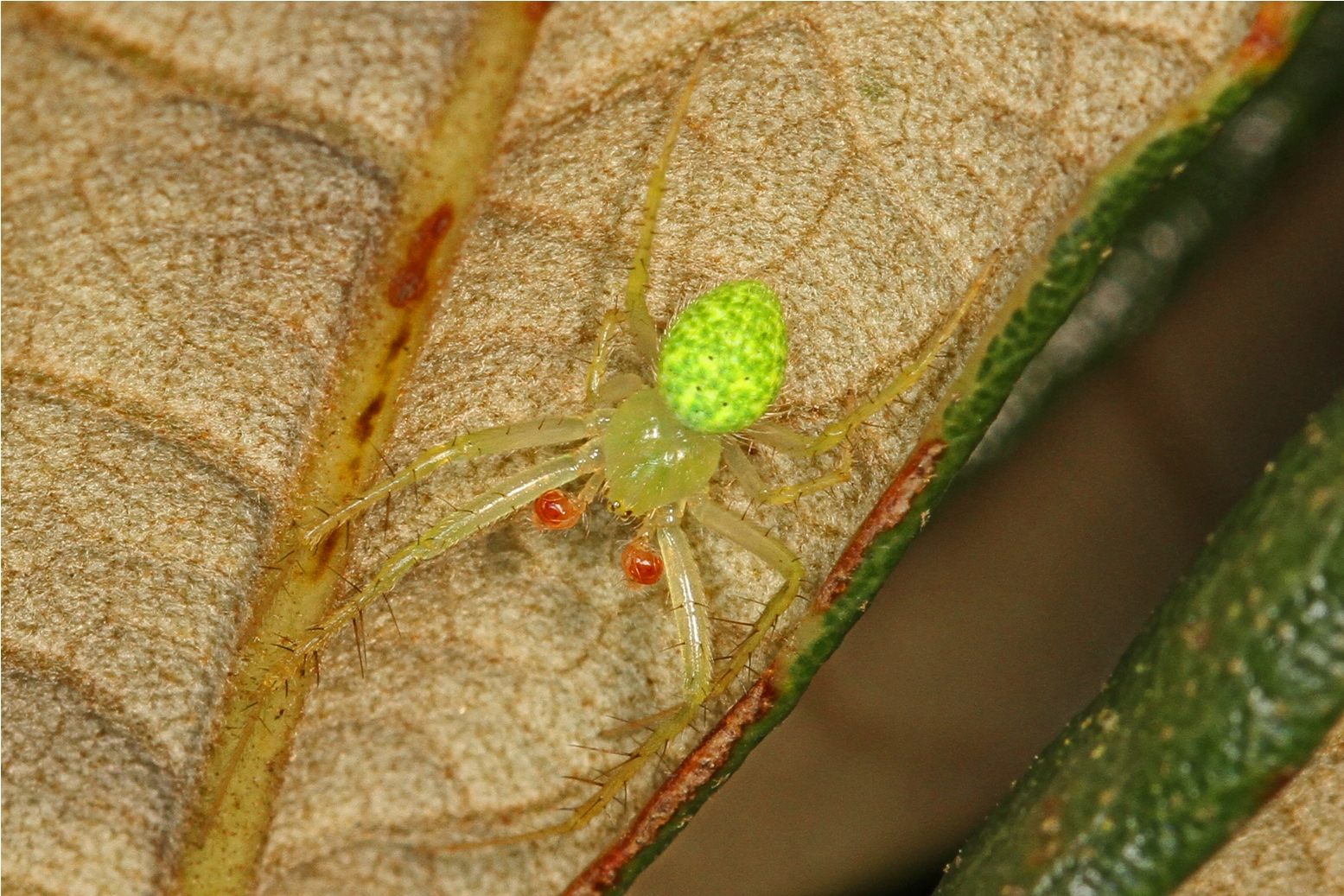

Scientific classification
- Kingdom: Animalia
- Phylum: Arthropoda
- Subphylum: Chelicerata
- Class: Arachnida
- Order: Araneae
- Infraorder: Araneomorphae
- Family: Araneidae
- Genus: Araneus
- Species: A. juniperi

Binomial name
- Araneus juniperi (Emerton, 1884)

= Araneus juniperi =

Species of spider

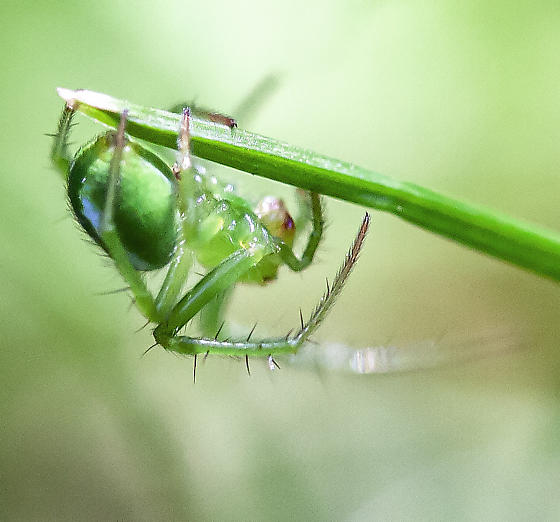
Lateral view

Araneus juniperi is a species of spider in the orb weaver family (Araneidae). It is found in the US and Canada.
