= Araneus varus =

Scientific classification
- Kingdom: Animalia
- Phylum: Arthropoda
- Subphylum: Chelicerata
- Class: Arachnida
- Order: Araneae
- Infraorder: Araneomorphae
- Family: Araneidae
- Genus: Araneus
- Species: A. varus

Binomial name
- Araneus varus (Kauri, 1950)

Synonyms
- Larinia vara Kauri, 1950

Species of spider

Araneus varus is a species of spider in the family Araneidae. It is endemic to South Africa.

== Distribution ==
Araneus varus is known only from Pietermaritzburg in KwaZulu-Natal, at an altitude of 857 m above sea level.

== Habitat and ecology ==
This orb-web spider constructs an orb-web in low vegetation and grasses in the Savanna biome.

== Description ==
Due to sexual dimorphism, it is difficult to recognize the two sexes as belonging to the same species.

== Conservation ==
Araneus varus is listed as Data Deficient for Taxonomic reasons.

== Taxonomy ==
The species was originally described by Hans Kauri in 1950 as Larinia vara from Pietermaritzburg. The species was redescribed by Yuri Marusik in 2017, who transferred it to Araneus. The species is known only from the male and identification of the female is still problematic.
