= Araneus svanetiensis =

Scientific classification
- Kingdom: Animalia
- Phylum: Arthropoda
- Subphylum: Chelicerata
- Class: Arachnida
- Order: Araneae
- Infraorder: Araneomorphae
- Family: Araneidae
- Genus: Araneus
- Species: A. svanetiensis

Binomial name
- Araneus svanetiensis Mcheidze, 1997

Species of spider

Araneus svanetiensis is an orb-weaver spider found in Georgia.
