= Araneus gadus =

Scientific classification
- Domain: Eukaryota
- Kingdom: Animalia
- Phylum: Arthropoda
- Subphylum: Chelicerata
- Class: Arachnida
- Order: Araneae
- Infraorder: Araneomorphae
- Family: Araneidae
- Genus: Araneus
- Species: A. gadus

Binomial name
- Araneus gadus Levi, 1973

Species of spider

Araneus gadus is a species of orb weaver in the spider family Araneidae. It is found in the United States. The scientific name of the species was first validly published in 1973 by Herbert Walter Levi.
