= Araneus corticarius =

Conservation status
- Secure (NatureServe)

Scientific classification
- Kingdom: Animalia
- Phylum: Arthropoda
- Subphylum: Chelicerata
- Class: Arachnida
- Order: Araneae
- Infraorder: Araneomorphae
- Family: Araneidae
- Genus: Araneus
- Species: A. corticarius

Binomial name
- Araneus corticarius (Emerton, 1884)

Species of spider

Araneus corticarius is a species of orb weaver in the spider family Araneidae. It is found in the United States and Canada.
