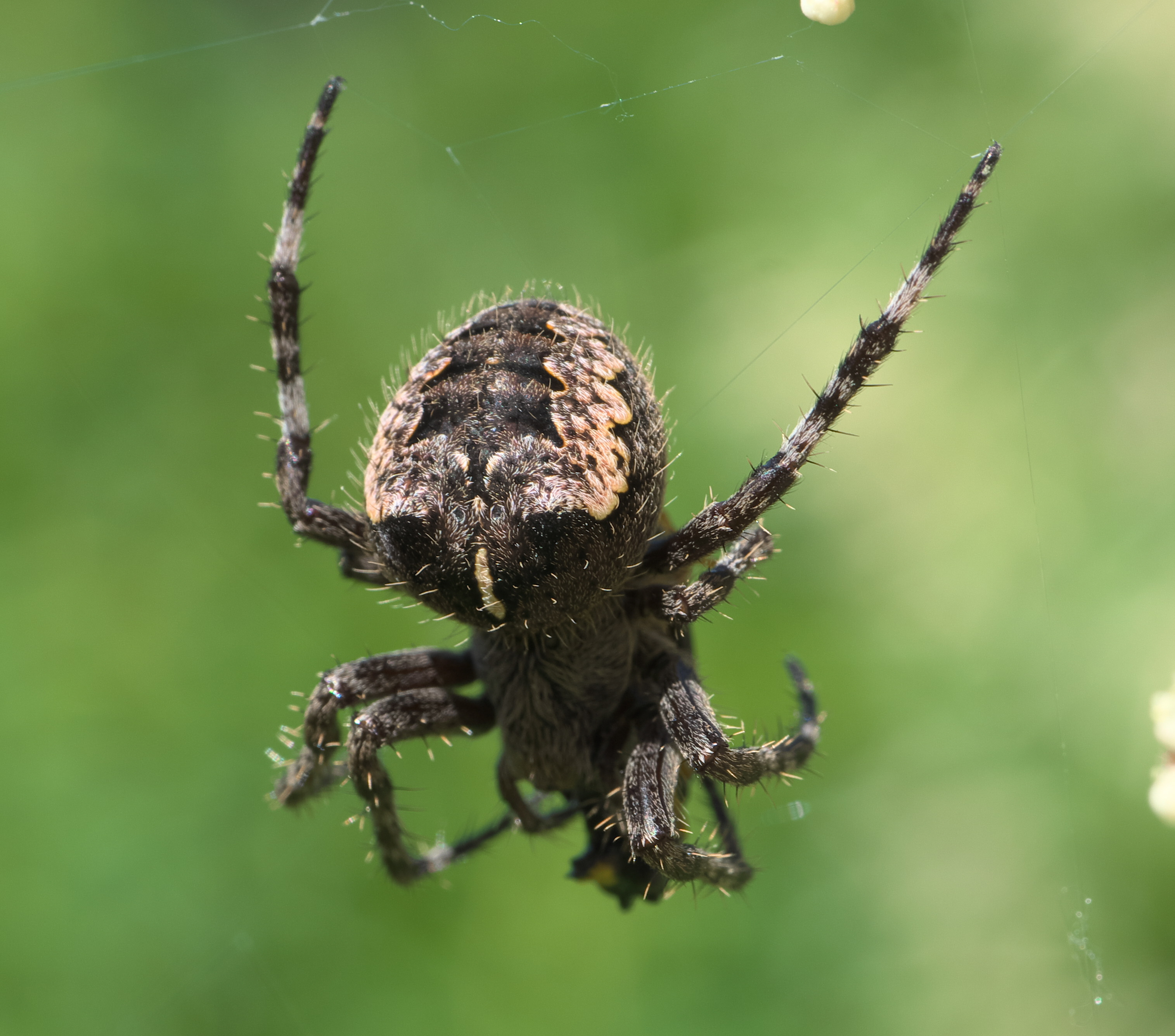

Conservation status
- Secure (NatureServe)

Scientific classification
- Kingdom: Animalia
- Phylum: Arthropoda
- Subphylum: Chelicerata
- Class: Arachnida
- Order: Araneae
- Infraorder: Araneomorphae
- Family: Araneidae
- Genus: Araneus
- Species: A. saevus

Binomial name
- Araneus saevus (L. Koch, 1872)

= Araneus saevus =

Species of spider

Araneus saevus is a species of orb weaver in the spider family Araneidae. It is found in North America, Europe, and Russia (Far East).
