= Araneus graemii =

Scientific classification
- Kingdom: Animalia
- Phylum: Arthropoda
- Subphylum: Chelicerata
- Class: Arachnida
- Order: Araneae
- Infraorder: Araneomorphae
- Family: Araneidae
- Genus: Araneus
- Species: A. graemii

Binomial name
- Araneus graemii Pocock, 1900

Species of spider

Araneus graemii is a species of spider in the family Araneidae. It is endemic to the Eastern Cape of South Africa.

== Distribution ==
Araneus graemii is known only from Grahamstown in the Eastern Cape, at an altitude of 552 m above sea level.

== Habitat and ecology ==
This orb-web spider is known from the Thicket biome. Nothing more is known about their behaviour.

== Conservation ==
Araneus graemii is listed as Data Deficient for Taxonomic reasons. Too little is known about the location, habitat and range of this taxon for a full assessment to be made. Identification of the species is problematic.

== Taxonomy ==
The species was described by Reginald Innes Pocock in 1900 from Grahamstown. The species is based only on a female specimen, and identification of both sexes is still problematic.
