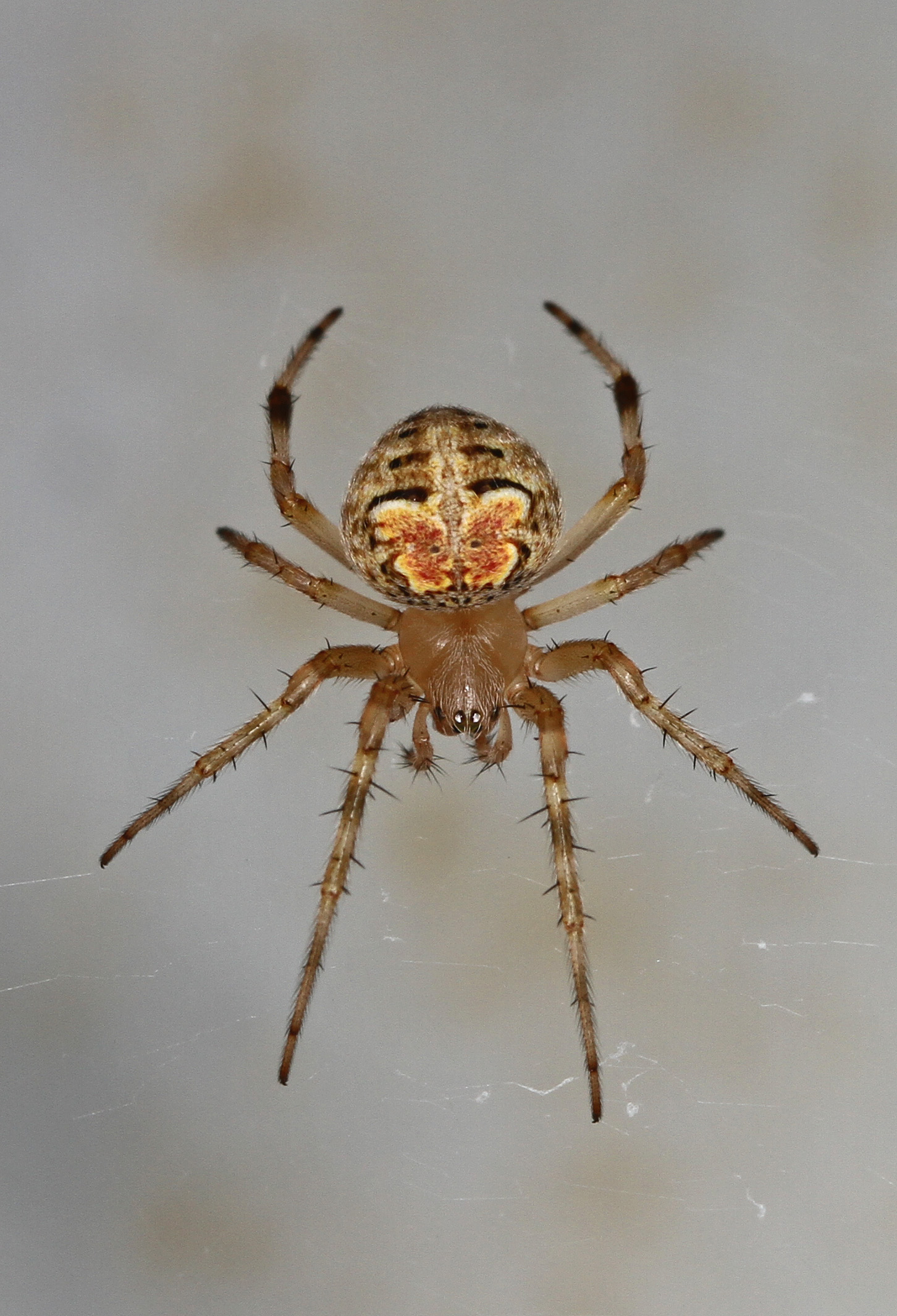

Scientific classification
- Domain: Eukaryota
- Kingdom: Animalia
- Phylum: Arthropoda
- Subphylum: Chelicerata
- Class: Arachnida
- Order: Araneae
- Infraorder: Araneomorphae
- Family: Araneidae
- Genus: Araneus
- Species: A. pegnia

Binomial name
- Araneus pegnia (Walckenaer, 1841)

= Araneus pegnia =

Species of spider

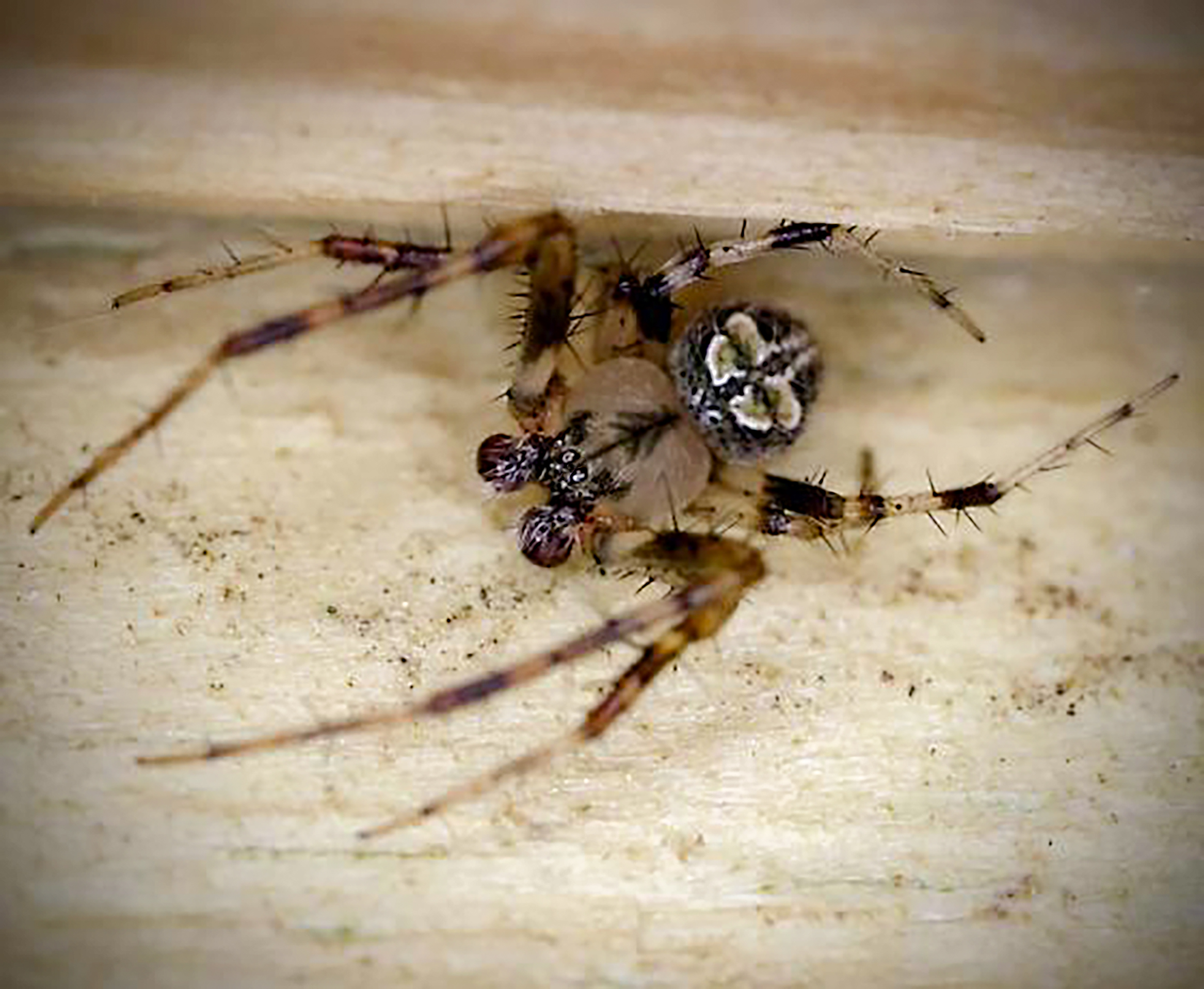
Butterfly Orbweaver (Araneus pegnia) male

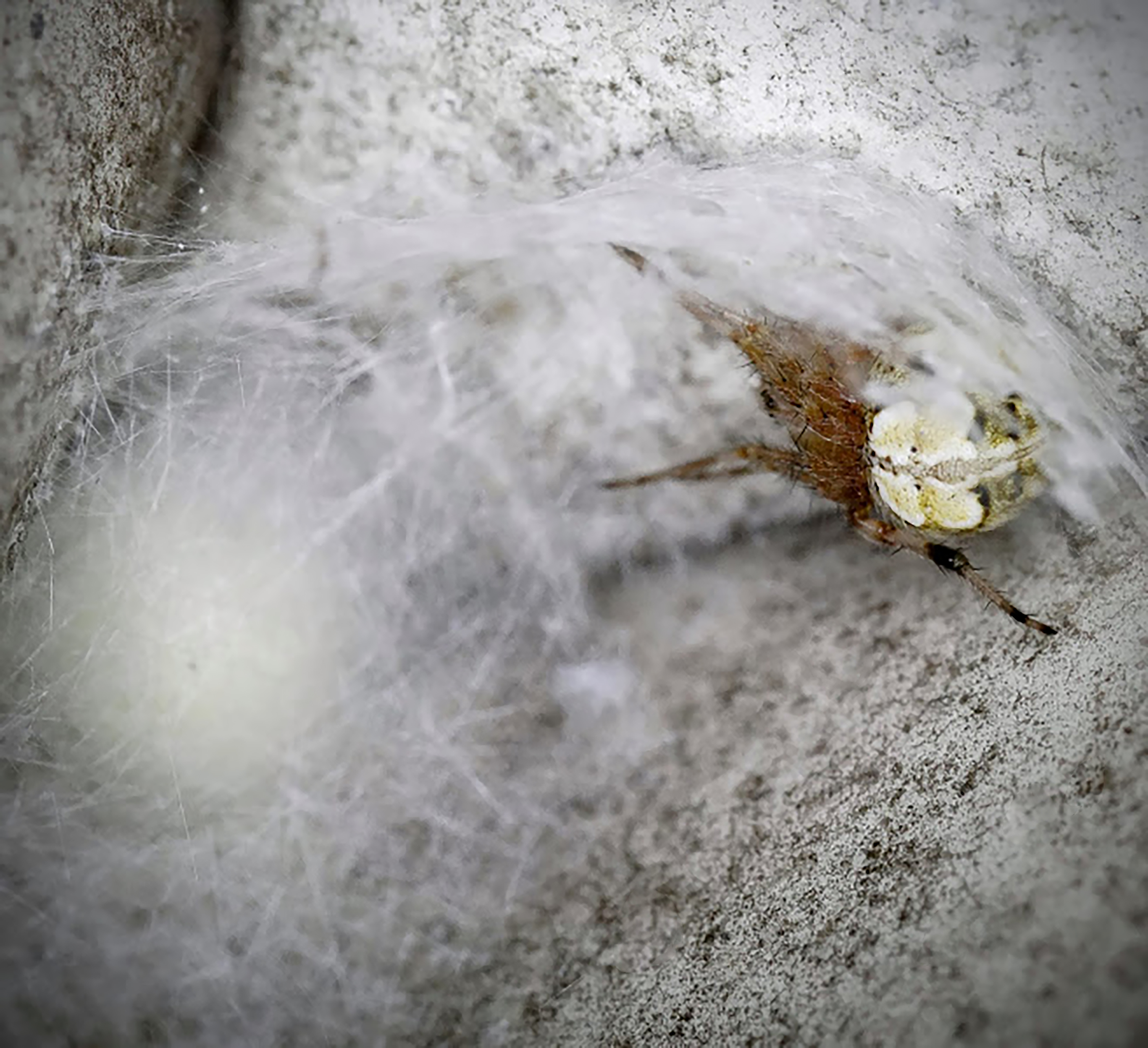
female in retreat with egg sac

Araneus pegnia is a species of orb weaver in the spider family Araneidae. It is found in a range from the United States to Ecuador and Jamaica.

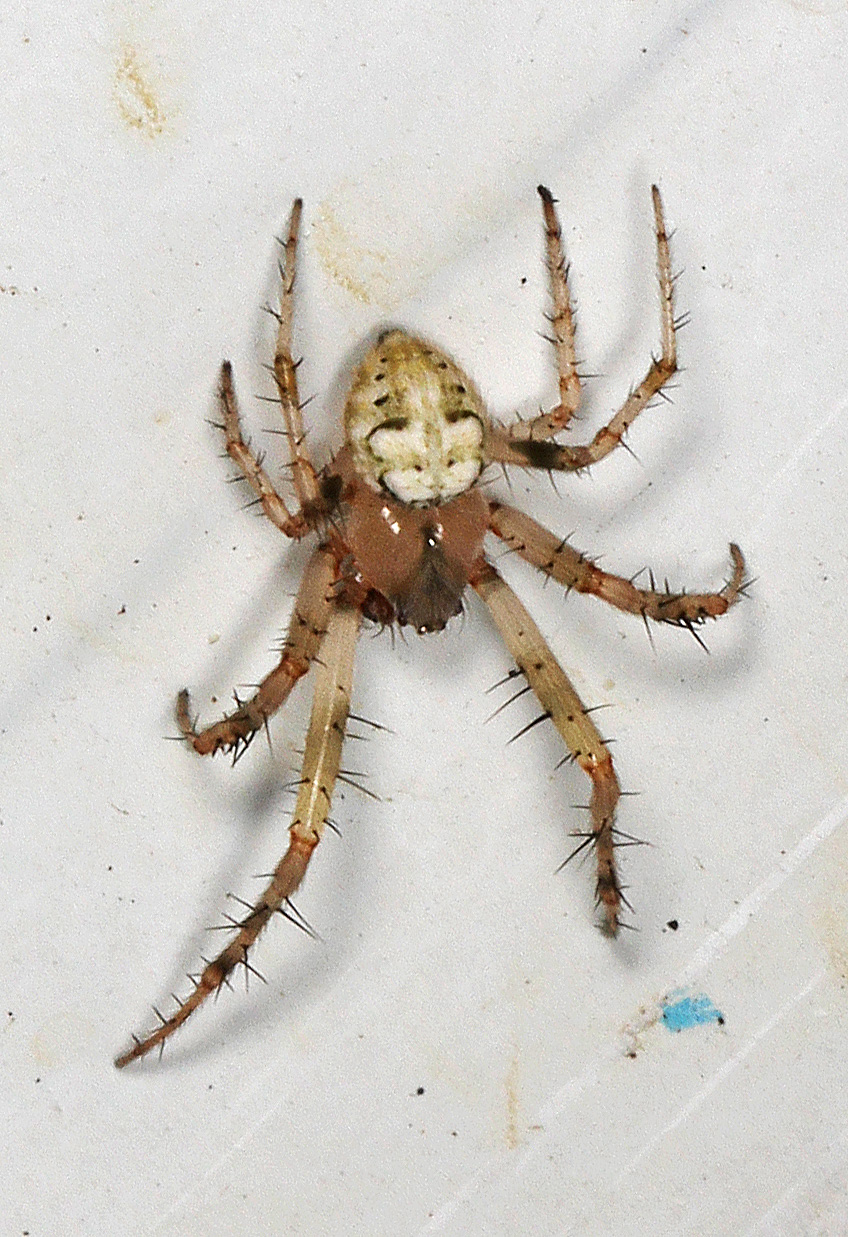
