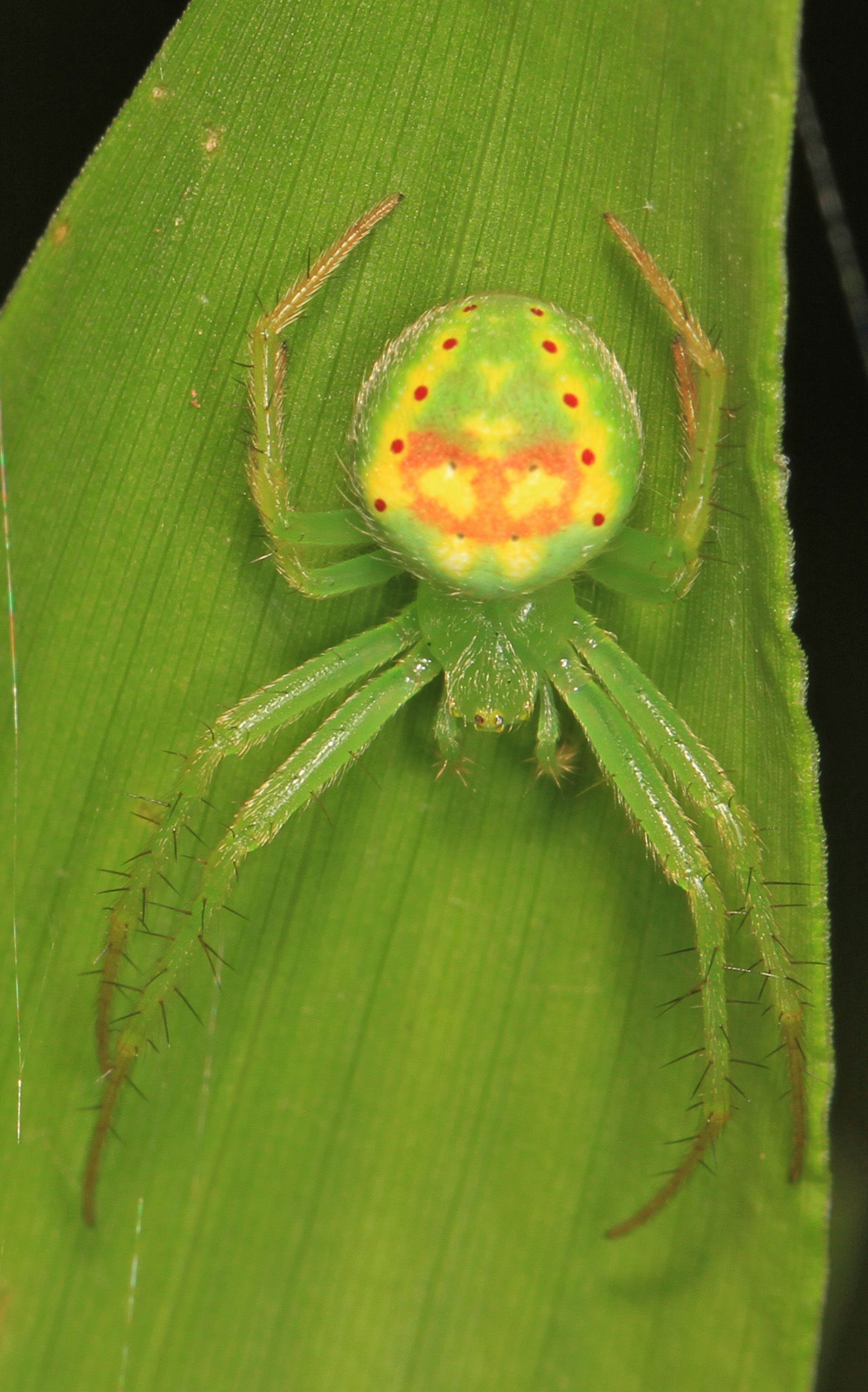

Scientific classification
- Domain: Eukaryota
- Kingdom: Animalia
- Phylum: Arthropoda
- Subphylum: Chelicerata
- Class: Arachnida
- Order: Araneae
- Infraorder: Araneomorphae
- Family: Araneidae
- Genus: Araneus
- Species: A. cingulatus

Binomial name
- Araneus cingulatus (Walckenaer, 1841)

= Araneus cingulatus =

Species of spider

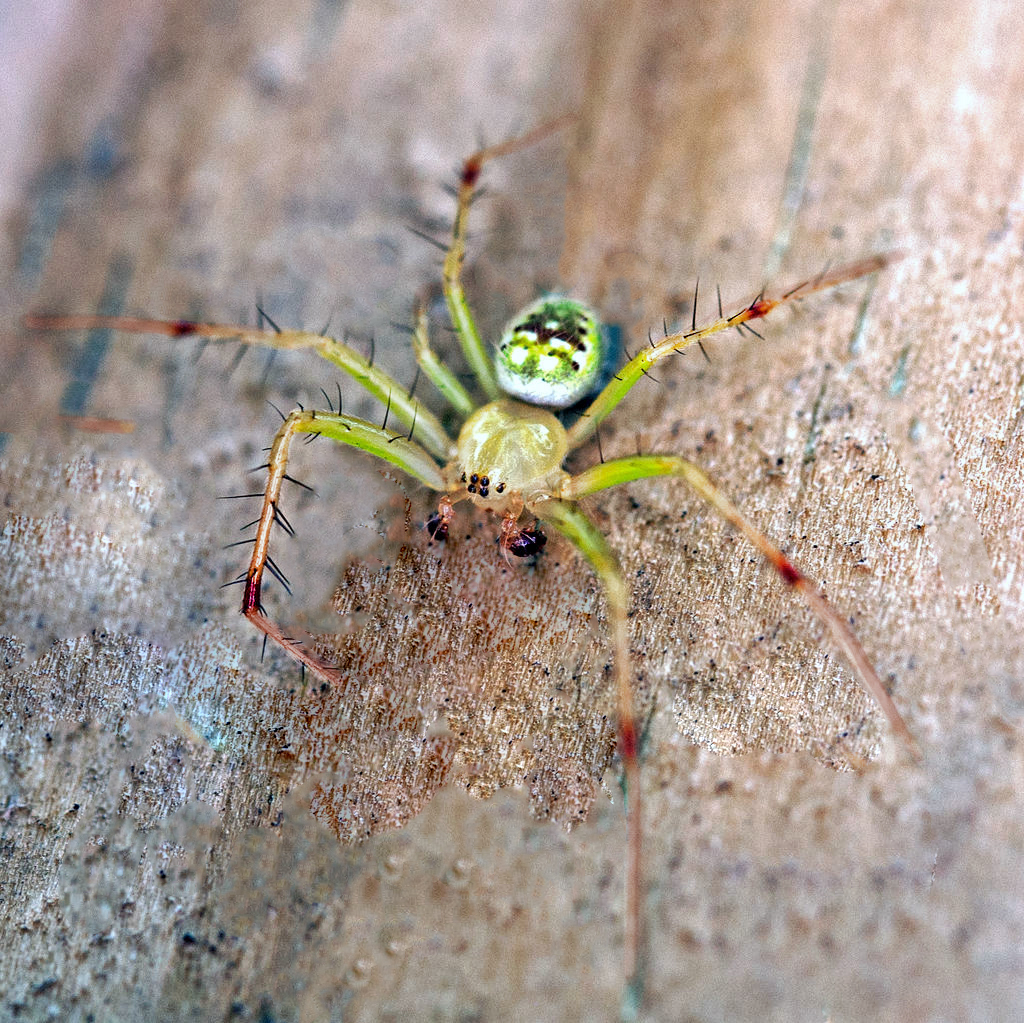
Green orbweaver spider (araneus cingulatus) male

Araneus cingulatus is a species of orb weaver in the family of spiders known as Araneidae. It is found in the United States and British Columbia, Canada.
