= Araneus partitus =

Scientific classification
- Domain: Eukaryota
- Kingdom: Animalia
- Phylum: Arthropoda
- Subphylum: Chelicerata
- Class: Arachnida
- Order: Araneae
- Infraorder: Araneomorphae
- Family: Araneidae
- Genus: Araneus
- Species: A. partitus

Binomial name
- Araneus partitus (Walckenaer, 1841)

Species of spider

Araneus partitus is a species of orb weaver in the spider family Araneidae. It is found in the United States.
