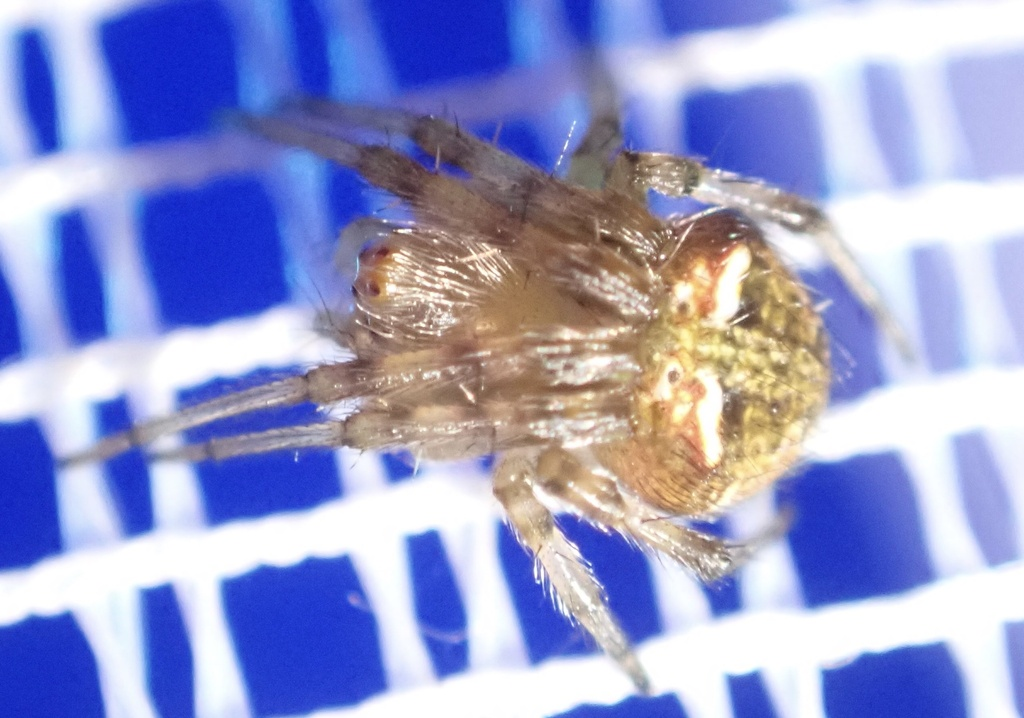
- Dorsal view

Scientific classification
- Domain: Eukaryota
- Kingdom: Animalia
- Phylum: Arthropoda
- Subphylum: Chelicerata
- Class: Arachnida
- Order: Araneae
- Infraorder: Araneomorphae
- Family: Araneidae
- Genus: Araneus
- Species: A. albotriangulus

Binomial name
- Araneus albotriangulus (Keyserling, 1887)

= White-winged orbweaver =

Species of spiders

The white-winged orbweaver (Araneus albotriangulus) is a small orbweaver that was first described in the year 1887 by Eugen von Keyserling. These spiders were previously known as Araneus parvulus and Eriophora parvulus before they got their current scientific name.

== Description ==
Araneus albotriangulus can be easily recognized by the "wing" markings on their abdomens, from which their common name is derived. These markings are less noticeable on male members of the species.

== Range ==
The white-winged orbweaver is typically found in eastern Australia. Specifically, they have been spotted in the Australian states of Queensland, New South Wales, Victoria, and Tasmania.

== Behavior ==
These spiders are known to construct loosely tangled webs in shrubs and bushes. Their fluffly white egg sacs will often be found unconcealed nearby.
