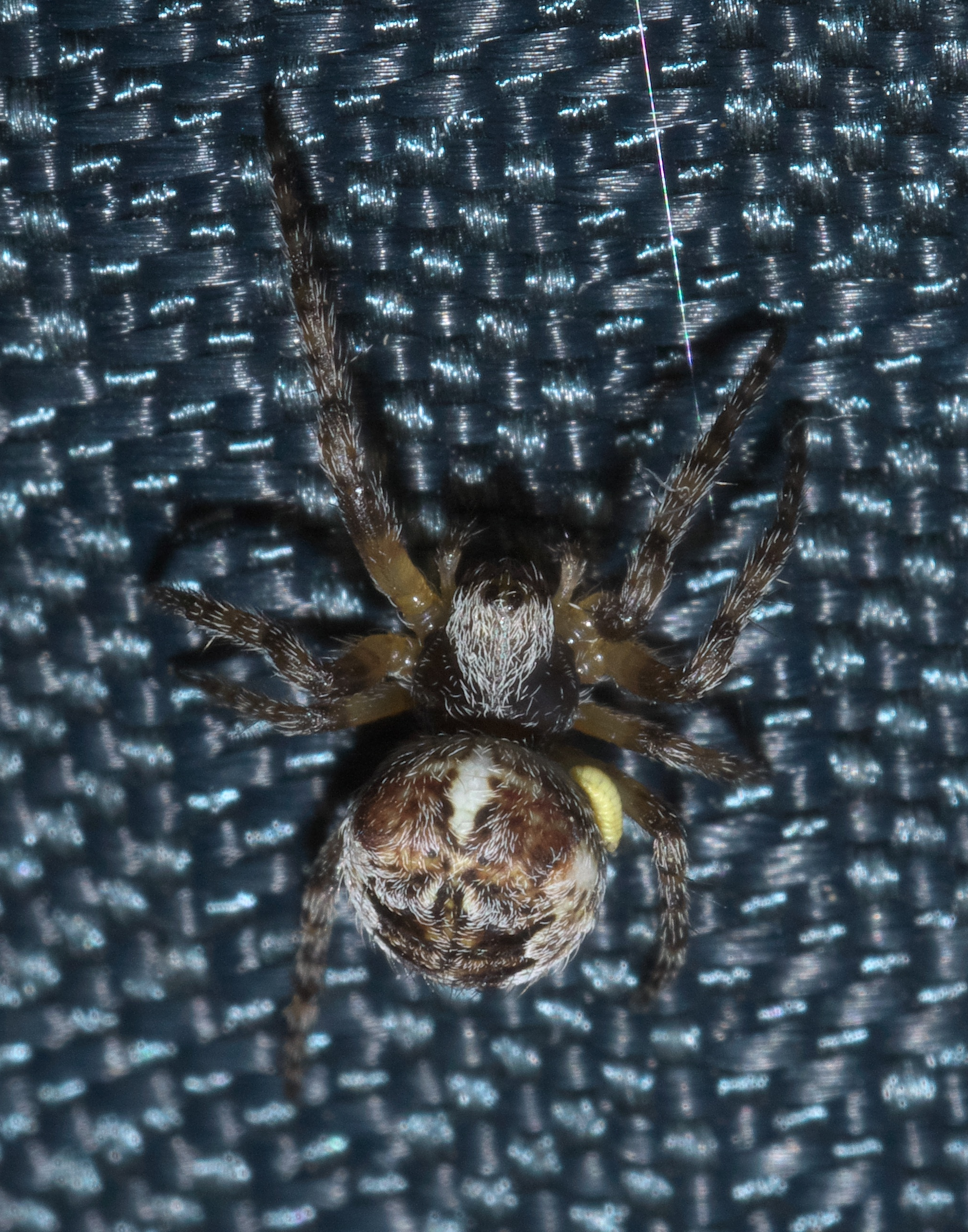

Scientific classification
- Domain: Eukaryota
- Kingdom: Animalia
- Phylum: Arthropoda
- Subphylum: Chelicerata
- Class: Arachnida
- Order: Araneae
- Infraorder: Araneomorphae
- Family: Araneidae
- Genus: Araneus
- Species: A. bicentenarius

Binomial name
- Araneus bicentenarius (McCook, 1888)

= Araneus bicentenarius =

Species of spider

Araneus bicentenarius, the giant lichen orbweaver, is a species of orb weaver in the family Araneidae. It is found in the USA and Canada.

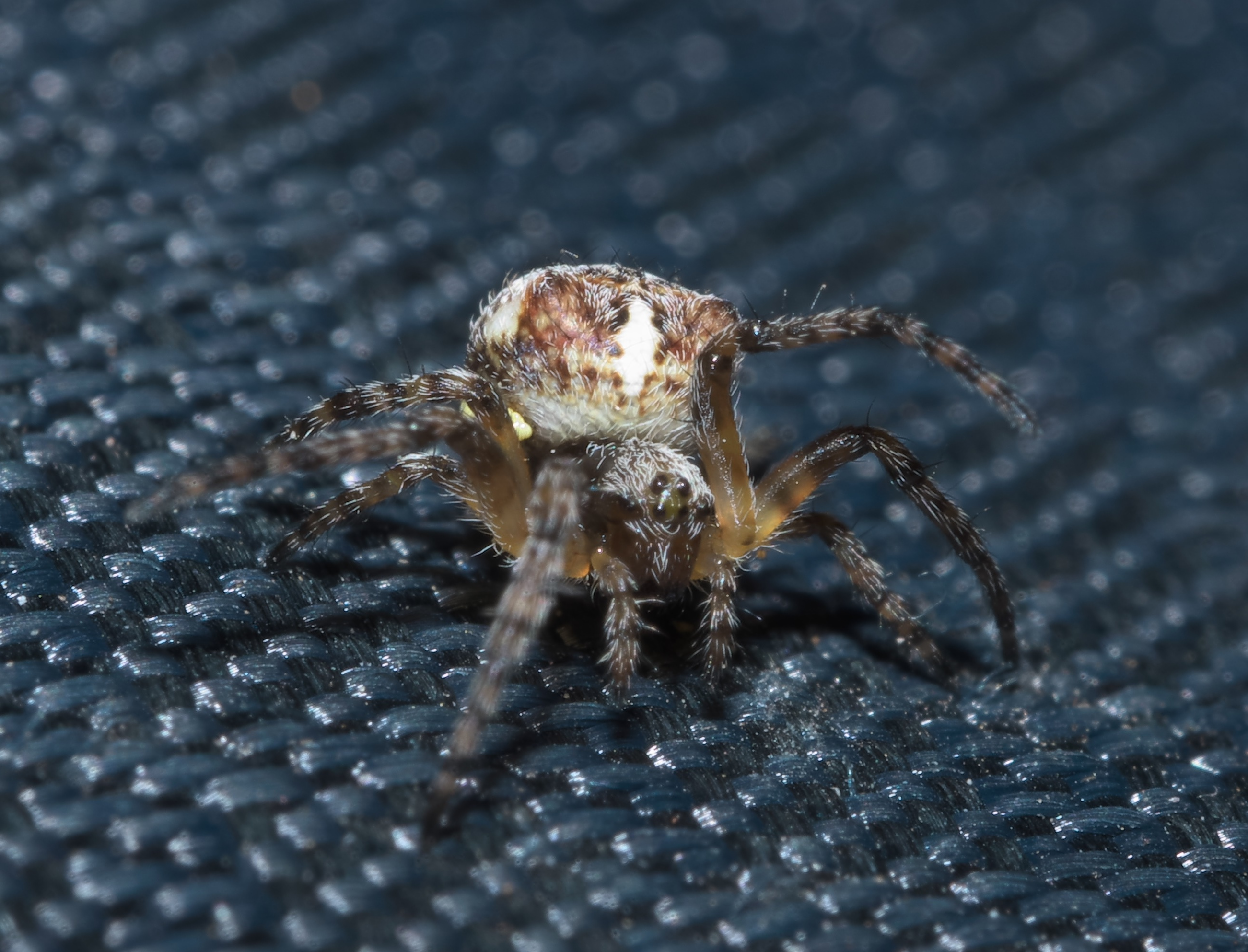
Giant Lichen Orbweaver, Araneus bicentenarius, Summit, CO, USA

== Range ==
The giant lichen orb weaver occurs in the Eastern part of the United States and in Southeastern Canada.

== Web ==
Like most other orb weaver species, Araneus bicentenarius spins large webs up to 8 feet in diameter. While most other species of its genera usually wait for prey upside down in the center of the web, the giant lichen orb weaver spends most time at the edge of the web.
