= Araneus groenlandicola =

Scientific classification
- Kingdom: Animalia
- Phylum: Arthropoda
- Subphylum: Chelicerata
- Class: Arachnida
- Order: Araneae
- Infraorder: Araneomorphae
- Family: Araneidae
- Genus: Araneus
- Species: A. groenlandicola

Binomial name
- Araneus groenlandicola (Strand, 1906)

Species of spider

Araneus groenlandicola is a species of orb weaver in the spider family Araneidae. It is found in the United States, Canada, and Greenland.
