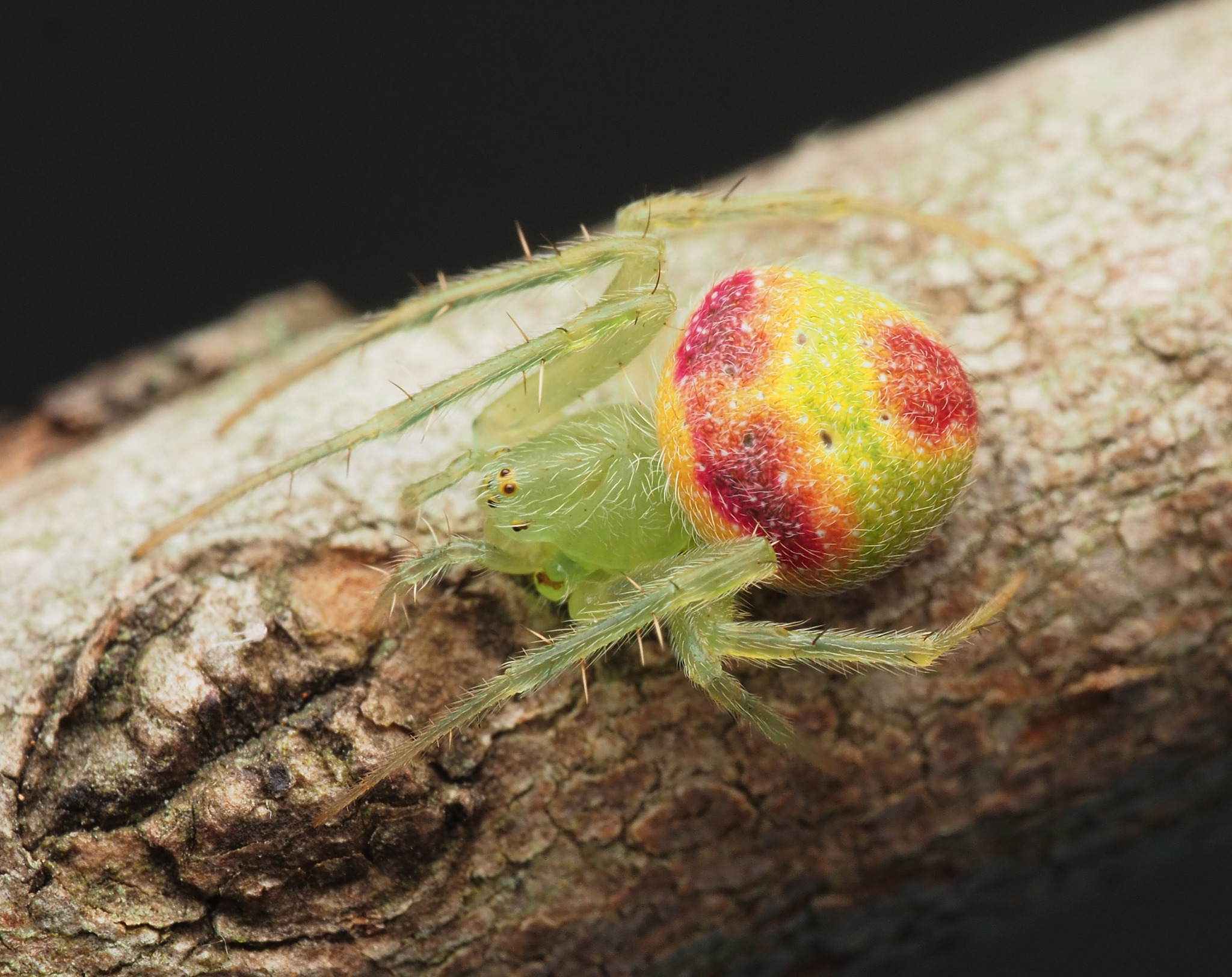

Scientific classification
- Domain: Eukaryota
- Kingdom: Animalia
- Phylum: Arthropoda
- Subphylum: Chelicerata
- Class: Arachnida
- Order: Araneae
- Infraorder: Araneomorphae
- Family: Araneidae
- Genus: Araneus
- Species: A. circulissparsus

Binomial name
- Araneus circulissparsus (Keyserling, 1887)

Synonyms
- Epeira circulissparsa Keyserling, 1887

= Araneus circulissparsus =

Species of spider

Araneus circulissparsus, the speckled orbweaver is a species of orb weaver in the family Araneidae. The species is native to New South Wales, Australia.
