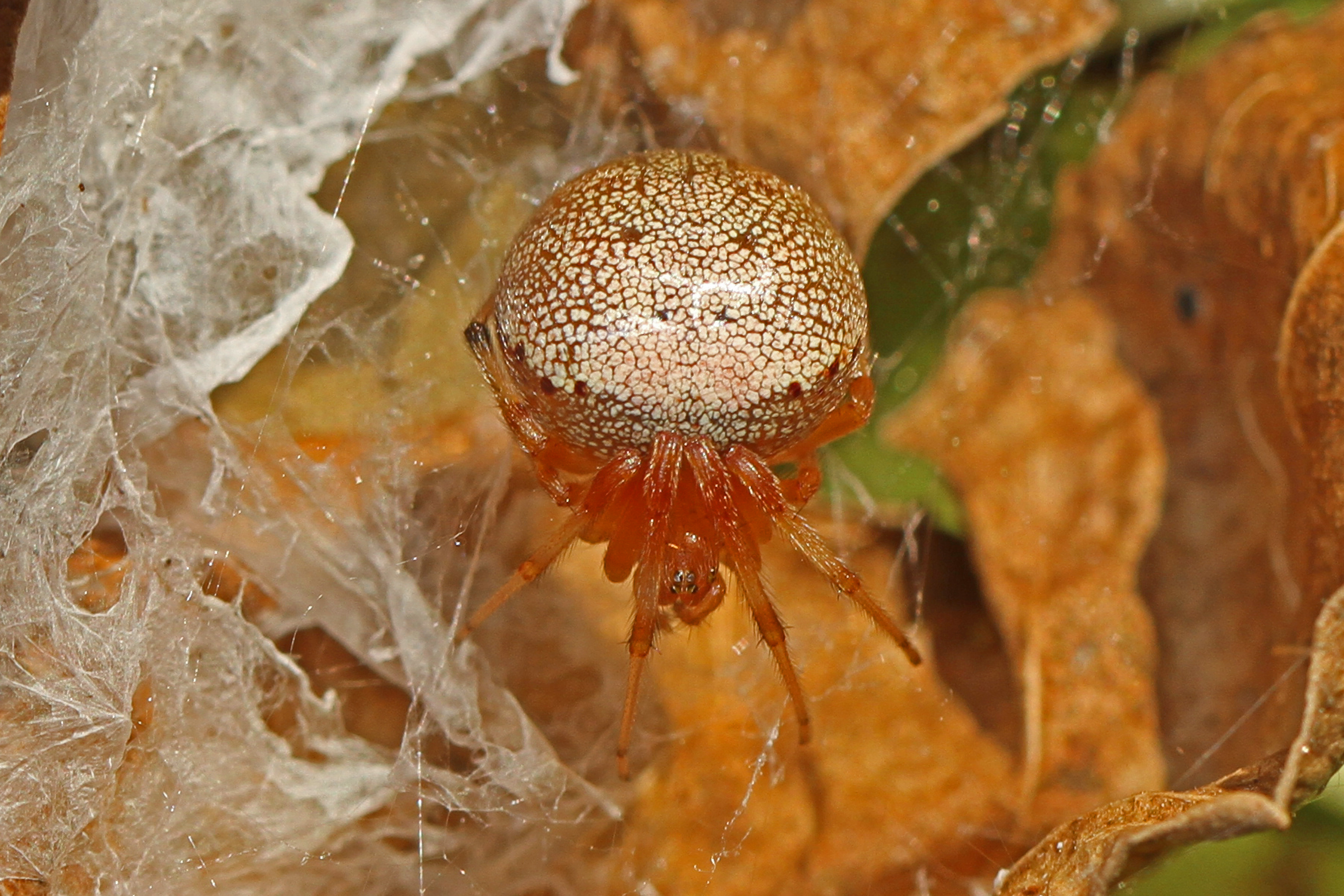

Scientific classification
- Domain: Eukaryota
- Kingdom: Animalia
- Phylum: Arthropoda
- Subphylum: Chelicerata
- Class: Arachnida
- Order: Araneae
- Infraorder: Araneomorphae
- Family: Araneidae
- Genus: Araneus
- Species: A. thaddeus

Binomial name
- Araneus thaddeus (Hentz, 1847)

= Araneus thaddeus =

Species of spider

Araneus thaddeus or the lattice orbweaver, is a species of orb weaver in the spider family Araneidae. It is found in North America.
