= Araneus obtusatus =

Scientific classification
- Kingdom: Animalia
- Phylum: Arthropoda
- Subphylum: Chelicerata
- Class: Arachnida
- Order: Araneae
- Infraorder: Araneomorphae
- Family: Araneidae
- Genus: Araneus
- Species: A. obtusatus

Binomial name
- Araneus obtusatus (Karsch, 1892)

Synonyms
- Epeira obtusata Karsch, 1892

Species of spider

Araneus obtusatus is a species of spider of the genus Araneus. It is endemic to Sri Lanka.
