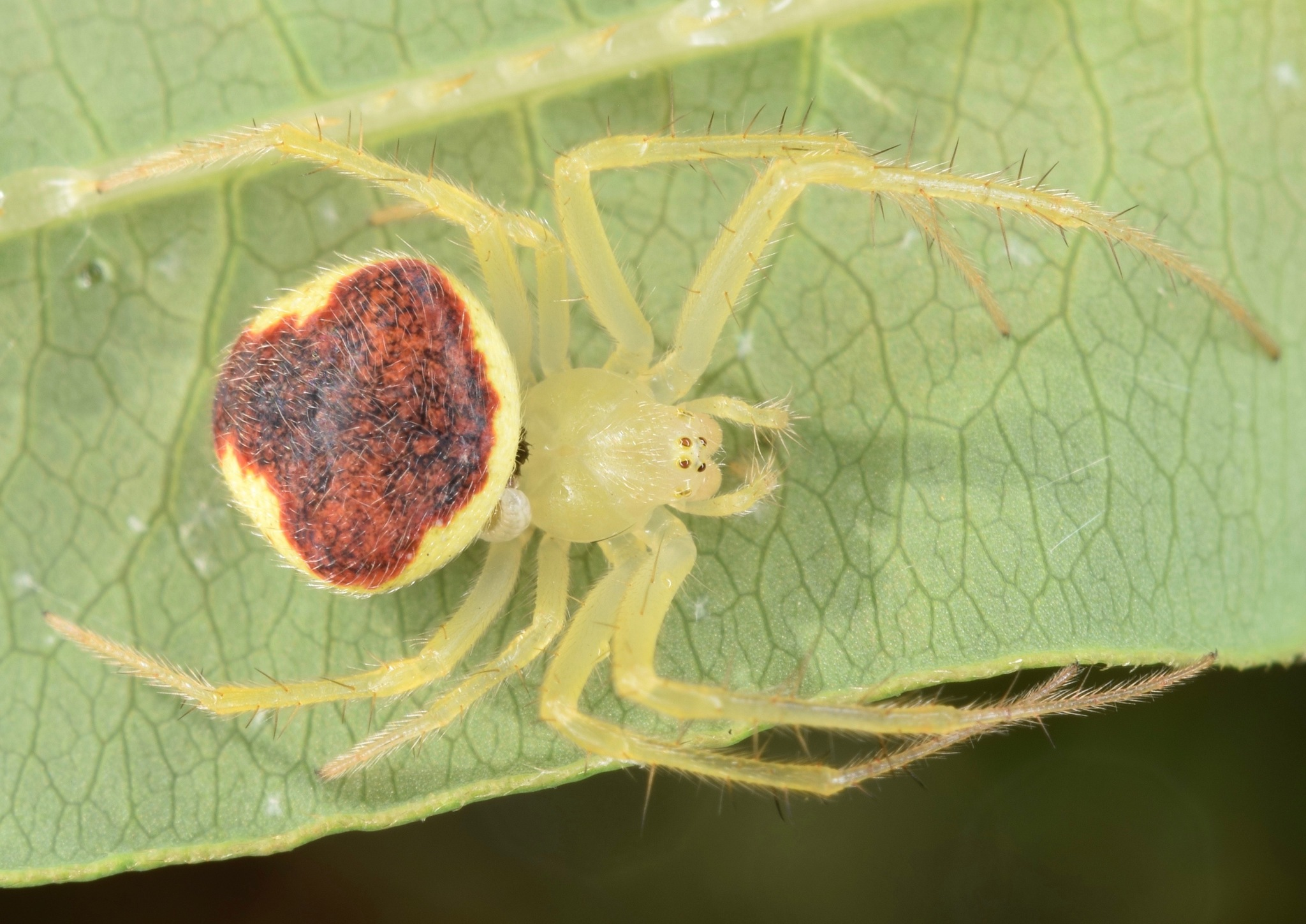

Scientific classification
- Domain: Eukaryota
- Kingdom: Animalia
- Phylum: Arthropoda
- Subphylum: Chelicerata
- Class: Arachnida
- Order: Araneae
- Infraorder: Araneomorphae
- Family: Araneidae
- Genus: Araneus
- Species: A. alboventris

Binomial name
- Araneus alboventris (Emerton, 1884)

= Araneus alboventris =

Species of spider

Araneus alboventris is a species of orb weaver in the spider family Araneidae. It is found in the United States.
