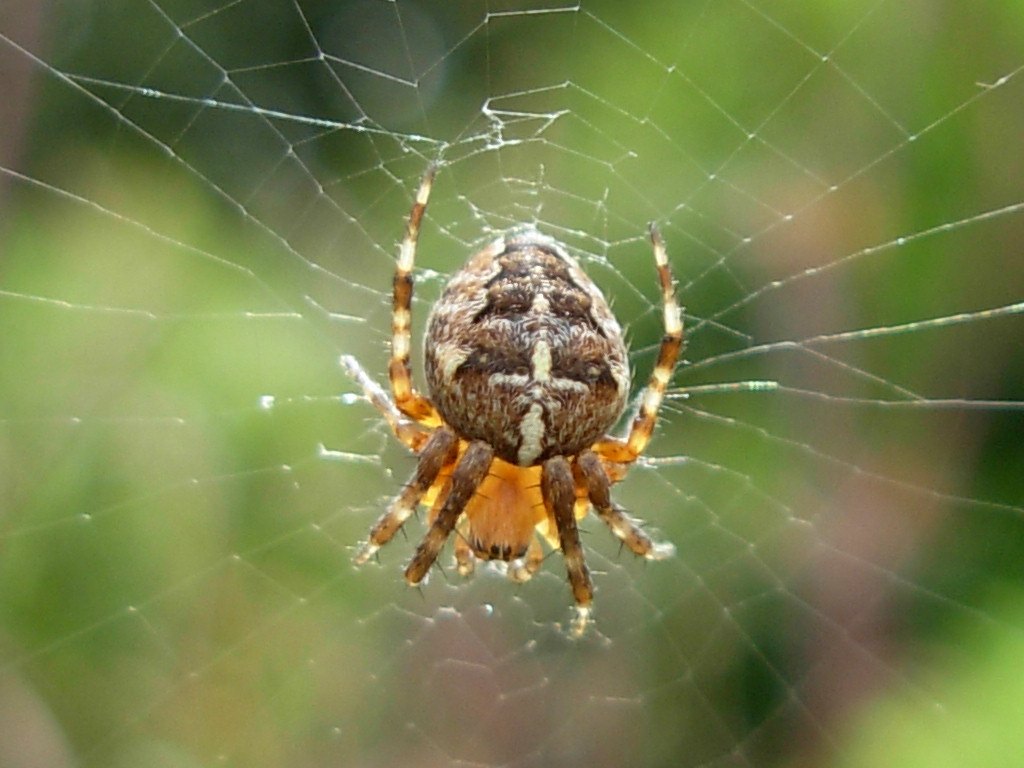
- European garden spider (Araneus diadematus)
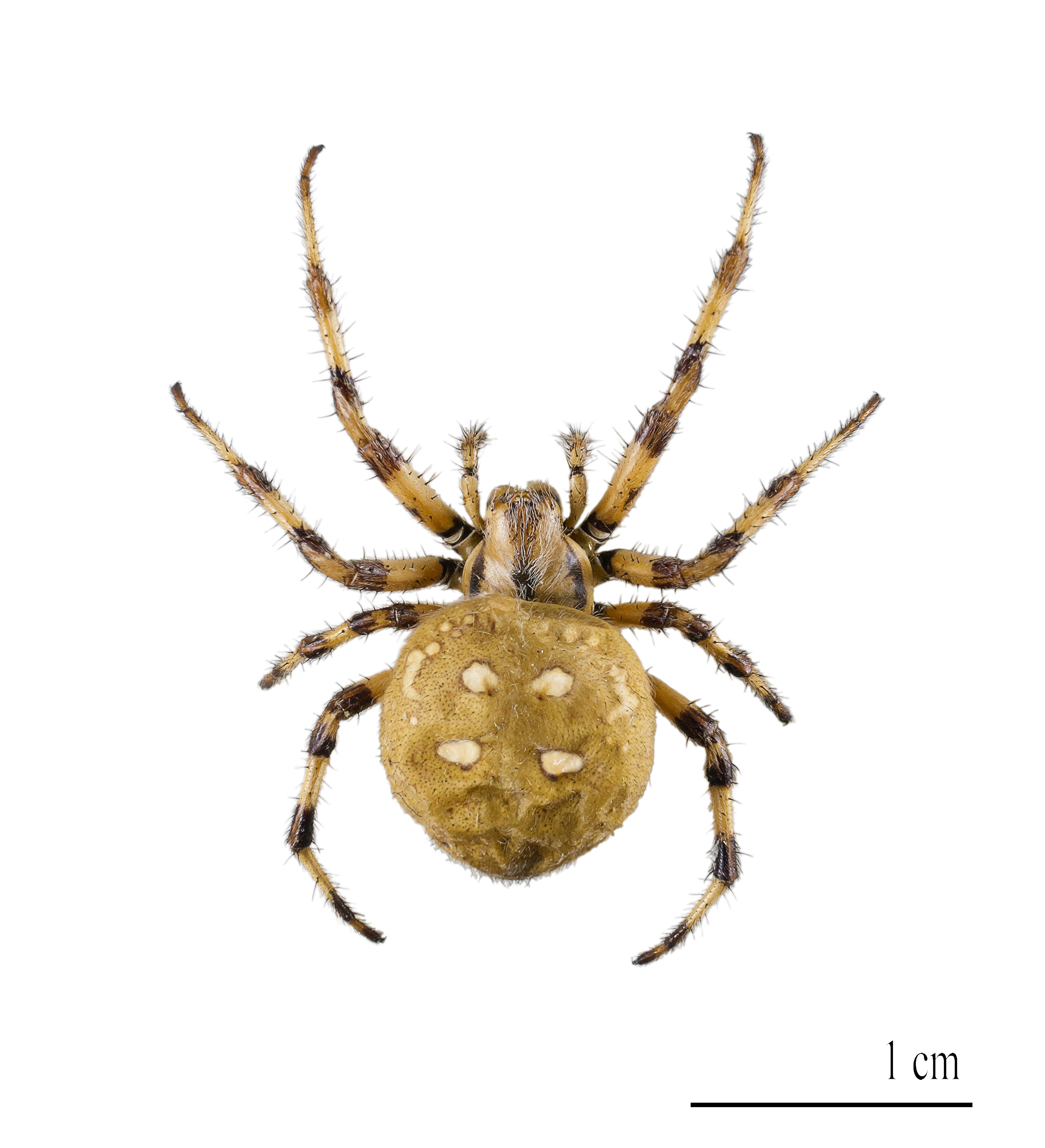
- Four-spot orb-weaver (Araneus quadratus)

Scientific classification
- Kingdom: Animalia
- Phylum: Arthropoda
- Subphylum: Chelicerata
- Class: Arachnida
- Order: Araneae
- Infraorder: Araneomorphae
- Family: Araneidae
- Tribe: Araneini
- Genus: Araneus; Clerck, 1757

Type species
- Araneus angulatus Clerck, 1757

Species
- See list.

Diversity
- 549 species

Synonyms
- Epeira Walckenaer, 1805; Atea C.L. Koch, 1837; Epira Agassiz, 1846 (Unj. Emend.); Amamrotypus Archer, 1951; Cambridgepeira Archer, 1951; Conaranea Archer, 1951; Conepeira Archer, 1951; Cathaistela Archer, 1958; Neosconella F.O.P.-Cambridge, 1903

= Araneus =

Araneus Temporal range: Cretaceous–present

Genus of spiders

Araneus is a genus of common orb-weaving spiders with more than 500 species, among which are the European garden spider and the barn spider. The genus was erected by Carl Alexander Clerck in 1757.

== Description ==
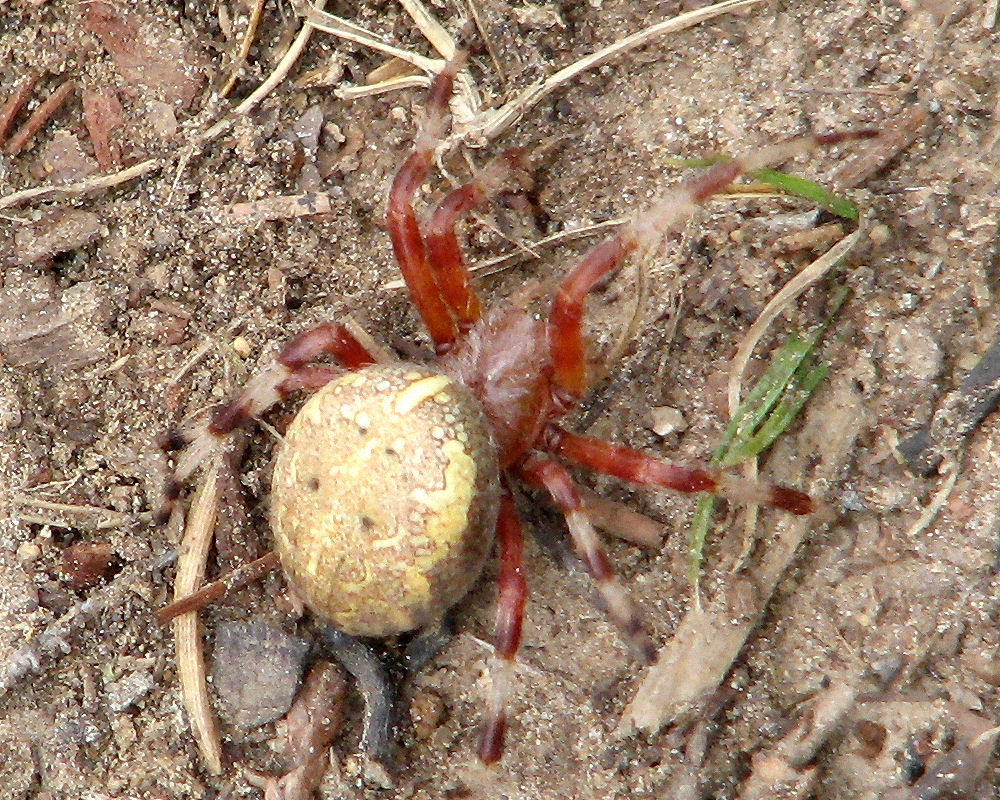
Marbled orb-weaver (Araneus marmoreus), Temagami, Ontario

Spiders of this genus present perhaps the most obvious case of sexual dimorphism among all of the orb-weaver family, with males being normally 1/3 to 1/4 the size of females. In A. diadematus, for example, last-molt females can reach a body size up to 1 in (2.5 cm), while most males seldom grow over 0.3 in (1 cm), both excluding leg span. Males are differentiated from females by a much smaller and more elongated abdomen, longer legs, and the inability to catch or consume prey bigger than themselves.

In females, the epigyne has a long scape (a tongue-like appendage). Male pedipalps have a hook-like terminal apophysis. Abdominal tubercles are present anterolaterally.

== Taxonomic history ==
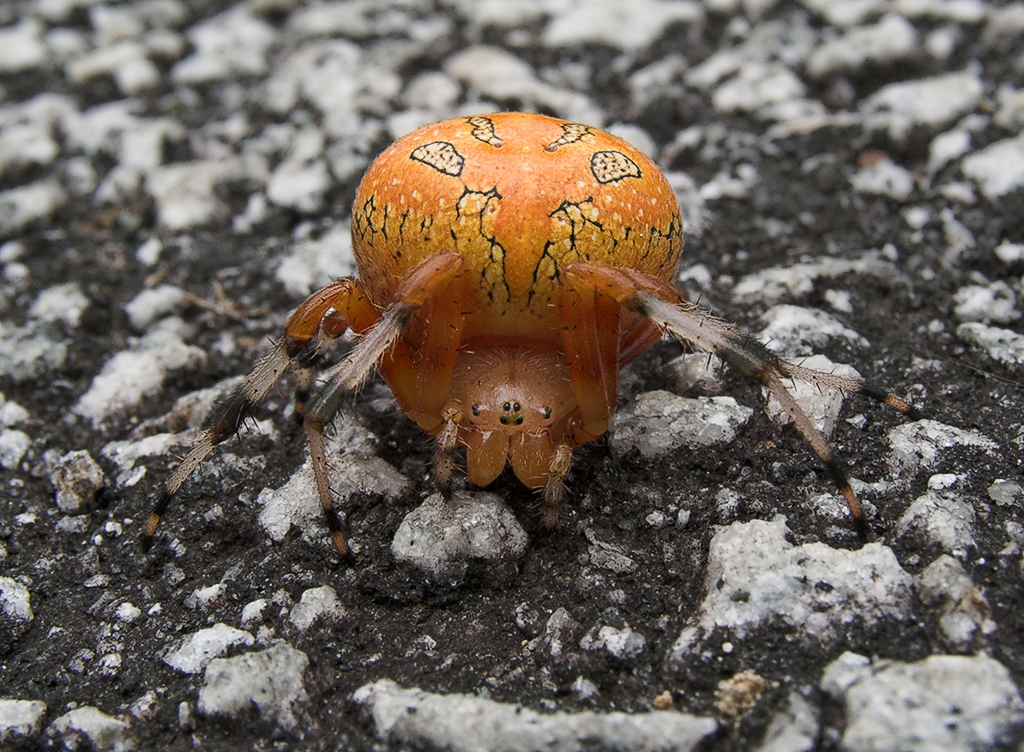
Marbled orb-weaver (Araneus marmoreus)

Araneus was, for much of its history, called Epeira. The latter name is now considered a junior synonym of Araneus, as the latter was published almost 50 years earlier.

Epeira was first coined by Charles Athanase Walckenaer in 1805, for a range of spiders now considered Araneidae (orb-weavers). Over time, a rather diverse set of spiders was grouped under this genus name, including species from the modern families Araneidae, Mimetidae (Mimetus syllepsicus described by Nicholas Marcellus Hentz in 1832), Tetragnathidae, Theridiidae, Theridiosomatidae (Theridiosoma gemmosum, described by Ludwig Carl Christian Koch in 1877 as Theridion gemmosum), Titanoecidae (Nurscia albomaculata, described by Hippolyte Lucas in 1846 as Epeira albo-maculata) and Uloboridae (Uloborus glomosus, described by Walckenaer in 1842 as Epeira glomosus). Epeira cylindrica O. P.-Cambridge, 1889 was at a time placed in the Linyphiidae and is considered incertae sedis, as is "Araneus" cylindriformis (Roewer, 1942).

Epeira was synonymized with the genus Aranea by William Elford Leach in 1815, and with Araneus by Eugène Simon in 1904, though this synonymy was not universally recognized.

Throughout the 19th century, Epeira was used as a catch-all genus, similar to the once ubiquitous salticid genus Attus. However, from 1911, to its last mention in 1957, only very few authors continued to use the genus in their publications, notably Franganillo (1913, 1918), Hingston (1932), Kaston (1948), and Marples (1957). Chamberlin and Ivie published a new species, Epeira miniata, in 1944, which was rejected.

Jean-Henri Fabre refers to Argiope spiders as Epeira in his 1928 book The Life of the Spider (La Vie des araignées), within the family "Epeirae". James Henry Emerton also uses the genus Epeira in his 1902 book The Common Spiders of the United States, but refers to spiders mostly now considered Araneus. The popular 1893 book American Spiders and their Spinningwork by Henry Christopher McCook also uses Epeira extensively.

== In popular culture ==
The short documentary Epeira diadema (1952) by Italian director Alberto Ancilotto was nominated for an Oscar in 1953. It is about the spider today known as Araneus diadematus.

== Venom ==
Araneus spider venoms vary in toxicity, but often deliver a dry bite (8 of 10 occasions). Females bite more often than males, which would rather flee or feign death.

== Species ==
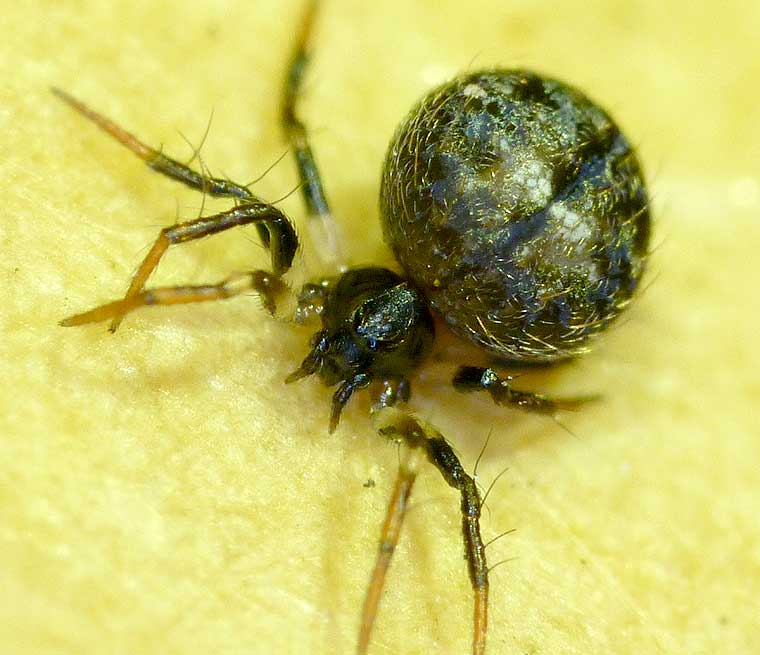
A. acuminatus

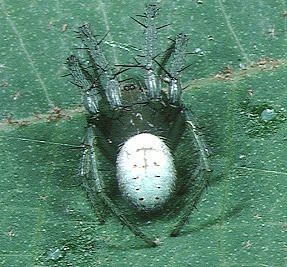
male A. amabilis

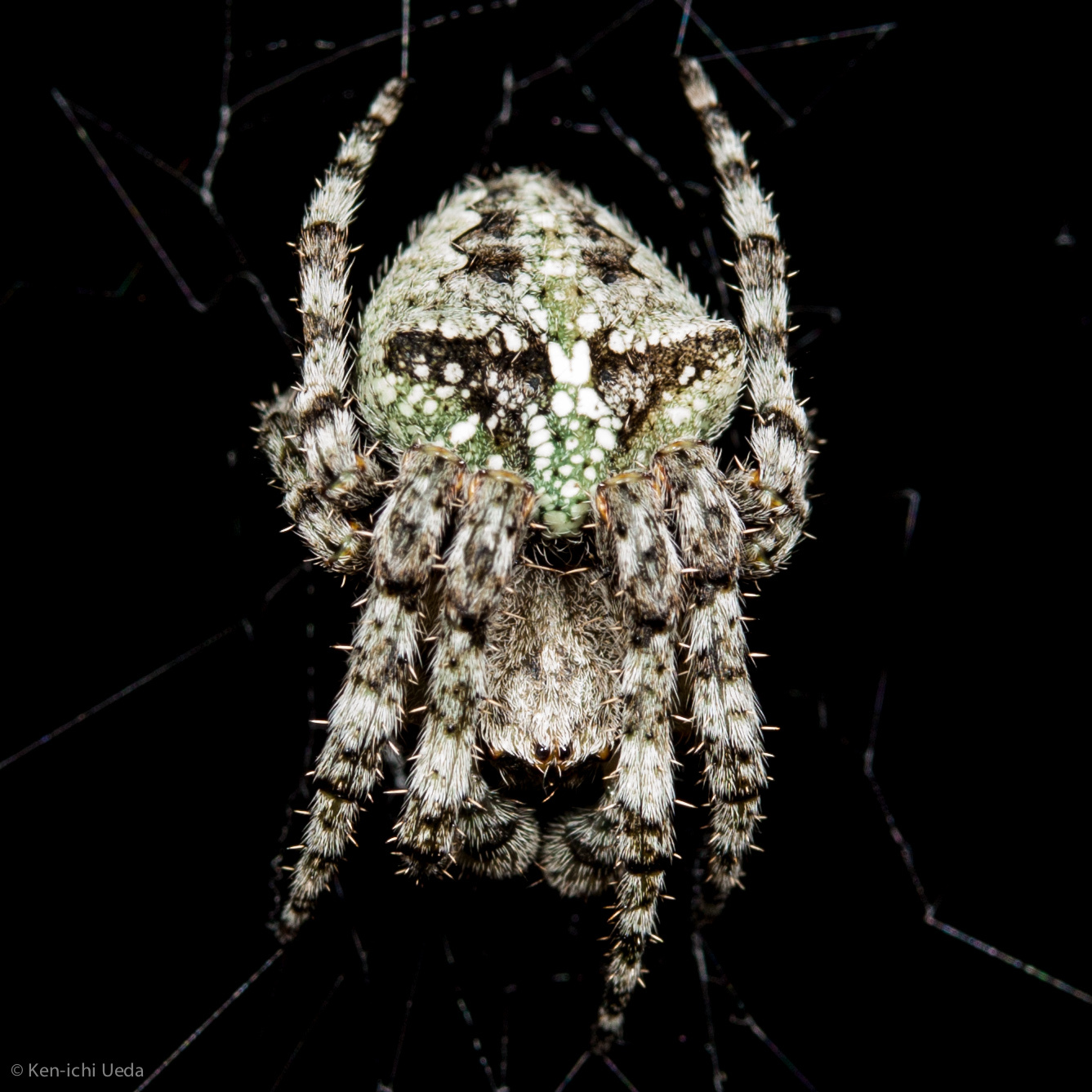
A. andrewsi

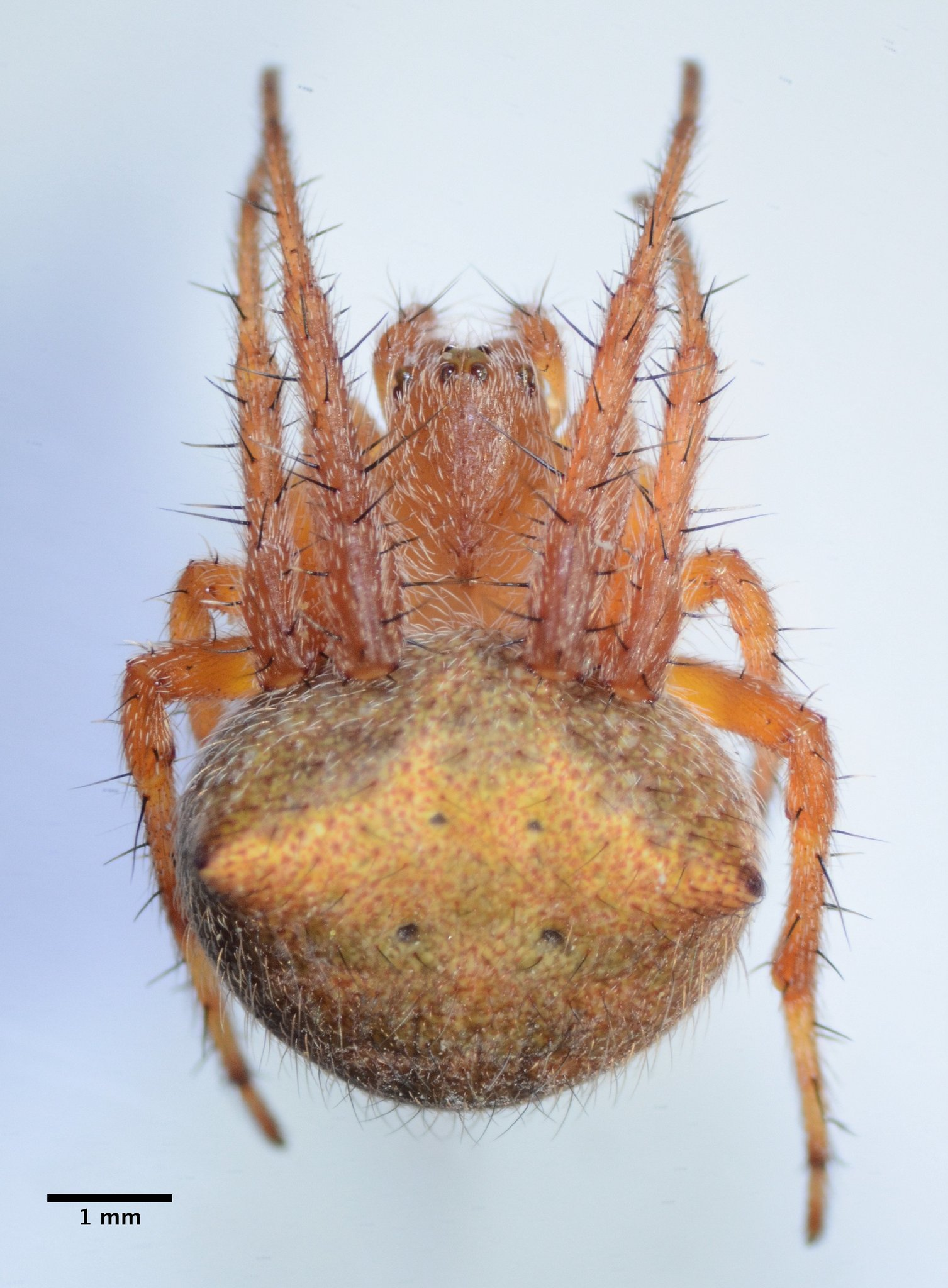
A. bispinosus

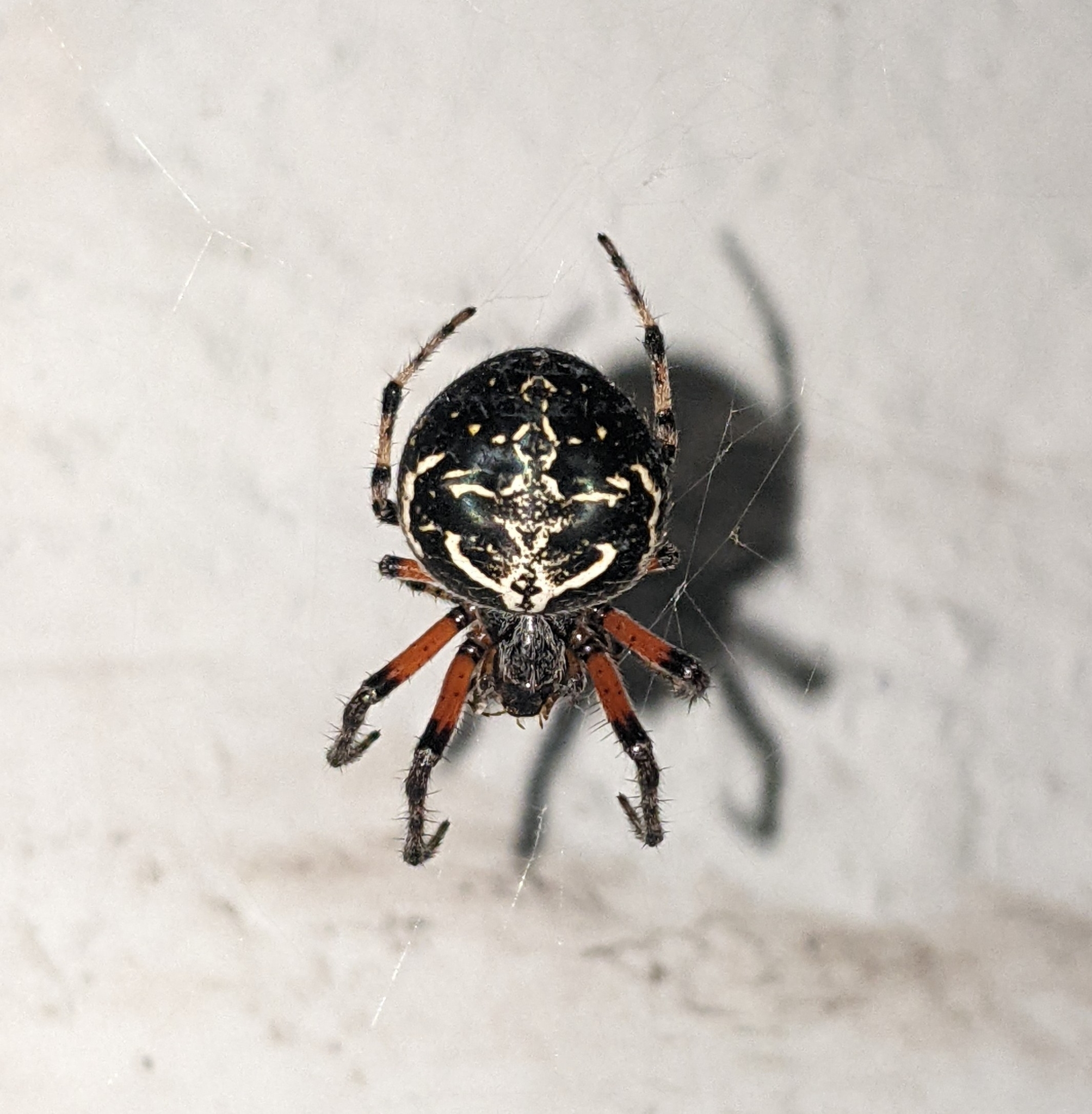
A. granadensis

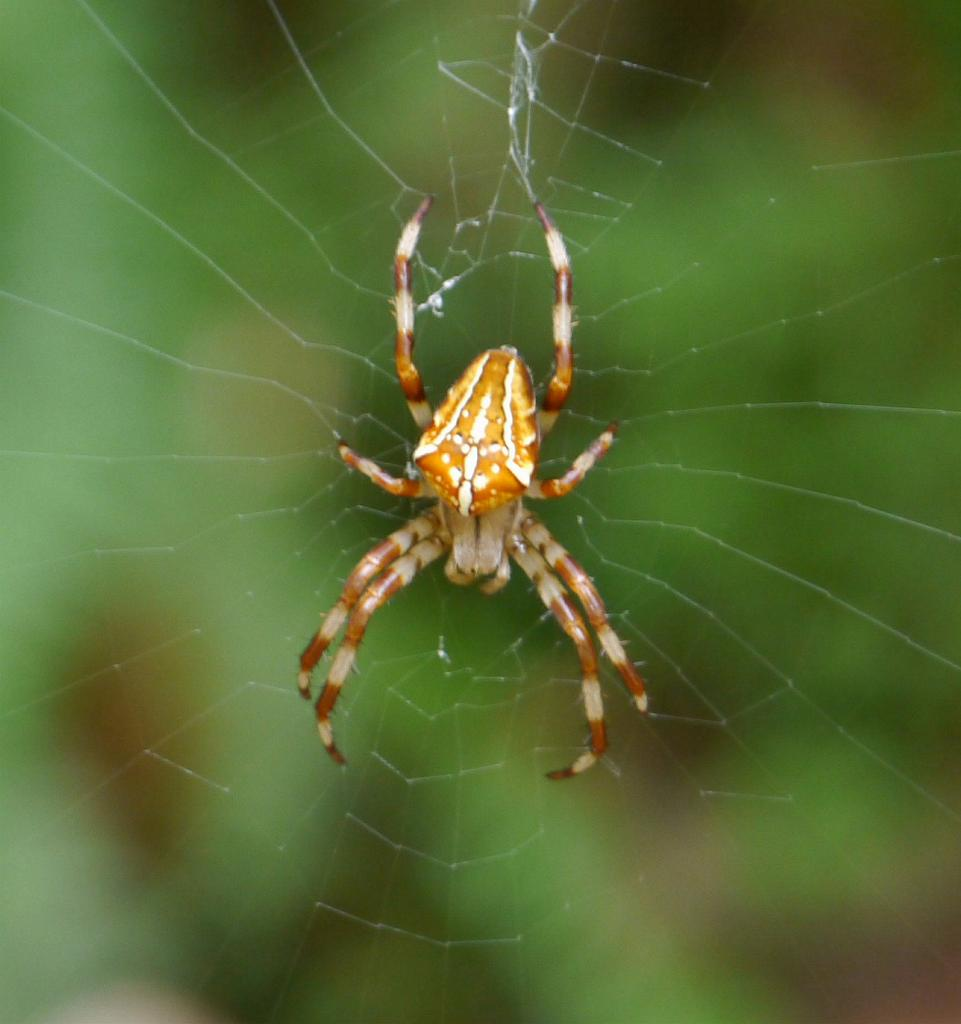
A. ishisawai

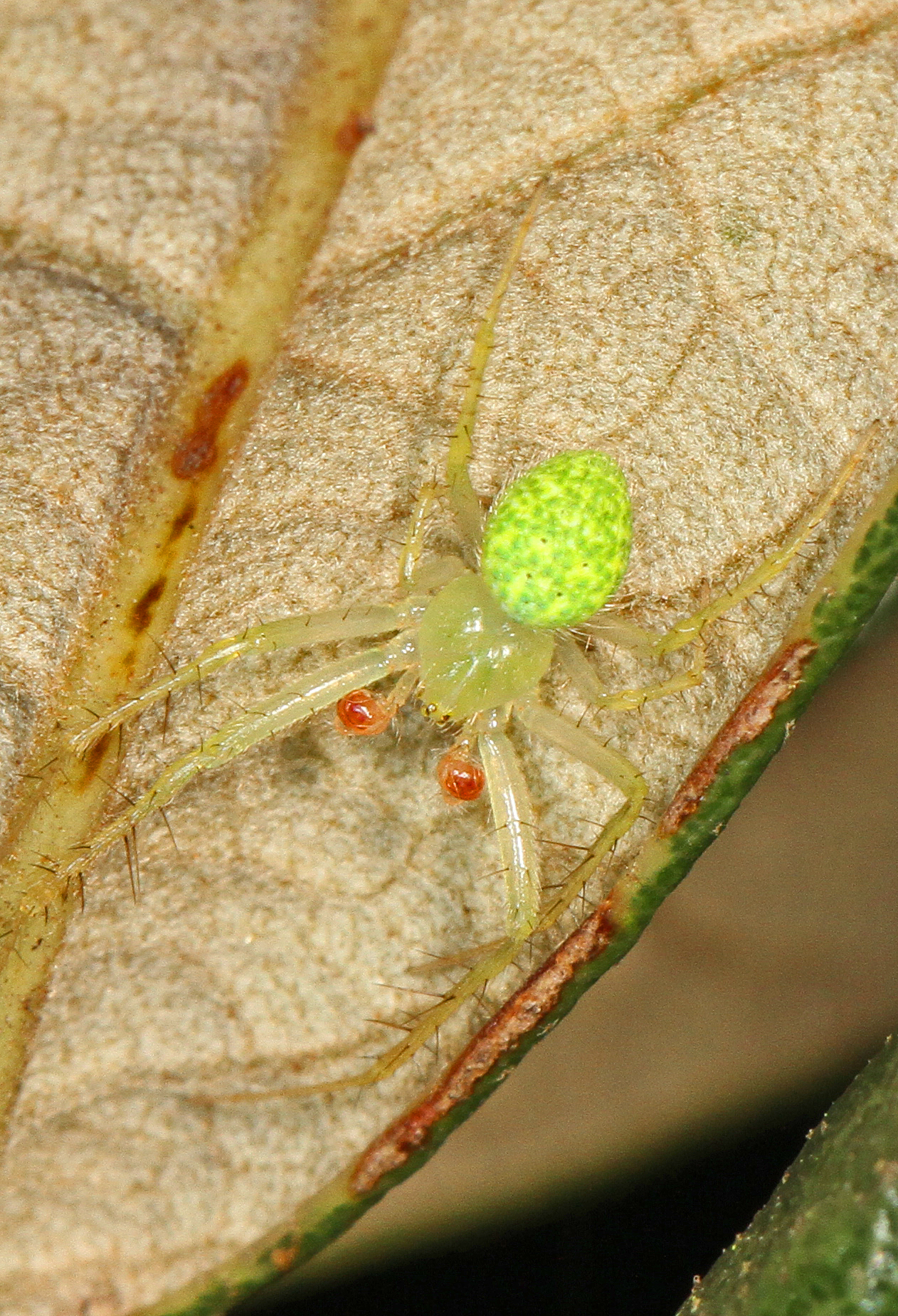
A. juniperi

As of November 2026, the genus Araneus Clerck, 1757 includes 538 species and 12 subspecies.

This is a list of species in this genus that have articles on Wikipedia as of October 2026:

- Araneus albotriangulus (Keyserling, 1887) – Australia (Queensland, New South Wales)
- Araneus alboventris (Emerton, 1884) – Canada, United States
- Araneus alsine (Walckenaer, 1802) – Europe, Turkey, Caucasus, Russia (Europe to Far East), Kazakhstan, Japan
- Araneus andrewsi (Archer, 1951) – United States
- Araneus angulatus Clerck, 1757 – Europe, North Africa, Turkey, Russia (Europe to Far East), Iran, Central Asia, Korea (type species)
- Araneus apricus (Karsch, 1884) – São Tomé, Tanzania, Zambia, Namibia, Botswana, Zimbabwe, South Africa, Eswatini, Seychelles, Yemen (mainland, Socotra)
- Araneus arizonensis (Banks, 1900) – United States, Mexico
- Araneus asiaticus Bakhvalov, 1983 – Kyrgyzstan
- Araneus bicentenarius (McCook, 1888) – Canada, United States
- Araneus bispinosus (Keyserling, 1885) – United States
- Araneus bivittatus (Walckenaer, 1841) – United States
- Araneus bonsallae (McCook, 1894) – United States
- Araneus calusa Levi, 1973 – United States
- Araneus cavaticus (Keyserling, 1881) – Canada, United States
- Araneus cingulatus (Walckenaer, 1841) – United States
- Araneus circe (Audouin, 1826) – Southern Europe, Tunisia, Egypt, Turkey, Caucasus, Iran
- Araneus circulissparsus (Keyserling, 1887) – Australia (New South Wales)
- Araneus coccinella Pocock, 1898 – South Africa
- Araneus corticarius (Emerton, 1884) – Russia (northeast Siberia), Alaska, Canada, United States
- Araneus detrimentosus (O. Pickard-Cambridge, 1889) – United States, Colombia
- Araneus diadematus Clerck, 1757 – Europe, Middle East, Turkey, Caucasus, Russia (Europe to Far East), Iran, Central Asia, China, Japan. Introduced to North America
- Araneus falcatus Guo, Zhang & Zhu, 2011 – China
- Araneus gadus Levi, 1973 – United States
- Araneus gemma (McCook, 1888) – Alaska, Canada, United States
- Araneus gemmoides Chamberlin & Ivie, 1935 – Canada, United States
- Araneus graemii Pocock, 1900 – South Africa
- Araneus granadensis (Keyserling, 1864) – Venezuela, Peru
- Araneus groenlandicola (Strand, 1906) – Canada, United States, Greenland
- Araneus grossus (C. L. Koch, 1844) – Europe, Central Asia
- Araneus guttulatus (Walckenaer, 1841) – Canada, United States
- Araneus illaudatus (Gertsch & Mulaik, 1936) – United States, Mexico
- Araneus iviei (Archer, 1951) – Alaska, Canada, United States
- Araneus juniperi (Emerton, 1884) – Canada, United States
- Araneus mammatus (Archer, 1951) – United States
- Araneus marmoreus Clerck, 1757 – North America, Europe, Turkey, Caucasus, Russia (Europe to Far East), Iran, Central Asia, India, China, Korea, Japan
- Araneus miniatus (Walckenaer, 1841) – United States
- Araneus montereyensis (Archer, 1951) – North America
- Araneus nigroquadratus Lawrence, 1937 – Namibia, South Africa
- Araneus niveus (Hentz, 1847) – United States
- Araneus nordmanni (Thorell, 1870) – North America, Europe, Caucasus, Kazakhstan, Russia (Europe to Far East), Korea, Japan
- Araneus obtusatus (Karsch, 1892) – Sri Lanka
- Araneus pallidus (Olivier, 1789) – Portugal, Spain, France, Algeria
- Araneus partitus (Walckenaer, 1841) – United States
- Araneus pegnia (Walckenaer, 1841) – United States, Ecuador and Jamaica
- Araneus pratensis (Emerton, 1884) – Canada, United States
- Araneus quadratus Clerck, 1757 – Europe, Turkey, Russia (Europe to Far East), Iran, Central Asia, China, Japan. Introduced to St. Helena
- Araneus saevus (L. Koch, 1872) – North America, Europe, Russia (Far East)
- Araneus sagicola (Dönitz & Strand, 1906) – Japan
- Araneus strupifer (Simon, 1886) – Senegal, Kenya, Tanzania, Botswana, South Africa
- Araneus svanetiensis Mcheidze, 1997 – Georgia (country)
- Araneus talipedatus (Keyserling, 1887) – Australia
- Araneus tatianae Lessert, 1938 – Congo, South Africa
- Araneus thaddeus (Hentz, 1847) – North America
- Araneus trifolium (Hentz, 1847) – Alaska, Canada, United States
- Araneus varus (Kauri, 1950) – South Africa
- Araneus ventricosus (L. Koch, 1878) – Russia (Far East), Korea, Japan, China, Taiwan
- Araneus yukon Levi, 1971 – Russia (Central to East Siberia), Canada
