= List of Araneidae species: A =

This page lists all described species of the spider family Araneidae as of Dec. 20, 2016, that start with the letter A.

== Acacesia ==
Acacesia Simon, 1895

- Acacesia benigna Glueck, 1994 — Peru, Bolivia, Brazil
- Acacesia graciosa Lise & Braul, 1996 — Brazil
- Acacesia hamata (Hentz, 1847) (type species) — USA to Argentina
- Acacesia tenella (L. Koch, 1871) — Mexico to Brazil, French Guiana, Guyana
- Acacesia villalobosi Glueck, 1994 — Brazil
- Acacesia yacuiensis Glueck, 1994 — Brazil, Argentina

== Acantharachne ==
Acantharachne Tullgren, 1910

- Acantharachne cornuta Tullgren, 1910 (type species) — East Africa
- Acantharachne giltayi Lessert, 1938 — Congo, Madagascar
- Acantharachne lesserti Giltay, 1930 — Congo
- Acantharachne madecassa Emerit, 2000 — Madagascar
- Acantharachne milloti Emerit, 2000 — Madagascar
- Acantharachne psyche Strand, 1913 — Central Africa
- Acantharachne regalis Hirst, 1925 — Cameroon, Congo
- Acantharachne seydeli Giltay, 1935 — Congo

== Acanthepeira ==
Acanthepeira Marx, 1883

- Acanthepeira cherokee Levi, 1976 — USA
- Acanthepeira labidura (Mello-Leitao, 1943) — Brazil
- Acanthepeira marion Levi, 1976 — USA, Mexico
- Acanthepeira stellata (Walckenaer, 1805) (type species) — Canada to Mexico
- Acanthepeira venusta (Banks, 1896) — USA, Cuba, Hispaniola

== Acroaspis ==
Acroaspis Karsch, 1878

- Acroaspis decorosa (Urquhart, 1894) — New Zealand
- Acroaspis olorina Karsch, 1878 (type species) — Western Australia, New South Wales
- Acroaspis tuberculifera Thorell, 1881 — Queensland

== Acrosomoides ==
Acrosomoides Simon, 1887

- Acrosomoides acrosomoides (O. P.-Cambridge, 1879) — Madagascar
- Acrosomoides linnaei (Walckenaer, 1841) (type species) — West, Central, East Africa
- Acrosomoides tetraedrus (Walckenaer, 1841) — Cameroon, Congo

== Actinacantha ==
Actinacantha Simon, 1864

- Actinacantha globulata (Walckenaer, 1841) — Sumatra, Java

== Actinosoma ==
Actinosoma Holmberg, 1883

- Actinosoma pentacanthum (Walckenaer, 1841) — Colombia to Argentina

== Aculepeira ==
Aculepeira Chamberlin & Ivie, 1942

- Aculepeira aculifera (O. P.-Cambridge, 1889) — USA to Guatemala
- Aculepeira albovittata (Mello-Leitao, 1941) — Paraguay, Argentina
- Aculepeira angeloi Álvares, Loyola & De Maria, 2005 — Brazil
- Aculepeira apa Levi, 1991 — Paraguay
- Aculepeira armida (Audouin, 1826) — Palearctic
  - Aculepeira armida orientalis (Kulczynski, 1901) — Russia, China
  - Aculepeira armida pumila (Simon, 1929) — France
- Aculepeira azul Levi, 1991 — Panama
- Aculepeira busu Levi, 1991 — Hispaniola
- Aculepeira carbonaria (L. Koch, 1869) — Palearctic
  - Aculepeira carbonaria sinensis (Schenkel, 1953) — China
- Aculepeira carbonarioides (Keyserling, 1892) — USA, Canada, Alaska, Russia
- Aculepeira ceropegia (Walckenaer, 1802) — Palearctic
- Aculepeira escazu Levi, 1991 — Costa Rica
- Aculepeira gravabilis (O. P.-Cambridge, 1889) — Honduras to Panama
- Aculepeira lapponica (Holm, 1945) — Sweden, Finland, Russia
- Aculepeira luosangensis Yin et al., 1990 — China
- Aculepeira machu Levi, 1991 — Peru
- Aculepeira matsudae Tanikawa, 1994 — Japan
- Aculepeira morenoae Rubio, Izquierdo & Piacentini, 2013 — Argentina
- Aculepeira packardi (Thorell, 1875) (type species) — North America, Russia, China, Kazakhstan
- Aculepeira serpentina Guo & Zhang, 2010 — China
- Aculepeira taibaishanensis Zhu & Wang, 1995 — China
- Aculepeira talishia (Zawadsky, 1902) — Turkey, Russia, Georgia, Azerbaijan
- Aculepeira travassosi (Soares & Camargo, 1948) — Mexico to Argentina
- Aculepeira visite Levi, 1991 — Hispaniola
- Aculepeira vittata (Gerschman & Schiapelli, 1948) — Brazil, Paraguay, Argentina

== Acusilas ==
Acusilas Simon, 1895

- Acusilas africanus Simon, 1895 — West, Central, East Africa
- Acusilas callidus Schmidt & Scharff, 2008 — Sulawesi
- Acusilas coccineus Simon, 1895 (type species) — China to Moluccas
- Acusilas dahoneus Barrion & Litsinger, 1995 — Philippines
- Acusilas lepidus (Thorell, 1898) — Myanmar
- Acusilas malaccensis Murphy & Murphy, 1983 — Thailand, Laos, Malaysia, Sumatra, Borneo
- Acusilas spiralis Schmidt & Scharff, 2008 — Sumatra
- Acusilas vei Schmidt & Scharff, 2008 — Sulawesi
- Acusilas vilei Schmidt & Scharff, 2008 — Sulawesi

== Aethriscus ==
Aethriscus Pocock, 1902

- Aethriscus olivaceus Pocock, 1902 (type species) — Congo
- Aethriscus pani Lessert, 1930 — Congo

== Aethrodiscus ==
Aethrodiscus Strand, 1913

- Aethrodiscus transversalis Strand, 1913 — Central Africa

== Aetrocantha ==
Aetrocantha Karsch, 1879

- Aetrocantha falkensteini Karsch, 1879 — West, Central Africa

== Afracantha ==
Afracantha Dahl, 1914

- Afracantha camerunensis (Thorell, 1899) — West, Central, East Africa, Venezuela

== Agalenatea ==
Agalenatea Archer, 1951

- Agalenatea liriope (L. Koch, 1875) — Ethiopia, Yemen
- Agalenatea redii (Scopoli, 1763) (type species) — Palearctic

== Alenatea ==
Alenatea Song & Zhu, 1999

- Alenatea fuscocolorata (Bösenberg & Strand, 1906) (type species) — China, Korea, Taiwan, Japan
- Alenatea touxie Song & Zhu, 1999 — China
- Alenatea wangi Zhu & Song, 1999 — China

== Allocyclosa ==
Allocyclosa Levi, 1999

- Allocyclosa bifurca (McCook, 1887) — USA to Panama, Cuba, Hispaniola

== Alpaida ==
Alpaida O. P.-Cambridge, 1889

- Alpaida acuta (Keyserling, 1865) — Panama to Argentina
- Alpaida albocincta (Mello-Leitao, 1945) — Venezuela to Argentina
- Alpaida almada Levi, 1988 — Brazil
- Alpaida alticeps (Keyserling, 1879) — Brazil, Paraguay
- Alpaida alto Levi, 1988 — Paraguay
- Alpaida alvarengai Levi, 1988 — Brazil
- Alpaida amambay Levi, 1988 — Colombia, Paraguay
- Alpaida anchicaya Levi, 1988 — Colombia
- Alpaida angra Levi, 1988 — Brazil
- Alpaida antonio Levi, 1988 — Brazil, Guyana
- Alpaida arvoredo Buckup & Rodrigues, 2011 — Brazil
- Alpaida atomaria (Simon, 1895) — Brazil
- Alpaida banos Levi, 1988 — Colombia, Ecuador
- Alpaida biasii Levi, 1988 — Brazil
- Alpaida bicornuta (Taczanowski, 1878) — Costa Rica to Argentina
- Alpaida bischoffi Levi, 1988 — Brazil
- Alpaida boa Levi, 1988 — Brazil
- Alpaida boraceia Levi, 1988 — Brazil
- Alpaida cachimbo Levi, 1988 — Brazil
- Alpaida cali Levi, 1988 — Colombia
- Alpaida calotypa (Chamberlin, 1916) — Peru
- Alpaida canela Levi, 1988 — Brazil
- Alpaida canoa Levi, 1988 — Brazil
- Alpaida caramba Buckup & Rodrigues, 2011 — Brazil
- Alpaida carminea (Taczanowski, 1878) — Peru, Brazil, Paraguay, Argentina
- Alpaida caxias Levi, 1988 — Brazil
- Alpaida chaco Levi, 1988 — Paraguay
- Alpaida championi (O. P.-Cambridge, 1889) — Guatemala to Colombia
- Alpaida chapada Levi, 1988 — Brazil
- Alpaida chickeringi Levi, 1988 — Panama to Brazil
- Alpaida cisneros Levi, 1988 — Colombia, Ecuador
- Alpaida citrina (Keyserling, 1892) — Brazil
- Alpaida clarindoi Nogueira & Dias, 2015 - Brazil
- Alpaida conica O. P.-Cambridge, 1889 (type species) — Panama
- Alpaida constant Levi, 1988 — Brazil
- Alpaida coroico Levi, 1988 — Bolivia
- Alpaida costai Levi, 1988 — Argentina
- Alpaida cuiaba Levi, 1988 — Brazil
- Alpaida cuyabeno Levi, 1988 — Colombia, Ecuador
- Alpaida darlingtoni Levi, 1988 — Colombia
- Alpaida deborae Levi, 1988 — Brazil, Suriname, French Guiana
- Alpaida delicata (Keyserling, 1892) — Colombia, Peru, Bolivia, Brazil
- Alpaida dominica Levi, 1988 — Lesser Antilles
- Alpaida eberhardi Levi, 1988 — Colombia
- Alpaida elegantula (Archer, 1965) — Martinique
- Alpaida ericae Levi, 1988 — Brazil, Argentina
- Alpaida erythrothorax (Taczanowski, 1873) — French Guiana
- Alpaida gallardoi Levi, 1988 — Brazil, Paraguay, Argentina
- Alpaida gracia Levi, 1988 — Argentina
- Alpaida graphica (O. P.-Cambridge, 1889) — Mexico to Panama
- Alpaida grayi (Blackwall, 1863) — Brazil, Paraguay, Uruguay, Argentina
- Alpaida guimaraes Levi, 1988 — Brazil, Guyana
- Alpaida gurupi Levi, 1988 — Colombia, Brazil
- Alpaida guto Abrahim & Bonaldo, 2008 — Brazil
- Alpaida haligera (Archer, 1971) — Peru, Venezuela
- Alpaida hartliebi Levi, 1988 — Brazil
- Alpaida hoffmanni Levi, 1988 — Brazil, Paraguay
- Alpaida holmbergi Levi, 1988 — Argentina
- Alpaida iguazu Levi, 1988 — Brazil, Argentina
- Alpaida iquitos Levi, 1988 — Peru, Ecuador, Brazil
- Alpaida itacolomi Santos & Santos, 2010 — Brazil
- Alpaida itapua Levi, 1988 — Paraguay
- Alpaida itauba Levi, 1988 — Brazil, Argentina
- Alpaida jacaranda Levi, 1988 — Brazil
- Alpaida kartabo Levi, 1988 — Guyana
- Alpaida keyserlingi Levi, 1988 — Brazil
- Alpaida kochalkai Levi, 1988 — Colombia
- Alpaida lanei Levi, 1988 — Brazil, Argentina
- Alpaida latro (Fabricius, 1775) — Brazil, Uruguay, Paraguay, Argentina
- Alpaida leucogramma (White, 1841) — Panama to Argentina
- Alpaida levii Saturnino, Rodrigues & Bonaldo, 2015 - Brazil
- Alpaida lomba Levi, 1988 — Brazil
- Alpaida losamigos Deza & Andía, 2014 - Peru
- Alpaida lubinae Levi, 1988 — Venezuela
- Alpaida machala Levi, 1988 — Ecuador
- Alpaida madeira Levi, 1988 — Brazil
- Alpaida manicata Levi, 1988 — Colombia, Brazil
- Alpaida marmorata (Taczanowski, 1873) — Ecuador, Peru, French Guiana
- Alpaida marta Levi, 1988 — Colombia
- Alpaida mato Levi, 1988 — Brazil
- Alpaida moata (Chamberlin & Ivie, 1936) — Panama, Colombia
- Alpaida moka Levi, 1988 — Bolivia
- Alpaida monzon Levi, 1988 — Peru
  - Alpaida monzon audiberti Dierkens, 2014 - French Guiana
- Alpaida morro Levi, 1988 — Brazil
- Alpaida muco Levi, 1988 — Colombia
- Alpaida murtinho Levi, 1988 — Brazil
- Alpaida nadleri Levi, 1988 — Venezuela
- Alpaida nancho Levi, 1988 — Peru
- Alpaida narino Levi, 1988 — Colombia
- Alpaida natal Levi, 1988 — Brazil
- Alpaida navicula (L. Koch, 1871) — Brazil
- Alpaida negro Levi, 1988 — Colombia, Brazil
- Alpaida nigrofrenata (Simon, 1895) — Brazil
- Alpaida niveosigillata (Mello-Leitao, 1941) — Colombia, Ecuador
- Alpaida nonoai Levi, 1988 — Brazil
- Alpaida octolobata Levi, 1988 — Brazil, Argentina
- Alpaida oliverioi (Soares & Camargo, 1948) — Brazil
- Alpaida orgaos Levi, 1988 — Brazil
- Alpaida oyapockensis Dierkens, 2014 - French Guiana
- Alpaida pedro Levi, 1988 — Brazil
- Alpaida penca Deza & Andía, 2014 - Peru
- Alpaida picchu Levi, 1988 — Peru
- Alpaida quadrilorata (Simon, 1897) — Brazil, Paraguay, Uruguay, Argentina
- Alpaida queremal Levi, 1988 — Colombia
- Alpaida rioja Levi, 1988 — Brazil, Argentina
- Alpaida rosa Levi, 1988 — Brazil, Argentina
- Alpaida rossi Levi, 1988 — Peru
- Alpaida rostratula (Keyserling, 1892) — Brazil, Argentina
- Alpaida rubellula (Keyserling, 1892) — Brazil, Paraguay, Argentina
- Alpaida sandrei (Simon, 1895) — Brazil
- Alpaida santosi Levi, 1988 — Brazil
- Alpaida schneblei Levi, 1988 — Colombia
- Alpaida scriba (Mello-Leitao, 1940) — Brazil
- Alpaida septemmammata (O. P.-Cambridge, 1889) — Mexico to Argentina
- Alpaida sevilla Levi, 1988 — Colombia
- Alpaida silencio Levi, 1988 — Colombia
- Alpaida simla Levi, 1988 — Trinidad
- Alpaida sobradinho Levi, 1988 — Brazil
- Alpaida sulphurea (Taczanowski, 1873) — French Guiana
- Alpaida sumare Levi, 1988 — Brazil
- Alpaida tabula (Simon, 1895) — Guyana to Bolivia
- Alpaida tayos Levi, 1988 — Ecuador, Peru, Brazil, Guyana
- Alpaida teresinha Braga-Pereira & Santos, 2013 — Brazil
- Alpaida thaxteri Levi, 1988 — Trinidad
- Alpaida tijuca Levi, 1988 — Brazil
- Alpaida toninho Braga-Pereira & Santos, 2013 — Brazil
- Alpaida tonze Santos & Santos, 2010 — Brazil
- Alpaida trilineata (Taczanowski, 1878) — Peru
- Alpaida trispinosa (Keyserling, 1892) — Panama to Argentina
- Alpaida truncata (Keyserling, 1865) — Mexico to Argentina
  - Alpaida truncata obscura (Caporiacco, 1948) — Guyana
  - Alpaida truncata sexmaculata (Caporiacco, 1948) — Guyana
- Alpaida tullgreni (Caporiacco, 1955) — Venezuela
- Alpaida tuonabo (Chamberlin & Ivie, 1936) — Panama
- Alpaida urucuca Levi, 1988 — Brazil
- Alpaida utcuyacu Levi, 1988 — Peru
- Alpaida utiariti Levi, 1988 — Brazil
- Alpaida vanzolinii Levi, 1988 — Peru, Brazil, Argentina
- Alpaida variabilis (Keyserling, 1864) — Colombia
- Alpaida venger Castanheira & Baptista, 2015 - Brazil
- Alpaida veniliae (Keyserling, 1865) — Panama to Argentina
- Alpaida vera Levi, 1988 — Brazil
- Alpaida versicolor (Keyserling, 1877) — Brazil, Paraguay, Uruguay, Argentina
- Alpaida wenzeli (Simon, 1897) — St. Vincent
- Alpaida weyrauchi Levi, 1988 — Peru
- Alpaida yanayacu Saturnino, Rodrigues & Bonaldo, 2015 - Brazil
- Alpaida yotoco Levi, 1988 — Colombia
- Alpaida yucuma Levi, 1988 — Brazil
- Alpaida yungas Levi, 1988 — Bolivia
- Alpaida yuto Levi, 1988 — Paraguay, Argentina

== Amazonepeira ==
Amazonepeira Levi, 1989

- Amazonepeira beno Levi, 1994 — Ecuador, Brazil, Suriname
- Amazonepeira callaria (Levi, 1991) — Peru, Bolivia, Brazil
- Amazonepeira herrera Levi, 1989 (type species) — Peru, Brazil
- Amazonepeira manaus Levi, 1994 — Brazil
- Amazonepeira masaka Levi, 1994 — Ecuador, Brazil

== Anepsion ==
Anepsion Strand, 1929

- Anepsion buchi Chrysanthus, 1969 — New Guinea, Solomon Islands
- Anepsion depressum (Thorell, 1877) — China, Myanmar to Sulawesi
  - Anepsion depressum birmanicum (Thorell, 1895) — Myanmar
- Anepsion fuscolimbatum (Simon, 1901) — Malaysia
- Anepsion hammeni Chrysanthus, 1969 — New Guinea
- Anepsion jacobsoni Chrysanthus, 1961 — Indonesia
- Anepsion japonicum (Bösenberg & Strand, 1906) — China, Japan
- Anepsion maculatum (Thorell, 1897) — Myanmar
- Anepsion maritatum (O. P.-Cambridge, 1877) — Sri Lanka, China to Sulawesi
- Anepsion peltoides (Thorell, 1878) — Australia, New Guinea, Bismarck Archipel
- Anepsion reimoseri Chrysanthus, 1961 — New Guinea
- Anepsion rhomboides (L. Koch, 1867) (type species) — Samoa
- Anepsion roeweri Chrysanthus, 1961 — Taiwan, Philippines, Riouw Islands
- Anepsion semialbum (Simon, 1880) — New Caledonia
- Anepsion villosum (Thorell, 1877) — Sulawesi
- Anepsion wichmanni (Kulczynski, 1911) — New Guinea
- Anepsion wolffi Chrysanthus, 1969 — Solomon Islands

== Arachnura ==
Arachnura Vinson, 1863

- Arachnura angura Tikader, 1970 — India
- Arachnura caudatella Roewer, 1942 — New Guinea, Queensland
- Arachnura feredayi (L. Koch, 1872) — Australia, Tasmania, New Zealand
- Arachnura heptotubercula Yin, Hu & Wang, 1983 — China
- Arachnura higginsi (L. Koch, 1872) — Australia, Tasmania
- Arachnura logio Yaginuma, 1956 — China, Korea, Japan
- Arachnura melanura Simon, 1867 — India to Japan and Sulawesi
- Arachnura perfissa (Thorell, 1895) — Myanmar
- Arachnura pygmaea (Thorell, 1890) — Nias Islands
- Arachnura quinqueapicata Strand, 1911 — Aru Islands
- Arachnura scorpionoides Vinson, 1863 (type species) — Congo, Ethiopia, Madagascar, Mauritius, Seychelles
- Arachnura simoni Berland, 1924 — New Caledonia
- Arachnura spinosa (Saito, 1933) — Taiwan

== Araneus ==
As of September 2025, Araneus Clerck, 1757 includes 535 species and 15 subspecies:

- Araneus abeicus Levi, 1991 – Brazil
- Araneus abigeatus Levi, 1975 – United States
- Araneus acolla Levi, 1991 – Peru
- Araneus acrocephalus (Thorell, 1887) – Myanmar
- Araneus acronotus (Grube, 1861) – Russia (Far East)
- Araneus acropygus (Thorell, 1877) – Indonesia (Sulawesi)
- Araneus acuminatus (L. Koch, 1872) – Australia (Queensland), Solomon Islands
- Araneus adiantiformis Caporiacco, 1941 – Ethiopia
- Araneus adjuntaensis (Petrunkevitch, 1930) – Puerto Rico
- Araneus aethiopicus (Roewer, 1961) – Senegal
- Araneus aethiopissa Simon, 1907 – Senegal, Equatorial Guinea (Bioko)
- Araneus affinis Zhu, Tu & Hu, 1988 – China
- Araneus aksuensis Yin, Xie & Bao, 1996 – China
- Araneus albabdominalis Zhu, J. X. Zhang, Z. S. Zhang & Chen, 2005 – China
- Araneus albiaculeis (Strand, 1906) – Ethiopia
- Araneus albilunatus Roewer, 1961 – Senegal
- Araneus albomaculatus Yin, Wang, Xie & Peng, 1990 – China
- Araneus alboquadratus Dyal, 1935 – Pakistan
- Araneus albotriangulus (Keyserling, 1887) – Australia (Queensland, New South Wales)
- Araneus alboventris (Emerton, 1884) – Canada, United States
- Araneus alhue Levi, 1991 – Chile, Argentina
- Araneus allani Levi, 1973 – United States
- Araneus alsine (Walckenaer, 1802) – Europe, Turkey, Caucasus, Russia (Europe to Far East), Kazakhstan, Japan
- Araneus altitudinum Caporiacco, 1934 – Pakistan (Karakorum)
- Araneus amygdalaceus (Keyserling, 1864) – Mauritius
- Araneus ana Levi, 1991 – Costa Rica
- Araneus anantnagensis Tikader & Bal, 1981 – India
- Araneus anaspastus (Thorell, 1893) – Singapore
- Araneus ancurus Zhu, Tu & Hu, 1988 – China
- Araneus andrewsi (Archer, 1951) – United States
- Araneus anguinifer (F. O. Pickard-Cambridge, 1904) – Mexico, Costa Rica
- Araneus angulatus Clerck, 1757 – Europe, North Africa, Turkey, Russia (Europe to Far East), Iran, Central Asia, Korea (type species)
  - Araneus angulatus personatus Simon, 1929 – Spain, France
- Araneus anjonensis Schenkel, 1963 – China
- Araneus annuliger (Thorell, 1898) – Myanmar
- Araneus apache Levi, 1975 – United States
- Araneus apicalis (Thorell, 1899) – Cameroon
- Araneus apiculatus (Thorell, 1895) – Myanmar
- Araneus appendiculatus (Taczanowski, 1873) – French Guiana
- Araneus apricus (Karsch, 1884) – São Tomé, Tanzania, Zambia, Namibia, Botswana, Zimbabwe, South Africa, Eswatini, Seychelles, Yemen (mainland, Socotra)
- Araneus aragua Levi, 2008 – Venezuela
- Araneus arfakianus (Thorell, 1881) – Indonesia (New Guinea)
- Araneus argentatus (Provancher, 1895) – Trinidad
- Araneus arizonensis (Banks, 1900) – United States, Mexico
- Araneus asiaticus Bakhvalov, 1983 – Kyrgyzstan
- Araneus aubertorum Berland, 1938 – Vanuatu
- Araneus aurantiifemuris (Mello-Leitão, 1942) – Argentina
- Araneus auriculatus Song & Zhu, 1992 – China
- Araneus axacus Levi, 1991 – Mexico
- Araneus badiofoliatus Schenkel, 1963 – China
- Araneus badongensis Song & Zhu, 1992 – China
- Araneus baicalicus Bakhvalov, 1981 – Russia (South Siberia)
- Araneus balanus (Doleschall, 1859) – Indonesia (Ambon)
- Araneus bandelieri (Simon, 1891) – Venezuela, Brazil
- Araneus bantaengi Merian, 1911 – Indonesia (Sulawesi)
- Araneus bargusinus Bakhvalov, 1981 – Russia (South Siberia)
- Araneus basalteus Schenkel, 1936 – China
- Araneus bastarensis Gajbe, 2005 – India
- Araneus baul Levi, 1991 – Mexico
- Araneus beebei Petrunkevitch, 1914 – Myanmar
- Araneus beijiangensis Hu & Wu, 1989 – China
- Araneus bicavus Zhu & Wang, 1994 – China
- Araneus bicentenarius (McCook, 1888) – Canada, United States
- Araneus bidentatoides Mi & Li, 2022 – China
- Araneus bidentatus Mi & Li, 2022 – China
- Araneus bigibbosus (O. Pickard-Cambridge, 1885) – Pakistan
- Araneus bihamulus Zhu, J. X. Zhang, Z. S. Zhang & Chen, 2005 – China
- Araneus biloculatus Qin, Mi & Liu, 2024 – China
- Araneus bilunifer Pocock, 1900 – India
- Araneus bimaculicollis Hu, 2001 – China
- Araneus bimini Levi, 1991 – Bahama Is.
- Araneus biprominens Yin, Wang & Xie, 1989 – China
- Araneus bipunctatus (Thorell, 1898) – Myanmar
- Araneus bispinosus (Keyserling, 1885) – United States
- Araneus bivittatus (Walckenaer, 1841) – United States
- Araneus blackwalli Sherwood, 2021 – Madeira
- Araneus blaisei Simon, 1909 – Vietnam
- Araneus blumenau Levi, 1991 – Brazil, Uruguay, Argentina
- Araneus boerneri (Strand, 1907) – India
- Araneus boesenbergi (Fox, 1938) – China
- Araneus bogotensis (Keyserling, 1864) – Colombia, Bolivia and Brazil
- Araneus bonali Morano, 2018 – Spain
- Araneus boneti Levi, 1991 – Mexico
- Araneus bonsallae (McCook, 1894) – United States
- Araneus borealis Tanikawa, 2001 – China, Japan
- Araneus boreus Uyemura & Yaginuma, 1972 – Japan
- Araneus bosmani Simon, 1903 – Equatorial Guinea
- Araneus breviscapus Liu, Li, Mi & Peng, 2022 – China
- Araneus bryantae Brignoli, 1983 – Hispaniola
- Araneus bufo (Denis, 1941) – Canary Islands
- Araneus caballo Levi, 1991 – Mexico
- Araneus calusa Levi, 1973 – United States
- Araneus camilla (Simon, 1889) – Pakistan, India
- Araneus canacus Berland, 1931 – New Caledonia
- Araneus carabellus (Strand, 1913) – DR Congo
- Araneus carchi Levi, 1991 – Ecuador
- Araneus cardioceros Pocock, 1899 – Yemen (Socotra)
- Araneus carimagua Levi, 1991 – Colombia
- Araneus carnifex (O. Pickard-Cambridge, 1885) – Pakistan
- Araneus carroll Levi, 1973 – United States
- Araneus castilho Levi, 1991 – Brazil
- Araneus catillatus (Thorell, 1895) – Myanmar
- Araneus catospilotus Simon, 1907 – Guinea-Bissau, São Tomé and Príncipe, Democratic Republic of the Congo
- Araneus caudifer Kulczyński, 1911 – Papua New Guinea
- Araneus cavaticus (Keyserling, 1881) – Canada, United States
- Araneus celebensis Merian, 1911 – Indonesia (Sulawesi)
- Araneus cercidius Yin, Wang, Xie & Peng, 1990 – China
- Araneus cereolus (Simon, 1886) – Senegal, Cameroon, Ethiopia
- Araneus chenjingi Mi, Wang & Gan, 2023 – China
- Araneus chiapas Levi, 1991 – Mexico
- Araneus chiaramontei Caporiacco, 1940 – Ethiopia
- Araneus chingaza Levi, 1991 – Colombia
- Araneus chunhuaia Zhu, Tu & Hu, 1988 – China
- Araneus chunlin Yin, Griswold, Yan & Liu, 2009 – China
- Araneus cingulatus (Walckenaer, 1841) – United States
- Araneus circe (Audouin, 1826) – Southern Europe, Tunisia, Egypt, Turkey, Caucasus, Iran
- Araneus circellus Song & Zhu, 1992 – China
- Araneus circulissparsus (Keyserling, 1887) – Australia (New South Wales)
- Araneus circumbasilaris Yin, Wang, Xie & Peng, 1990 – China
- Araneus coccinella Pocock, 1898 – South Africa
- Araneus cochise Levi, 1973 – United States
- Araneus cohnae Levi, 1991 – Brazil
- Araneus colima Levi, 1991 – Mexico
- Araneus colubrinus Song & Zhu, 1992 – China
- Araneus complanatus Mi & Li, 2022 – China
- Araneus compsus (Soares & Camargo, 1948) – Brazil
- Araneus comptus Rainbow, 1916 – Australia (Queensland)
  - Araneus comptus fuscocapitatus Rainbow, 1916 – Australia (Queensland)
- Araneus concepcion Levi, 1991 – Chile
- Araneus concoloratus (F. O. Pickard-Cambridge, 1904) – Panama
- Araneus conexus Liu, Irfan, Yang & Peng, 2019 – China
- Araneus corbita (L. Koch, 1871) – Samoa
- Araneus corporosus (Keyserling, 1892) – Brazil, Argentina
- Araneus corrugis Mi & Li, 2022 – China
- Araneus corticaloides (Roewer, 1955) – France (Corsica)
- Araneus corticarius (Emerton, 1884) – Russia (northeast Siberia), Alaska, Canada, United States
- Araneus crispulus Tullgren, 1952 – Sweden
- Araneus cristobal Levi, 1991 – Mexico
- Araneus cucullatus Mi & Li, 2022 – China
- Araneus cuiaba Levi, 1991 – Brazil, Argentina
- Araneus cyclops Caporiacco, 1940 – Ethiopia
- Araneus cylindriformis (Roewer, 1942) – Guatemala
- Araneus cyrtarachnoides (Keyserling, 1887) – New Guinea (Indonesia, Papua New Guinea), Australia (New South Wales)
- Araneus daozhenensis Zhu, J. X. Zhang, Z. S. Zhang & Chen, 2005 – China
- Araneus dayongensis Yin, Wang, Xie & Peng, 1990 – China
- Araneus decaisnei (Lucas, 1863) – Philippines
- Araneus decentellus (Strand, 1907) – India, China
- Araneus decoratus (Thorell, 1899) – Cameroon
- Araneus demoniacus Caporiacco, 1939 – Ethiopia
- Araneus depressatulus (Roewer, 1942) – Papua New Guinea
- Araneus desierto Levi, 1991 – Mexico
- Araneus detrimentosus (O. Pickard-Cambridge, 1889) – United States, Colombia
- Araneus diadematoides Zhu, Tu & Hu, 1988 – China
- Araneus diadematus Clerck, 1757 – Europe, Middle East, Turkey, Caucasus, Russia (Europe to Far East), Iran, Central Asia, China, Japan. Introduced to North America
- Araneus diffinis Zhu, Tu & Hu, 1988 – China
- Araneus digitatus Liu, Irfan, Yang & Peng, 2019 – China
- Araneus doenitzellus (Strand, 1906) – Japan, Taiwan
- Araneus dofleini (Bösenberg & Strand, 1906) – Japan
- Araneus dospinolongus Barrion & Litsinger, 1995 – Philippines
- Araneus dreisbachi Levi, 1991 – Mexico
- Araneus ealensis Giltay, 1935 – Congo
- Araneus eburneiventris (Simon, 1908) – Australia (Western Australia)
- Araneus elatatus (Strand, 1911) – Indonesia (Kei Is, Aru Is.)
- Araneus elizabethae Levi, 1991 – Hispaniola
- Araneus elongatus Yin, Wang & Xie, 1989 – China
- Araneus emmae Simon, 1900 – Hawaii
- Araneus enyoides (Thorell, 1877) – Indonesia (Sulawesi)
- Araneus expletus (O. Pickard-Cambridge, 1889) – Mexico, Panama
- Araneus falcatus Guo, Zhang & Zhu, 2011 – China
- Araneus faxoni (Bryant, 1940) – Cuba
- Araneus fengshanensis Zhu & Song, 1994 – China
- Araneus fenzhi Mi & Wang, 2023 – China (Hainan)
- Araneus ferganicus Bakhvalov, 1983 – Kyrgyzstan
- Araneus ferrugineus (Thorell, 1877) – Indonesia (Sulawesi)
- Araneus finneganae Berland, 1938 – Vanuatu
- Araneus flagelliformis Zhu & Yin, 1998 – China
- Araneus flavisternis (Thorell, 1878) – Indonesia (Ambon, New Guinea)
  - Araneus flavisternis momiensis (Thorell, 1881) – Indonesia (New Guinea)
- Araneus flavosellatus Simon, 1895 – Brazil
- Araneus flavosignatus (Roewer, 1942) – Indonesia (Sulawesi)
- Araneus flavus (O. Pickard-Cambridge, 1894) – Mexico, Nicaragua
- Araneus floriformis Liu, Li, Mi & Peng, 2022 – China
- Araneus formosellus (Roewer, 1942) – Pakistan
- Araneus frio Levi, 1991 – Mexico
- Araneus fronki Levi, 1991 – Brazil
- Araneus fulvellus (Roewer, 1942) – Pakistan, India
- Araneus gadus Levi, 1973 – United States
- Araneus galero Levi, 1991 – Panama, Colombia
- Araneus geminatus (Thorell, 1881) – Indonesia (New Guinea)
- Araneus gemma (McCook, 1888) – Alaska, Canada, United States
- Araneus gemmoides Chamberlin & Ivie, 1935 – Canada, United States
- Araneus gerais Levi, 1991 – Brazil
- Araneus gestrellus (Strand, 1907) – Indonesia (Moluccas)
- Araneus gestroi (Thorell, 1881) – Papua New Guinea
- Araneus gibber (O. Pickard-Cambridge, 1885) – Pakistan, India
- Araneus ginninderranus Dondale, 1966 – Australian Capital Territory
- Araneus goniaea (Thorell, 1878) – Myanmar, Indonesia (Java, Ambon, New Guinea)
  - Araneus goniaea virens (Thorell, 1890) – Indonesia (Sumatra)
- Araneus goniaeoides (Strand, 1915) – Indonesia (Lombok)
- Araneus graemii Pocock, 1900 – South Africa
- Araneus granadensis (Keyserling, 1864) – Venezuela, Peru
- Araneus gratiolus Yin, Wang, Xie & Peng, 1990 – China
- Araneus groenlandicola (Strand, 1906) – Canada, United States, Greenland
- Araneus grossus (C. L. Koch, 1844) – Europe, Central Asia
- Araneus guandishanensis Zhu, Tu & Hu, 1988 – China
- Araneus guatemus Levi, 1991 – Guatemala
- Araneus guerrerensis Chamberlin & Ivie, 1936 – United States, Mexico
- Araneus guessfeldi (Karsch, 1879) – West Africa
- Araneus gundlachi (Banks, 1914) – Cuba
- Araneus gurdus (O. Pickard-Cambridge, 1885) – Pakistan
- Araneus guttatus (Keyserling, 1865) – Costa Rica, Argentina
- Araneus guttulatus (Walckenaer, 1841) – Canada, United States
- Araneus habilis (O. Pickard-Cambridge, 1889) – Mexico, Guatemala
- Araneus haematomerus (Gerstaecker, 1873) – Central Africa
- Araneus hampei Simon, 1895 – Indonesia (Java)
- Araneus haploscapellus (Strand, 1907) – South Africa
- Araneus haruspex (O. Pickard-Cambridge, 1885) – China (Yarkand)
- Araneus herbeus (Thorell, 1890) – Indonesia (Sumatra)
- Araneus hierographicus Simon, 1909 – Vietnam
- Araneus himalayanus (Simon, 1889) – India
- Araneus hirsti Lessert, 1915 – Tanzania
- Araneus hirsutulus (Stoliczka, 1869) – India
- Araneus hispaniola (Bryant, 1945) – Hispaniola
- Araneus horizonte Levi, 1991 – Colombia, Paraguay
- Araneus hoshi Tanikawa, 2001 – Japan
- Araneus hotteiensis (Bryant, 1945) – Hispaniola
- Araneus huahun Levi, 1991 – Chile, Argentina
- Araneus hui Hu, 2001 – China
- Araneus huixtla Levi, 1991 – Mexico
- Araneus iguacu Levi, 1991 – Brazil, Argentina
- Araneus ikedai (Kishida, 1909) – Japan
- Araneus illaudatus (Gertsch & Mulaik, 1936) – United States, Mexico
- Araneus indistinctus (Doleschall, 1859) – Indonesia (Java)
- Araneus interjectus (L. Koch, 1871) – Australia (Queensland)
- Araneus iriomotensis Tanikawa, 2001 – Japan
- Araneus ishisawai Kishida, 1928 – Russia (Far East), Korea, Japan
- Araneus iviei (Archer, 1951) – Alaska, Canada, United States
- Araneus jalisco Levi, 1991 – Mexico
- Araneus jamundi Levi, 1991 – Colombia
- Araneus juniperi (Emerton, 1884) – Canada, United States
- Araneus kalaharensis Simon, 1910 – Botswana
- Araneus kapiolaniae Simon, 1900 – Hawaii
- Araneus karissimbicus (Strand, 1913) – Central Africa
- Araneus kerr Levi, 1981 – United States
- Araneus khingan Zhou, Zhu & Zhang, 2017 – China
- Araneus kirgisikus Bakhvalov, 1974 – Kyrgyzstan
- Araneus kiwuanus (Strand, 1913) – Central Africa
- Araneus klaptoczi Simon, 1908 – Libya
- Araneus koepckeorum Levi, 1991 – Peru
- Araneus komi Tanikawa, 2001 – Japan
- Araneus kraepelini (Lenz, 1891) – Madagascar
- Araneus lanio Levi, 1991 – Mexico
- Araneus lateriguttatus (Karsch, 1879) – West Africa
- Araneus lathyrinus (Holmberg, 1875) – Brazil, Paraguay, Argentina
- Araneus latirostris (Thorell, 1895) – Myanmar
- Araneus lechugalensis (Keyserling, 1883) – Peru
- Araneus lenkoi Levi, 1991 – Brazil
- Araneus lenzi (Roewer, 1942) – Madagascar
- Araneus leones Levi, 1991 – Mexico
- Araneus liae Yin, Griswold, Yan & Liu, 2009 – China
- Araneus liami Mi, Li & Pham, 2023 – Vietnam
- Araneus liber (Leardi, 1902) – India
- Araneus liberalis Rainbow, 1902 – Australia (New South Wales)
- Araneus liberiae (Strand, 1906) – Liberia
- Araneus licenti Schenkel, 1953 – China
- Araneus lihaiboi Mi, Wang & Gan, 2023 – China
- Araneus lineatipes (O. Pickard-Cambridge, 1889) – Mexico, Honduras
- Araneus linshuensis Yin, Wang, Xie & Peng, 1990 – China
- Araneus lintatus Levi, 1991 – Peru
- Araneus linzhiensis Hu, 2001 – China
- Araneus lixicolor (Thorell, 1895) – Myanmar
- Araneus loczyanus (Lendl, 1898) – China
- Araneus longicauda (Thorell, 1877) – Indonesia (Sulawesi)
- Araneus luteofaciens (Roewer, 1942) – Cameroon
- Araneus macacus Uyemura, 1961 – Russia (Far East), Japan
- Araneus macleayi (Bradley, 1876) – Papua New Guinea, Australia (Queensland)
- Araneus mammatus (Archer, 1951) – United States
- Araneus mangarevoides (Bösenberg & Strand, 1906) – Japan, China
- Araneus margaritae Caporiacco, 1940 – Ethiopia
- Araneus margitae (Strand, 1917) – Madagascar
- Araneus mariposa Levi, 1973 – United States
- Araneus marmoreus Clerck, 1757 – North America, Europe, Turkey, Caucasus, Russia (Europe to Far East), Iran, Central Asia, India, China, Korea, Japan
- Araneus marmoroides Schenkel, 1953 – China
- Araneus masculus Caporiacco, 1941 – Ethiopia
- Araneus masoni (Simon, 1887) – Myanmar
- Araneus matogrosso Levi, 1991 – Brazil
- Araneus matsumotoi Suzuki & Tanikawa, 2021 – Japan
- Araneus mauensis Caporiacco, 1949 – Kenya
  - Araneus mauensis ocellatus Caporiacco, 1949 – Kenya
- Araneus mayanghe Mi & Wang, 2023 – China (Hainan)
- Araneus mayumiae Tanikawa, 2001 – Korea, Japan
- Araneus mazamitla Levi, 1991 – Mexico
- Araneus mbogaensis (Strand, 1913) – Central Africa
- Araneus memoryi Hogg, 1900 – Australia (Victoria)
- Araneus mendoza Levi, 1991 – Mexico
- Araneus menglunensis Yin, Wang, Xie & Peng, 1990 – Russia (Far East), China
- Araneus meropes (Keyserling, 1865) – Colombia, Argentina
- Araneus mertoni (Strand, 1911) – Indonesia (Kei Is.)
- Araneus metalis (Thorell, 1887) – Myanmar
- Araneus miami Levi, 1973 – United States
- Araneus microsoma (Banks, 1909) – Costa Rica
- Araneus microtuberculatus Petrunkevitch, 1914 – Myanmar
- Araneus mimosicola (Simon, 1884) – Sudan
- Araneus minahassae Merian, 1911 – Indonesia (Sulawesi)
- Araneus miniatus (Walckenaer, 1841) – United States
- Araneus minisculus Mi & Li, 2022 – China
- Araneus minutalis (Simon, 1889) – India
- Araneus miquanensis Yin, Wang, Xie & Peng, 1990 – Russia (Far East), China
- Araneus missouri Levi, 2008 – United States
- Araneus monica Levi, 1973 – United States
- Araneus monoceros (Thorell, 1895) – Myanmar
- Araneus montereyensis (Archer, 1951) – North America
- Araneus moretonae Levi, 1991 – Peru
- Araneus morulus (Thorell, 1898) – Myanmar
- Araneus mossambicanus (Pavesi, 1881) – Mozambique
- Araneus motuoensis Yin, Wang, Xie & Peng, 1990 – China
- Araneus musawas Levi, 1991 – Nicaragua
- Araneus myurus (Thorell, 1877) – Indonesia (Sulawesi)
- Araneus nacional Levi, 1991 – Mexico
- Araneus nashoba Levi, 1973 – United States
- Araneus nephelodes (Thorell, 1890) – Indonesia
- Araneus nidus Yin & Gong, 1996 – China
- Araneus nigricaudus Simon, 1897 – Vietnam
- Araneus nigroflavornatus Merian, 1911 – Indonesia (Sulawesi)
- Araneus nigropunctatus (L. Koch, 1871) – Australia (Queensland), Tahiti
- Araneus nigroquadratus Lawrence, 1937 – Namibia, South Africa
- Araneus niveus (Hentz, 1847) – United States
- Araneus nojimai Tanikawa, 2001 – Russia (Far East), Japan
- Araneus nordmanni (Thorell, 1870) – North America, Europe, Caucasus, Kazakhstan, Russia (Europe to Far East), Korea, Japan
- Araneus noumeensis (Simon, 1880) – New Caledonia
- Araneus novaepommerianae (Strand, 1913) – Papua New Guinea (Bismarck Arch.)
- Araneus nox (Simon, 1877) – Myanmar, Indonesia (Sumatra, Sulawesi, Moluccas), Philippines
- Araneus nuboso Levi, 1991 – Costa Rica
- Araneus obscurissimus Caporiacco, 1934 – Pakistan (Karakorum)
- Araneus obtusatus (Karsch, 1892) – Sri Lanka
- Araneus ocaxa Levi, 1991 – Mexico
- Araneus ogatai Tanikawa, 2001 – Korea, Japan
- Araneus omnicolor (Keyserling, 1893) – Brazil, Paraguay, Argentina
- Araneus orgaos Levi, 1991 – Brazil
- Araneus origena (Thorell, 1890) – Myanmar, Indonesia (Sumatra)
- Araneus ovoideus Mi & Li, 2022 – China
- Araneus oxygaster Caporiacco, 1940 – Ethiopia
- Araneus oxyurus (Thorell, 1877) – Myanmar, Indonesia (Sulawesi)
- Araneus paenulatus (O. Pickard-Cambridge, 1885) – Pakistan
- Araneus pahalgaonensis Tikader & Bal, 1981 – India, China
- Araneus paitaensis Schenkel, 1953 – China
- Araneus pallasi (Thorell, 1875) – Ukraine, Turkey, Russia, (Europe), China
- Araneus pallescens (Lenz, 1891) – Madagascar
- Araneus pallidus (Olivier, 1789) – Portugal, Spain, France, Algeria
- Araneus panchganiensis Tikader & Bal, 1981 – India
- Araneus panniferens (O. Pickard-Cambridge, 1885) – Pakistan, India
- Araneus papilioformis Qin, Mi & Liu, 2024 – China
- Araneus papulatus (Thorell, 1887) – Myanmar, Malaysia
- Araneus partitus (Walckenaer, 1841) – United States
- Araneus parvulus Rainbow, 1900 – Australia (New South Wales)
- Araneus parvus (Karsch, 1878) – Australia (South Australia)
- Araneus pauxillus (Thorell, 1887) – Myanmar
- Araneus pavlovi Schenkel, 1953 – China
- Araneus pecuensis (Karsch, 1881) – Russia (Far East), China
- Araneus pegnia (Walckenaer, 1841) – United States, [Ecuador and Jamaica
- Araneus pellax (O. Pickard-Cambridge, 1885) – Pakistan, India
- Araneus penai Levi, 1991 – Ecuador
- Araneus perincertus Caporiacco, 1947 – Eritrea
- Araneus petersi (Karsch, 1878) – Ethiopia, Mozambique
- Araneus pfeifferae (Thorell, 1877) – Indonesia (Java, Sulawesi)
- Araneus phlyctogena Simon, 1907 – Guinea-Bissau, Equatorial Guinea (Bioko), Congo
- Araneus phyllonotus (Thorell, 1887) – Myanmar
- Araneus pianmaensis Liu, Li, Mi & Peng, 2022 – China
- Araneus pichoni Schenkel, 1963 – China
- Araneus pico Levi, 1991 – Brazil
- Araneus pictithorax (van Hasselt, 1882) – Indonesia (Sumatra)
- Araneus pinguis (Karsch, 1879) – Russia (Far East), China, Korea, Japan
- Araneus pistiger Simon, 1899 – Indonesia (Sumatra)
- Araneus pius (Karsch, 1878) – Australia (New South Wales)
- Araneus plenus Yin, Griswold, Yan & Liu, 2009 – China
- Araneus pogisa (Marples, 1957) – Samoa
- Araneus poltyoides Chrysanthus, 1971 – Indonesia (New Guinea)
- Araneus polydentatus Yin, Griswold & Xu, 2007 – China
- Araneus pontii Caporiacco, 1934 – Pakistan (Karakorum)
- Araneus popaco Levi, 1991 – Mexico
- Araneus poumotuus (Strand, 1913) – Polynesia
- Araneus praedatus (O. Pickard-Cambridge, 1885) – Pakistan, India
- Araneus prasius (Thorell, 1890) – Indonesia (Java)
- Araneus pratensis (Emerton, 1884) – Canada, United States
- Araneus principis Simon, 1907 – São Tomé and Príncipe
- Araneus prospiciens (Thorell, 1890) – Indonesia (Sumatra)
- Araneus providens Kulczyński, 1911 – Indonesia (New Guinea)
- Araneus prunus Levi, 1973 – United States
- Araneus pseudoconicus Schenkel, 1936 – China
- Araneus pseudodigitatus Mi & Li, 2022 – China
- Araneus pseudosturmii Yin, Wang, Xie & Peng, 1990 – China
- Araneus pseudoventricosus Schenkel, 1963 – China
- Araneus psittacinus (Keyserling, 1887) – Australia (New South Wales, Victoria)
- Araneus pudicus (Thorell, 1898) – Myanmar
- Araneus puebla Levi, 1991 – Mexico
- Araneus pulcherrimus (Roewer, 1942) – Austria?
- Araneus pulchriformis (Roewer, 1942) – Australia (New South Wales)
- Araneus pupulus (Thorell, 1890) – Indonesia (Java, Ambon)
- Araneus purus (Simon, 1907) – West Africa
- Araneus quadratus Clerck, 1757 – Europe, Turkey, Russia (Europe to Far East), Iran, Central Asia, China, Japan. Introduced to St. Helena
- Araneus quietus (Keyserling, 1887) – Australia
- Araneus quirapan Levi, 1991 – Mexico
- Araneus rabiosulus (Keyserling, 1887) – Australia (New South Wales)
- Araneus radja (Doleschall, 1857) – Indonesia (Ambon, Aru Is.), Papua New Guinea (Yule Is.)
- Araneus rainbowi (Roewer, 1942) – Australia (Lord Howe Is.)
- Araneus ramulosus (Keyserling, 1887) – Australia
- Araneus rani (Thorell, 1881) – Australia (Queensland)
- Araneus reizan Tanikawa, 2020 – Japan
- Araneus relicinus (Keyserling, 1887) – Solomon Is. Bismarck Arch.
- Araneus repetecus Bakhvalov, 1978 – Turkmenistan
- Araneus roseomaculatus Ono, 1992 – Taiwan
- Araneus rotundicornis Yaginuma, 1972 – Korea, Japan
- Araneus rotundulus (Keyserling, 1887) – Australia (Queensland)
- Araneus royi Roewer, 1961 – Senegal
- Araneus rubrivitticeps (Strand, 1911) – Indonesia (Aru Is.)
- Araneus rufipes (O. Pickard-Cambridge, 1889) – Guatemala
- Araneus rumiae Biswas & Raychaudhuri, 2013 – Bangladesh
- Araneus ryukyuanus Tanikawa, 2001 – Russia (Far East), Japan
- Araneus saevus (L. Koch, 1872) – North America, Europe, Russia (Far East)
- Araneus sagicola (Dönitz & Strand, 1906) – Japan
- Araneus salto Levi, 1991 – Mexico
- Araneus sambava (Strand, 1907) – Madagascar, Yemen
- Araneus santacruziensis Barrion & Litsinger, 1995 – Philippines
- Araneus santarita (Archer, 1951) – United States
- Araneus savesi (Simon, 1880) – New Caledonia
- Araneus schneblei Levi, 1991 – Colombia
- Araneus schrencki (Grube, 1861) – Russia (Far East)
- Araneus scutellatus Schenkel, 1963 – China
- Araneus selva Levi, 1991 – Guatemala, Costa Rica
- Araneus seminiger (L. Koch, 1878) – Korea, Japan, China
- Araneus semiorbiculatus Mi & Li, 2022 – China
- Araneus separatus (Roewer, 1942) – Australia (New South Wales)
- Araneus septemtuberculatus (Thorell, 1899) – Cameroon
- Araneus sernai Levi, 1991 – Colombia
- Araneus shii Mi, Wang & Gan, 2023 – China
- Araneus shiwandashan Mi & Wang, 2023 – China
- Araneus shunhuangensis Yin, Wang, Xie & Peng, 1990 – China
- Araneus sicki Levi, 1991 – Brazil
- Araneus simillimus Kulczyński, 1911 – Indonesia (New Guinea)
- Araneus sinistrellus (Roewer, 1942) – Mexico
- Araneus spathurus (Thorell, 1890) – Indonesia (Sumatra)
- Araneus speculabundus (L. Koch, 1871) – Australia, Samoa
- Araneus sponsus (Thorell, 1887) – India
- Araneus squamifer (Keyserling, 1886) – Australia (Queensland)
- Araneus stabilis (Keyserling, 1893) – Brazil, Argentina
- Araneus stella (Karsch, 1879) – Russia (Far East), China, Korea, Japan
- Araneus stolidus (Keyserling, 1887) – Australia (New South Wales)
- Araneus strandiellus Charitonov, 1951 – Central Asia (Russia, Kazakhstan, Uzbekistan, Tajikistan)
- Araneus striatipes (Simon, 1877) – Philippines
- Araneus strupifer (Simon, 1886) – Senegal, Kenya, Tanzania, Botswana, South Africa
- Araneus sturmi (Hahn, 1831) – Europe, Turkey, Russia (Europe to Far East), Central Asia, China
- Araneus subumbrosus Roewer, 1961 – Senegal
- Araneus sulfurinus (Pavesi, 1883) – Ethiopia, Tanzania
- Araneus svanetiensis Mcheidze, 1997 – Georgia
- Araneus taigunensis Zhu, Tu & Hu, 1988 – China
- Araneus talasi Bakhvalov, 1970 – Kyrgyzstan
- Araneus talca Levi, 1991 – Chile, Argentina
- Araneus talipedatus (Keyserling, 1887) – Australia
- Araneus tambopata Levi, 1991 – Peru
- Araneus tamerlani (Roewer, 1942) – Australia (Queensland)
- Araneus taperae (Mello-Leitão, 1937) – Ecuador, Suriname
- Araneus tartaricus (Kroneberg, 1875) – Kazakhstan, Korea
- Araneus tatianae Lessert, 1938 – Congo, South Africa
- Araneus tatsulokeus Barrion & Litsinger, 1995 – Philippines
- Araneus tellezi Levi, 1991 – Mexico
- Araneus tenancingo Levi, 1991 – Mexico
- Araneus tenerius Yin, Wang, Xie & Peng, 1990 – China
- Araneus tengxianensis Zhu & Zhang, 1994 – China
- Araneus tepic Levi, 1991 – Mexico
- Araneus tetracanthus Mi & Li, 2022 – China
- Araneus tetraspinulus (Yin, Wang, Xie & Peng, 1990) – China
- Araneus texanus (Archer, 1951) – United States
- Araneus thaddeus (Hentz, 1847) – North America
- Araneus thevenoti Simon, 1895 – Tanzania (Zanzibar)
- Araneus thorelli (Roewer, 1942) – Myanmar
- Araneus tiganus (Chamberlin, 1916) – Ecuador, Peru
- Araneus tijuca Levi, 1991 – Brazil
- Araneus tinikdikitus Barrion & Litsinger, 1995 – Philippines
- Araneus titirus Simon, 1896 – Chile, Argentina
- Araneus toma (Strand, 1915) – Papua New Guinea (Bismarck Arch.)
- Araneus tonkinus Simon, 1909 – Vietnam
- Araneus toruaigiri Bakhvalov, 1970 – Kyrgyzstan
- Araneus triangulus (Fox, 1938) – China
- Araneus tricoloratus Zhu, Tu & Hu, 1988 – China
- Araneus trifolium (Hentz, 1847) – Alaska, Canada, United States
- Araneus trigonophorus (Thorell, 1887) – Myanmar
- Araneus triguttatus (Fabricius, 1775) – Europe, Turkey, Caucasus, Central Asia (Russia)
- Araneus tschuiskii Bakhvalov, 1974 – Kyrgyzstan
- Araneus tsurusakii Tanikawa, 2001 – Russia (Far East), Korea, Japan
- Araneus tubabdominus Zhu & Zhang, 1993 – India, China
- Araneus tuscarora Levi, 1973 – United States
- Araneus ubicki Levi, 1991 – Costa Rica
- Araneus unanimus (Keyserling, 1879) – Brazil, Paraguay, Argentina
- Araneus uniformis (Keyserling, 1879) – Bolivia, Brazil, Paraguay, Uruguay, Argentina
- Araneus ursimorphus (Strand, 1906) – Ethiopia, East Africa
- Araneus uruapan Levi, 1991 – Mexico
- Araneus urubamba Levi, 1991 – Peru
- Araneus usualis (Keyserling, 1887) – Australia (Queensland, New South Wales)
- Araneus uyemurai Yaginuma, 1960 – Russia (Far East), Korea, Japan
- Araneus variegatus Yaginuma, 1960 – Russia (Far East), China, Korea, Japan
- Araneus varpunen Sen, Dhali, Saha & Raychaudhuri, 2015 – India
- Araneus varus (Kauri, 1950) – South Africa
- Araneus venatrix (C. L. Koch, 1838) – Panama and Trinidad, Paraguay
- Araneus ventricosus (L. Koch, 1878) – Russia (Far East), Korea, Japan, China, Taiwan
  - Araneus ventricosus abikonus Uyemura, 1961 – Japan
  - Araneus ventricosus globulus Uyemura, 1961 – Japan
  - Araneus ventricosus hakonensis Uyemura, 1961 – Japan
  - Araneus ventricosus ishinodai Uyemura, 1961 – Japan
  - Araneus ventricosus kishuensis Uyemura, 1961 – Japan
  - Araneus ventricosus montanioides Uyemura, 1961 – Japan
  - Araneus ventricosus montanus Uyemura, 1961 – Japan
  - Araneus ventricosus nigelloides Uyemura, 1961 – Japan
  - Araneus ventricosus nigellus Uyemura, 1961 – Japan
  - Araneus ventricosus yaginumai Uyemura, 1961 – Japan
- Araneus vermimaculatus Zhu & Wang, 1994 – China
- Araneus villa Levi, 1991 – Bolivia
- Araneus vincibilis (Keyserling, 1893) – Brazil, Paraguay, Argentina
- Araneus viperifer Schenkel, 1963 – China, Korea, Japan
- Araneus virgunculus (Thorell, 1890) – Indonesia (Sumatra)
- Araneus virgus (Fox, 1938) – China
- Araneus viridisomus Gravely, 1921 – India
- Araneus volgeri Simon, 1897 – Tanzania (Zanzibar)
- Araneus vulvarius (Thorell, 1898) – Myanmar
- Araneus wanghuai Mi, Wang & Gan, 2023 – China
- Araneus washingtoni Levi, 1971 – Russia (Far East), Canada, United States
- Araneus wokamus (Strand, 1911) – Indonesia (Aru Is.)
- Araneus woodfordi Pocock, 1898 – Solomon Is.
- Araneus workmani (Keyserling, 1884) – Brazil, Argentina
- Araneus wulongensis Song & Zhu, 1992 – China
- Araneus xavantina Levi, 1991 – Brazil
- Araneus xianfengensis Song & Zhu, 1992 – China
- Araneus xiang Mi & Li, 2023 – China
- Araneus xizangensis Hu, 2001 – China
- Araneus yadongensis Hu, 2001 – China
- Araneus yangchuandongi Mi, Wang & Gan, 2023 – China
- Araneus yapingensis Yin, Griswold, Yan & Liu, 2009 – China
- Araneus yasudai Tanikawa, 2001 – Russia (Far East), Korea, Japan
- Araneus yatei Berland, 1924 – New Caledonia
- Araneus yoshitomii Yoshida, 2014 – Japan, (Ogasawara Is.)
- Araneus yuanminensis Yin, Wang, Xie & Peng, 1990 – China
- Araneus yuboi Mi, Wang & Gan, 2023 – China
- Araneus yukon Levi, 1971 – Russia (Central to East Siberia), Canada
- Araneus yunnanensis Yin, Peng & Wang, 1994 – China
- Araneus yuzhongensis Yin, Wang, Xie & Peng, 1990 – China
- Araneus zapallar Levi, 1991 – Chile
- Araneus zebrinus Zhu & Wang, 1994 – China
- Araneus zhangmu Zhang, Song & Kim, 2006 – China
- Araneus zhaoi F. Zhang & C. Zhang, 2002 – China
- Araneus zhoui Mi & Wang, 2023 – China (Hainan)
- Araneus zygielloides Schenkel, 1963 – China

== Araniella ==
Araniella Chamberlin & Ivie, 1942

- Araniella alpica (L. Koch, 1869) — Europe to Azerbaijan
- Araniella coreana Namkung, 2002 — Korea
- Araniella cucurbitina (Clerck, 1757) — Palearctic
- Araniella displicata (Hentz, 1847) (type species) — Holarctic
- Araniella inconspicua (Simon, 1874) — Palearctic
- Araniella jilinensis Yin & Zhu, 1994 — China
- Araniella maderiana (Kulczynski, 1905) — Canary Islands, Madeira
- Araniella opisthographa (Kulczynski, 1905) — Europe to Central Asia
- Araniella plicata Mi & Peng, 2016 - China
- Araniella proxima (Kulczynski, 1885) — Holarctic
- Araniella tbilisiensis (Mcheidze, 1997) — Georgia
- Araniella yaginumai Tanikawa, 1995 — Russia, Korea, China, Taiwan, Japan

== Aranoethra ==
Aranoethra Butler, 1873

- Aranoethra butleri Pocock, 1899 — West Africa
- Aranoethra cambridgei (Butler, 1873) (type species) — West, Central Africa
- Aranoethra ungari Karsch, 1878 — West Africa

== Argiope ==
Argiope Audouin, 1826

- Argiope abramovi Logunov & Jäger, 2015 - Vietnam
- Argiope aemula (Walckenaer, 1841) — India to Philippines, Sulawesi, New Hebrides
- Argiope aetherea (Walckenaer, 1841) — China to Australia
- Argiope aetheroides Yin et al., 1989 — China, Japan
- Argiope ahngeri Spassky, 1932 — Central Asia
- Argiope amoena L. Koch, 1878 — China, Korea, Taiwan, Japan
- Argiope anasuja Thorell, 1887 — Seychelles to India, Pakistan, Maldives
- Argiope anomalopalpis Bjørn, 1997 — Congo, South Africa
- Argiope appensa (Walckenaer, 1841) — Hawaii, Taiwan to New Guinea
- Argiope argentata (Fabricius, 1775) — USA to Chile
- Argiope aurantia Lucas, 1833 — Canada to Costa Rica
- Argiope aurocincta Pocock, 1898 — Central, East, Southern Africa
- Argiope australis (Walckenaer, 1805) — Central, East, Southern Africa, Cape Verde Islands
- Argiope bivittigera Strand, 1911 — Indonesia
- Argiope blanda O. P.-Cambridge, 1898 — USA to Costa Rica
- Argiope boesenbergi Levi, 1983 — China, Korea, Japan
- Argiope bougainvilla (Walckenaer, 1847) — New Guinea to Solomon Islands
- Argiope bruennichi (Scopoli, 1772) — Palearctic
- Argiope brunnescentia Strand, 1911 — New Guinea, Bismarck Archipel
- Argiope buehleri Schenkel, 1944 — Timor
- Argiope bullocki Rainbow, 1908 — New South Wales
- Argiope butchko LeQuier & Agnarsson, 2016 - Cuba
- Argiope caesarea Thorell, 1897 — India, Myanmar, China
- Argiope caledonia Levi, 1983 — New Caledonia, New Hebrides
- Argiope cameloides Zhu & Song, 1994 — China
- Argiope catenulata (Doleschall, 1859) — India to Philippines, New Guinea
- Argiope chloreis Thorell, 1877 — Laos, Sumatra to New Guinea
- Argiope comorica Bjørn, 1997 — Comoro Islands
- Argiope coquereli (Vinson, 1863) — Zanzibar, Madagascar
- Argiope dang Jäger & Praxaysombath, 2009 — Thailand, Laos
- Argiope dietrichae Levi, 1983 — Western Australia, Northern Australia
- Argiope doboensis Strand, 1911 — Indonesia, New Guinea
- Argiope doleschalli Thorell, 1873 — Indonesia
- Argiope ericae Levi, 2004 — Brazil, Argentina
- Argiope flavipalpis (Lucas, 1858) — Africa, Yemen
- Argiope florida Chamberlin & Ivie, 1944 — USA
- Argiope halmaherensis Strand, 1907 — Moluccas to New Guinea
- Argiope hinderlichi Jäger, 2012 — Laos
- Argiope intricata Simon, 1877 — Philippines
- Argiope jinghongensis Yin, Peng & Wang, 1994 — China, Laos, Thailand
- Argiope kaingang Corronca & Rodríguez-Artigas, 2015 - Argentina
- Argiope katherina Levi, 1983 — Northern Australia
- Argiope keyserlingi Karsch, 1878 — Queensland, New South Wales, Lord Howe Islands
- Argiope kochi Levi, 1983 — Queensland
- Argiope legionis Motta & Levi, 2009 — Brazil
- Argiope levii Bjørn, 1997 — Kenya, Tanzania
- Argiope lobata (Pallas, 1772) type species — Old World
- Argiope luzona (Walckenaer, 1841) — Philippines
- Argiope macrochoera Thorell, 1891 — Nicobar Islands, China
- Argiope madang Levi, 1984 — New Guinea
- Argiope magnifica L. Koch, 1871 — Queensland to Solomon Islands
- Argiope mangal Koh, 1991 — Singapore
- Argiope manila Levi, 1983 — Philippines
- Argiope mascordi Levi, 1983 — Queensland
- Argiope minuta Karsch, 1879 — Bangladesh, East Asia
- Argiope modesta Thorell, 1881 — Borneo to Australia
- Argiope niasensis Strand, 1907 — Indonesia
- Argiope ocula Fox, 1938 — China, Taiwan, Japan
- Argiope ocyaloides L. Koch, 1871 — Queensland
- Argiope pentagona L. Koch, 1871 — Fiji
- Argiope perforata Schenkel, 1963 — China
- Argiope picta L. Koch, 1871 — Moluccas to Australia
- Argiope pictula Strand, 1911 — Sulawesi
- Argiope ponape Levi, 1983 — Caroline Islands
- Argiope possoica Merian, 1911 — Sulawesi
- Argiope probata Rainbow, 1916 — Queensland
- Argiope protensa L. Koch, 1872 — New Guinea, Australia, New Caledonia, New Zealand
- Argiope pulchella Thorell, 1881 — India to China and Indonesia
- Argiope pulchelloides Yin et al., 1989 — China
- Argiope radon Levi, 1983 — Northern Australia
- Argiope ranomafanensis Bjørn, 1997 — Madagascar
- Argiope reinwardti (Doleschall, 1859) — Malaysia to New Guinea
  - Argiope reinwardti sumatrana (Hasselt, 1882) — Sumatra
- Argiope sapoa Barrion & Litsinger, 1995 — Philippines
- Argiope sector (Forsskal, 1776) — North Africa, Middle East, Cape Verde Islands
- Argiope squallica Strand, 1915 — New Guinea
- Argiope submaronica Strand, 1916 — Mexico to Bolivia, Brazil
- Argiope takum Chrysanthus, 1971 — New Guinea
- Argiope tapinolobata Bjørn, 1997 — Senegal, Namibia
- Argiope taprobanica Thorell, 1887 — Sri Lanka
- Argiope trifasciata (Forsskal, 1775) — Cosmopolitan
  - Argiope trifasciata deserticola Simon, 1906 — Sudan
  - Argiope trifasciata kauaiensis Simon, 1900 — Hawaii
- Argiope truk Levi, 1983 — Caroline Islands
- Argiope versicolor (Doleschall, 1859) — China to Java
- Argiope vietnamensis Ono, 2010 — Vietnam

== Arkys ==
Arkys Walckenaer, 1837

- Arkys alatus Keyserling, 1890 — Queensland, New South Wales
- Arkys alticephala (Urquhart, 1891) — Southern Australia
- Arkys brevipalpus Karsch, 1878 — New Caledonia
- Arkys bulburinensis Heimer, 1984 — Queensland, New South Wales
- Arkys cicatricosus (Rainbow, 1920) — Lord Howe Islands
- Arkys cornutus L. Koch, 1872 — New Guinea, Queensland
- Arkys coronatus (Balogh, 1978) — New Guinea
- Arkys curtulus (Simon, 1903) — Eastern Australia
- Arkys dilatatus (Balogh, 1978) — Queensland
- Arkys furcatus (Balogh, 1978) — Queensland
- Arkys gracilis Heimer, 1984 — Queensland
- Arkys grandis (Balogh, 1978) — New Caledonia
- Arkys hickmani Heimer, 1984 — Tasmania
- Arkys kaszabi (Balogh, 1978) — New Guinea
- Arkys lancearius Walckenaer, 1837 (type species) — New Guinea to New South Wales
- Arkys latissimus (Balogh, 1982) — Queensland
- Arkys montanus (Balogh, 1978) — New Guinea
- Arkys multituberculatus (Balogh, 1982) — Queensland
- Arkys nimdol Chrysanthus, 1971 — New Guinea
- Arkys occidentalis (Reimoser, 1936) — Buru Islands
- Arkys roosdorpi (Chrysanthus, 1971) — New Guinea
- Arkys semicirculatus (Balogh, 1982) — Queensland
- Arkys sibil (Chrysanthus, 1971) — New Guinea
- Arkys soosi (Balogh, 1982) — New Guinea
- Arkys speechleyi (Mascord, 1968) — New South Wales
- Arkys toxopeusi (Reimoser, 1936) — Buru Islands
- Arkys transversus (Balogh, 1978) — New South Wales
- Arkys tuberculatus (Balogh, 1978) — Queensland
- Arkys varians (Balogh, 1978) — New Caledonia
- Arkys vicarius (Balogh, 1978) — New Caledonia
- Arkys walckenaeri Simon, 1879 — Australia, Tasmania

== Artonis ==
Artonis Simon, 1895

- Artonis bituberculata (Thorell, 1895) (type species) — Myanmar
- Artonis gallana (Pavesi, 1895) — Ethiopia

== Aspidolasius ==
Aspidolasius Simon, 1887

- Aspidolasius branicki (Taczanowski, 1879) — Colombia to Bolivia, Guyana, Brazil

== Augusta ==
Augusta O. P.-Cambridge, 1877

- Augusta glyphica (Guerin, 1839) — Madagascar

== Austracantha ==
Austracantha Dahl, 1914

- Austracantha minax (Thorell, 1859) — Australia, Tasmania
  - Austracantha minax astrigera (L. Koch, 1871) — Australia
  - Austracantha minax hermitis (Hogg, 1914) — Montebello Islands
  - Austracantha minax leonhardii (Strand, 1913) — Australia
  - Austracantha minax lugubris (L. Koch, 1871) — Australia
