= Aethrodiscus =

Scientific classification
- Kingdom: Animalia
- Phylum: Arthropoda
- Subphylum: Chelicerata
- Class: Arachnida
- Order: Araneae
- Infraorder: Araneomorphae
- Family: Araneidae
- Genus: Aethrodiscus
- Species: A. transversalis

Binomial name
- Aethrodiscus transversalis Strand, 1913

Genus of spiders

Aethrodiscus is a genus of African orb-weaver spiders containing the single species, Aethrodiscus transversalis. It was first described by Embrik Strand in 1913, and has only been found in Central Africa.
