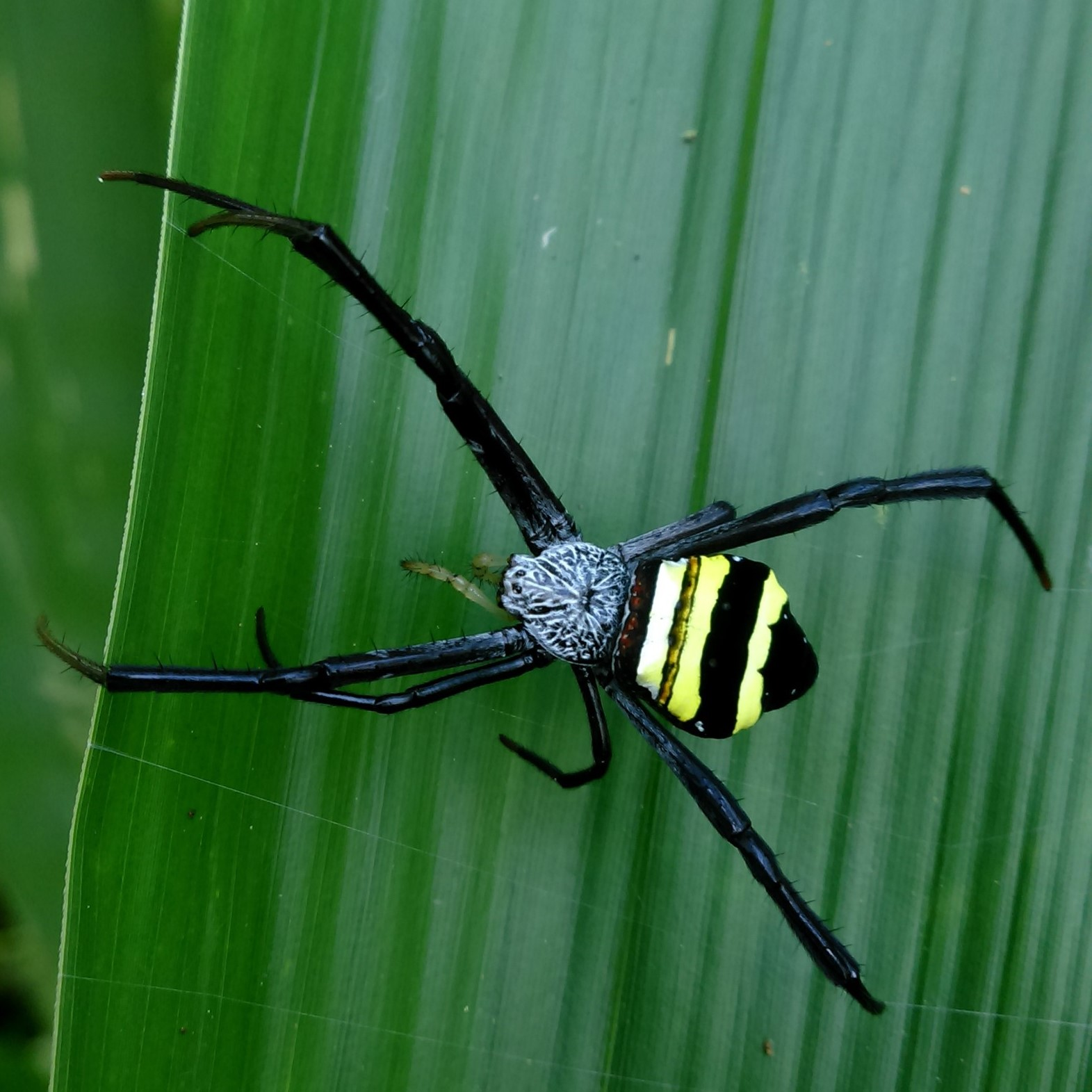

Scientific classification
- Kingdom: Animalia
- Phylum: Arthropoda
- Subphylum: Chelicerata
- Class: Arachnida
- Order: Araneae
- Infraorder: Araneomorphae
- Family: Araneidae
- Genus: Argiope
- Species: A. caesarea

Binomial name
- Argiope caesarea Thorell, 1897

= Argiope caesarea =

Species of spider

Argiope caesarea is a species of orb-weaver spider.

== Description ==
Argiope caesarea has long, black legs and a yellow and black striped abdomen consistent with many other spiders is this genus.

== Range ==
This species is native to the south of China and north of India, with any reported sightings of A. caesarea occurring in China, India, Viet Nam, Nepal, Thailand, and Myanmar.
