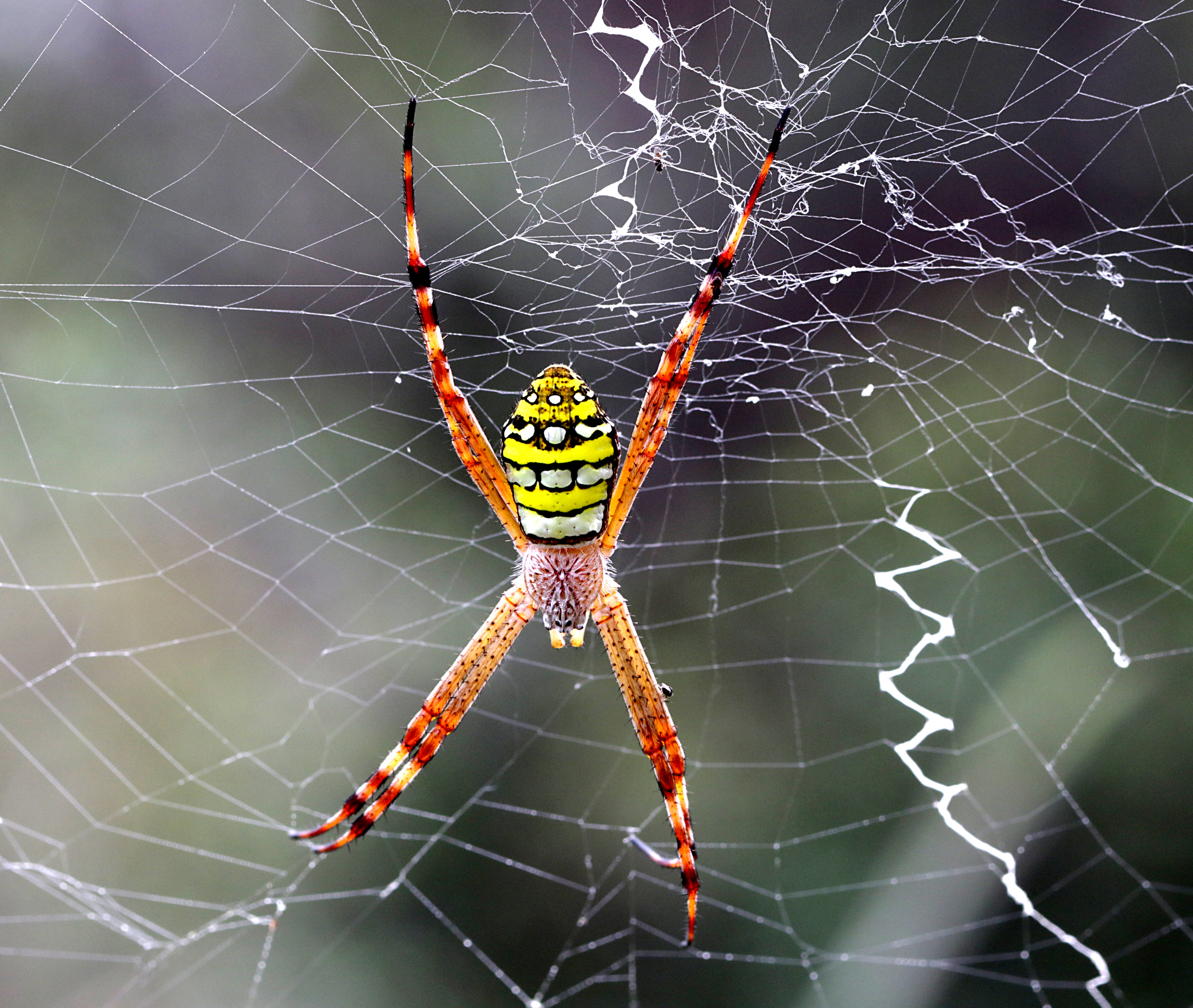
- Argiope picta female dorsal view, Cairns
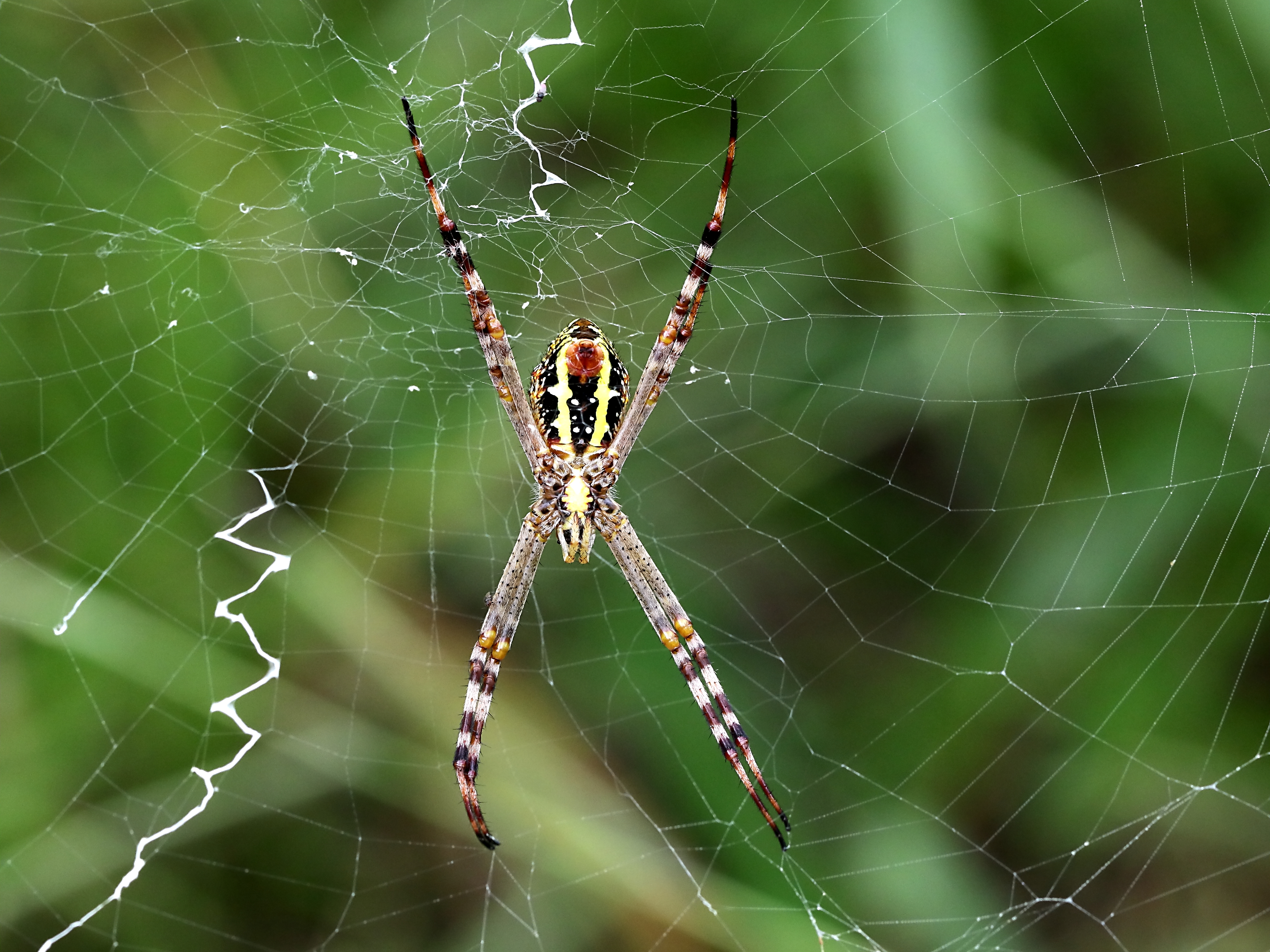
- Ventral view of the same spider

Scientific classification
- Domain: Eukaryota
- Kingdom: Animalia
- Phylum: Arthropoda
- Subphylum: Chelicerata
- Class: Arachnida
- Order: Araneae
- Infraorder: Araneomorphae
- Family: Araneidae
- Genus: Argiope
- Species: A. picta

Binomial name
- Argiope picta L. Koch, 1871

Synonyms
- A. gorgonea A. principalis A. lugubris Gea dubiosa Chaetargiope picta

= Argiope picta =

Species of spider

Argiope picta is a species of orb web spider found in tropical areas of Queensland, Australia and Papua New Guinea up to the Moluccas. This species is similar in size to the sympatric Argiope aetherea; females can be distinguished from those of A. aetherea via extensive differences in abdominal colouration and patterns. The males of these two species are almost indistinguishable.

Little is known about the biology of A. picta. However, like most orb-web spiders, males are much smaller than females. Females of this species construct web decorations. Spiders from Australia mostly construct their decorations in a vertical line above and below the centre of the web (hub), whereas those from Papua New Guinea construct the characteristic “X” shape of St Andrew's Cross spiders. It is not known why these different decoration patterns appear in the same species, but it may be related to habitat differences.

== Gallery ==
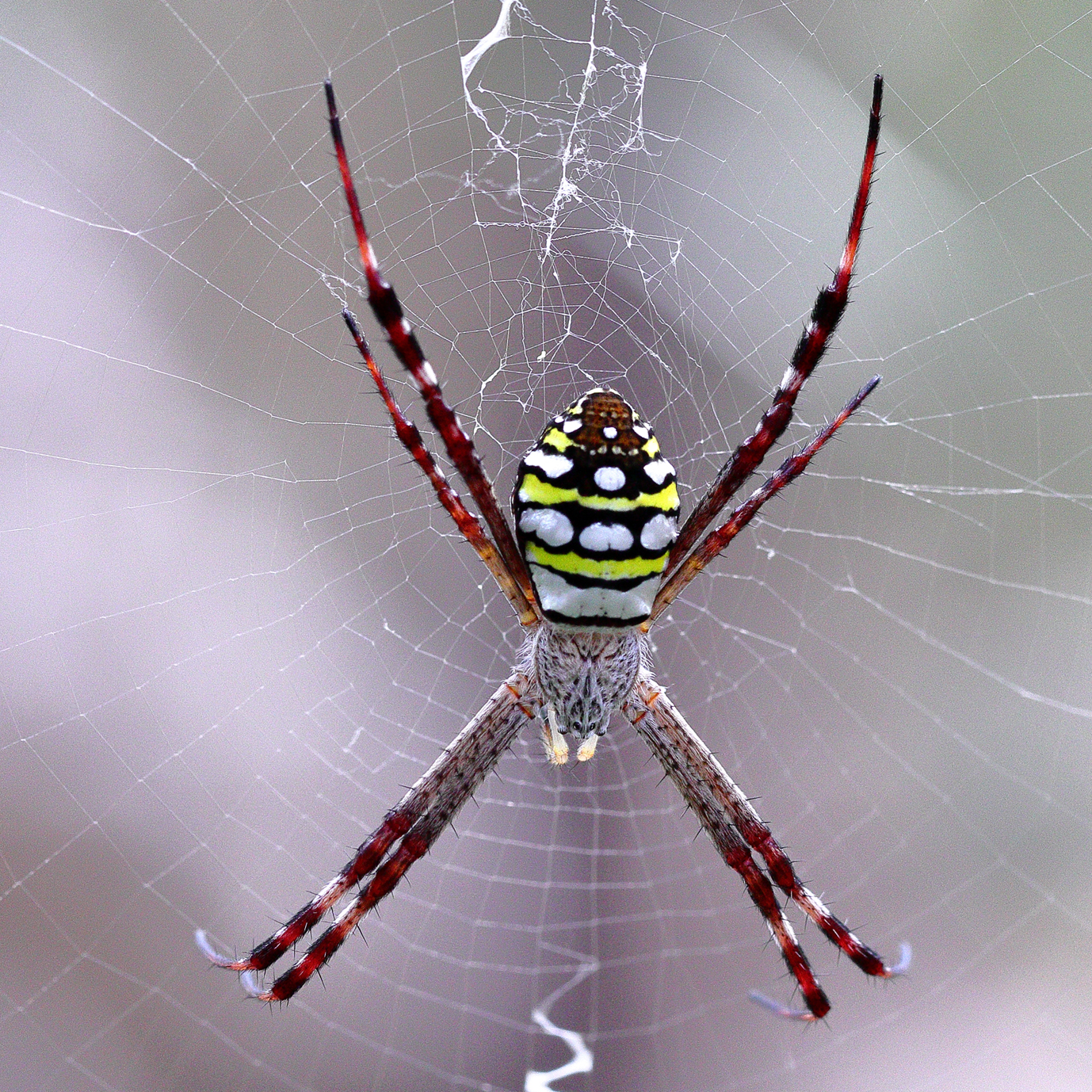
Dorsal view, Queensland

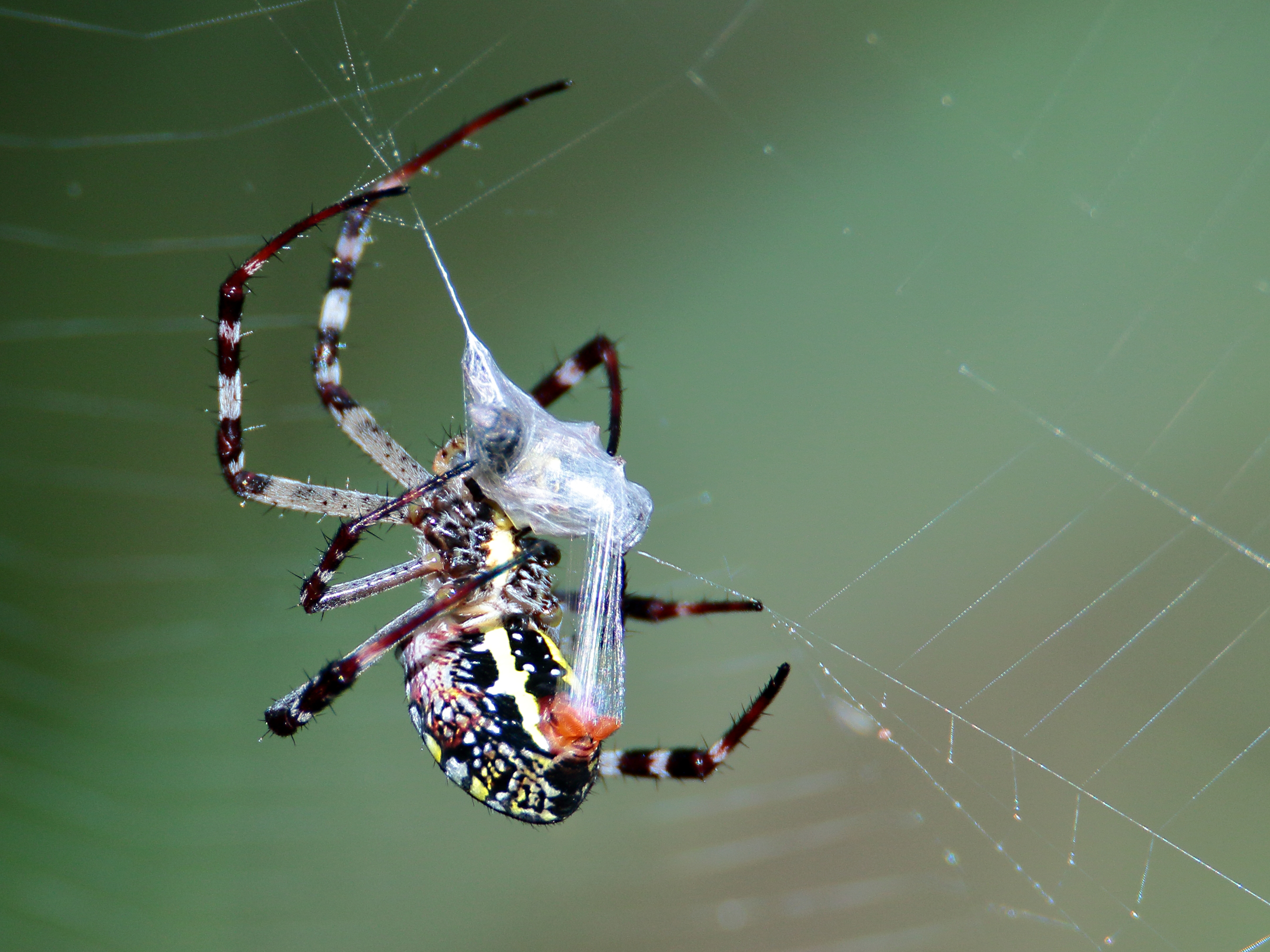
Female immobilizing prey by wrapping a curtain of silk around the insect for later consumption

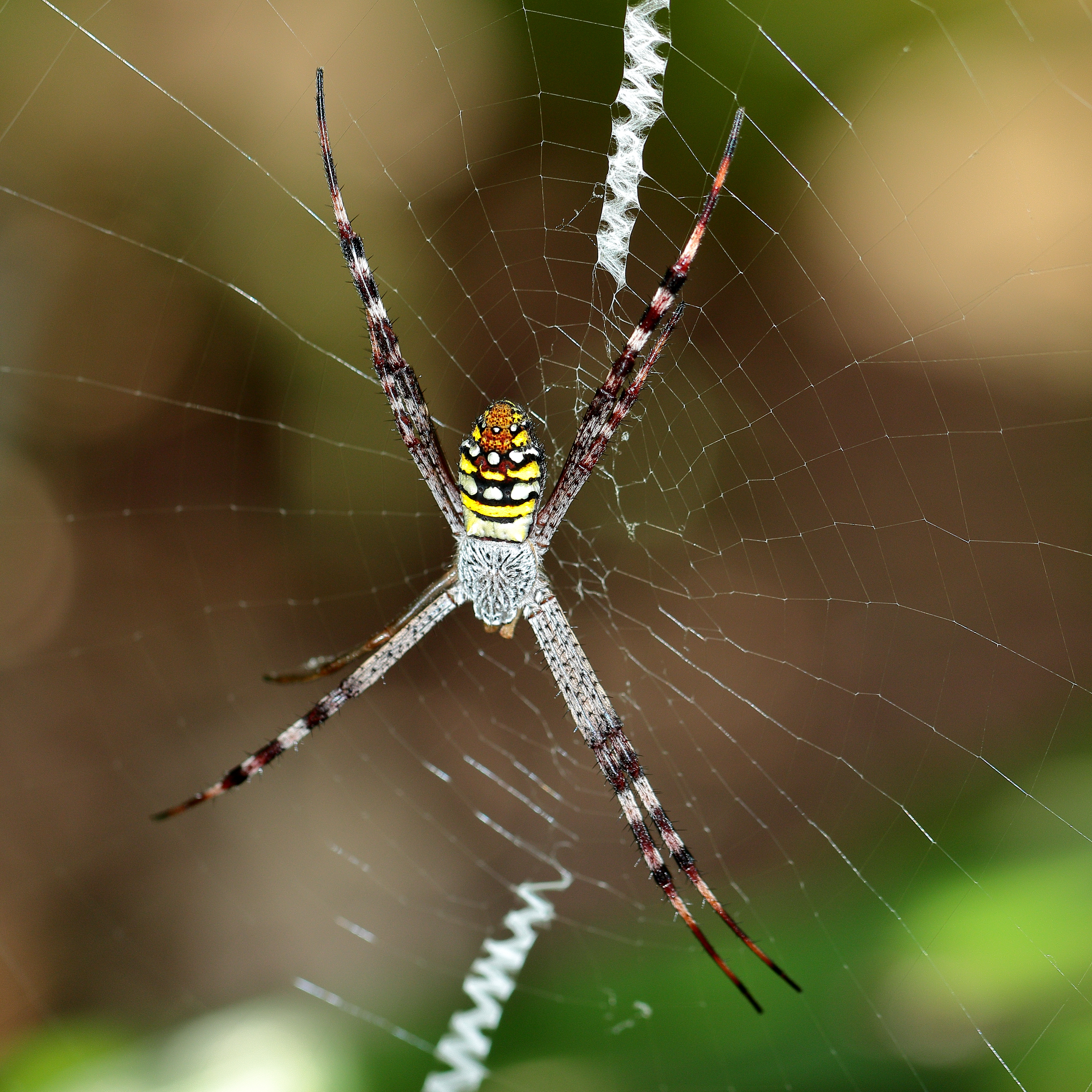
Adult female in north Queensland with two segments of its stabilimentum arranged vertically

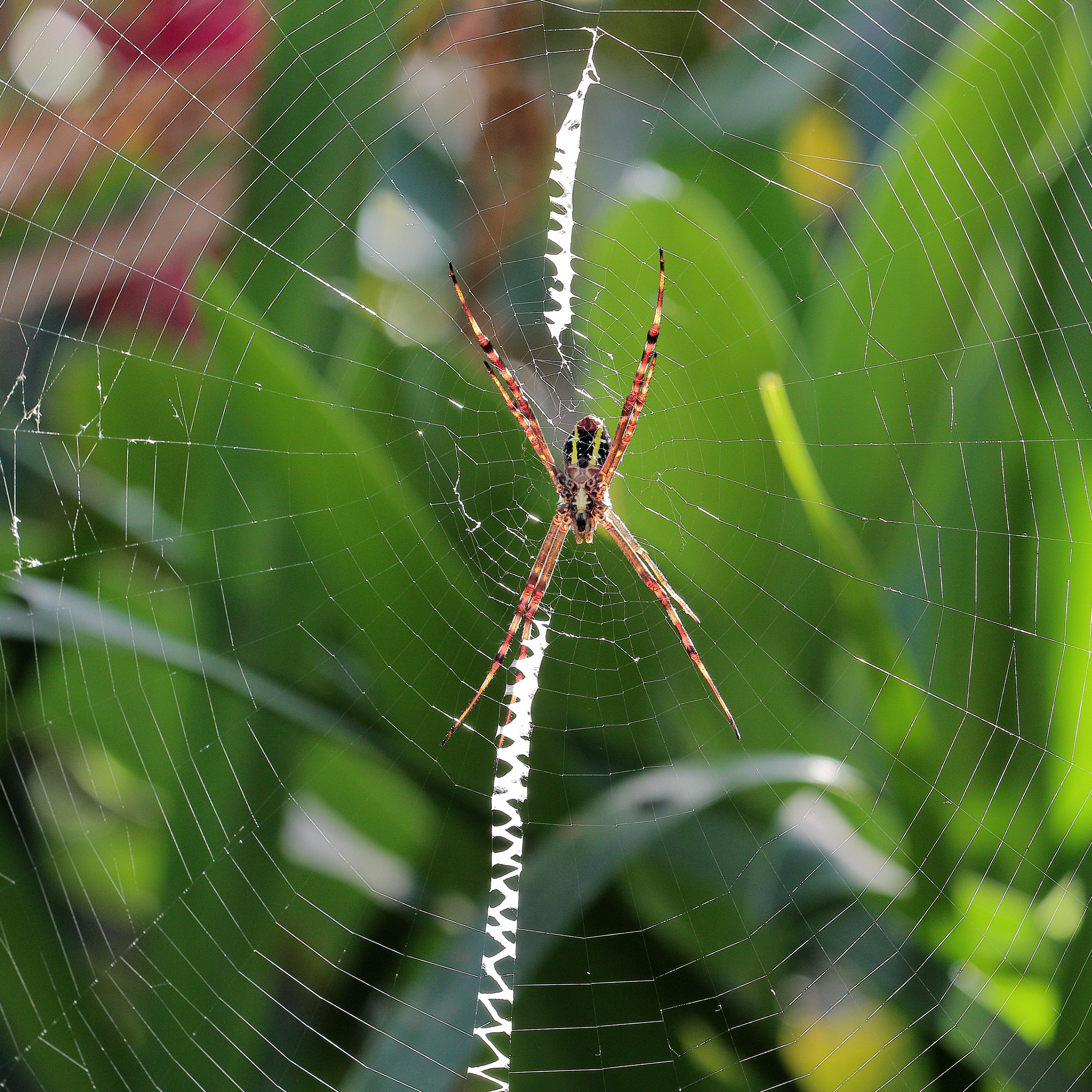
Ventral view of the same spider two days later
