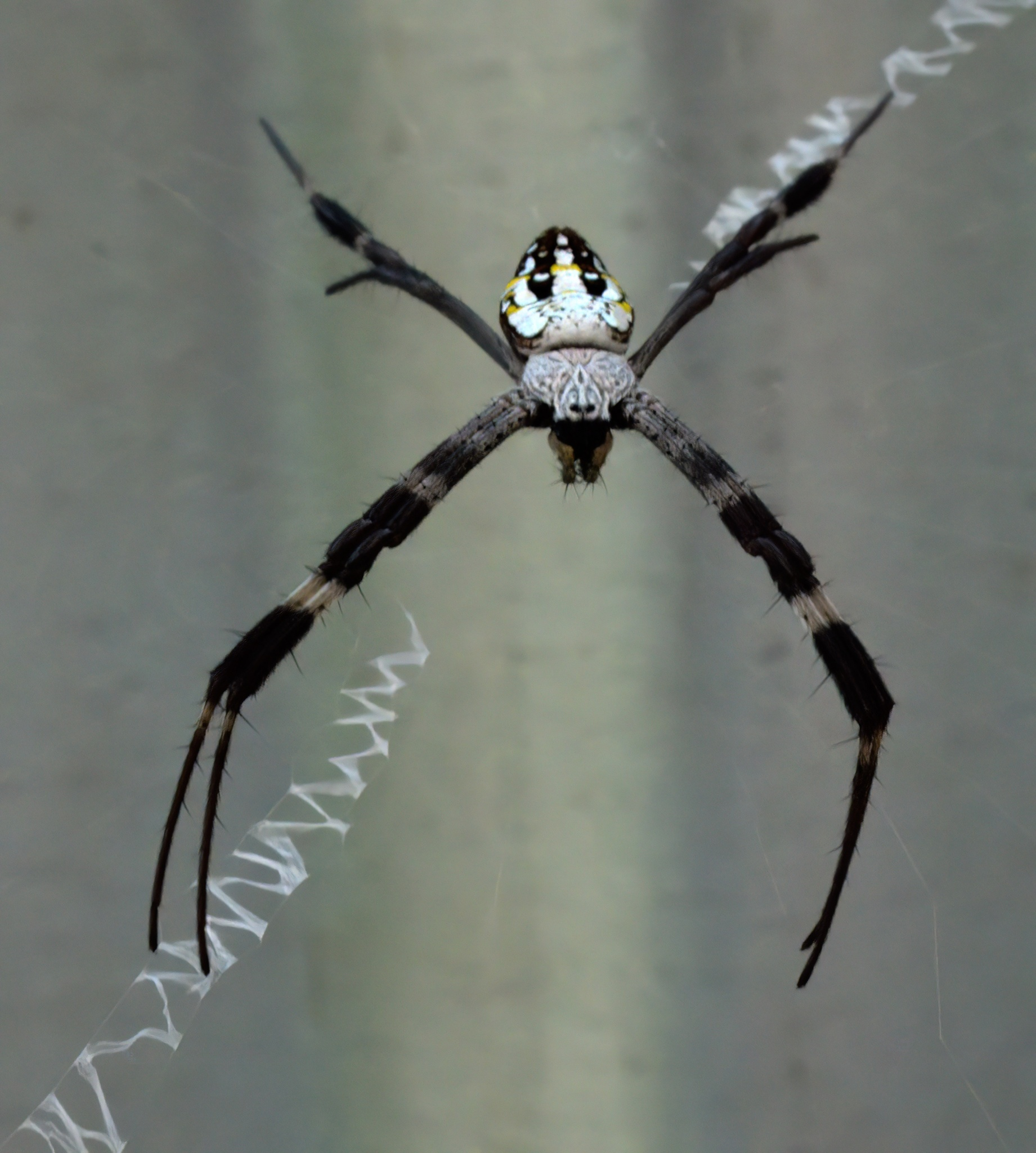
- female from Vietnam

Scientific classification
- Kingdom: Animalia
- Phylum: Arthropoda
- Subphylum: Chelicerata
- Class: Arachnida
- Order: Araneae
- Infraorder: Araneomorphae
- Family: Araneidae
- Genus: Argiope
- Species: A. dang

Binomial name
- Argiope dang Jäger & Praxaysombath, 2009

= Argiope dang =

Species of spider

Argiope dang is a species of orb weaver spider in the family Araneidae. It was first described in 2009 and is found in Thailand and Laos.

== Etymology ==
The specific epithet is derived from the Lao word "dàng", meaning "loud" and referring to the noise at the riverbanks in Vang Vieng, where the type material was collected while loud techno music was playing in the otherwise beautiful landscape.

== Distribution ==
A. dang has been recorded from Thailand and Laos. There have been observations from Indonesia, Malaysia including Borneo, Cambodia and Vietnam.

== Description ==
Argiope dang shows sexual dimorphism typical of orb weavers. Males are smaller than females, with the male measuring 1.9-2.0 mm in body length while females reach 4.7-5.0 mm.

The male has a distinctive copulatory organ with an embolus that is more strongly undulate than related species, with the embolus tip bent at almost 180°. The median apophysis has a slightly longer and thinner spur with two small distal points.

Females are characterized by having a long epigyne (external genital structure) that extends at a right angle, and a distinctive coloration pattern on the opisthosoma (abdomen). The dorsal shield of the prosoma (front body section) is yellow-brown with black markings, while the opisthosoma displays bright silvery coloration with six distinct markings and a darker posterior half.
