= Aetrocantha =

Scientific classification
- Kingdom: Animalia
- Phylum: Arthropoda
- Subphylum: Chelicerata
- Class: Arachnida
- Order: Araneae
- Infraorder: Araneomorphae
- Family: Araneidae
- Genus: Aetrocantha
- Species: A. falkensteini

Binomial name
- Aetrocantha falkensteini Karsch, 1879

Genus of spiders

Aetrocantha is a genus of African orb-weaver spiders containing the single species, Aetrocantha falkensteini. It was first described by Ferdinand Karsch in 1879, and has only been found in West and Central Africa.

The species is named after physician Dr. Falkenstein, who collected specimens in Africa.
