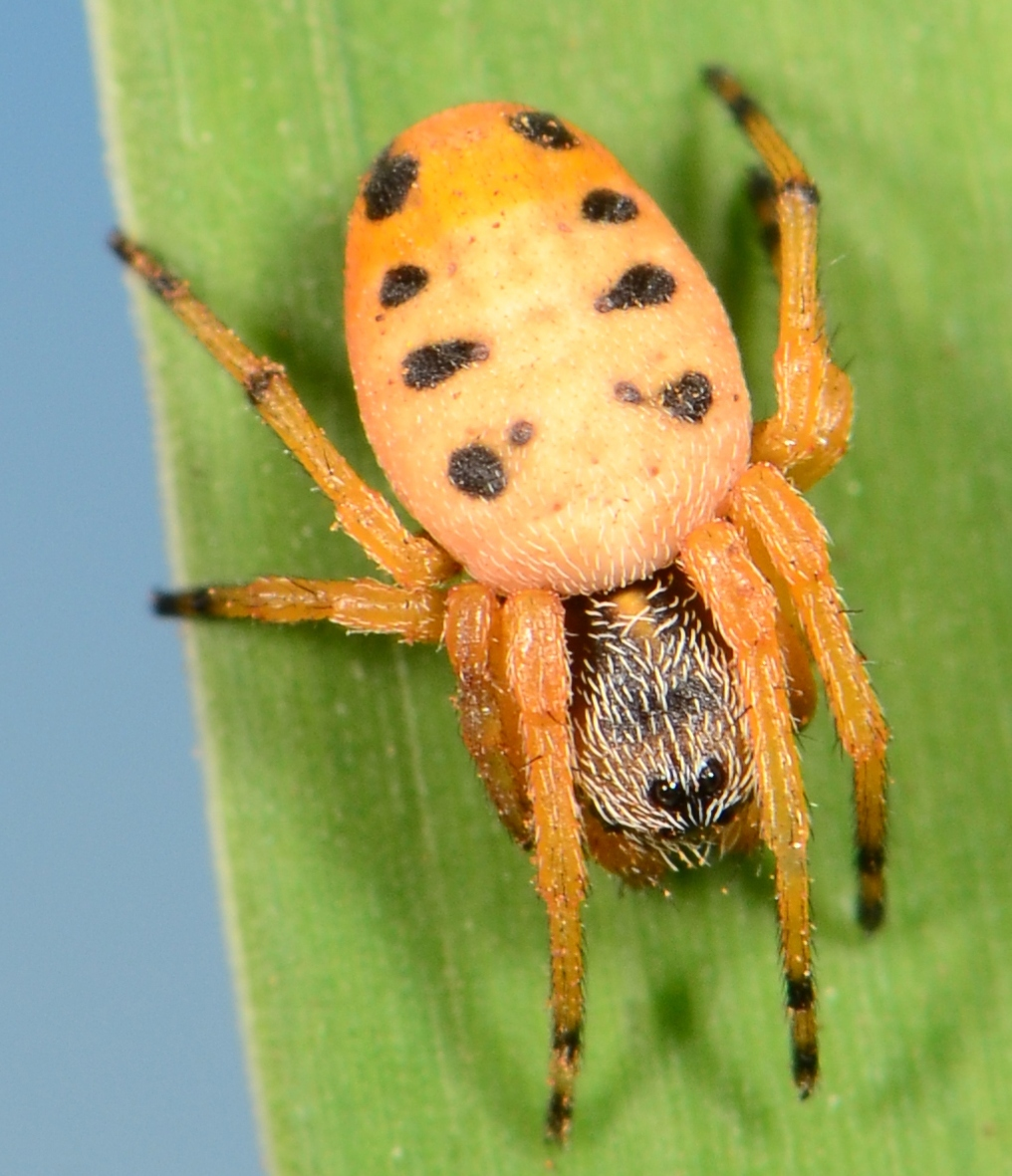
- female
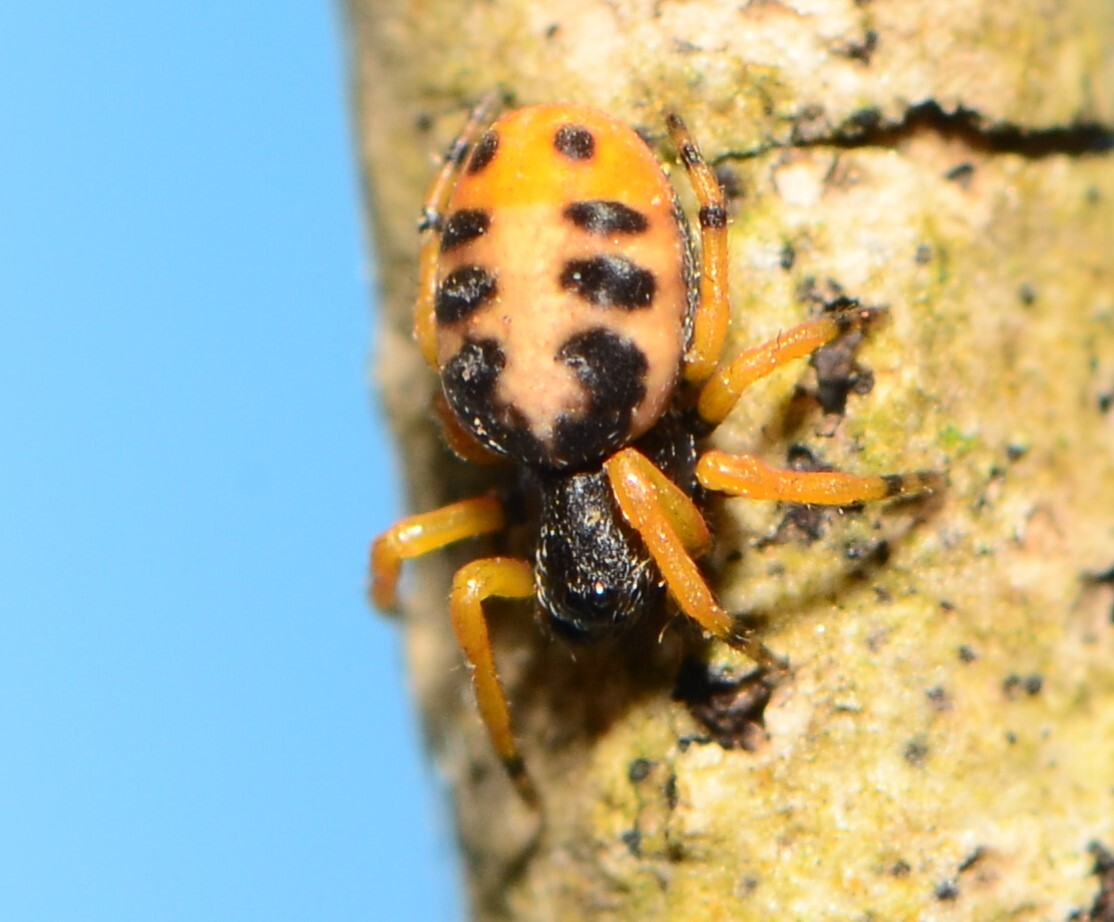
- female

Scientific classification
- Kingdom: Animalia
- Phylum: Arthropoda
- Subphylum: Chelicerata
- Class: Arachnida
- Order: Araneae
- Infraorder: Araneomorphae
- Family: Araneidae
- Genus: Araneus
- Species: A. coccinella

Binomial name
- Araneus coccinella Pocock, 1898

= Araneus coccinella =

Coccinella spider

Species of spider

Araneus coccinella is a species of spider in the family Araneidae. It is endemic to South Africa and is commonly known as the coccinella spider.

== Distribution ==
Araneus coccinella is known from three provinces in South Africa, Gauteng, Limpopo, and KwaZulu-Natal. The species was originally described from Estcourt in KwaZulu-Natal.

== Habitat and ecology ==
This orb-web dwelling spider has been sampled mainly from three biomes. The species mimics Coccinella beetles (ladybirds) in appearance. During long-term surveys in Irene, specimens were collected yearly in December and January.

== Description ==
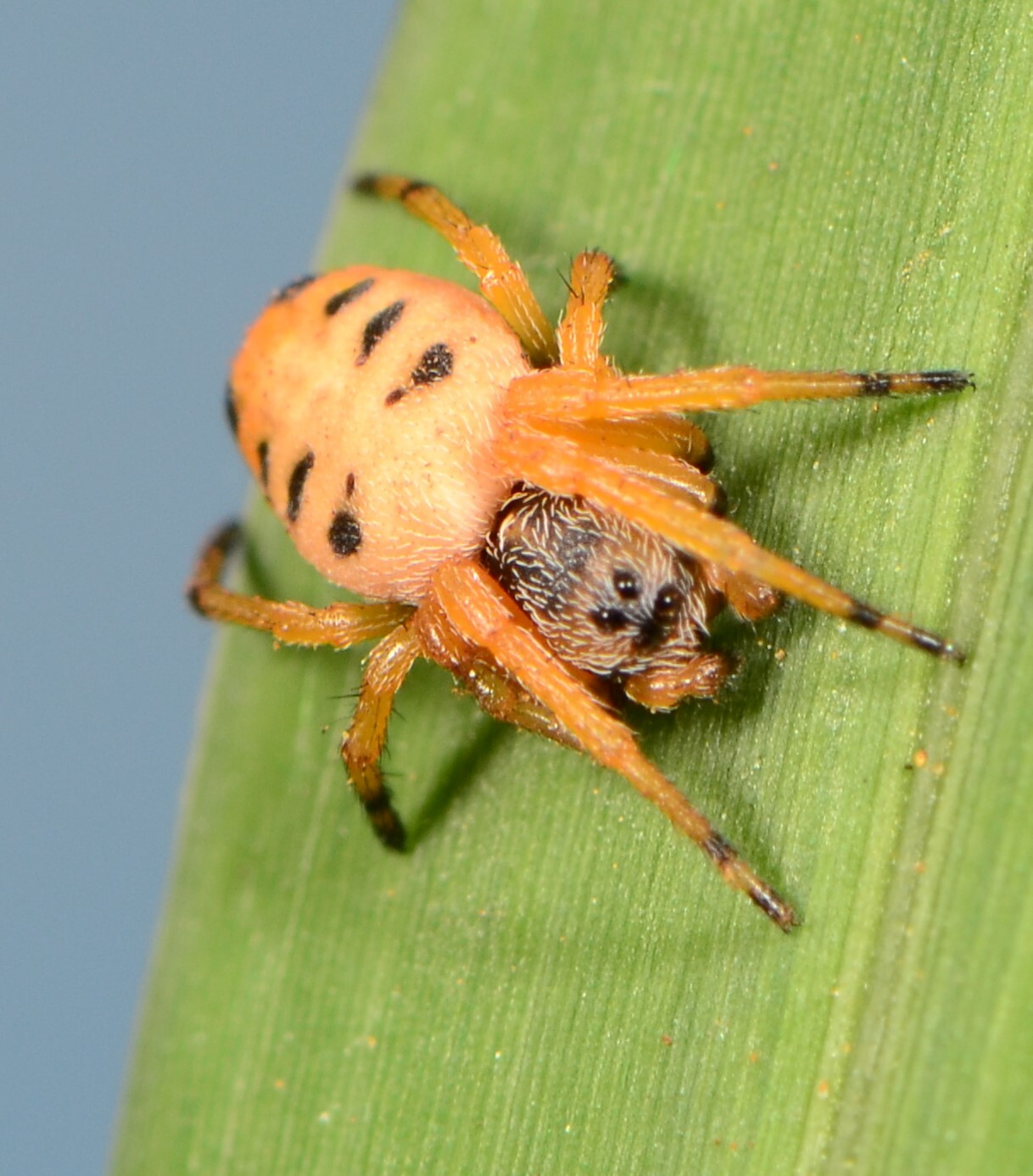

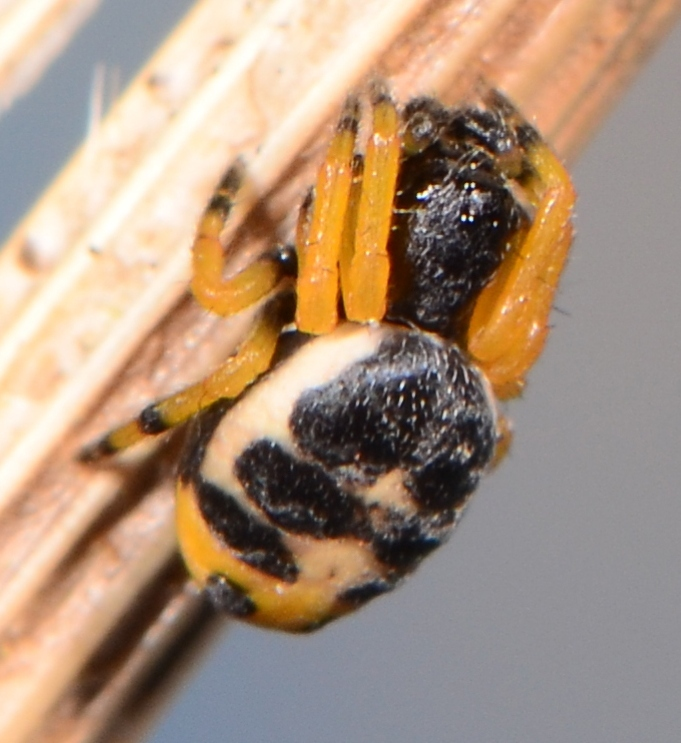

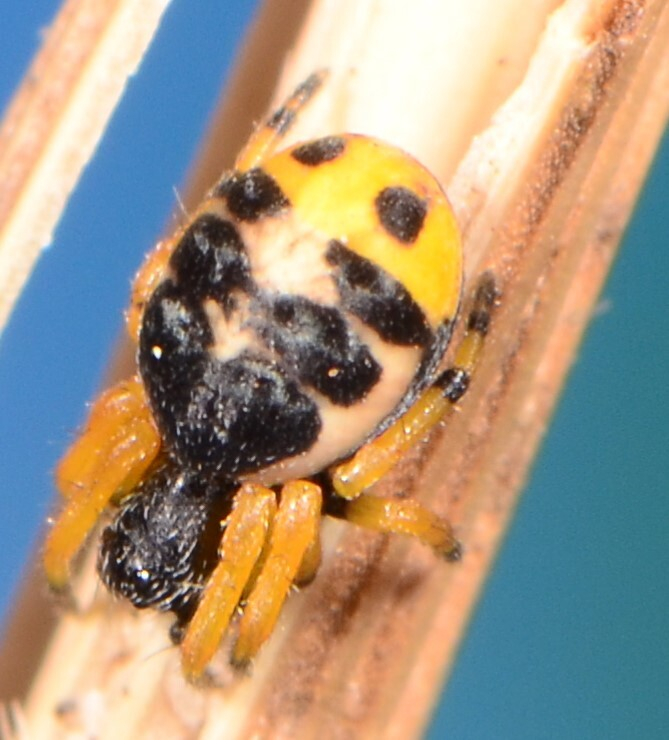

The species is easily recognized by its distinct abdominal pattern. Only the female is known, with the male remaining undescribed.

== Conservation ==
Araneus coccinella is listed as Least Concern by the South African National Biodiversity Institute despite being rare, due to its wide geographical range. The species is protected in Lhuvhondo Nature Reserve.

== Etymology ==
The species name coccinella refers to its resemblance to Coccinella beetles (ladybirds).

== Taxonomy ==
The species was described by Reginald Innes Pocock in 1898 from the type locality Estcourt in KwaZulu-Natal. Pocock speculated that this species might not belong to the genus Araneus. The species was previously misidentified in books.
