= Argiope taprobanica =

Scientific classification
- Kingdom: Animalia
- Phylum: Arthropoda
- Subphylum: Chelicerata
- Class: Arachnida
- Order: Araneae
- Infraorder: Araneomorphae
- Family: Araneidae
- Genus: Argiope
- Species: A. taprobanica

Binomial name
- Argiope taprobanica Thorell, 1887

Species of spider

Argiope taprobanica is a species of spider of the genus Argiope. It is endemic to Sri Lanka.
