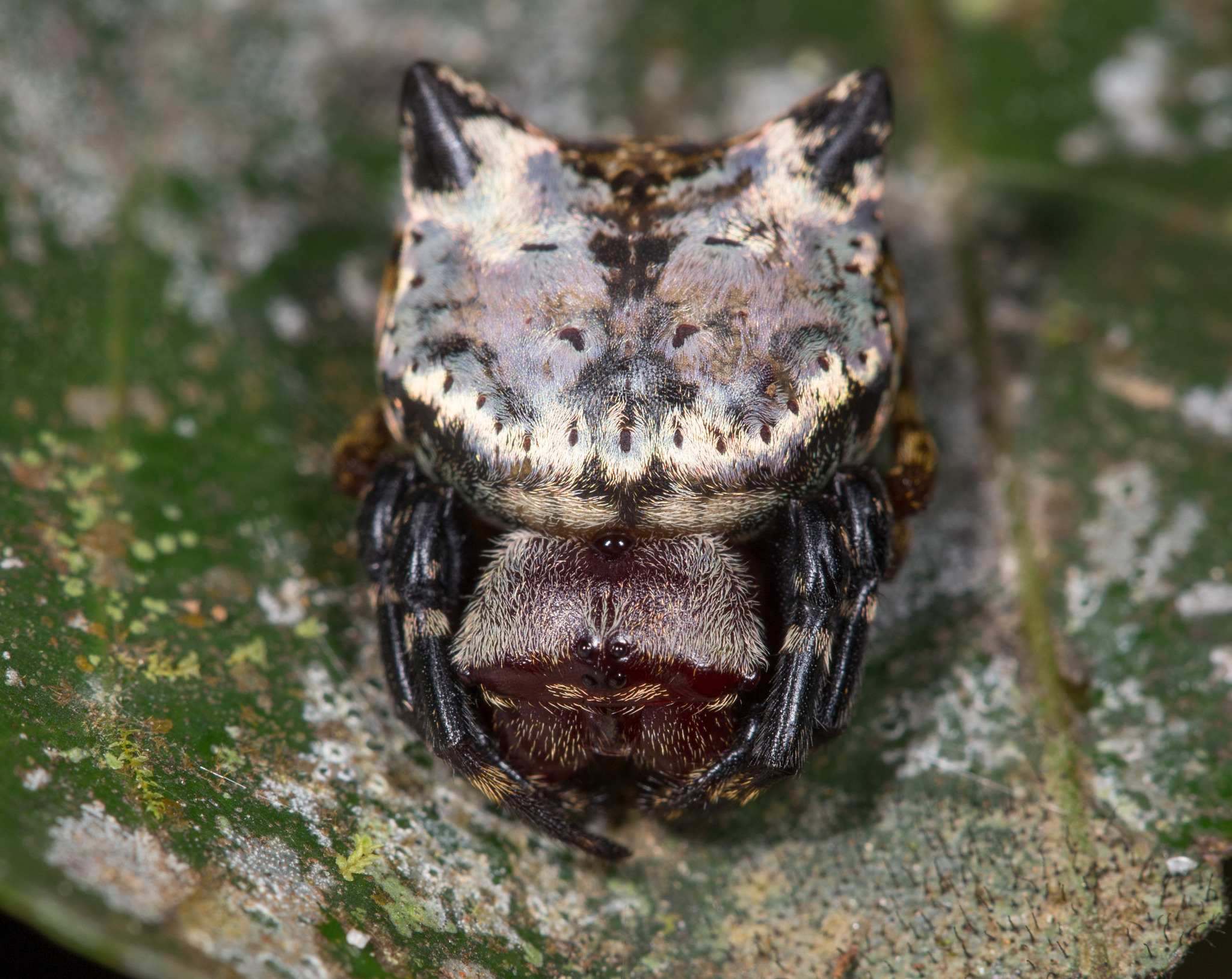

Scientific classification
- Kingdom: Animalia
- Phylum: Arthropoda
- Subphylum: Chelicerata
- Class: Arachnida
- Order: Araneae
- Infraorder: Araneomorphae
- Family: Araneidae
- Genus: Aspidolasius
- Species: A. branicki

Binomial name
- Aspidolasius branicki Simon, 1887

= Aspidolasius =

Genus of spiders

Aspidolasius is a genus of South American orb-weaver spiders containing the single species, Aspidolasius branicki. It was first described by Eugène Simon in 1887, and has been found in Colombia, Bolivia, Guyana, and Brazil.
