= Araneus arizonensis =

Scientific classification
- Domain: Eukaryota
- Kingdom: Animalia
- Phylum: Arthropoda
- Subphylum: Chelicerata
- Class: Arachnida
- Order: Araneae
- Infraorder: Araneomorphae
- Family: Araneidae
- Genus: Araneus
- Species: A. arizonensis

Binomial name
- Araneus arizonensis (Banks, 1900)

Synonyms
- Epeira arizonensis Banks, 1900; Neosconella arizonensis (Banks, 1900)

Species of spider

Araneus arizonensis is a species of spider in the family Araneidae, found in United States and Mexico.

== Taxonomy ==
The species was first described by Nathan Banks in 1900, as Epeira arizonensis. It was transferred to the genus Araneus by Alexander Petrunkevitch in 1911.
