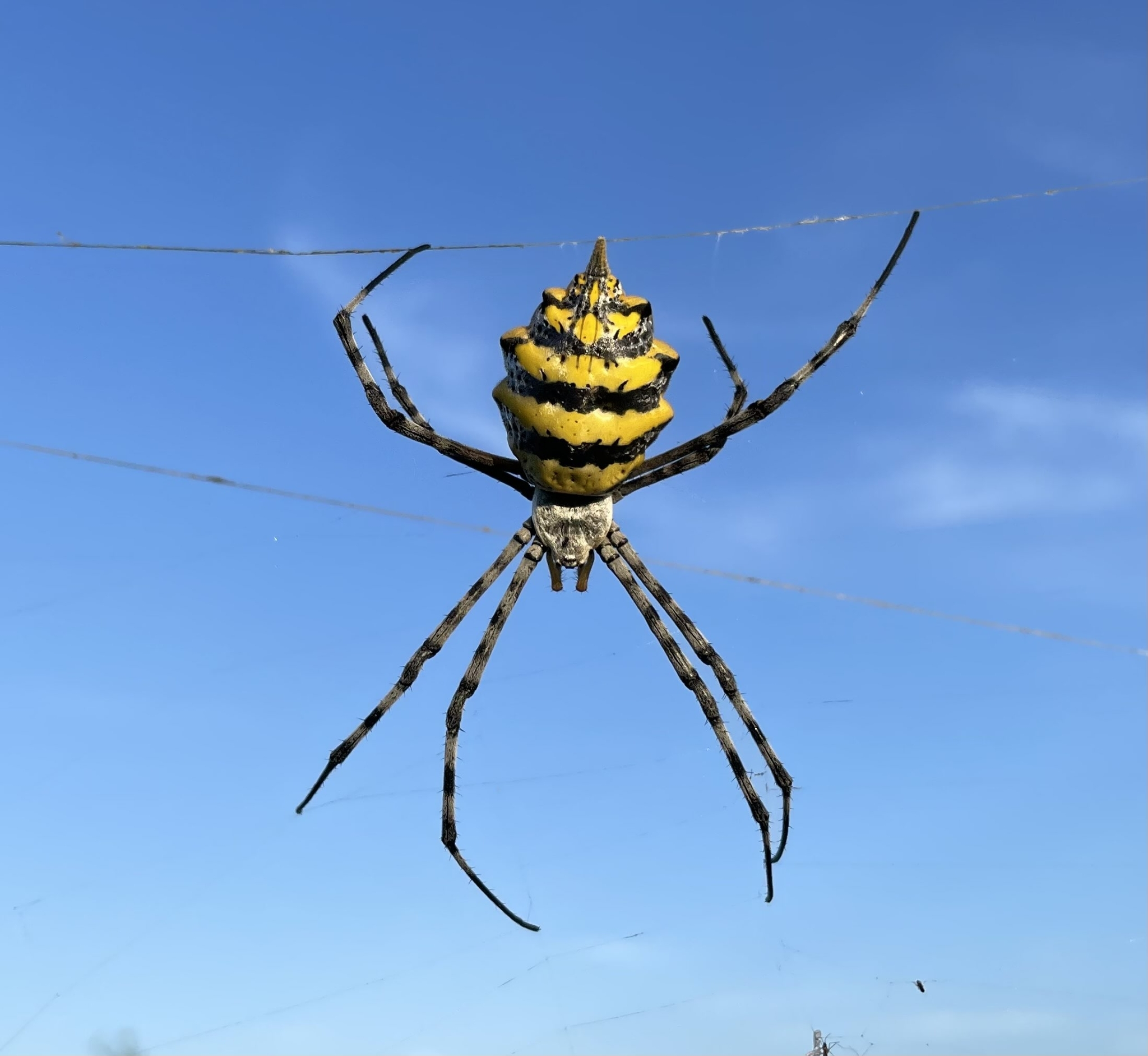
- Female
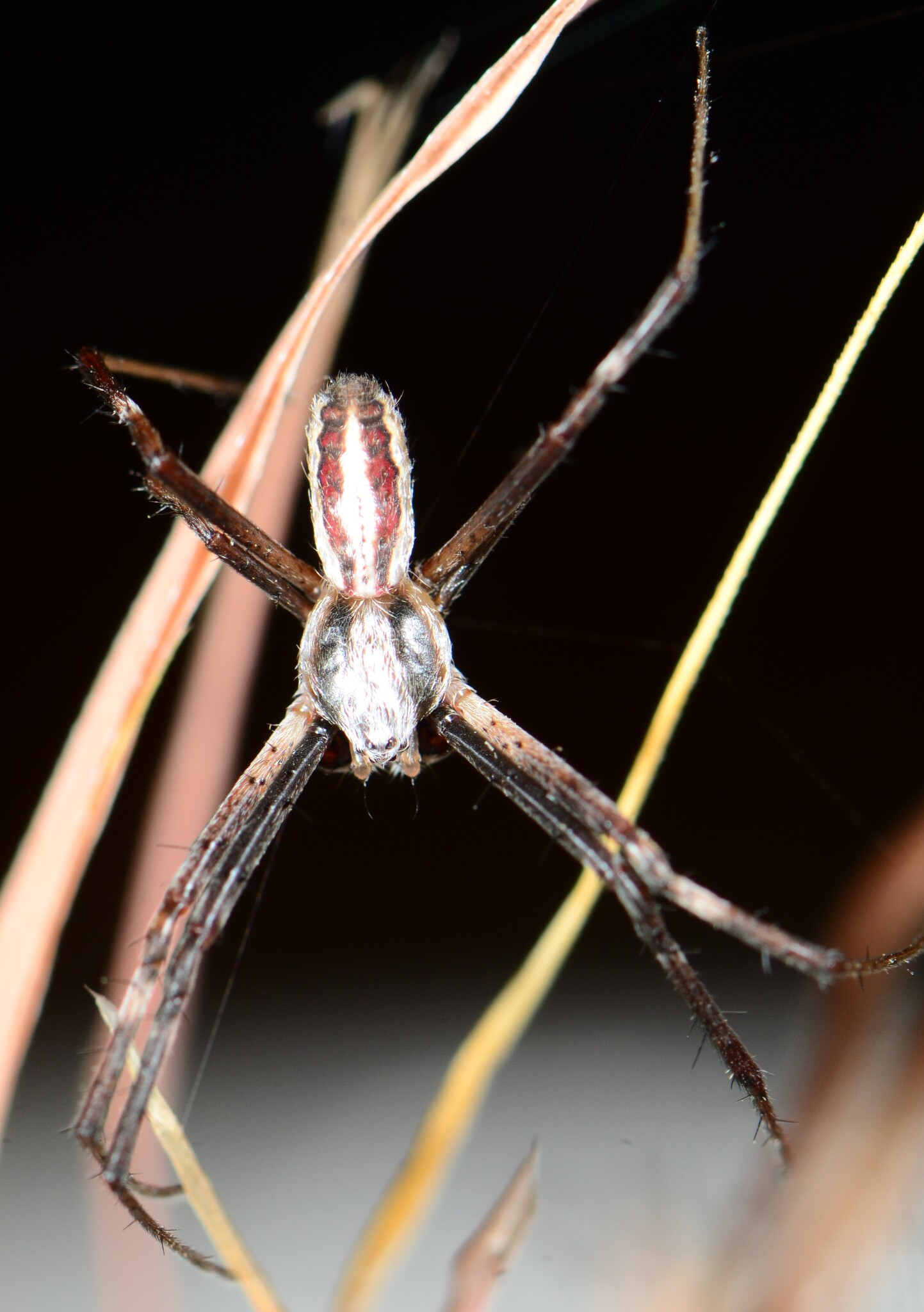
- Male

Conservation status
- Least Concern (SANBI Red List)

Scientific classification
- Kingdom: Animalia
- Phylum: Arthropoda
- Subphylum: Chelicerata
- Class: Arachnida
- Order: Araneae
- Infraorder: Araneomorphae
- Family: Araneidae
- Genus: Argiope
- Species: A. australis

Binomial name
- Argiope australis (Walckenaer, 1805)

Synonyms
- Epeira australis Walckenaer, 1805; Argyopes clathratus C. L. Koch, 1838; Argiope laeta Thorell, 1859; Argiope nigrovittata Thorell, 1859; Argyopes caudatus Blackwall, 1865; Argiope sericea zairensis Brito Capello, 1866; Argiope suavissima Gerstäcker, 1873; Argiope nigripes Simon, 1890; Argiope banana Strand, 1920

= Argiope australis =

Common Garden Orb-Web Spider

Species of spider

Argiope australis, the common garden orb web spider, is an orb-web spider (family Araneidae) found in eastern sub-Saharan Africa.

== Distribution ==
Argiope australis is found throughout eastern sub-Saharan Africa, with records from Cape Verde, Senegal, Central, Eastern and Southern Africa.

It is found as far west as the eastern Democratic Republic of the Congo, Angola, Namibia and in some areas of South Asia in Sindh, Pakistan.

== Distribution ==
Argiope australis is widespread throughout Africa. In South Africa, the species is known from all nine provinces at elevations ranging from 7 to 2,066 m above sea level.

== Habitat and ecology ==
The species constructs orb webs in open grassland areas and gardens. The webs are usually placed low in shrubby vegetation sturdy enough to bear their weight. The spider hangs at the hub head-down throughout the day, with webs frequently decorated with a stabilimentum. The species has been sampled from all floral biomes and was also collected from crops such as avocado, peach and pistachio orchards, pine plantations and pumpkin fields.

After rain in the Free State at Clocolan, an "Argiope city" was discovered where 50-60 spider webs were present in bushes, likely attracted by high numbers of grasshoppers. Most webs were large, at least 500 mm in diameter, some with stabilimenta and others without.

== Description ==
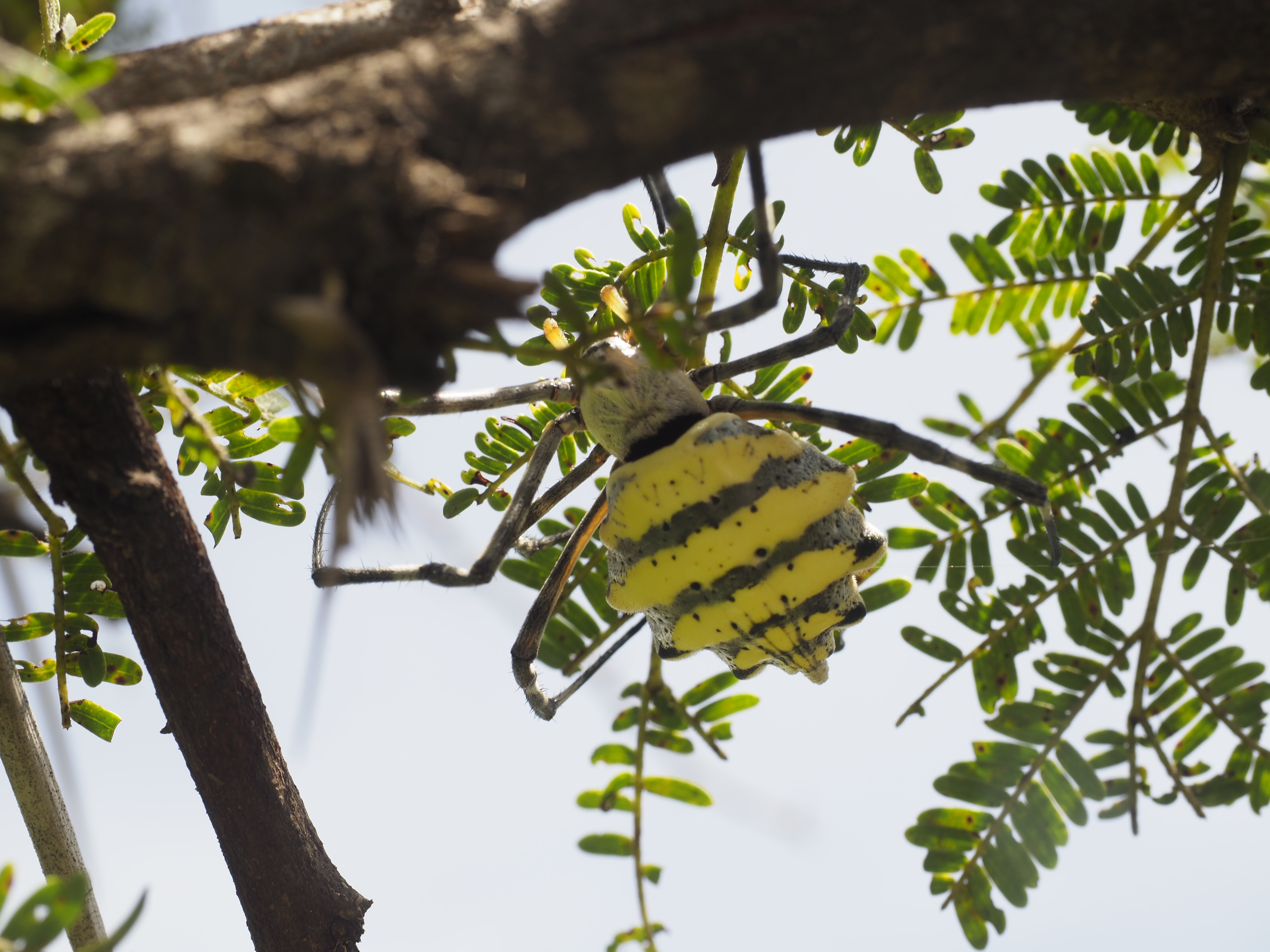
Dorsal view

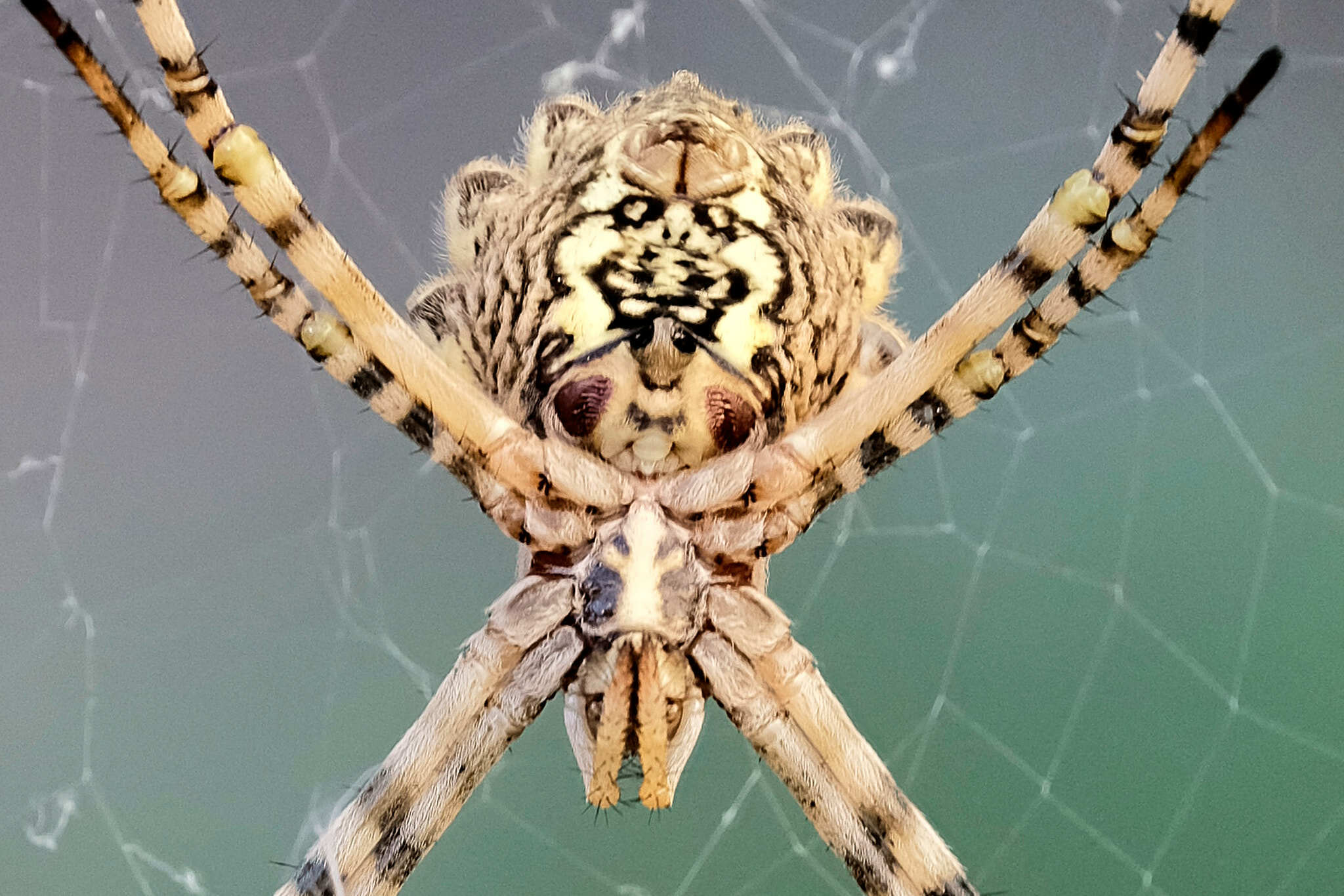
Ventral view

Like most orb-web spiders, A. australis shows considerable sexual size dimorphism; females (~25mm) are considerably larger than males (~6mm). When viewed from above, the abdomen is bright yellow with black cross-wise stripes and has an obvious knobby outline. When viewed from below the body is more finely detailed, and appears more black with patterns of yellowish spots and lines arranged symmetrically along the longitudinal axis. The legs have alternating bands of light (e.g. white, orange, yellow) and dark (brown, black) color.

== Web ==
The circular web is usually constructed among shrubbery branches in the flight path of insects within about a meter of the ground. The spider remains on the web waiting for prey to become entrapped. The same web is used for a number of days and is repaired as needed.

== Taxonomy ==
There has been considerable confusion both within the Argiope genus and the australis species. The Argiope were some of the first tropical spiders to be described, as far back as the early 1700s, probably a result of their relatively large size and colorful appearance. Because of this long history and the fact that early descriptions focused on coloration, which varies widely within a species, and abdominal shape, which is not diagnostic, numerous "different" species have been described which are in fact the same. Differences in genitalia are now recognized as being necessary for adequate diagnosis. In addition, many early descriptions were of females only; some Argiope species are still without descriptions for males.

== Conservation ==
Argiope australis is listed as Least Concern by the South African National Biodiversity Institute due to its wide geographical range. The species is protected in more than 30 protected areas including national parks and reserves in all provinces.
