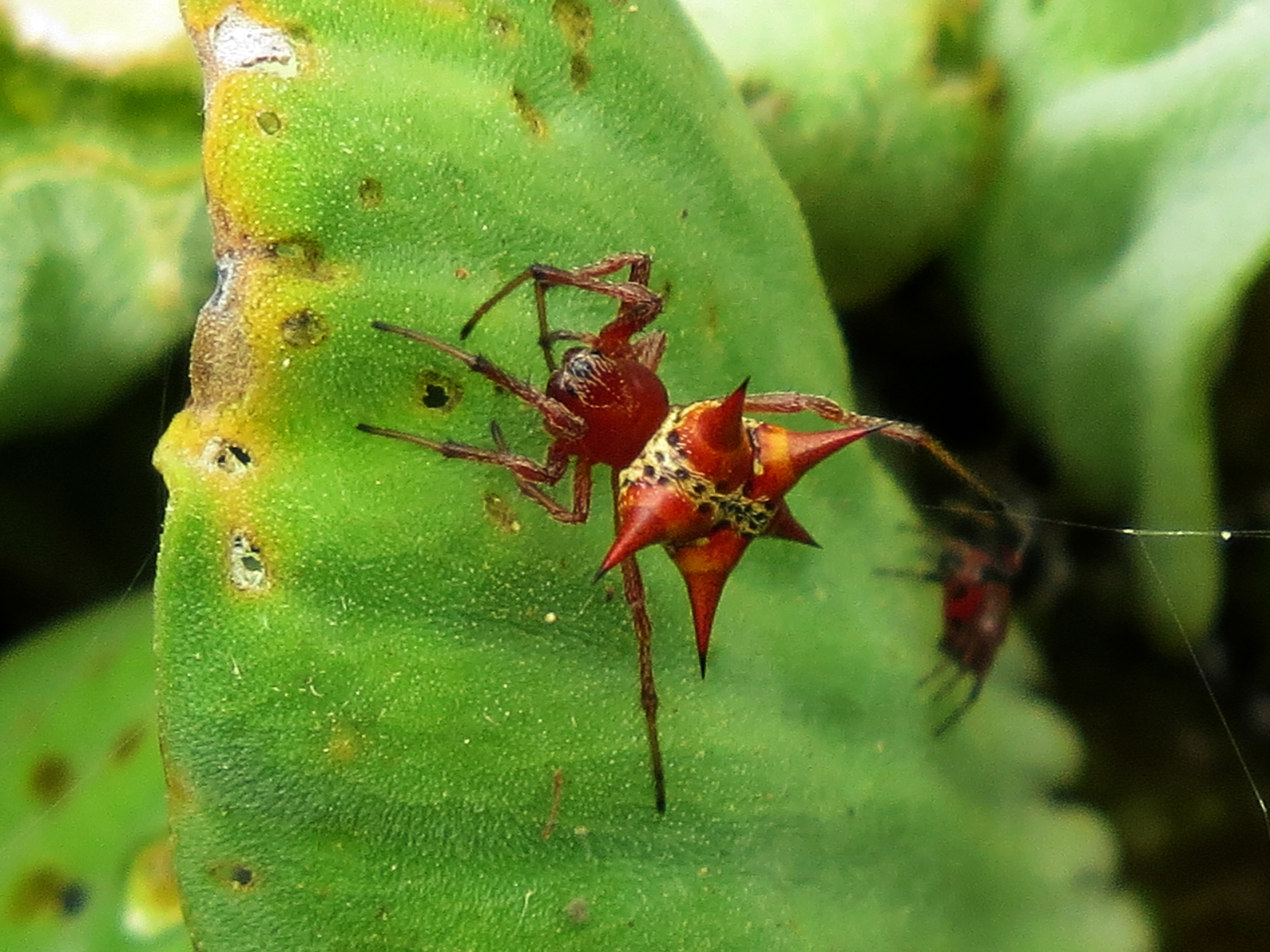
- A. pentacanthum
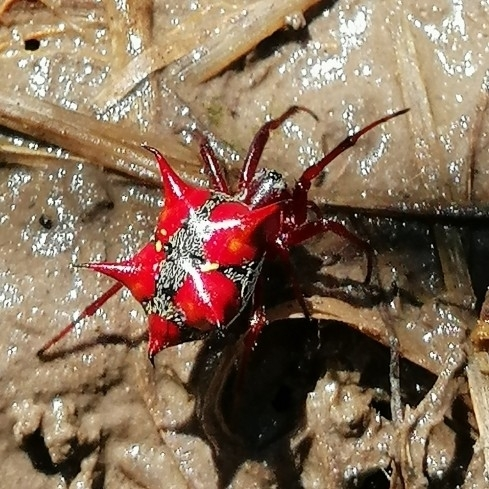
- A. pentacanthum in Bolivia

Scientific classification
- Kingdom: Animalia
- Phylum: Arthropoda
- Subphylum: Chelicerata
- Class: Arachnida
- Order: Araneae
- Infraorder: Araneomorphae
- Family: Araneidae
- Genus: Actinosoma
- Species: A. pentacanthum

Binomial name
- Actinosoma pentacanthum Holmberg, 1883

= Actinosoma =

Actinosoma pentacanthum

Genus of spiders

Actinosoma is a genus of orb-weaver spiders containing the single species, Actinosoma pentacanthum. It was first described by E. L. Holmberg in 1883, and is found throughout South America, from Colombia to Argentina.
