= List of Theridiosomatidae species =

This page lists all described species of the spider family Theridiosomatidae accepted by the World Spider Catalog as of February 2021:

== A ==
=== Andasta ===
Andasta Simon, 1895

- A. benoiti (Roberts, 1978) — Seychelles
- A. cyclosina Simon, 1901 — Malaysia
- A. semiargentea Simon, 1895 (type) — Sri Lanka
- A. siltte Saaristo, 1996 — Seychelles

== B ==
=== Baalzebub ===
Baalzebub

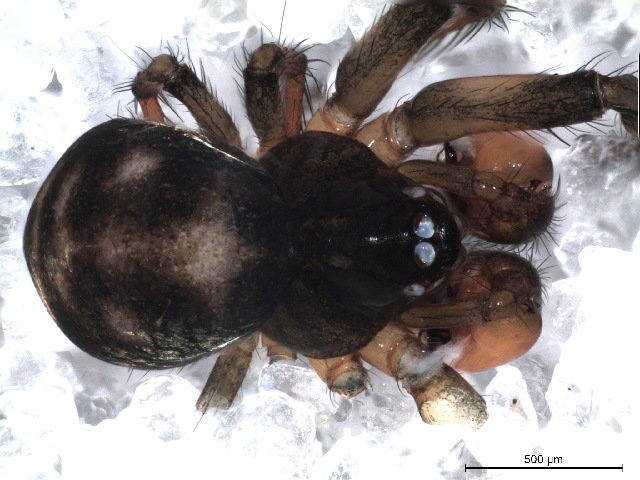
Baalzebub baubo

Baalzebub Coddington, 1986

- B. acutum Prete, Cizauskas & Brescovit, 2016 — Brazil
- B. albonotatus (Petrunkevitch, 1930) — Puerto Rico
- B. baubo Coddington, 1986 (type) — Costa Rica, Panama, Brazil
- B. brauni (Wunderlich, 1976) — Australia (Queensland)
- B. nemesis Miller, Griswold & Yin, 2009 — China
- B. rastrarius Zhao & Li, 2012 — China
- B. youyiensis Zhao & Li, 2012 — China
- † B. mesozoicum Penney, 2014

== C ==
=== Chthonopes ===
Chthonopes Wunderlich, 2011

- C. cavernicola Wunderlich, 2011 — Laos
- C. jaegeri Wunderlich, 2011 (type) — Laos
- C. thakekensis Lin, Li & Jäger, 2014 — Laos

=== Chthonos ===
Chthonos Coddington, 1986

- C. kuyllur Dupérré & Tapia, 2017 — Ecuador
- C. pectorosa (O. Pickard-Cambridge, 1882) (type) — Brazil
- C. peruana (Keyserling, 1886) — Peru
- C. quinquemucronata (Simon, 1893) — Brazil
- C. tuberosa (Keyserling, 1886) — Brazil

=== Coddingtonia ===
Coddingtonia Miller, Griswold & Yin, 2009

- C. anaktakun Labarque & Griswold, 2014 — Malaysia
- C. discobulbus (Wunderlich, 2011) — Laos
- C. erhuan Feng & Lin, 2019 — China
- C. euryopoides Miller, Griswold & Yin, 2009 (type) — China
- C. huifengi Feng & Lin, 2019 — Indonesia (Sumatra)
- C. lizu Feng & Lin, 2019 — China (Hainan)

=== Cuacuba ===
Cuacuba

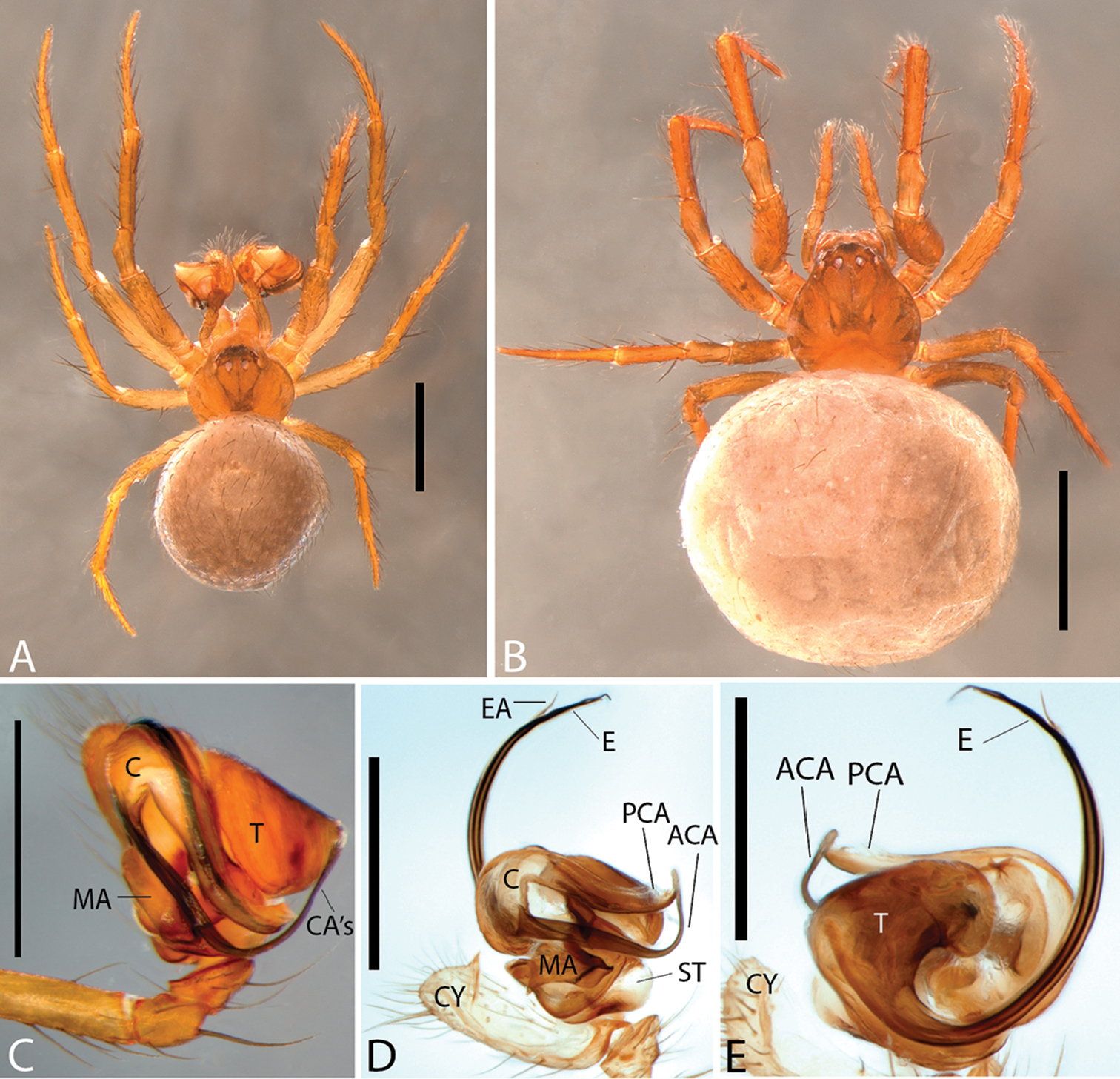
Cuacuba mariana

Cuacuba Prete, Cizauskas & Brescovit, 2018

- C. mariana Prete, Cizauskas & Brescovit, 2018 (type) — Brazil
- C. morrodopilar Prete, Cizauskas & Brescovit, 2018 — Brazil
- C. ribeira Prete & Brescovit, 2020 — Brazil

== E ==
=== † Eoepeirotypus ===
† Eoepeirotypus Wunderlich, 2004

- † E. retrobulbus Wunderlich, 2004

=== † Eotheridiosoma ===
† Eotheridiosoma Wunderlich, 2004

- † E. hamatum Wunderlich, 2011
- † E. tuber Wunderlich, 2004
- † E. volutum Wunderlich, 2004

=== Epeirotypus ===
Epeirotypus O. Pickard-Cambridge, 1894

- E. brevipes O. Pickard-Cambridge, 1894 (type) — Mexico to Costa Rica
- E. chavarria Coddington, 1986 — Costa Rica
- E. dalong Miller, Griswold & Yin, 2009 — China

=== Epilineutes ===
Epilineutes Coddington, 1986

- E. globosus (O. Pickard-Cambridge, 1896) (type) — Mexico to Brazil

== K ==
=== Karstia ===
Karstia Chen, 2010

- K. coddingtoni (Zhu, Zhang & Chen, 2001) — China
- K. cordata Dou & Lin, 2012 — China
- K. nitida Zhao & Li, 2012 — China
- K. prolata Zhao & Li, 2012 — China
- K. upperyangtzica Chen, 2010 (type) — China

== M ==
=== Menglunia ===
Menglunia Zhao & Li, 2012

- M. inaffecta Zhao & Li, 2012 (type) — China

== N ==
=== Naatlo ===
Naatlo Coddington, 1986

- N. fauna (Simon, 1897) — Costa Rica, Panama, Colombia, Venezuela, Trinidad and Tobago, Ecuador, Peru, Brazil
- N. maturaca Rodrigues & Lise, 2008 — Brazil
- N. mayzana Dupérré & Tapia, 2017 — Ecuador
- N. serrana Rodrigues & Lise, 2008 — Brazil
- N. splendida (Taczanowski, 1879) — Panama, Colombia, Venezuela, French Guiana, Ecuador, Peru, Bolivia, Brazil
- N. sutila Coddington, 1986 (type) — Panama, Colombia, Venezuela, Trinidad and Tobago, Suriname, Peru, Brazil, Argentina
- N. sylvicola (Hingston, 1932) — Venezuela, Trinidad and Tobago, Guyana

== O ==
=== Ogulnius ===
Ogulnius O. Pickard-Cambridge, 1882

- O. barbandrewsi Miller, Griswold & Yin, 2009 — China
- O. clarus Keyserling, 1886 — Brazil
- O. cubanus Archer, 1958 — Cuba
- O. fulvus Bryant, 1945 — Hispaniola
- O. gertschi Archer, 1953 — Panama
- O. gloriae (Petrunkevitch, 1930) — Puerto Rico
- O. hapalus Zhao & Li, 2012 — China
- O. hayoti Lopez, 1994 — Martinique
- O. infumatus Simon, 1898 — St. Vincent
- O. laranka Dupérré & Tapia, 2017 — Ecuador
- O. latus Bryant, 1948 — Hispaniola
- O. obscurus Keyserling, 1886 — Peru, Brazil
- O. obtectus O. Pickard-Cambridge, 1882 (type) — Brazil, Colombia, Peru
- O. paku Dupérré & Tapia, 2017 — Ecuador
- O. pallisteri Archer, 1953 — Peru
- O. pullus Bösenberg & Strand, 1906 — Korea, Japan
- O. tetrabunus (Archer, 1965) — Jamaica
- O. yaginumai Brignoli, 1981 — Philippines

== P ==
=== † Palaeoepeirotypus ===
† Palaeoepeirotypus Wunderlich, 1988

- † P. iuvenis Wunderlich, 1988
- † P. iuvenoides Wunderlich, 1988

=== Parogulnius ===
Parogulnius Archer, 1953

- P. hypsigaster Archer, 1953 (type) — USA

=== Plato ===
Plato Coddington, 1986

- P. bicolor (Keyserling, 1886) — Brazil
- P. bruneti (Gertsch, 1960) — Trinidad
- P. ferriferus Prete, Cizauskas & Brescovit, 2018 — Brazil
- P. guacharo (Brignoli, 1972) — Venezuela
- P. juberthiei Lopez, 1996 — French Guiana
- P. miranda (Brignoli, 1972) — Venezuela
- P. novalima Prete, Cizauskas & Brescovit, 2018 — Brazil
- P. striatus Prete, Cizauskas & Brescovit, 2018 — Brazil
- P. troglodita Coddington, 1986 (type) — Ecuador

== S ==
=== Sinoalaria ===
Sinoalaria Zhao & Li, 2014

- S. bicornis (Lin, Li & Jäger, 2014) — Laos
- S. cavernicola (Lin, Li & Jäger, 2014) — Laos
- S. chengguanensis (Zhao & Li, 2012) (type) — China
- S. navicularis (Lin, Li & Jäger, 2014) — Laos

=== † Spinitheridiosoma ===
† Spinitheridiosoma Wunderlich, 2004

- † S. balticum Wunderlich, 2004
- † S. bispinosum Wunderlich, 2004
- † S. rima Wunderlich, 2004

== T ==
=== Tagalogonia ===
Tagalogonia Labarque & Griswold, 2014

- T. banahaw Labarque & Griswold, 2014 (type) — Philippines
- T. isarog Labarque & Griswold, 2014 — Philippines

=== Theridiosoma ===
Theridiosoma

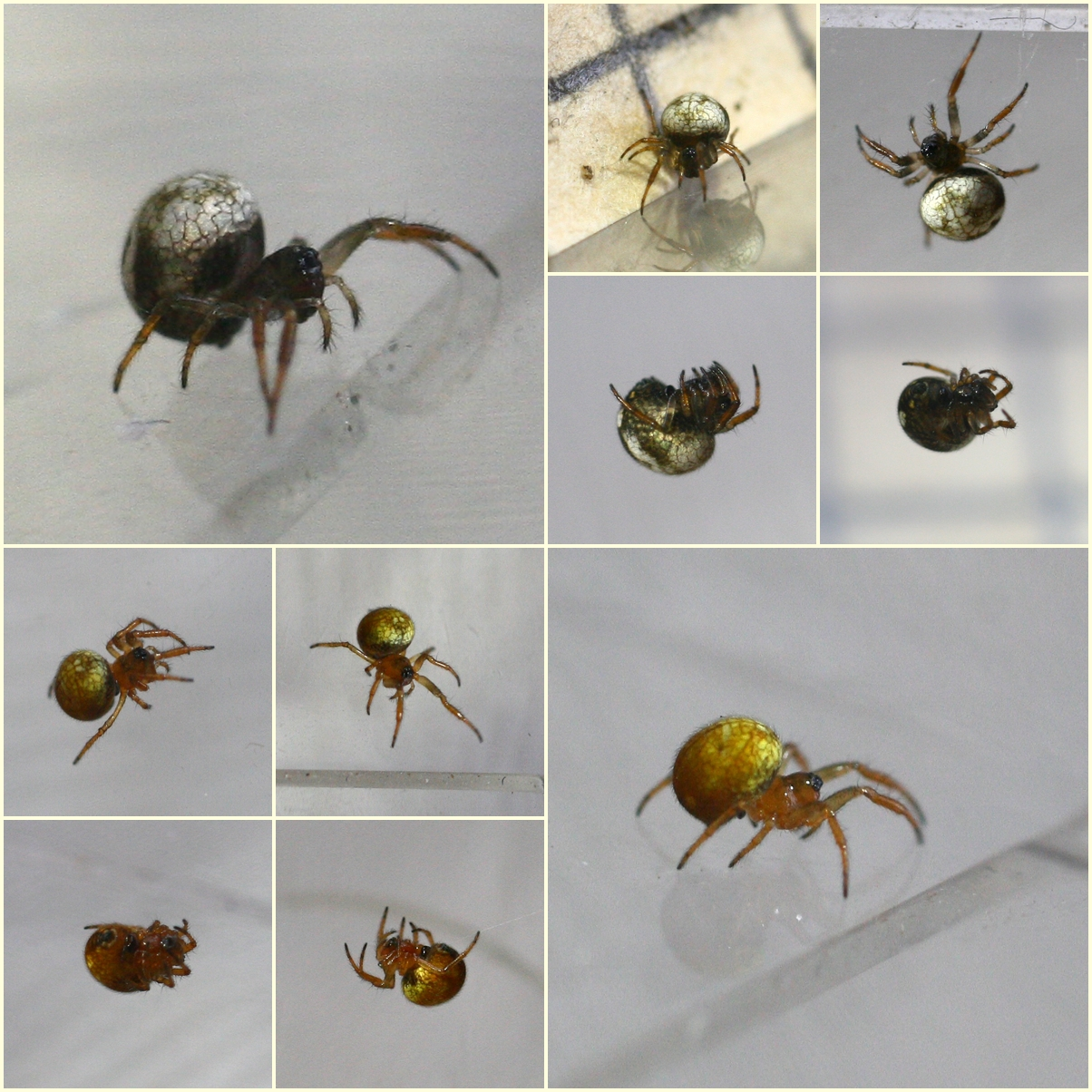
Theridiosoma gemmosum

Theridiosoma O. Pickard-Cambridge, 1879

- T. alboannulatum Suzuki, Serita & Hiramatsu, 2020 — Japan (Ryukyu Is.)
- T. ankas Dupérré & Tapia, 2017 — Ecuador
- T. argenteolunulatum Simon, 1897 — Caribbean, Venezuela
- T. blaisei Simon, 1903 — Gabon
- T. caaguara Rodrigues & Ott, 2005 — Brazil
- T. chiripa Rodrigues & Ott, 2005 — Brazil
- T. circuloargenteum Wunderlich, 1976 — Australia (New South Wales)
- T. concolor Keyserling, 1884 — Mexico, Brazil
- T. davisi Archer, 1953 — Mexico
- T. dissimulatum Suzuki, Serita & Hiramatsu, 2020 — Japan (Ryukyu Is.)
- T. diwang Miller, Griswold & Yin, 2009 — China
- T. epeiroides Bösenberg & Strand, 1906 — Russia (Far East), Korea, Japan
- T. esmeraldas Dupérré & Tapia, 2017 — Ecuador
- T. fasciatum Workman, 1896 — Singapore, Indonesia (Sumatra)
- T. fulvum Suzuki, Serita & Hiramatsu, 2020 — Japan
- T. gemmosum (L. Koch, 1877) (type) — North America, Europe, Turkey, Caucasus, Iran, Japan
- T. genevensium (Brignoli, 1972) — Sri Lanka
- T. goodnightorum Archer, 1953 — Mexico to Costa Rica
- T. kikuyu Brignoli, 1979 — Kenya
- T. kullki Dupérré & Tapia, 2017 — Ecuador
- T. latebricola Locket, 1968 — Angola
- T. lopdelli Marples, 1955 — Samoa
- T. lucidum Simon, 1897 — Venezuela
- T. nebulosum Simon, 1901 — Malaysia
- T. nechodomae Petrunkevitch, 1930 — Jamaica, Puerto Rico
- T. obscurum (Keyserling, 1886) — Brazil
- T. paludicola Suzuki, Serita & Hiramatsu, 2020 — Japan
- T. picteti Simon, 1893 — Indonesia (Sumatra)
- T. plumarium Zhao & Li, 2012 — China
- T. sacha Dupérré & Tapia, 2017 — Ecuador
- T. sancristobalensis Baert, 2014 — Ecuador (Galapagos Is.)
- T. savannum Chamberlin & Ivie, 1944 — USA
- T. shuangbi Miller, Griswold & Yin, 2009 — China
- T. triumphale Zhao & Li, 2012 — China (Hainan), Taiwan (Orchid Is./Lanyu)
- T. vimineum Zhao & Li, 2012 — China
- T. zygops (Chamberlin & Ivie, 1936) — Panama
- † T. incompletum Wunderlich, 1988

== U ==
=== † Umerosoma ===
† Umerosoma Wunderlich, 2004

- † U. multispina Wunderlich, 2004

== W ==
=== Wendilgarda ===
Wendilgarda

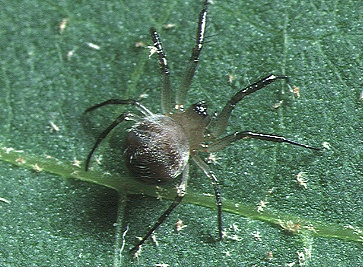
Wendilgarda sp.

Wendilgarda Keyserling, 1886

- W. assamensis Fage, 1924 — India, China
- W. atricolor (Simon, 1907) — São Tomé and Príncipe
- W. clara Keyserling, 1886 — Caribbean, Guatemala to Brazil
- W. galapagensis Archer, 1953 — Costa Rica (Cocos Is.)
- W. liliwensis Barrion & Litsinger, 1995 — Philippines
- W. mexicana Keyserling, 1886 (type) — Mexico, Central America, Cuba
- W. muji Miller, Griswold & Yin, 2009 — China
- W. mustelina Simon, 1898 — St. Vincent
  - W. m. arnouxi Lopez & Emerit, 1986 — Guadeloupe
- W. nigra Keyserling, 1886 — Brazil
- W. nipponica Shinkai, 2009 — Japan
- W. panjanensis Barrion, Barrion-Dupo & Heong, 2013 — China (Hainan)
- W. ruficeps Suzuki, 2019 — Japan
- W. sinensis Zhu & Wang, 1992 — China

== Z ==
=== Zoma ===
Zoma Saaristo, 1996

- Z. dibaiyin Miller, Griswold & Yin, 2009 — China, Japan
- Z. fascia Zhao & Li, 2012 — China
- Z. taiwanica (Zhang, Zhu & Tso, 2006) — Taiwan
- Z. zoma Saaristo, 1996 (type) — Seychelles
