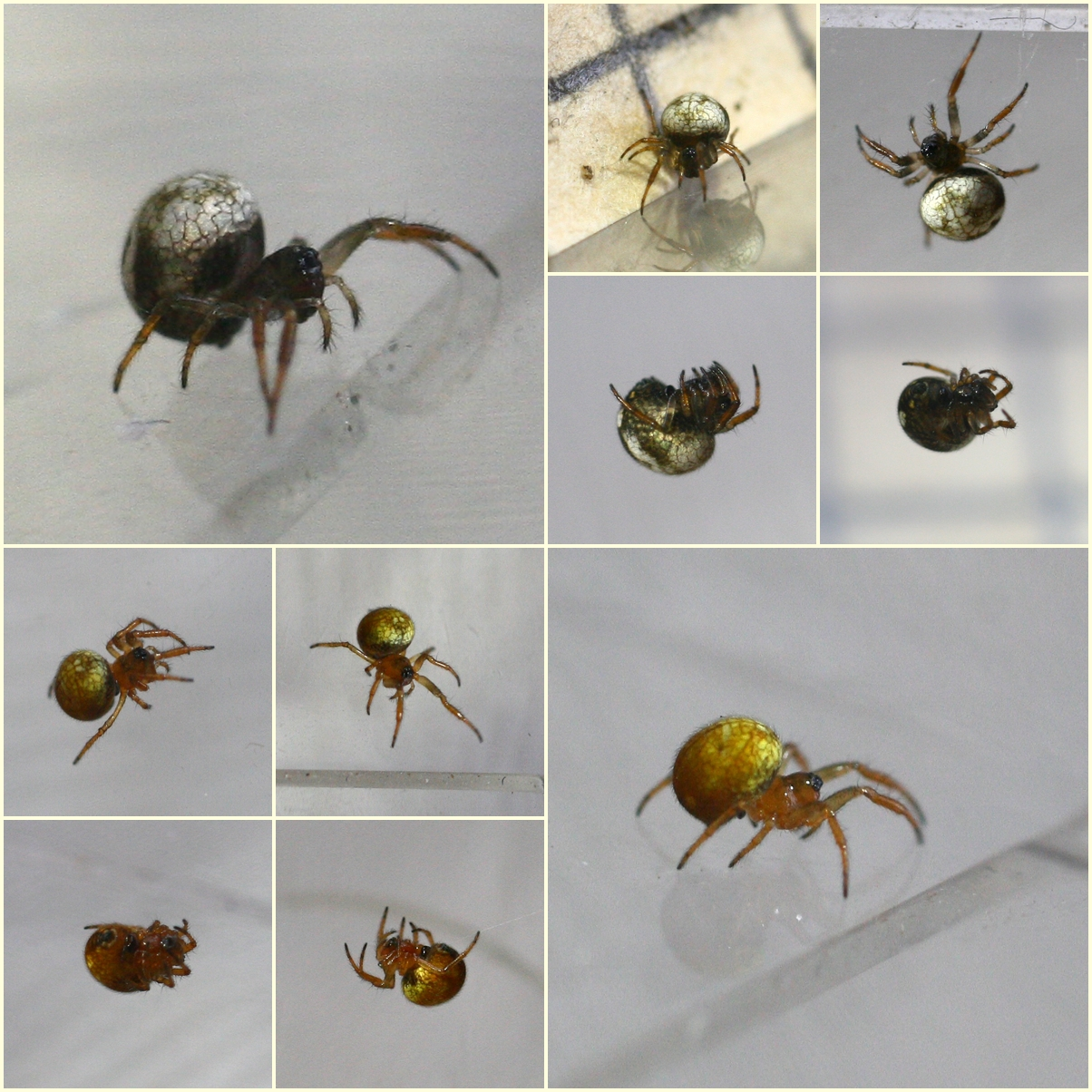
- T. gemmosum

Scientific classification
- Kingdom: Animalia
- Phylum: Arthropoda
- Subphylum: Chelicerata
- Class: Arachnida
- Order: Araneae
- Infraorder: Araneomorphae
- Family: Theridiosomatidae
- Genus: Theridiosoma; O. Pickard-Cambridge, 1879

Type species
- T. gemmosum (L. Koch, 1877)

Species
- 33, see text

Synonyms
- Theridilella Chamberlin & Ivie, 1936

= Theridiosoma =

Theridiosoma Temporal range: Neogene– Present

Genus of spiders

Theridiosoma is a genus of ray spiders that was first described by Octavius Pickard-Cambridge in 1879. They use their web as a high speed slingshot to actively hunt for prey.

== Description ==
Mature spiders in this genus have a body length of 0.5–2.5 mm. The carapace ranges from dark brown to light tan, sometimes with distinct markings around the eye region or fovea, The sternum is smooth, with sparse bristles, and is usually darker towards the margin. A pit organ is present on the anterior margin of the sternum, at both corners. The abdomen is ovoid in shape, and taller than wide or long; the dorsal side of the abdomen often bears a light, thin median band and/or symmetrical light spots, the ventral side is dark. The metatarsi of the legs are typically shorter than the tibiae. As with other spiders in the family, the tibiae of the 3rd and 4th legs bear a group of long, vibration-sensitive trichobothria. Species in this genus exhibit only slight sexual dimorphism; males are similar to females in colouration but are slightly smaller, with proportionally longer legs.

The eyes are all approximately equal in size. The PME are very close together, sometimes touching, separated by less than half their diameter. The AME are also close together, but are typically separated by around half their diameter.

== Distribution and habitat ==
This genus is found throughout the world. Their preferred habitat is typical for the family; they construct a web in wet, shaded understories of forests,

== Behaviour ==
All species construct a vertical orb web in dark, damp places. At the end of web construction, the radial threads are fused at the centre so that only four, the "rays", reach the hub. The spider's rear legs are used to hold these rays while the front legs hold onto an extra line of thread, which is used to pull the web into a cone and keep it under tension. When potential prey nears the web the spider releases the tension in the web, causing it to slam into the prey. The spider then bites the prey, and wraps it in silk. The speeds with which the spiders slingshot themselves is very high; speeds exceeding 4.1 m/s with accelerations exceeding 1300 m/s^{2} have been observed.

== Species ==
As of June 2020 it contains thirty-three species, found in Oceania, Asia, Central America, Africa, South America, North America, Europe, and the Caribbean:

- Theridiosoma ankas Dupérré & Tapia, 2017 – Ecuador
- Theridiosoma argenteolunulatum Simon, 1897 – Caribbean, Venezuela
- Theridiosoma blaisei Simon, 1903 – Gabon
- Theridiosoma caaguara Rodrigues & Ott, 2005 – Brazil
- Theridiosoma chiripa Rodrigues & Ott, 2005 – Brazil
- Theridiosoma circuloargenteum Wunderlich, 1976 – Australia (New South Wales)
- Theridiosoma concolor Keyserling, 1884 – Mexico, Brazil
- Theridiosoma davisi Archer, 1953 – Mexico
- Theridiosoma diwang Miller, Griswold & Yin, 2009 – China
- Theridiosoma epeiroides Bösenberg & Strand, 1906 – Russia (Far East), Korea, Japan
- Theridiosoma esmeraldas Dupérré & Tapia, 2017 – Ecuador
- Theridiosoma fasciatum Workman, 1896 – Singapore, Indonesia (Sumatra)
- Theridiosoma gemmosum (L. Koch, 1877) (type) – North America, Europe, Turkey, Caucasus, Iran, Japan
- Theridiosoma genevensium (Brignoli, 1972) – Sri Lanka
- Theridiosoma goodnightorum Archer, 1953 – Mexico to Costa Rica
- Theridiosoma kikuyu Brignoli, 1979 – Kenya
- Theridiosoma kullki Dupérré & Tapia, 2017 – Ecuador
- Theridiosoma latebricola Locket, 1968 – Angola
- Theridiosoma lopdelli Marples, 1955 – Samoa
- Theridiosoma lucidum Simon, 1897 – Venezuela
- Theridiosoma nebulosum Simon, 1901 – Malaysia
- Theridiosoma nechodomae Petrunkevitch, 1930 – Jamaica, Puerto Rico
- Theridiosoma obscurum (Keyserling, 1886) – Brazil
- Theridiosoma picteti Simon, 1893 – Indonesia (Sumatra)
- Theridiosoma plumarium Zhao & Li, 2012 – China
- Theridiosoma sacha Dupérré & Tapia, 2017 – Ecuador
- Theridiosoma sancristobalensis Baert, 2014 – Ecuador (Galapagos Is.)
- Theridiosoma savannum Chamberlin & Ivie, 1944 – USA
- Theridiosoma shuangbi Miller, Griswold & Yin, 2009 – China
- Theridiosoma taiwanica Zhang, Zhu & Tso, 2006 – Taiwan
- Theridiosoma triumphale Zhao & Li, 2012 – China
- Theridiosoma vimineum Zhao & Li, 2012 – China
- Theridiosoma zygops (Chamberlin & Ivie, 1936) – Panama

Formerly included:

- T. albonotatum Petrunkevitch, 1930 (Transferred to Baalzebub)
- T. benoiti Roberts, 1978 (Transferred to Andasta)
- T. brauni Wunderlich, 1976 (Transferred to Baalzebub)
- T. fauna Simon, 1897 (Transferred to Naatlo)
- T. nigrum (Keyserling, 1886) (Transferred to Wendilgarda)
- T. semiargenteum (Simon, 1895) (Transferred to Andasta)
- T. splendidum (Taczanowski, 1873) (Transferred to Naatlo)
- T. sylvicola Hingston, 1932 (Transferred to Naatlo)
