= Sennin (spider) =

Scientific classification
- Kingdom: Animalia
- Phylum: Arthropoda
- Subphylum: Chelicerata
- Class: Arachnida
- Order: Araneae
- Infraorder: Araneomorphae
- Family: Theridiosomatidae
- Genus: Sennin; Suzuki, Hiramatsu & Tatsuta, 2022

Type species
- Sennin tanikawai Suzuki, Hiramatsu & Tatsuta, 2022

Species
- See text.

Genus of spiders

Sennin is a troglophilic genus of spiders in the family Theridiosomatidae which was discovered in 2022 containing four species.

Identifiable features which distinguish this genus are: an apophysis located on the dorsal aspect of the cymbium on the male palpal bulb, an embolus segmentation containing 3 long apophyses, a median apophysis on the male pedipalp reminiscent of spiders in the genus Baalzebub, an epigynal plate bearing two triangular sclerotised protrusions on the plates anterior margin, and an epigynum featuring lengthened copulatory ducts which coil on the spermathecae's basal side.

== Species ==
Four species belonging to this genus have been discovered as of 2025:

- Sennin coddingtoni Suzuki, Hiramatsu & Tatsuta, 2022
- Sennin tanikawai Suzuki, Hiramatsu & Tatsuta, 2022
- Sennin shuanglong Yao & Liu, 2023
- Sennin zhangxinae Lin & Li, 2024

== Relation to the Theridiosomatinae ==
Sennin bears similarities to the genera Baalzebub and Karstia, which would place Sennin in the subfamily Theridiosomatinae and polyphlyletically separate Baalzebub and Karstia. However a phylogenetic study has not yet been conducted to support this.
