= Bharatasoma =

Scientific classification
- Kingdom: Animalia
- Phylum: Arthropoda
- Subphylum: Chelicerata
- Class: Arachnida
- Order: Araneae
- Infraorder: Araneomorphae
- Family: Theridiosomatidae
- Genus: Bharatasoma; Marusik, 2023
- Species: B. eskovi

Binomial name
- Bharatasoma eskovi Marusik, 2023

Species of spider

Bharatasoma is a monotypic genus of spiders in the family Theridiosomatidae containing the single species, Bharatasoma eskovi. Bharatasoma eskovi is endemic to India.

The genus name is a combination of the Sanskrit name for India, भरत (bharata) and the ending of Theridiosoma. The species is named in honor of Kirill Yeskov.
