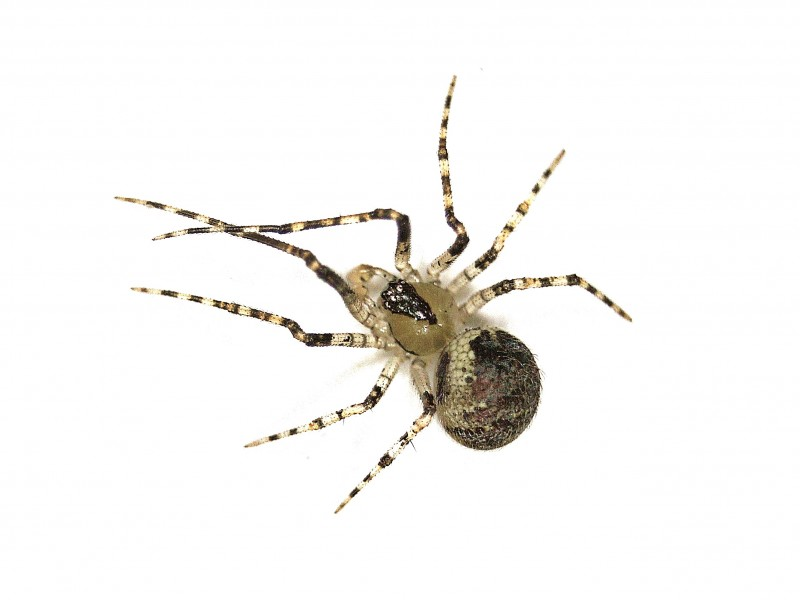
- P. tincta

Scientific classification
- Kingdom: Animalia
- Phylum: Arthropoda
- Subphylum: Chelicerata
- Class: Arachnida
- Order: Araneae
- Infraorder: Araneomorphae
- Family: Theridiidae
- Genus: Platnickina; Koçak & Kemal, 2008

Type species
- P. maculata (Yoshida, 2001)

Species
- 15, see text

= Platnickina =

Genus of spiders

Platnickina is a genus of comb-footed spiders. The type species was described by Walckenaer in 1802. The modern taxonomy was given by A. Ö. Koçak & M. Kemal in 2008, and named in honour of Norman Platnick.

== Distribution ==
Spiders in this genus are found worldwide.

== Description ==
As comb-footed spiders, Platnickina have two body segments (prosoma and opisthosoma) and eight legs. The tarsi of the final leg pair have rows of strong, serrated bristles ventrally.

Platnickina can be distinguished from other theridiid genera by the presence of trichobothria on the metatarsi of the third leg pair, the opisthosoma not being higher than it is long, and the absence of a colulus. Also, the European species at least are bright yellow with black mottling.

== Species ==
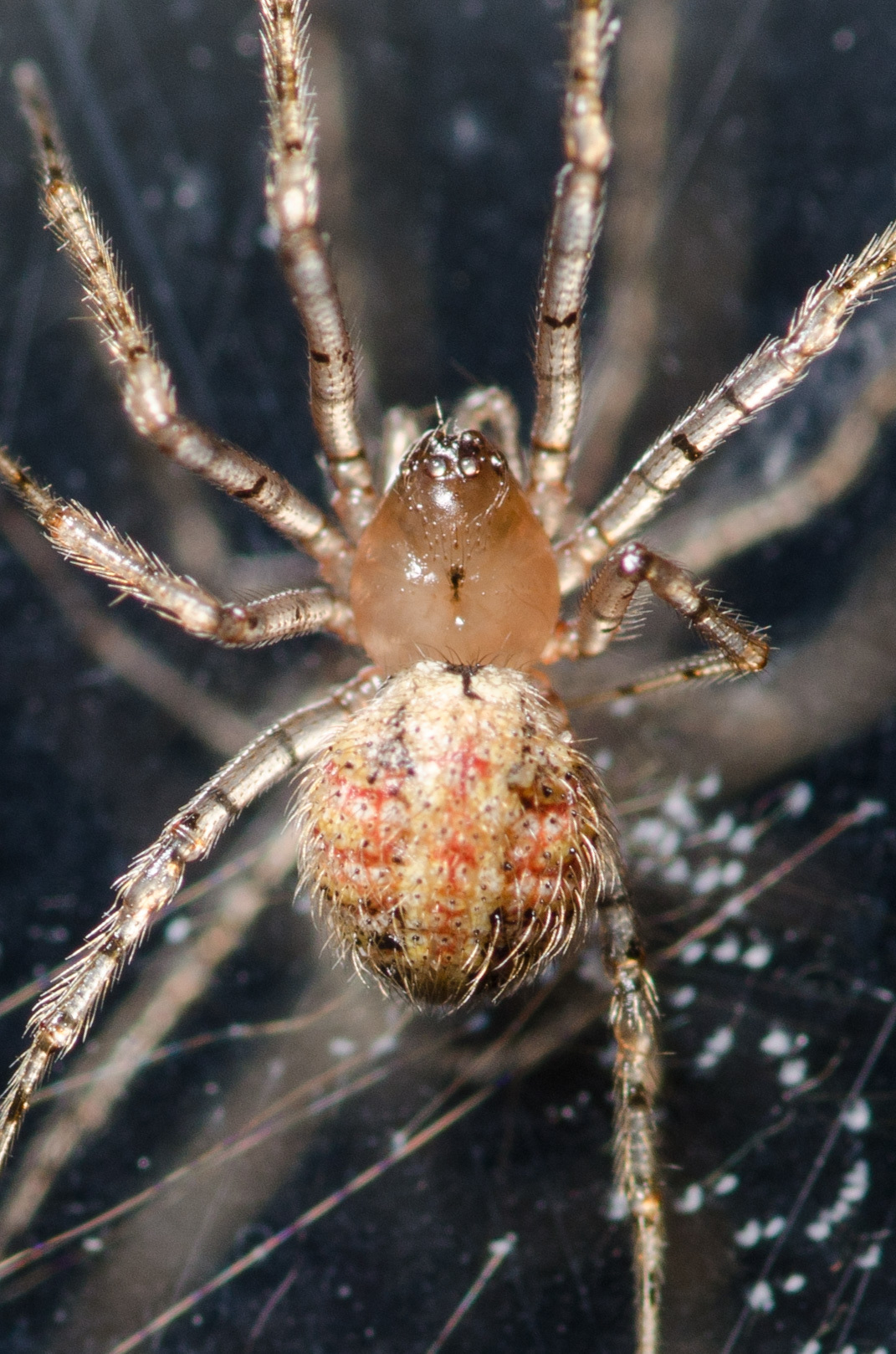
female P. adamsoni

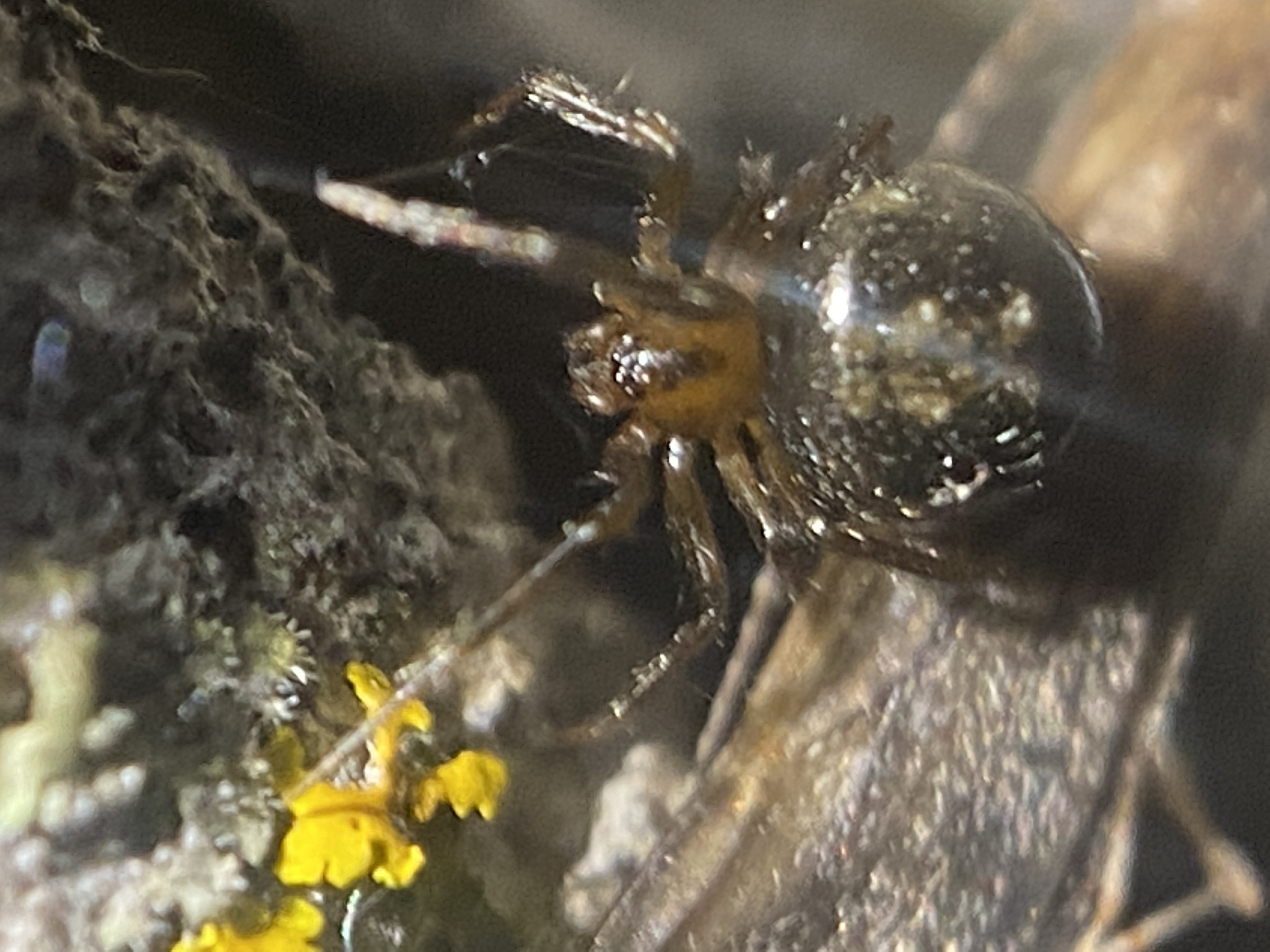
P. alabamensis

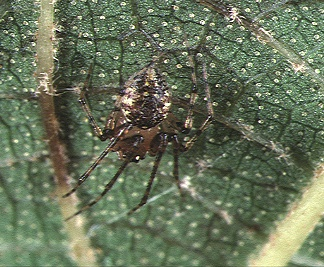
female P. maculata from Okinawa

As of October 2025, this genus includes fifteen species:

- Platnickina adamsoni (Berland, 1934) – United States, Caribbean, South America. Introduced to St. Helena, Ascension Is. Ghana, South Africa, Seychelles, China, Korea, Japan, Pacific Is.
- Platnickina alabamensis (Gertsch & Archer, 1942) – Canada, United States
- Platnickina antoni (Keyserling, 1884) – United States
- Platnickina fritilla Gao & Li, 2014 – China
- Platnickina kijabei (Berland, 1920) – Cape Verde, Kenya
- Platnickina maculata (Yoshida, 2001) – Japan (type species)
- Platnickina nigropunctata (Lucas, 1846) – Mediterranean
- Platnickina obscurata (Zhu, 1998) – China
- Platnickina punctosparsa (Emerton, 1882) – United States
- Platnickina qionghaiensis (Zhu, 1998) – China
- Platnickina sterninotata (Bösenberg & Strand, 1906) – Russia (Far East), China, Korea, Japan
- Platnickina submaculata Hu & Liu, 2025 – China
- Platnickina tincta (Walckenaer, 1802) – Europe, Turkey, Caucasus, Russia (Europe to South Siberia), Kazakhstan, Iran. Introduced to North America
- Platnickina xianfengensis (Zhu & Song, 1992) – China, Taiwan
- Platnickina yoshidai Hu & Liu, 2025 – China

In synonymy:

- P. adamsoni (Berland, 1934) = Platnickina mneon (Bösenberg & Strand, 1906)
- P. blatchleyi (Bryant, 1945) = Platnickina mneon (Bösenberg & Strand, 1906)
- P. cinerascens (Roewer, 1942) = Platnickina alabamensis (Gertsch & Archer, 1942)
- P. hobbsi (Gertsch & Archer, 1942) = Platnickina mneon (Bösenberg & Strand, 1906)
- P. insulicola (Bryant, 1947) = Platnickina mneon (Bösenberg & Strand, 1906)
- P. talmo (Chamberlin & Ivie, 1944) = Platnickina alabamensis (Gertsch & Archer, 1942)

== See also ==
- List of spiders of Texas
