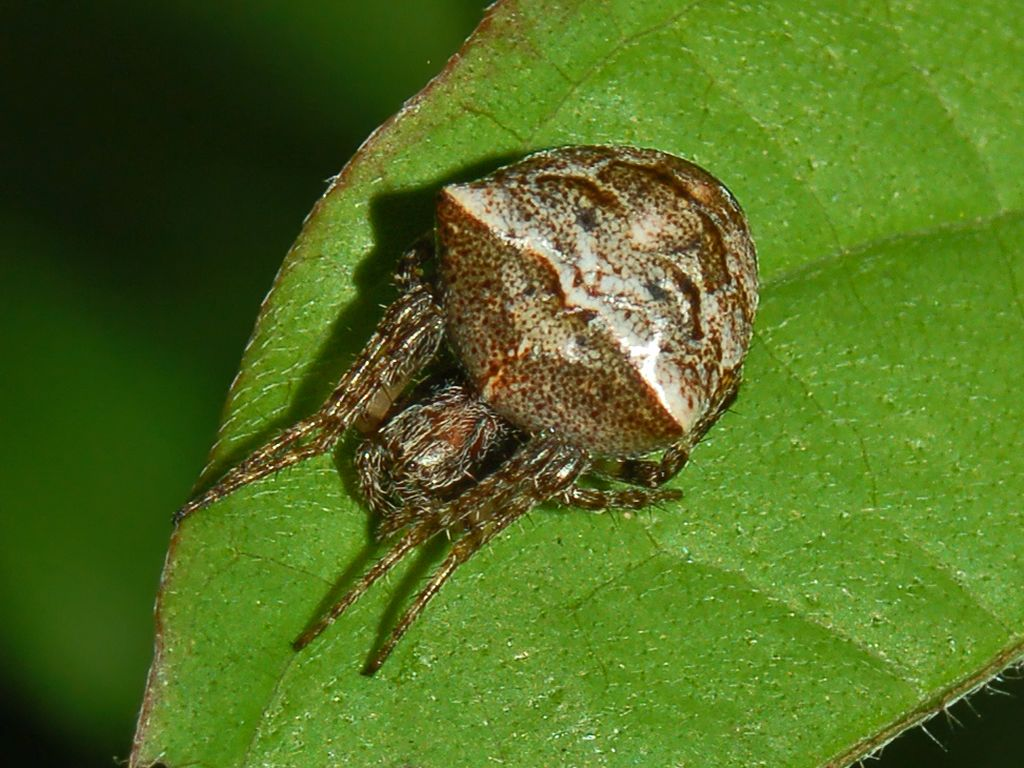
- Gibbaranea bituberculata

Scientific classification
- Kingdom: Animalia
- Phylum: Arthropoda
- Subphylum: Chelicerata
- Class: Arachnida
- Order: Araneae
- Infraorder: Araneomorphae
- Family: Araneidae
- Genus: Gibbaranea; Archer, 1951

Type species
- G. bituberculata (Walckenaer, 1802)

Species
- 12, see text

= Gibbaranea =

Genus of spiders

Gibbaranea is a genus of orb-weaver spiders first described by Allan Frost Archer in 1951.

== Species ==
As of November 2026 it contains twelve species:

- Gibbaranea abscissa (Karsch, 1879) – Far East, China, Korea, Japan
- Gibbaranea bifida Guo, Zhang & Zhu, 2011 – China
- Gibbaranea bituberculata (Walckenaer, 1802) – Europe, Turkey, Israel, Russia (Europe to Far East), Central Asia to China, Japan, India, North Africa, Caucasus, Iraq, Iran, Kazakhstan
- Gibbaranea bruuni Lissner, 2016 – Portugal, Spain, Algeria, Tunisia
- Gibbaranea gibbosa (Walckenaer, 1802) – Europe, Turkey, Caucasus, Iran
- Gibbaranea hetian (Hu & Wu, 1989) – South Siberia, China, Mongolia
- Gibbaranea indiana Roy, Saha & Raychaudhuri, 2015 – India
- Gibbaranea nanguosa Yin & Gong, 1996 – China
- Gibbaranea occidentalis Wunderlich, 1989 – Azores
- Gibbaranea omoeda (Thorell, 1870) – Europe, Russia (Europe to Far East), Japan
- Gibbaranea tenerifensis Wunderlich, 1992 – Canary Islands
- Gibbaranea ullrichi (Hahn, 1835) – Europe to Central Asia, Pakistan
