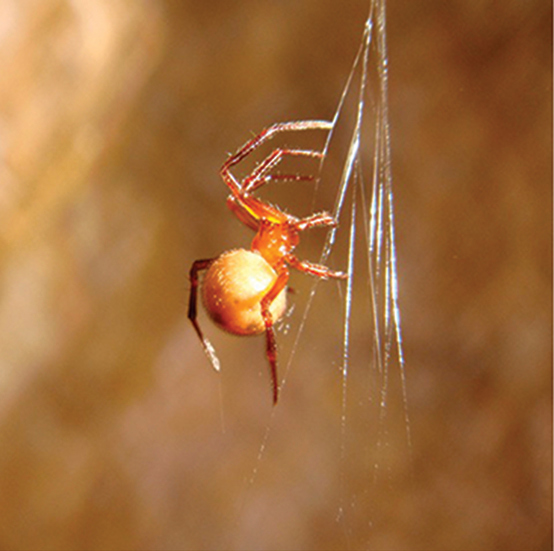
- P. ferriferus on its web in Parauapebas, Brazil
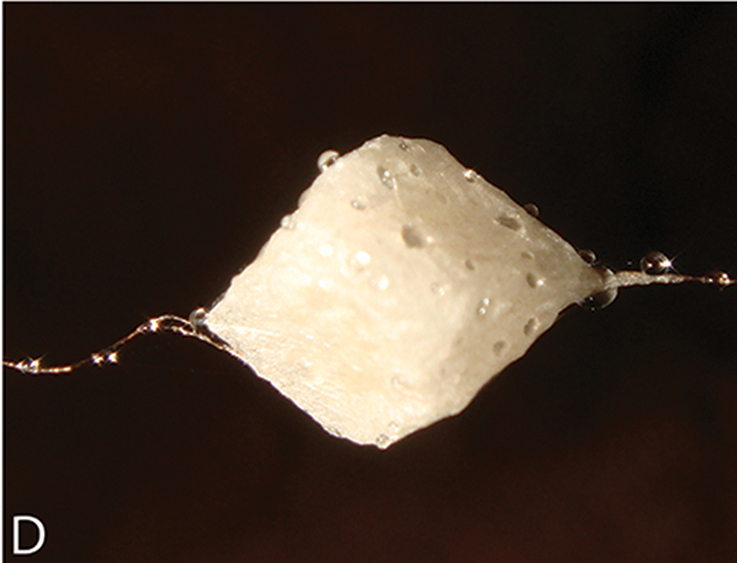
- The cubic egg sac of P. ferriferus in Parauapebas, Brazil

Scientific classification
- Domain: Eukaryota
- Kingdom: Animalia
- Phylum: Arthropoda
- Subphylum: Chelicerata
- Class: Arachnida
- Order: Araneae
- Infraorder: Araneomorphae
- Family: Theridiosomatidae
- Genus: Plato; Coddington, 1986

Type species
- Plato troglodita Coddington, 1986

= Plato (spider) =

Genus of spiders

Plato is a genus of ray spider (family Theridiosomatidae). The American biologist Jonathan A. Coddington named and circumscribed the genus in 1986. It is a Neotropical genus and it is limited to South America. As of 2018, nine species were recognized. They are found in caves and have a distinctive cubic egg sac. The generic name comes from the ancient Greek philosopher Plato.

== Description ==
The eye arrangement of spiders in the genus Plato

The head region of the carapace is tan, and not especially elevated. The sternum is also tan, sometimes darker, as wide as long, convex, and rounds towards the rear. The abdomen is light grey or tan, with no clear markings, and bears sparse setae. The legs are long and slender, pale tan in colour without annulations. Although the genus is troglobitic, they have no specific modifications for living in caves or other dark places.

The clypeal height is 3x the diameter of the AME. All of the eyes are roughly the same size, although the lateral eyes may be slightly smaller. The AME are separated by half their diameter, and the PME are separated by at least their diameter.

Diagnostic features include: the base of the epigynum in female Plato species having a median projection; the cymbium having distal or mesal groves; and the underside of the male conductor having a curved apophysis.

== Habitat and distribution ==
Plato is found in the Neotropical realm. Its range is limited to South America (including the island of Trinidad), within the countries Brazil, Ecuador, Trinidad & Tobago, and Venezuela, as well as in the French overseas region French Guiana. Their orb webs hang from the ceilings and walls near the entrance of caves. They are typically found in humid environments, near streams or other bodies of water.

== Behaviour ==
As with other ray spiders, Plato constructs an orb web, although their webs lack a tension line. Their egg sacs are cubical, and are suspended in long threads from their vertices. Each egg sac can contain between eight and seventeen eggs. The diet of Plato species consists of small flying insects such as chironomids and other flies, tineid moths, and caddisflies.

== Species ==
As of 2018, the World Spider Catalog recognizes the following nine species:

- P. bicolor (Keyserling, 1886) — Brazil
- P. bruneti (Gertsch, 1960) — Trinidad
- P. ferriferus Prete et al., 2018 — Brazil
- P. guacharo (Brignoli, 1972) — Venezuela
- P. juberthiei Lopez, 1996 — French Guiana
- P. miranda (Brignoli, 1972) — Venezuela
- P. novalima Prete et al., 2018 — Brazil
- P. striatus Prete et al., 2018 — Brazil
- P. troglodita Coddington, 1986 — Ecuador

== Taxonomic history ==
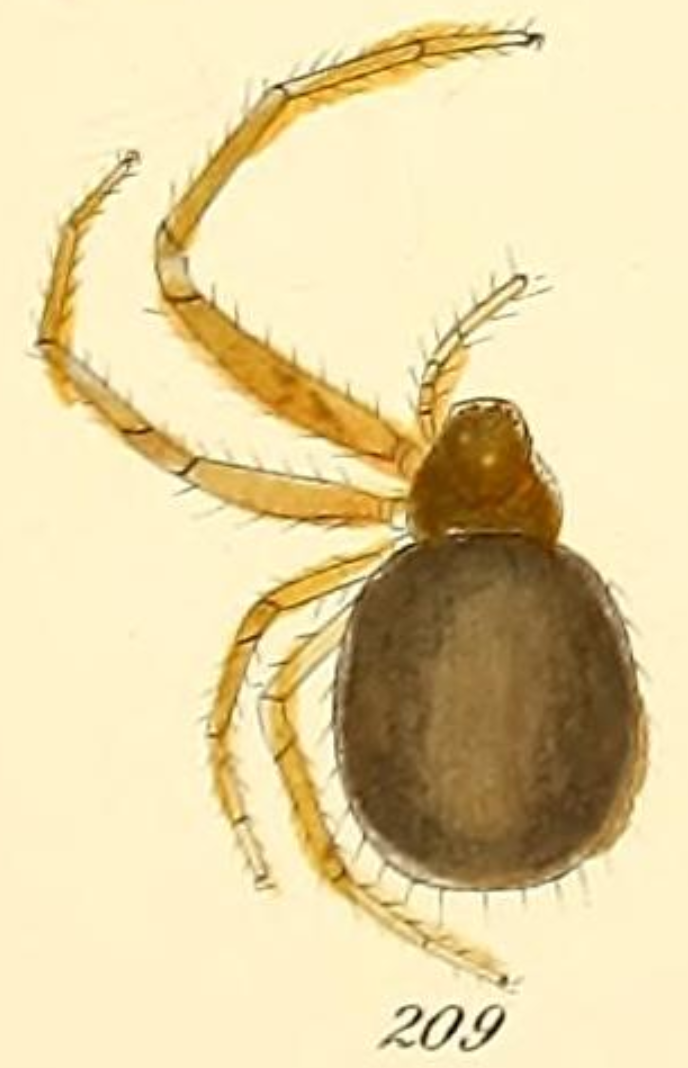
Female P. bicolor, illustrated by Eugen von Keyserling in 1886

Jonathan A. Coddington, a biologist at the National Museum of Natural History, circumscribed the genus Plato in a 1986 revision of the family Theridiosomatidae. He designated P. troglodita, which he described in the same work, to be the type species of the genus. The other species he included in his initial circumscription had been initially described in the genera Maymena (P. bruneti) and Wendilgarda (P. miranda, P. guacharo, and P. bicolor). André Lopez at the Centre national de la recherche scientifique described P. juberthiei in 1996, and Pedro H. Prete and colleagues at the Instituto Butantan described the three species P. novalima, P. ferriferus, and P. striatus in 2018.

Coddington named the genus after the ancient Greek philosopher Plato. Coddington's reasoning were their "strikingly cubical egg sacs" and their "partiality for caves." These relate to the philosopher by way of the Platonic solids and the Allegory of the Cave, respectively. The generic name is masculine in gender.

Coddington placed Plato in a new subfamily Platoninae, alongside the genus Chthonos. In 2011, the German arachnologist Joerg Wunderlich changed the status of Platoninae to be the tribe Platonini in the subfamily Theridiosomatinae instead, although Prete and colleagues followed Coddington in having Plato in the subfamily Platoninae.

== See also ==
- List of organisms named after famous people (born before 1800)
