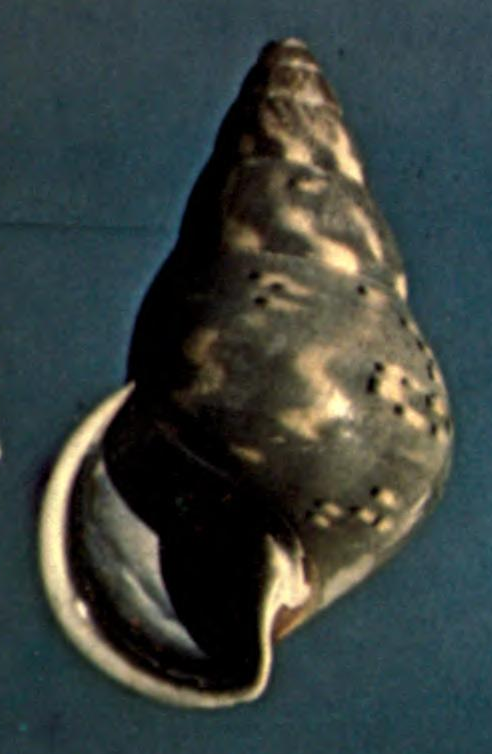
- apertural view of the shell of Amphidromus coeruleus

Scientific classification
- Kingdom: Animalia
- Phylum: Mollusca
- Class: Gastropoda
- Order: Stylommatophora
- Family: Camaenidae
- Genus: Amphidromus
- Species: A. coeruleus

Binomial name
- Amphidromus coeruleus Clench & Archer, 1932

Synonyms
- Amphidromus (Syndromus) coeruleus Clench & Archer, 1932 · alternative representation; Amphidromus (Syndromus) stanyi Dharma, 2021 junior subjective synonym; Amphidromus stanyi Dharma, 2021 junior subjective synonym

= Amphidromus coeruleus =

Species of gastropod

Amphidromus coeruleus is a species of air-breathing land snail, a terrestrial pulmonate gastropod mollusk in the family Camaenidae.

== Distribution ==
Amphidromus coeruleus occurs on Borneo.
