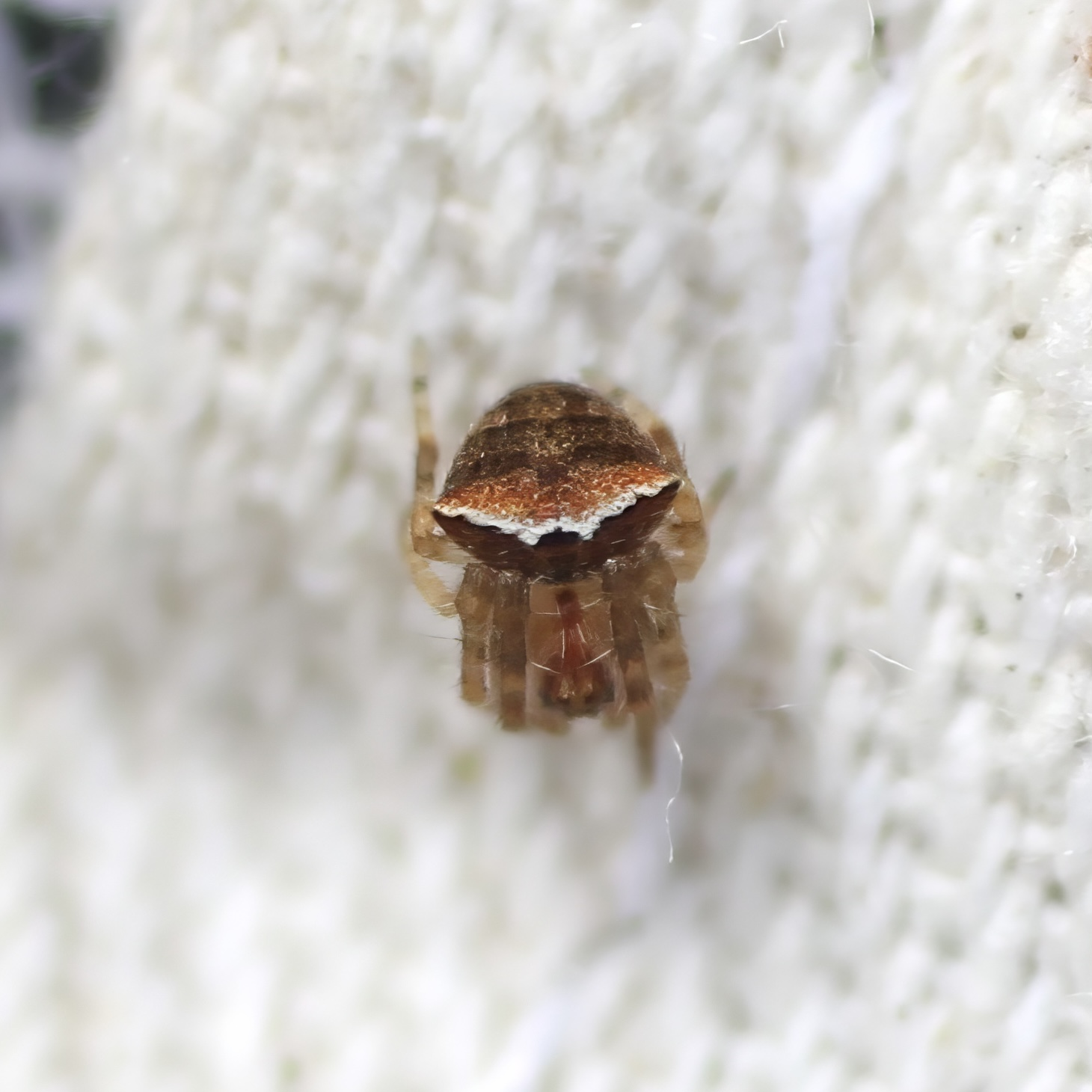

Scientific classification
- Kingdom: Animalia
- Phylum: Arthropoda
- Subphylum: Chelicerata
- Class: Arachnida
- Order: Araneae
- Infraorder: Araneomorphae
- Family: Araneidae
- Genus: Araneus
- Species: A. montereyensis

Binomial name
- Araneus montereyensis (Archer, 1951)

= Araneus montereyensis =

Species of spider

Araneus montereyensis is a comparatively small species of orb weaver in the spider family Araneidae. It is found in North America. A. montereyensis somewhat resembles Araneus bispinosus but its anterior humps are smaller. Most commonly observed in California during the dry season, this spider "has been found in the low branches of trees, shrubs in oak woodlands, chaparral, and in ornamental plantings."
