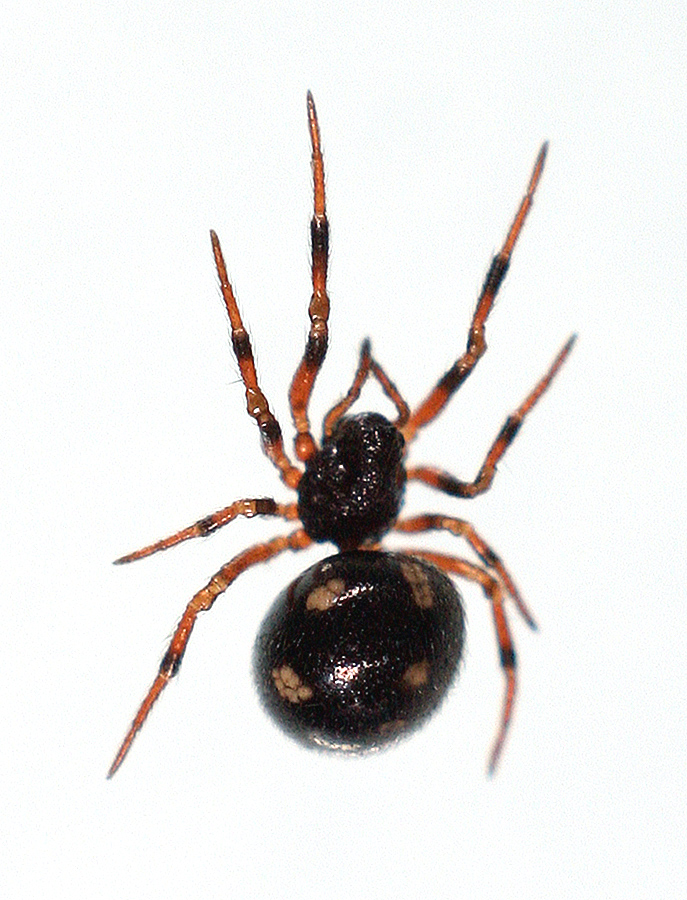
- C. guttata

Scientific classification
- Kingdom: Animalia
- Phylum: Arthropoda
- Subphylum: Chelicerata
- Class: Arachnida
- Order: Araneae
- Infraorder: Araneomorphae
- Family: Theridiidae
- Genus: Crustulina; Menge, 1868

Type species
- C. guttata (Wider, 1834)

Species
- 17, see text

= Crustulina =

Genus of spiders

Crustulina is a genus of comb-footed spiders that was first described by Anton Menge in 1868.

== Species ==
As of May 2020 it contains seventeen species, found in Oceania, Africa, Asia, North America, and Europe:

- Crustulina albovittata (Thorell, 1875) – Ukraine
- Crustulina altera Gertsch & Archer, 1942 – USA
- Crustulina ambigua Simon, 1889 – Madagascar
- Crustulina bicruciata Simon, 1908 – Australia (Western Australia)
- Crustulina conspicua (O. Pickard-Cambridge, 1872) – Egypt, Israel, Syria
- Crustulina erythropus (Lucas, 1846) – Morocco, Algeria
- Crustulina grayi Chrysanthus, 1975 – New Guinea
- Crustulina guttata (Wider, 1834) (type) – Canary Is., Europe, Caucasus, Russia (Europe to South Siberia), Central Asia, China, Korea, Japan
- Crustulina hermonensis Levy & Amitai, 1979 – Israel
- Crustulina incerta Tullgren, 1910 – Tanzania
- Crustulina jeanneli Berland, 1920 – East Africa
- Crustulina lugubris Chrysanthus, 1975 – New Guinea
- Crustulina molesta (Pavesi, 1883) – Ethiopia
- Crustulina obesa Berland, 1920 – East Africa
- Crustulina scabripes Simon, 1881 – Mediterranean
- Crustulina starmuehlneri Kritscher, 1966 – New Caledonia
- Crustulina sticta (O. Pickard-Cambridge, 1861) – North America, Europe, Turkey, Caucasus, Russia (Europe to Far East), Kazakhstan, Iran, Central Asia, China, Korea, Japan

In synonymy:

- C. argus Lucas, 1846 = Crustulina scabripes Simon, 1881
- C. borealis Banks, 1900 = Crustulina sticta (O. Pickard-Cambridge, 1861)
- C. lineiventris (Pavesi, 1884) = Crustulina scabripes Simon, 1881
- C. nitida Simon, 1884 = Crustulina scabripes Simon, 1881
- C. pallipes Banks, 1906 = Crustulina sticta (O. Pickard-Cambridge, 1861)
- C. rugosa (Thorell, 1875) = Crustulina sticta (O. Pickard-Cambridge, 1861)
