= Platnickina alabamensis =

Scientific classification
- Kingdom: Animalia
- Phylum: Arthropoda
- Subphylum: Chelicerata
- Class: Arachnida
- Order: Araneae
- Infraorder: Araneomorphae
- Family: Theridiidae
- Genus: Platnickina
- Species: P. alabamensis

Binomial name
- Platnickina alabamensis (Gertsch & Archer, 1942)

Species of spider

Platnickina alabamensis is a species of cobweb spider in the family Theridiidae. It is found in the United States and Canada.
