= Crustulina altera =

Scientific classification
- Kingdom: Animalia
- Phylum: Arthropoda
- Subphylum: Chelicerata
- Class: Arachnida
- Order: Araneae
- Infraorder: Araneomorphae
- Family: Theridiidae
- Genus: Crustulina
- Species: C. altera

Binomial name
- Crustulina altera Gertsch & Archer, 1942

Species of spider

Crustulina altera is a species of cobweb spider in the family Theridiidae. It is found in the United States.
