= Epeirotypus =

Scientific classification
- Kingdom: Animalia
- Phylum: Arthropoda
- Subphylum: Chelicerata
- Class: Arachnida
- Order: Araneae
- Infraorder: Araneomorphae
- Family: Theridiosomatidae
- Genus: Epeirotypus; O. Pickard-Cambridge, 1894

Type species
- E. brevipes O. Pickard-Cambridge, 1894

Species
- E. brevipes O. Pickard-Cambridge, 1894 – Mexico to Costa Rica; E. chavarria Coddington, 1986 – Costa Rica; E. dalong Miller, Griswold & Yin, 2009 – China

Genus of spiders

Epeirotypus is a genus of ray spiders that was first described by Octavius Pickard-Cambridge in 1894.

== Description ==
The eye arrangement of spiders in the genus Epeirotypus

Adult Epeirotypus species have a body length of 1–3 mm. The carapace ranges in colour from light yellow to almost black, and the head region is not elevated. The sternum is smooth, convex, and rounded to the rear. The abdomen is ovoid, usually with a dorsal pattern which varies by species and sometimes bearing posterior lateral tubercules. The legs are short and stout, light tan or sometimes dark with annulations. The femoral length is 1/3–1/2 the total width of the carapace, and the tarsi bear an irregular group of serrated hairs on the ventral side.

They have eight eyes, all approximately equal in size. The AME are separated by half their diameter and the PME typically separated by their diameter.

== Species ==
As of June 2020 it contains three species, found in China, Costa Rica, and Mexico: E. brevipes, E. chavarria, and E. dalong.
