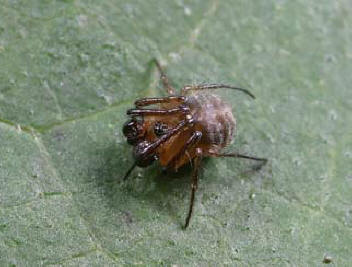
- male
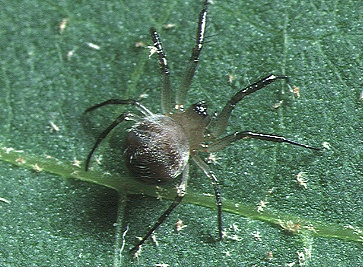
- female

Scientific classification
- Kingdom: Animalia
- Phylum: Arthropoda
- Subphylum: Chelicerata
- Class: Arachnida
- Order: Araneae
- Infraorder: Araneomorphae
- Family: Theridiosomatidae
- Genus: Wendilgarda; Keyserling, 1886

Type species
- W. mexicana Keyserling, 1886

Species
- 13, see text

Synonyms
- Cyathidea Simon, 1907; Enthorodera Simon, 1907

= Wendilgarda =

Genus of spiders

Wendilgarda is a genus of ray spiders that was first described by Eugen von Keyserling in 1886.

== Species ==
As of February 2023 it contains fourteen species and one subspecies, found in Asia, the Caribbean, Central America, São Tomé and Príncipe, Brazil, and Mexico:

- Wendilgarda assamensis Fage, 1924 – India, China
- Wendilgarda atricolor (Simon, 1907) – São Tomé and Príncipe
- Wendilgarda clara Keyserling, 1886 – Caribbean, Guatemala to Brazil
- Wendilgarda galapagensis Archer, 1953 – Costa Rica (Cocos Is.)
- Wendilgarda housaiyuae Lin & Li, 2022 – China
- Wendilgarda liliwensis Barrion & Litsinger, 1995 – Philippines
- Wendilgarda mexicana Keyserling, 1886 (type) – Mexico, Central America, Cuba
- Wendilgarda muji Miller, Griswold & Yin, 2009 – China
- Wendilgarda mustelina Simon, 1898 – St. Vincent
  - Wendilgarda m. arnouxi Lopez & Emerit, 1986 – Guadeloupe
- Wendilgarda nigra Keyserling, 1886 – Brazil
- Wendilgarda nipponica Shinkai, 2009 – Japan
- Wendilgarda panjanensis Barrion, Barrion-Dupo & Heong, 2013 – China
- Wendilgarda ruficeps Suzuki, 2019 – Japan
- Wendilgarda sinensis Zhu & Wang, 1992 – China

Formerly included:

- W. bicolor Keyserling, 1886 (Transferred to Plato)
- W. coddingtoni Zhu, Zhang & Chen, 2001 (Transferred to Karstia)
- W. guacharo Brignoli, 1972 (Transferred to Plato)
- W. miranda Brignoli, 1972 (Transferred to Plato)
