= Parogulnius =

Scientific classification
- Kingdom: Animalia
- Phylum: Arthropoda
- Subphylum: Chelicerata
- Class: Arachnida
- Order: Araneae
- Infraorder: Araneomorphae
- Family: Theridiosomatidae
- Genus: Parogulnius
- Species: P. hypsigaster

Binomial name
- Parogulnius hypsigaster Archer, 1953

Genus of spiders

Parogulnius is a genus of spiders in the family Theridiosomatidae. It was first described in 1953 by Archer. As of 2017, it contains only one species, Parogulnius hypsigaster, found in the United States.
