= Tantra (spider) =

Scientific classification
- Kingdom: Animalia
- Phylum: Arthropoda
- Subphylum: Chelicerata
- Class: Arachnida
- Order: Araneae
- Infraorder: Araneomorphae
- Family: Theridiosomatidae
- Genus: Tantra; Labarque, Piacentini, Pons, Hormiga, Arnedo & Ramirez, 2025

Type species
- T. bugle Labarque, Piacentini, Pons, Hormiga, Arnedo & Ramirez, 2025

Species
- 9, see text

Genus of spiders

Tantra is a genus of spiders in the family Theridiosomatidae.

== Distribution ==
All but one described species of Tantra are endemic to Panama. T. kullki is endemic to Ecuador.

== Etymology ==
The genus is derived from Sanskrit तन्त्र tántra in the meaning "loom, weave". Most species are named after indigenous tribes, Bribri, Buglé, Emberá, Kuna, Naso, Ngäbe, Wounaan. T. sichid is derived from the Kuna word for "black"

== Species ==
As of January 2026, this genus includes nine species:

- Tantra bribri Labarque, Piacentini, Pons, Hormiga, Arnedo & Ramirez, 2025 – Panama
- Tantra bugle Labarque, Piacentini, Pons, Hormiga, Arnedo & Ramirez, 2025 – Panama
- Tantra embera Labarque, Piacentini, Pons, Hormiga, Arnedo & Ramirez, 2025 – Panama
- Tantra kullki (Dupérré & Tapia, 2017) – Ecuador
- Tantra kuna Labarque, Piacentini, Pons, Hormiga, Arnedo & Ramirez, 2025 – Panama
- Tantra naso Labarque, Piacentini, Pons, Hormiga, Arnedo & Ramirez, 2025 – Panama
- Tantra ngabe Labarque, Piacentini, Pons, Hormiga, Arnedo & Ramirez, 2025 – Panama
- Tantra sichid Labarque, Piacentini, Pons, Hormiga, Arnedo & Ramirez, 2025 – Panama
- Tantra wounaan Labarque, Piacentini, Pons, Hormiga, Arnedo & Ramirez, 2025 – Panama
