= Andasta semiargentea =

Scientific classification
- Kingdom: Animalia
- Phylum: Arthropoda
- Subphylum: Chelicerata
- Class: Arachnida
- Order: Araneae
- Infraorder: Araneomorphae
- Family: Theridiosomatidae
- Genus: Andasta
- Species: A. semiargentea

Binomial name
- Andasta semiargentea Simon, 1895

Species of spider

Andasta semiargentea is a species of spider of the genus Andasta. It is endemic to Sri Lanka.
