= Andasta benoiti =

Conservation status
- Vulnerable (IUCN 3.1)

Scientific classification
- Kingdom: Animalia
- Phylum: Arthropoda
- Subphylum: Chelicerata
- Class: Arachnida
- Order: Araneae
- Infraorder: Araneomorphae
- Family: Theridiosomatidae
- Genus: Andasta
- Species: A. benoiti

Binomial name
- Andasta benoiti (Roberts, 1978)

Synonyms
- Theridiosoma benoiti Roberts, 1978

Species of spider

Andasta benoiti is a species of ray spider that is endemic to the Seychelles. It is found on the islands of Mahé, Conception, Thérèse, North, Praslin, Marianne, Felicite and Denis. It is found in coastal woodlands. It is threatened by coastal development and habitat degradation from invasive plants, especially Cinnamomum verum.
