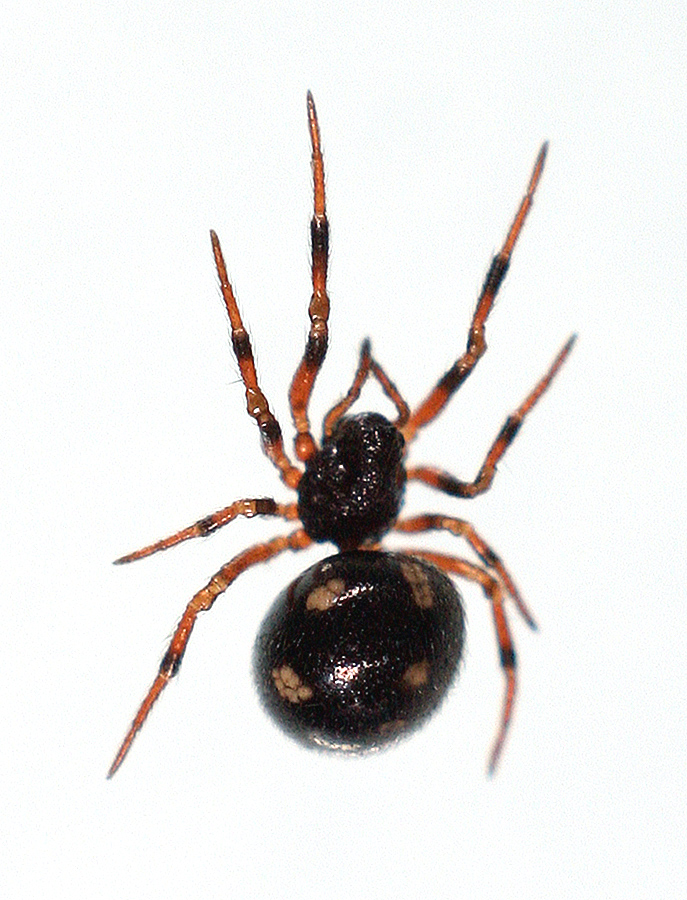

Scientific classification
- Kingdom: Animalia
- Phylum: Arthropoda
- Subphylum: Chelicerata
- Class: Arachnida
- Order: Araneae
- Infraorder: Araneomorphae
- Family: Theridiidae
- Genus: Crustulina
- Species: C. guttata

Binomial name
- Crustulina guttata (Wider, 1834)

Synonyms
- Theridion guttatum Wider, 1834

= Crustulina guttata =

Species of spider

Crustulina guttata is a spider species with Palearctic distribution. It is notably found in Lithuania.

It is the type species of the genus Crustulina.
