= Simonia (spider) =

Scientific classification
- Kingdom: Animalia
- Phylum: Arthropoda
- Subphylum: Chelicerata
- Class: Arachnida
- Order: Araneae
- Infraorder: Araneomorphae
- Family: Theridiosomatidae
- Genus: Simonia; Yu & Lin, 2023, 2023

Type species
- Baalzebub youyiensis Zhao & Li, 2012

Species
- 3, see text

Genus of spiders

Simonia is a genus of spiders in the family Theridiosomatidae.

== Distribution ==
Simonia is found in Southeast Asia and China.

== Species ==
As of January 2026, this genus includes three species:

- Simonia steineri Yu & Lin, 2023 – Laos
- Simonia sumatra Yu & Lin, 2023 – Indonesia (Sumatra)
- Simonia youyiensis (Zhao & Li, 2012) – China, Vietnam, Laos
