= Zoma zoma =

Conservation status
- Critically Endangered (IUCN 3.1)

Scientific classification
- Kingdom: Animalia
- Phylum: Arthropoda
- Subphylum: Chelicerata
- Class: Arachnida
- Order: Araneae
- Infraorder: Araneomorphae
- Family: Theridiosomatidae
- Genus: Zoma
- Species: Z. zoma

Binomial name
- Zoma zoma Saaristo, 1996

Species of spider

Zoma zoma is a species of ray spider (family Theridiosomatidae) that is endemic to Silhouette Island of Seychelles. It was first described by Michael I. Saaristo & A. V. Tanasevitch in 1996. To date Zoma only contains its type species Zoma Zoma. The name of Zoma refers to the belt of silvery corpuscles on the abdomen of the type species. Not much is known about males of the species. Females have a total length, not including chelicerae, of 1.79 mm (.07 inches). It is threatened by habitat degradation from invasive plants, such as Cinnamomum verum.
