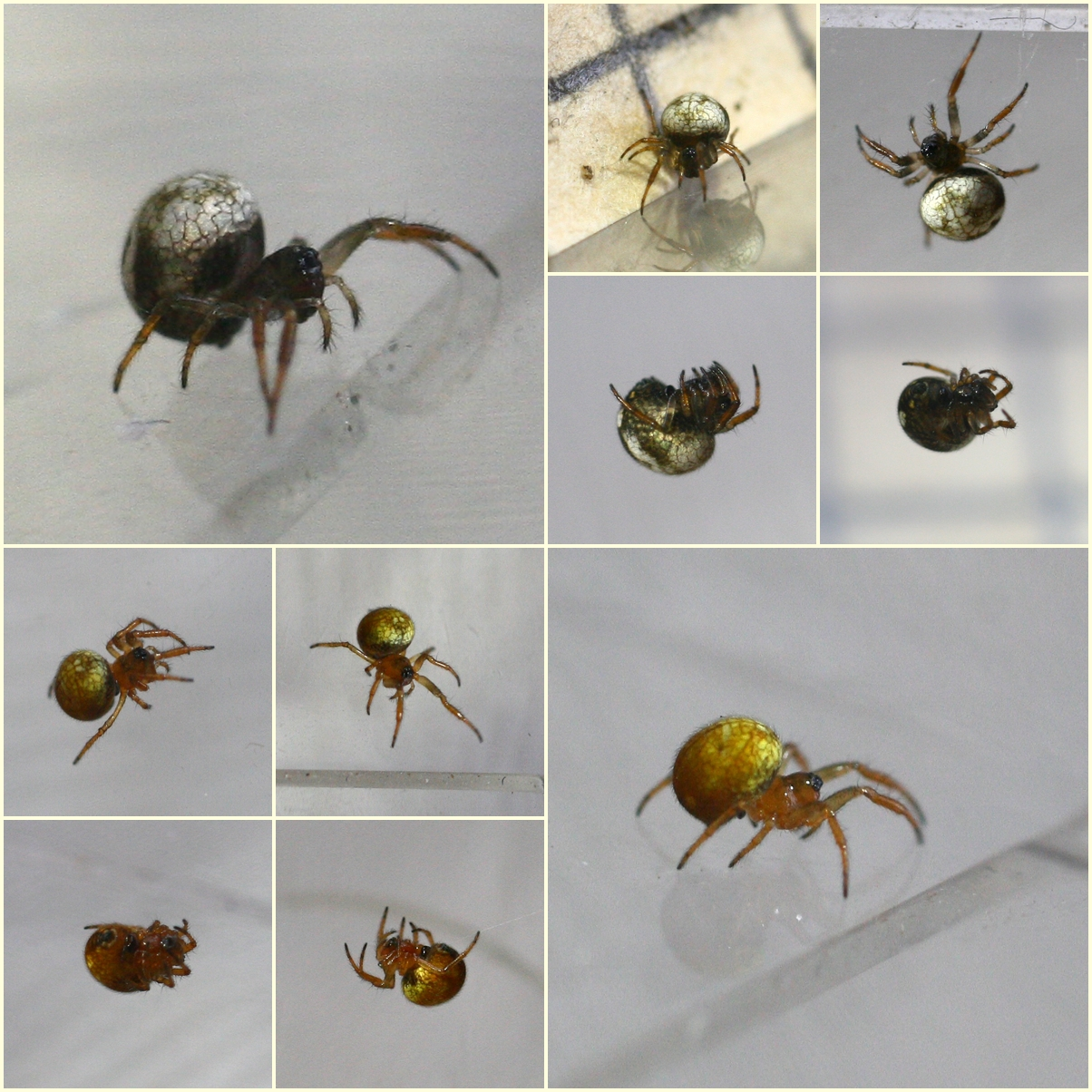

Scientific classification
- Domain: Eukaryota
- Kingdom: Animalia
- Phylum: Arthropoda
- Subphylum: Chelicerata
- Class: Arachnida
- Order: Araneae
- Infraorder: Araneomorphae
- Family: Theridiosomatidae
- Genus: Theridiosoma
- Species: T. gemmosum

Binomial name
- Theridiosoma gemmosum (L. Koch, 1877)

= Theridiosoma gemmosum =

Species of spider

Theridiosoma gemmosum is a species of spider in the family Theridiosomatidae, known as ray spiders. It is widely distributed in the Holarctic region. A small spider with a shiny globular abdomen, it constructs a conical orb web.

== Description ==
Theridiosoma gemmosum is a small spider. Females are 2–3 mm long, males smaller still at 1.5–2 mm. In both sexes, the carapace (upper surface of the cephalothorax) is dark brown; the upper surface of the abdomen (opisthosoma) is silvery with variable dark lines and marks. The abdomen is globular, more or less circular from above. The male palpal bulbs and the female epigyne are distinctive.

== Web ==
Theridiosoma gemmosum constructs a small orb web. The radii do not run directly to a central hub as with other orb webs, but are first joined into groups of two or three before combining to meet in the middle. A single thread runs from the centre to a nearby support, and is held by the spider. While the spider is holding this thread the tension pulls the web into a conical shape, described as "like an umbrella turned inside out". When prey, such as a mosquito gets near the web, the spider releases the web, which snaps forward and catches it. Experiments indicate the spiders are listening for prey, as they will release their webs when approached by an appropriately pitched tuning fork.

== Taxonomy ==
The species was first described by Ludwig Koch in 1877, as Theridium gemmosum. (Theridium is an alternative spelling of Theridion.) Koch did not explain the origin of the species name gemmosum. The Latin word gemmosus means "set with jewels"; Koch several times used the description "Perlmutter", German for "mother of pearl". In 1879, Octavius Pickard-Cambridge described what he considered to be a different although closely related species. He decided that was not a Theridion, and placed it in a new genus, Theridiosoma, as T. argenteolum. Eugène Simon in 1881 recognized that Koch's and Pickard-Cambridge's species were the same and united them under the current name Theridiosoma gemmosum.

== Distribution and habitat ==
Theridiosoma gemmosum has a Holarctic distribution, i.e. it is found throughout the northern and central parts of the Northern Hemisphere. It is described as "rare" in northern Europe, including Great Britain and Ireland. It is usually found in damp habitats, among low-growing vegetation.
