= Theridiosoma genevensium =

Scientific classification
- Kingdom: Animalia
- Phylum: Arthropoda
- Subphylum: Chelicerata
- Class: Arachnida
- Order: Araneae
- Infraorder: Araneomorphae
- Family: Theridiosomatidae
- Genus: Theridiosoma
- Species: T. genevensium

Binomial name
- Theridiosoma genevensium (Brignoli, 1972)

Species of spider

Theridiosoma genevensium, is a species of spider of the genus Theridiosoma. It is endemic to Sri Lanka.
