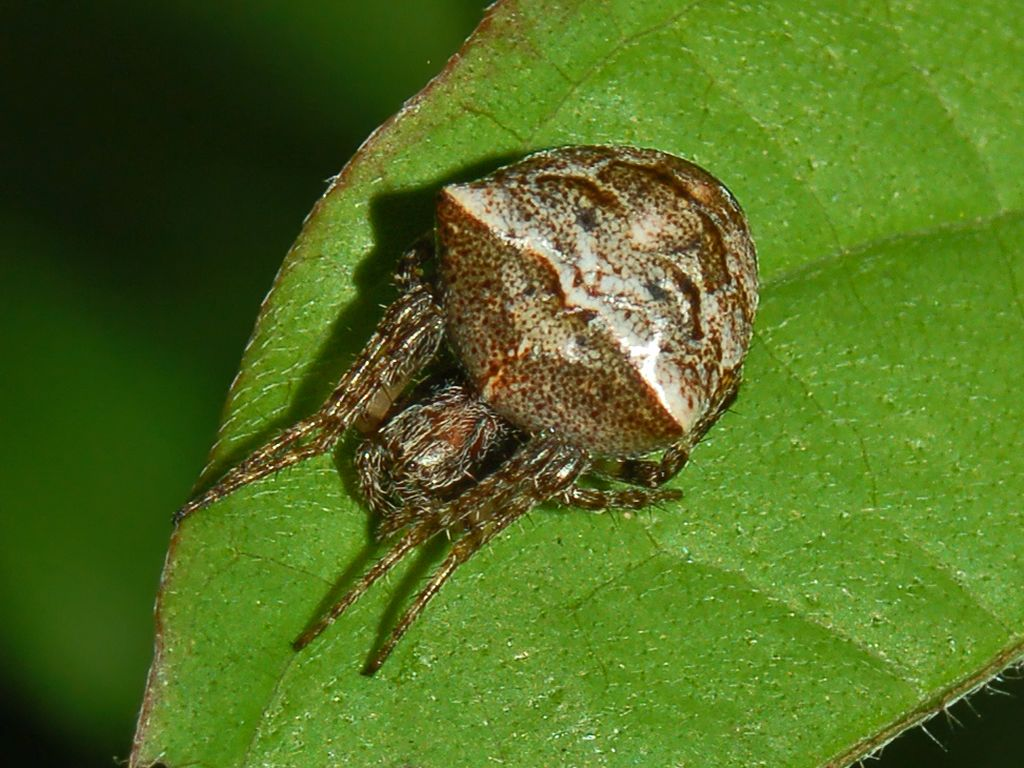

Scientific classification
- Kingdom: Animalia
- Phylum: Arthropoda
- Subphylum: Chelicerata
- Class: Arachnida
- Order: Araneae
- Infraorder: Araneomorphae
- Family: Araneidae
- Genus: Gibbaranea
- Species: G. bituberculata

Binomial name
- Gibbaranea bituberculata (Walckenaer, 1802)

= Gibbaranea bituberculata =

Species of spider

Gibbaranea bituberculata is a species of 'orbweavers' belonging to the family Araneidae, subfamily Araneinae.

This species has a palearctic distribution and is present in most of Europe.

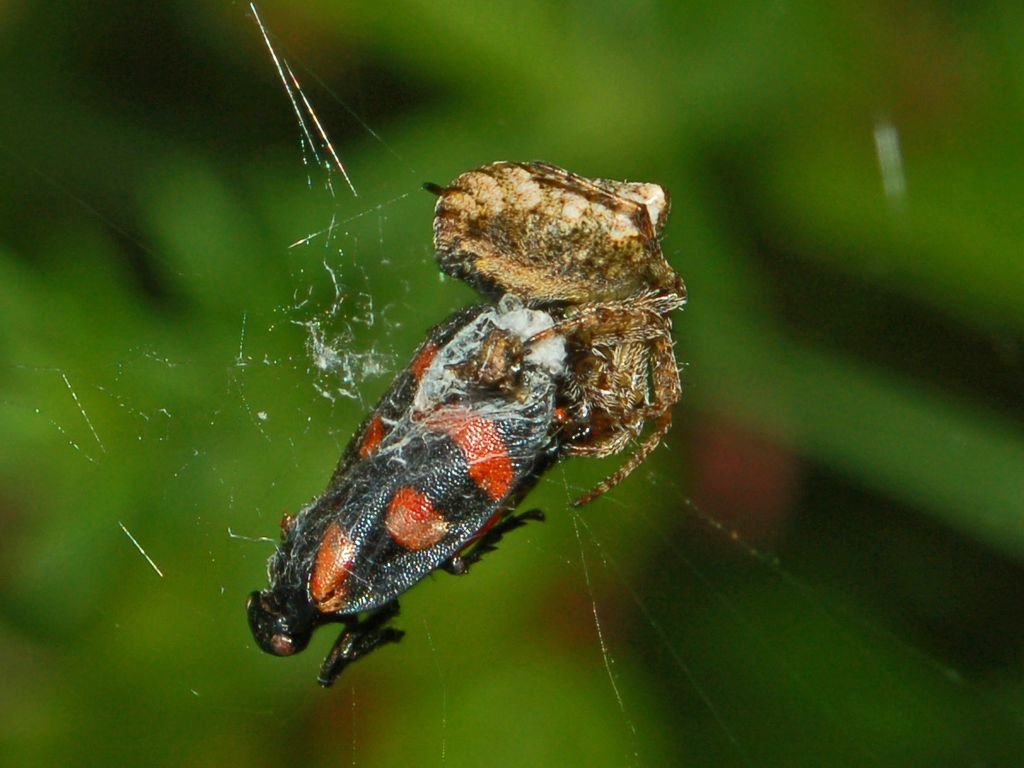
Gibbaranea bituberculata preys a Cercopis species

The adult males of these spiders reach 6–8 millimetres (0.24–0.31 in) of length, while females are 8–10 millimetres (0.31–0.39 in) long. They can be encountered in sunny habitats on shrubs, edges and low plants, where they can make their webs near the ground.

Their basic color is very variable, but usually it is brownish, with whitish shades. The cephalothorax (prosoma) is quite broad, with lying down hair. In the female the abdomen (opisthosoma) is large and spherical, with two small holes. They have eight eyes, with four relatively large eyes in the middle. Chelicerae are short and powerful, with teeth on the inside. The legs are moderately long and quite powerful.

== Subspecies ==
- Gibbaranea bituberculata bituberculata
- Gibbaranea bituberculata cuculligera (Simon, 1909)
- Gibbaranea bituberculata strandiana (Kolosvary, 1936)
