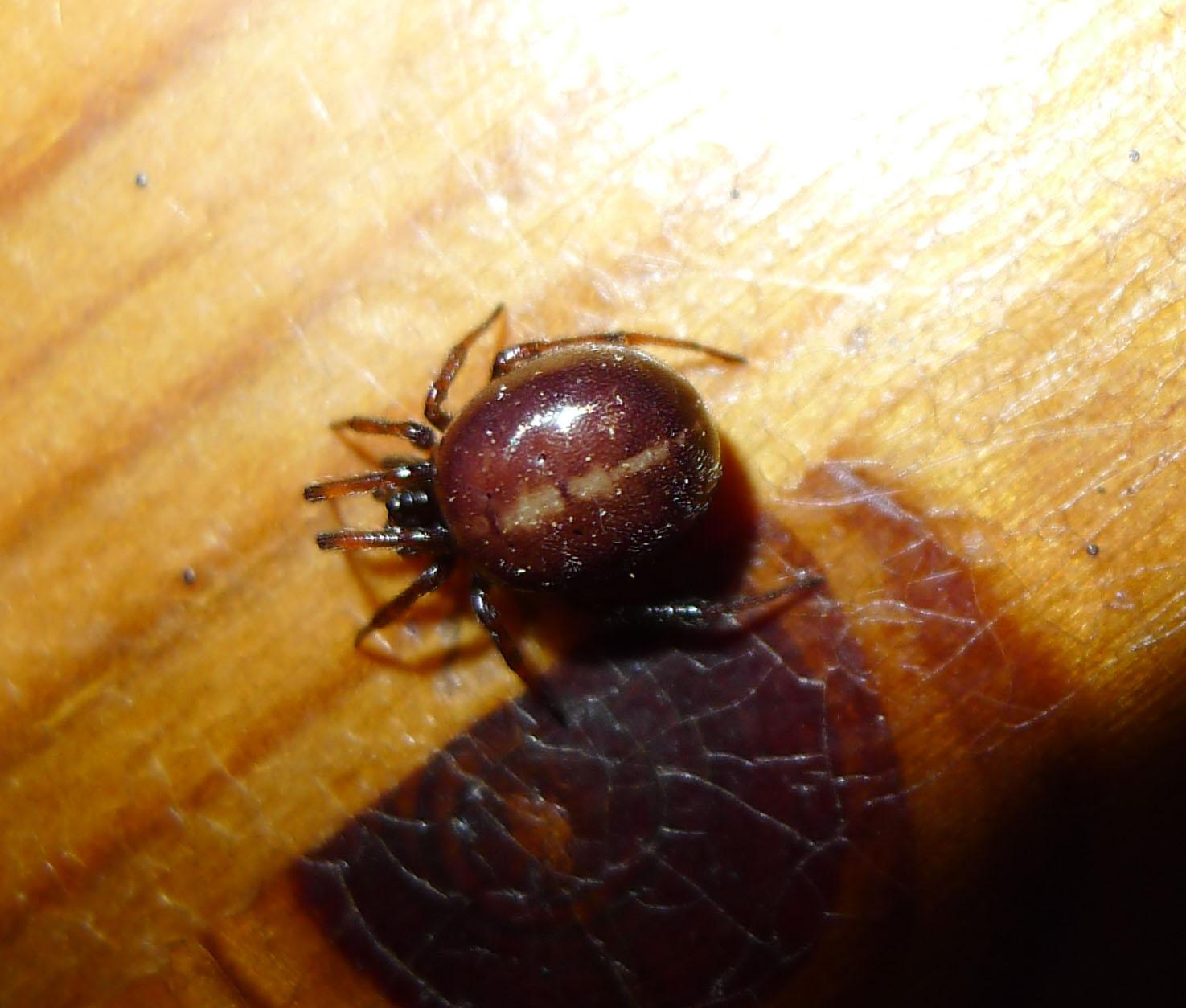

Conservation status
- Secure (NatureServe)

Scientific classification
- Kingdom: Animalia
- Phylum: Arthropoda
- Subphylum: Chelicerata
- Class: Arachnida
- Order: Araneae
- Infraorder: Araneomorphae
- Family: Theridiidae
- Genus: Crustulina
- Species: C. sticta

Binomial name
- Crustulina sticta (O. P.-Cambridge, 1861)

= Crustulina sticta =

Species of spider

Crustulina sticta is a species of cobweb spider in the family Theridiidae. It is found in North America, Europe, Turkey, Caucasus, a range from Russia (European to Siberia), Kazakhstan, China, Korea, and Japan.
