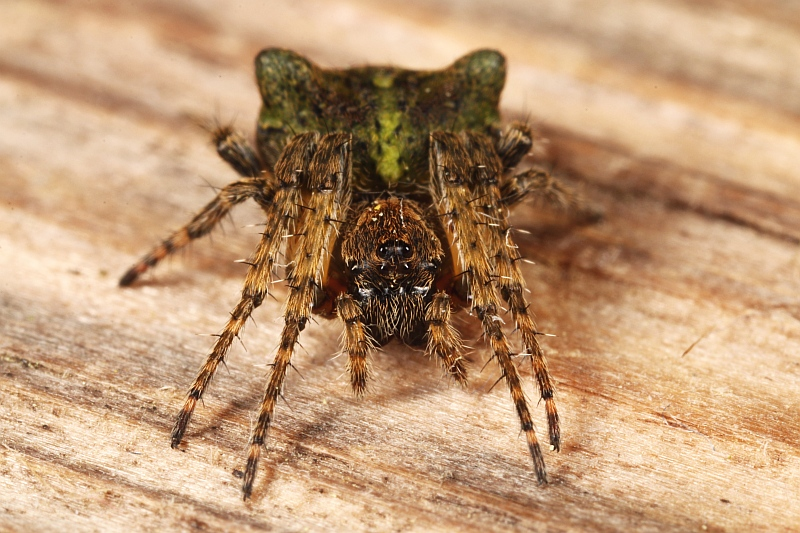

Conservation status
- Least Concern (IUCN 3.1)(Proposed)

Scientific classification
- Domain: Eukaryota
- Kingdom: Animalia
- Phylum: Arthropoda
- Subphylum: Chelicerata
- Class: Arachnida
- Order: Araneae
- Infraorder: Araneomorphae
- Family: Araneidae
- Genus: Gibbaranea
- Species: G. gibbosa

Binomial name
- Gibbaranea gibbosa Walckenaer, 1802

= Gibbaranea gibbosa =

Species of spider

Gibbaranea gibbosa is a species of orb-weaver spider in the genus Gibbaranea.

== Description ==
Females of the species can be up to 7mm long. Both sexes have brown and green markings and tubercles on their abdomens.

== Range ==
It is present throughout Europe, the Caucasus, and parts of the Middle East and North Africa.

== Habitat ==
It can be found on trees and bushes in woodland and hedgerows, and can be difficult to spot hidden amongst the leaves. It favours evergreen shrubs.

== Taxonomy ==
Gibbaranea gibbosa contains the following subspecies:

- Gibbaranea gibbosa gibbosa
- Gibbaranea gibbosa confinis
