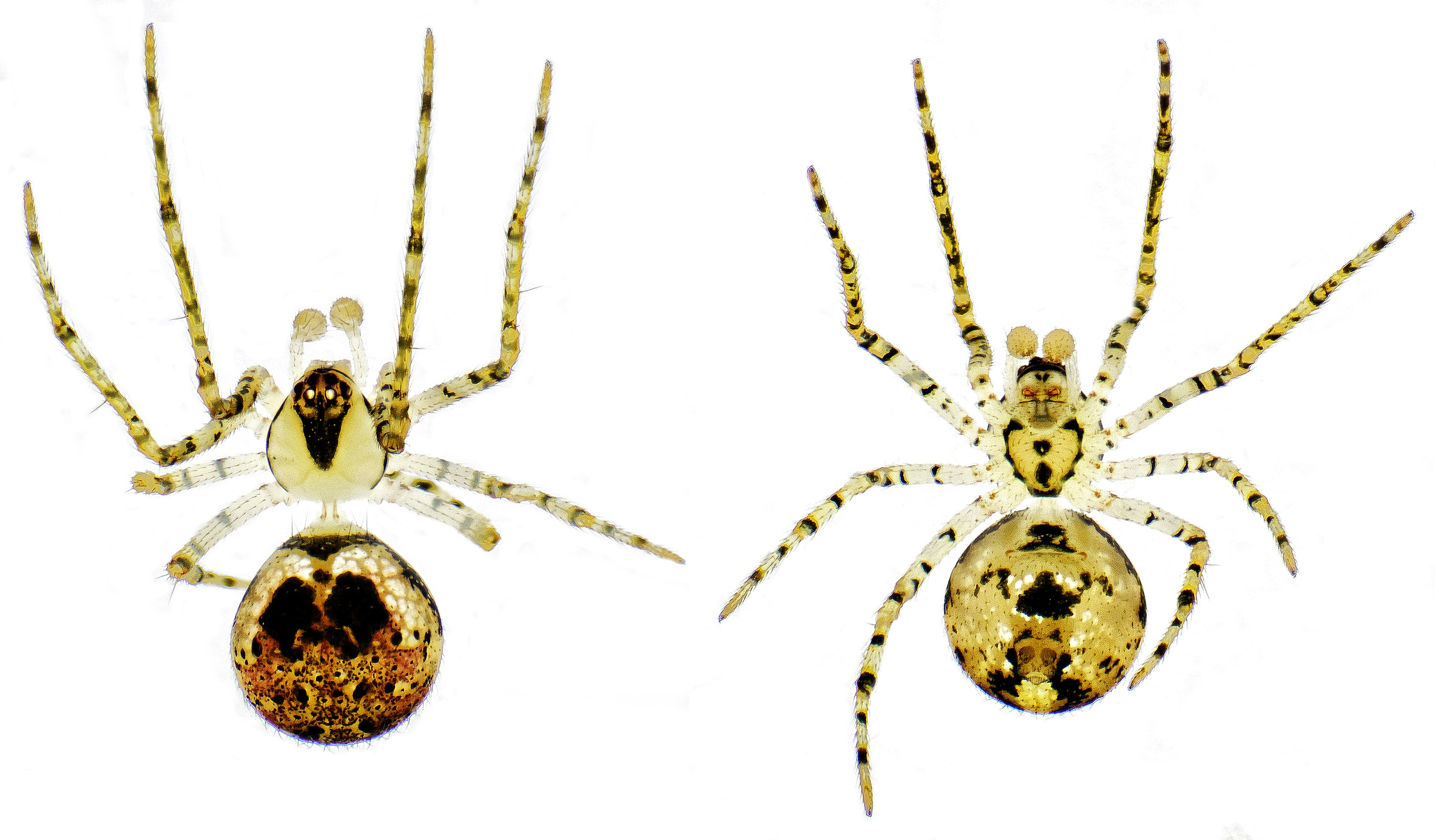
- P. tincta
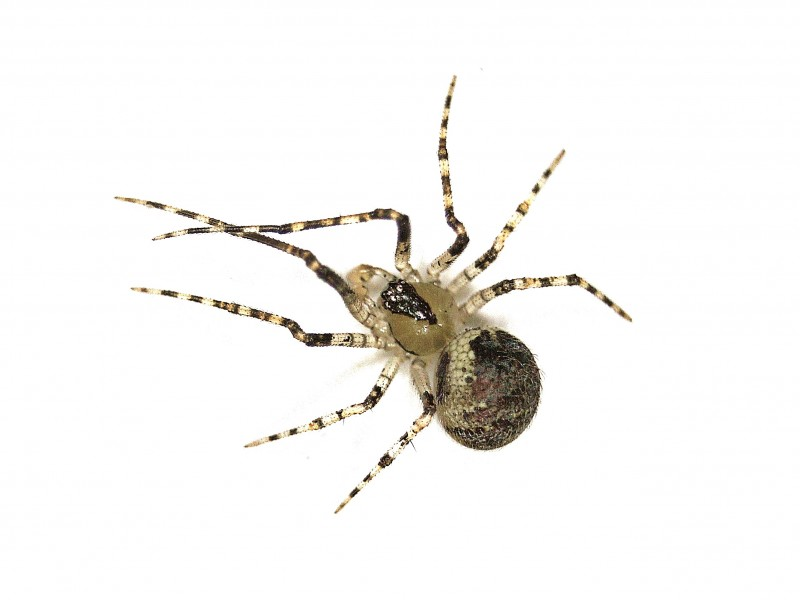

Scientific classification
- Kingdom: Animalia
- Phylum: Arthropoda
- Subphylum: Chelicerata
- Class: Arachnida
- Order: Araneae
- Infraorder: Araneomorphae
- Family: Theridiidae
- Genus: Platnickina
- Species: P. tincta

Binomial name
- Platnickina tincta (Walckenaer, 1802)

Synonyms
- Aranea tincta Walckenaer, 1802; Theridion tinctum — Walckenaer, 1805; Keijia tincta — Yoshida, 2001

= Platnickina tincta =

Species of spider

Platnickina tincta is a tangle web spider species with Holarctic distribution. It is notably found in Lithuania.

It is the type species in the genus Platnickina. The type locality is Paris, France.

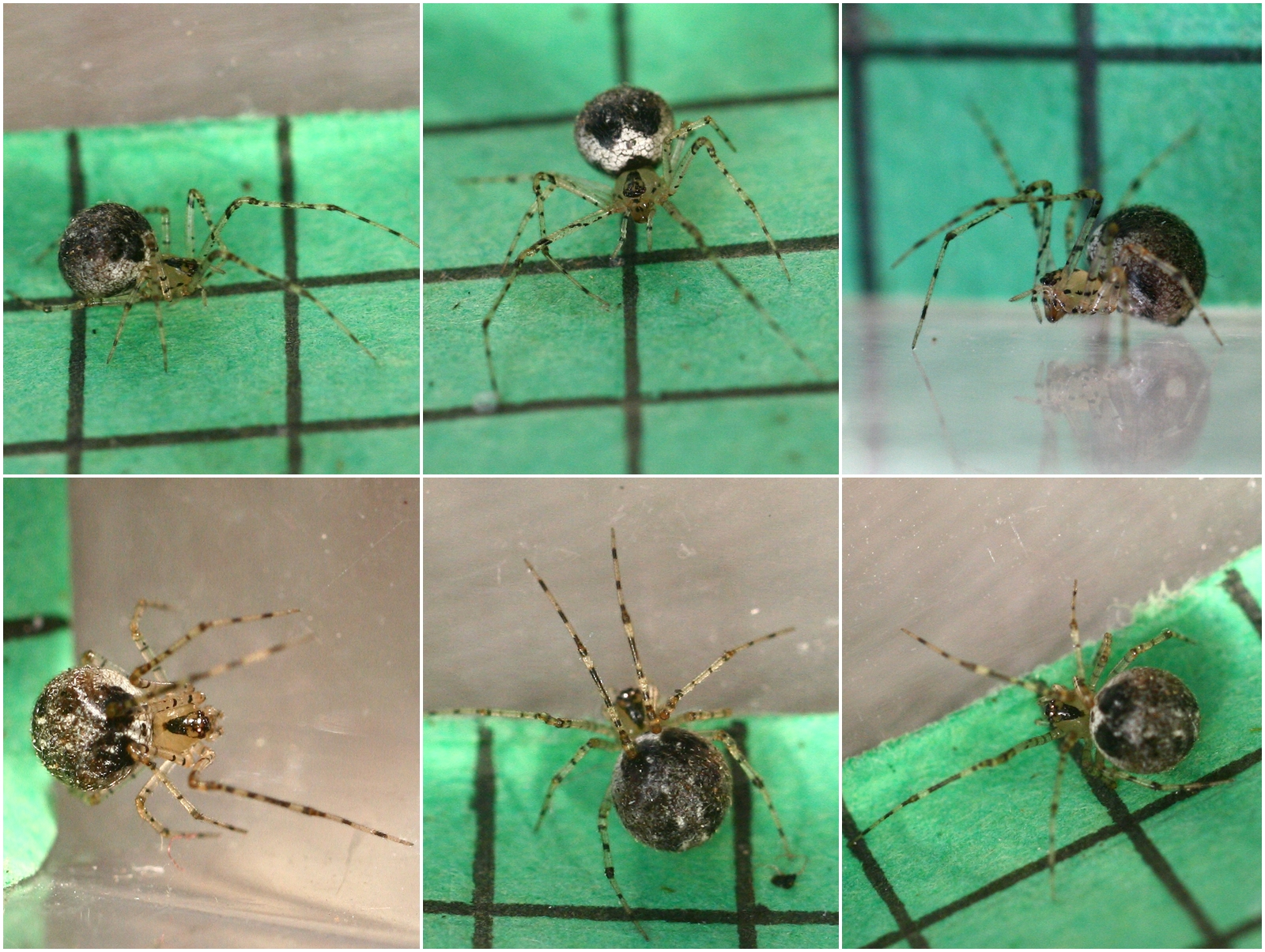
Platnickina tincta, Bricket Wood Common, Hertfordshire, 12 September 2010.
