= Andasta siltte =

Conservation status
- Critically Endangered (IUCN 3.1)

Scientific classification
- Kingdom: Animalia
- Phylum: Arthropoda
- Subphylum: Chelicerata
- Class: Arachnida
- Order: Araneae
- Infraorder: Araneomorphae
- Family: Theridiosomatidae
- Genus: Andasta
- Species: A. siltte

Binomial name
- Andasta siltte Saaristo, 1996

Species of spider

Andasta siltte is a species of ray spider that is endemic to the Seychelles. It is only known from a single specimen from Silhouette Island. It is found in woodlands at the lower edge of cloud forest. It is threatened by habitat deterioration, from invasive plants (especially Cinnamomum verum) and climate change.
