= Epilineutes =

Scientific classification
- Kingdom: Animalia
- Phylum: Arthropoda
- Subphylum: Chelicerata
- Class: Arachnida
- Order: Araneae
- Infraorder: Araneomorphae
- Family: Theridiosomatidae
- Genus: Epilineutes; Coddington, 1986
- Species: E. globosus

Binomial name
- Epilineutes globosus (O. Pickard-Cambridge, 1896)

Monotypic genus of spiders

Epilineutes is a monotypic genus of South and Central American ray spiders containing the single species, Epilineutes globosus. The genus was first described by Jonathan A. Coddington in 1986. The single species was first described in 1896 under the name Andasta globosa, but has also been referred to as Theridiosoma globosum.

It has been found in Brazil and Mexico.
