= Otxuruu =

Scientific classification
- Kingdom: Animalia
- Phylum: Arthropoda
- Subphylum: Chelicerata
- Class: Arachnida
- Order: Araneae
- Infraorder: Araneomorphae
- Family: Theridiosomatidae
- Genus: Otxuruu; Pantoja, Bonaldo, Brescovit & Labarque, 2025
- Species: O. fallax

Binomial name
- Otxuruu fallax Pantoja, Bonaldo, Brescovit & Labarque, 2025

Species of spider

Otxuruu is a monotypic genus of spiders in the family Theridiosomatidae containing the single species, Otxuruu fallax.

== Distribution ==
Otxuruu fallax has been recorded from Ecuador and Brazil.
