= Chthonos =

Scientific classification
- Kingdom: Animalia
- Phylum: Arthropoda
- Subphylum: Chelicerata
- Class: Arachnida
- Order: Araneae
- Infraorder: Araneomorphae
- Family: Theridiosomatidae
- Genus: Chthonos; Coddington, 1986

Type species
- C. pectorosa (O. Pickard-Cambridge, 1882)

Species
- 5, see text

Genus of spiders

Chthonos is a genus of South American ray spiders that was created by Jonathan A. Coddington in 1986 because the previous name was preoccupied. Originally placed with the Orb-weaver_spiders under the name Tecmessa, it was transferred to the ray spiders in 1986.

== Species ==
As of June 2020 it contains five species, found in Peru, Brazil, and Ecuador:

- Chthonos kuyllur Dupérré & Tapia, 2017 – Ecuador
- Chthonos pectorosa (O. Pickard-Cambridge, 1882) (type) – Brazil
- Chthonos peruana (Keyserling, 1886) – Peru
- Chthonos quinquemucronata (Simon, 1893) – Brazil
- Chthonos tuberosa (Keyserling, 1886) – Brazil

Formerly included:

- C. tetrabuna (Archer, 1965) (Transferred to Ogulnius)
