= Cuacuba =

Scientific classification
- Domain: Eukaryota
- Kingdom: Animalia
- Phylum: Arthropoda
- Subphylum: Chelicerata
- Class: Arachnida
- Order: Araneae
- Infraorder: Araneomorphae
- Family: Theridiosomatidae
- Genus: Cuacuba; Prete, Cizauskas & Brescovit, 2018

Type species
- C. mariana Prete, Cizauskas & Brescovit, 2018

Species
- C. mariana Prete, Cizauskas & Brescovit, 2018 — Brazil; C. morrodopilar Prete, Cizauskas & Brescovit, 2018 — Brazil

Genus of spiders

Cuacuba is a genus of Brazilian ray spiders first described by P. H. Prete, I. Cizauskas & Antônio Domingos Brescovit in 2018. As of April 2019 it contains only two species.
