= Zoma (spider) =

Scientific classification
- Kingdom: Animalia
- Phylum: Arthropoda
- Subphylum: Chelicerata
- Class: Arachnida
- Order: Araneae
- Infraorder: Araneomorphae
- Family: Theridiosomatidae
- Genus: Zoma; Saaristo, 1996

Type species
- Z. zoma Saaristo, 1996

Species
- Z. dibaiyin Miller, Griswold & Yin, 2009 – China, Japan; Z. fascia Zhao & Li, 2012 – China; Z. zoma Saaristo, 1996 – Seychelles

Genus of spiders

Zoma is a genus of ray spiders that was first described by Michael I. Saaristo in 1996. As of June 2020 it contains three species, found in Japan, China, and on the Seychelles: Z. dibaiyin, Z. fascia, and Z. zoma.
