= Sinoalaria =

Scientific classification
- Domain: Eukaryota
- Kingdom: Animalia
- Phylum: Arthropoda
- Subphylum: Chelicerata
- Class: Arachnida
- Order: Araneae
- Infraorder: Araneomorphae
- Family: Theridiosomatidae
- Genus: Sinoalaria; Li

Type species
- Sinoalaria chengguanensis

Species
- Sinoalaria bicornis (Lin, Li & Jäger, 2014); Sinoalaria cavernicola (Lin, Li & Jäger, 2014); Sinoalaria chengguanensis (Zhao & Li, 2012); Sinoalaria navicularis (Lin, Li & Jäger, 2014)

Genus of spiders

Sinoalaria is a genus of spiders in the family Theridiosomatidae. It was first described in 2014 by Zhao & Li. As of 2017, it contains 4 species from Laos and China.
