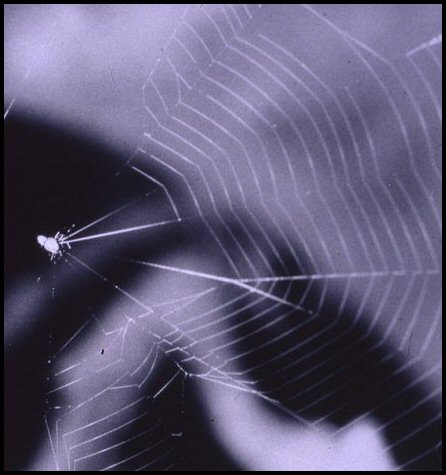

Scientific classification
- Kingdom: Animalia
- Phylum: Arthropoda
- Subphylum: Chelicerata
- Class: Arachnida
- Order: Araneae
- Infraorder: Araneomorphae
- Family: Theridiosomatidae
- Genus: Naatlo; Coddington, 1986

Type species
- N. sutila Coddington, 1986

Species
- 7, see text

= Naatlo =

Genus of spiders

Naatlo is a genus of ray spiders that was first described by Jonathan A. Coddington in 1986.

== Behaviour ==
They use their web as a high speed slingshot to actively hunt for prey. Spiders in the genus have been observed to slingshot themselves at speeds exceeding 1.0m/s with accelerations exceeding 250m/s^{2}.

== Species ==
As of June 2020 it contains seven species, found in South America, Panama, Costa Rica, on Tobago, and Trinidad:

- Naatlo fauna (Simon, 1897) – Costa Rica, Panama, Colombia, Venezuela, Trinidad and Tobago, Ecuador, Peru, Brazil
- Naatlo maturaca Rodrigues & Lise, 2008 – Brazil
- Naatlo mayzana Dupérré & Tapia, 2017 – Ecuador
- Naatlo serrana Rodrigues & Lise, 2008 – Brazil
- Naatlo splendida (Taczanowski, 1874) – Panama, Colombia, Venezuela, French Guiana, Ecuador, Peru, Bolivia, Brazil. [note, date wrong in several works as 1879]
- Naatlo sutila Coddington, 1986 (type) – Panama, Colombia, Venezuela, Trinidad and Tobago, Suriname, Peru, Brazil, Argentina
- Naatlo sylvicola (Hingston, 1932) – Venezuela, Trinidad and Tobago, Guyana
