= Chthonopes =

Scientific classification
- Kingdom: Animalia
- Phylum: Arthropoda
- Subphylum: Chelicerata
- Class: Arachnida
- Order: Araneae
- Infraorder: Araneomorphae
- Family: Theridiosomatidae
- Genus: Chthonopes; Wunderlich, 2011

Type species
- C. jaegeri Wunderlich, 2011

Species
- C. cavernicola Wunderlich, 2011 – Laos; C. jaegeri Wunderlich, 2011 – Laos; C. thakekensis Lin, Li & Jäger, 2014 – Laos

Genus of spiders

Chthonopes is a genus of southeast Asian ray spiders that was first described by J. Wunderlich in 2011. As of June 2020 it contains three species, found in caves of Laos, but can likely also be found in India and China: C. cavernicola, C. jaegeri, and C. thakekensis. They have several adaptations for darker environments, including pale coloration, long legs, and reduced lenses.
