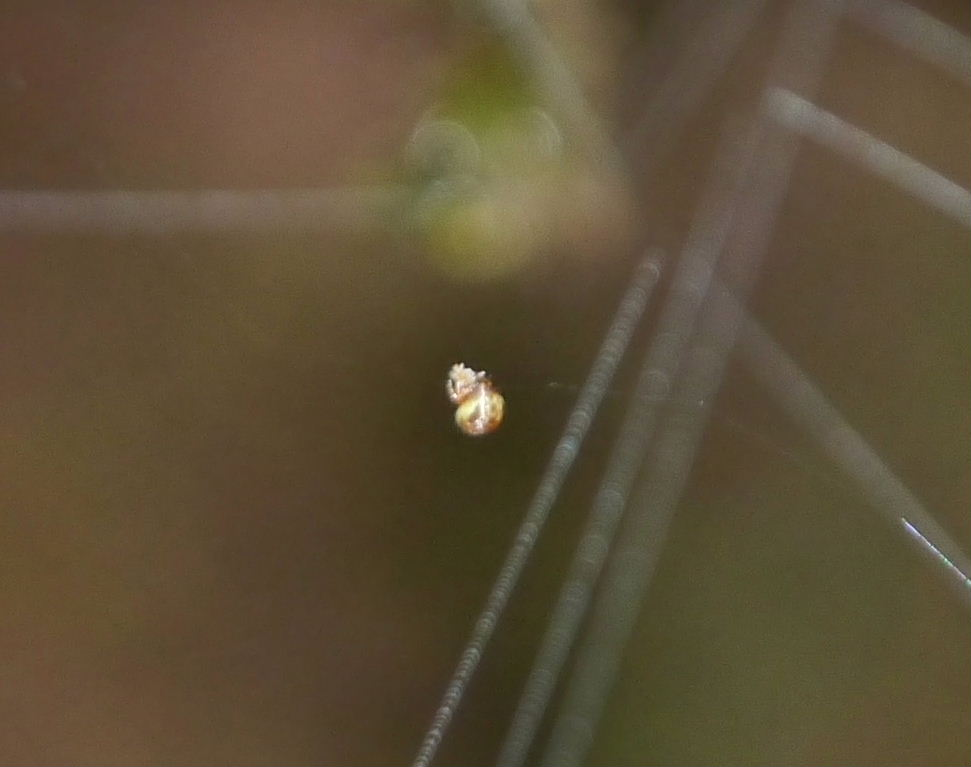
- O. pullus

Scientific classification
- Kingdom: Animalia
- Phylum: Arthropoda
- Subphylum: Chelicerata
- Class: Arachnida
- Order: Araneae
- Infraorder: Araneomorphae
- Family: Theridiosomatidae
- Genus: Ogulnius; O. Pickard-Cambridge, 1882

Type species
- O. obtectus O. Pickard-Cambridge, 1882

Species
- 18, see text

= Ogulnius =

Genus of spiders

Ogulnius is a genus of ray spiders that was first described by Octavius Pickard-Cambridge in 1882.

== Species ==
As of June 2020 it contains eighteen species, found in the Caribbean, South America, Asia, and Panama:

- Ogulnius barbandrewsi Miller, Griswold & Yin, 2009 – China
- Ogulnius clarus Keyserling, 1886 – Brazil
- Ogulnius cubanus Archer, 1958 – Cuba
- Ogulnius fulvus Bryant, 1945 – Hispaniola
- Ogulnius gertschi Archer, 1953 – Panama
- Ogulnius gloriae (Petrunkevitch, 1930) – Puerto Rico
- Ogulnius hapalus Zhao & Li, 2012 – China
- Ogulnius hayoti Lopez, 1994 – Martinique
- Ogulnius infumatus Simon, 1898 – St. Vincent
- Ogulnius laranka Dupérré & Tapia, 2017 – Ecuador
- Ogulnius latus Bryant, 1948 – Hispaniola
- Ogulnius obscurus Keyserling, 1886 – Peru, Brazil
- Ogulnius obtectus O. Pickard-Cambridge, 1882 (type) – Brazil, Colombia, Peru
- Ogulnius paku Dupérré & Tapia, 2017 – Ecuador
- Ogulnius pallisteri Archer, 1953 – Peru
- Ogulnius pullus Bösenberg & Strand, 1906 – Korea, Japan
- Ogulnius tetrabunus (Archer, 1965) – Jamaica
- Ogulnius yaginumai Brignoli, 1981 – Philippines

In synonymy:

- O. agnoscus Strand, 1918 = Ogulnius pullus Bösenberg & Strand, 1906
