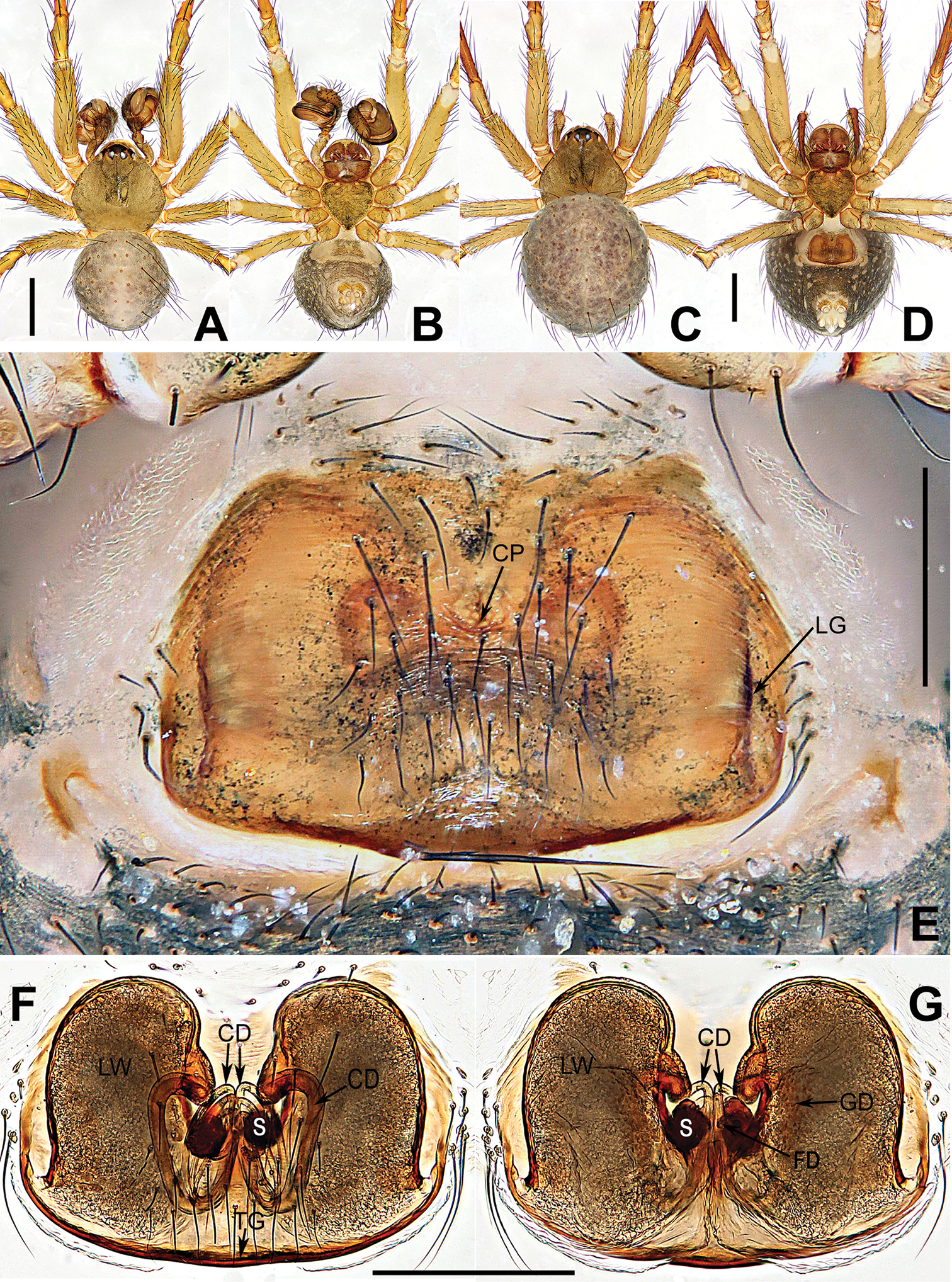

Scientific classification
- Kingdom: Animalia
- Phylum: Arthropoda
- Subphylum: Chelicerata
- Class: Arachnida
- Order: Araneae
- Infraorder: Araneomorphae
- Family: Theridiosomatidae
- Genus: Coddingtonia; Miller, Griswold & Yin, 2009

Type species
- C. euryopoides Miller, Griswold & Yin, 2009

Species
- 6, see text

Synonyms
- Luangnam Wunderlich, 2011

= Coddingtonia =

Genus of spiders

Coddingtonia is a genus of Asian ray spiders that was first described by J. A. Miller, C. E. Griswold, & C. M. Yin in 2009. It is a senior synonym of Luangnam.

== Species ==
As of June 2020 it contains six species, all found in Asia:

- Coddingtonia anaktakun Labarque & Griswold, 2014 – Malaysia
- Coddingtonia discobulbus (Wunderlich, 2011) – Laos
- Coddingtonia erhuan Feng & Lin, 2019 – China
- Coddingtonia euryopoides Miller, Griswold & Yin, 2009 (type) – China
- Coddingtonia huifengi Feng & Lin, 2019 – Indonesia (Sumatra)
- Coddingtonia lizu Feng & Lin, 2019 – China (Hainan)
