= Tagalogonia =

Scientific classification
- Kingdom: Animalia
- Phylum: Arthropoda
- Subphylum: Chelicerata
- Class: Arachnida
- Order: Araneae
- Infraorder: Araneomorphae
- Family: Theridiosomatidae
- Genus: Tagalogonia; Griswold

Type species
- Tagalogonia banahaw

Species
- Tagalogonia banahaw Labarque & Griswold, 2014; Tagalogonia isarog Labarque & Griswold, 2014

Genus of spiders

Tagalogonia is a genus of spiders in the family Theridiosomatidae. It was first described in 2014 by Labarque & Griswold. As of 2017, it contains 2 species from the Philippines.
