= Menglunia =

Scientific classification
- Kingdom: Animalia
- Phylum: Arthropoda
- Subphylum: Chelicerata
- Class: Arachnida
- Order: Araneae
- Infraorder: Araneomorphae
- Family: Theridiosomatidae
- Genus: Menglunia; Zhao & Li, 2012
- Species: M. inaffecta

Binomial name
- Menglunia inaffecta Zhao & Li, 2012

Monotypic genus of spiders

Menglunia is a monotypic genus of Asian ray spiders containing the single species, Menglunia inaffecta. It was first described by Q. Y. Zhao & S. Q. Li in 2012, and is found in China.
