= Andasta =

Scientific classification
- Kingdom: Animalia
- Phylum: Arthropoda
- Subphylum: Chelicerata
- Class: Arachnida
- Order: Araneae
- Infraorder: Araneomorphae
- Family: Theridiosomatidae
- Genus: Andasta; Simon, 1895

Type species
- A. semiargentea Simon, 1895

Species
- 4, see text

Genus of spiders

Andasta is a genus of ray spiders that was first described by Eugène Louis Simon in 1895.

== Species ==
As of June 2020 it contains four species, found in Asia and on the Seychelles:

- Andasta benoiti (Roberts, 1978) – Seychelles
- Andasta cyclosina Simon, 1901 – Malaysia
- Andasta semiargentea Simon, 1895 (type) – Sri Lanka
- Andasta siltte Saaristo, 1996 – Seychelles (Silhouette Island)
