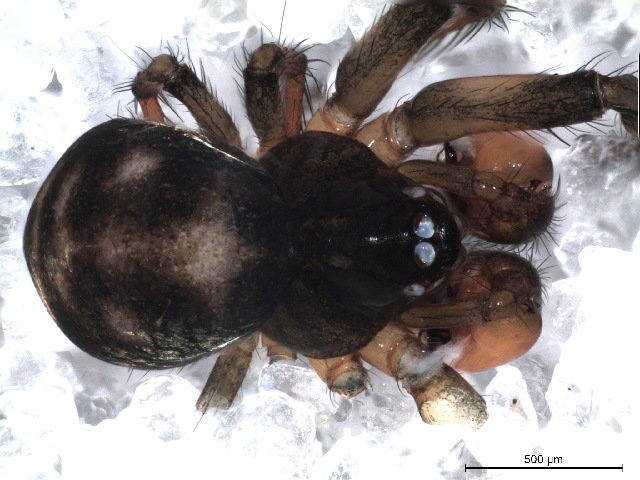
- Baalzebub

Scientific classification
- Kingdom: Animalia
- Phylum: Arthropoda
- Subphylum: Chelicerata
- Class: Arachnida
- Order: Araneae
- Infraorder: Araneomorphae
- Family: Theridiosomatidae
- Genus: Baalzebub; Coddington 1986

Type species
- B. baubo Coddington, 1986

Species
- see text

= Baalzebub (spider) =

Baalzebub Temporal range: Recent

Genus of spiders

Baalzebub is a genus of ray spiders first described by Jonathan A. Coddington in 1986. Spiders in this genus typically live in dark environments, like caves.

== Species ==
As of March 2020 it contains seven extant and one fossil species:

- B. acutum Prete, Cizauskas & Brescovit, 2016 — Brazil
- B. albonotatus (Petrunkevitch, 1930) — Puerto Rico
- B. baubo Coddington, 1986 — Costa Rica, Panama, Brazil
- B. brauni (Wunderlich, 1976) — Australia (Queensland)
- B. nemesis Miller, Griswold & Yin, 2009 — China
- B. rastrarius Zhao & Li, 2012 — China
- B. youyiensis Zhao & Li, 2012 — China
- ?†B. mesozoicum Penney 2014 - Vendée amber, France, Turonian later considered to be stem-Theridiosomatidae
