= Karstia =

Scientific classification
- Kingdom: Animalia
- Phylum: Arthropoda
- Subphylum: Chelicerata
- Class: Arachnida
- Order: Araneae
- Infraorder: Araneomorphae
- Family: Theridiosomatidae
- Genus: Karstia; Chen, 2010

Type species
- K. upperyangtzica Chen, 2010

Species
- 5, see text

Genus of spiders

Karstia is a genus of Asian ray spiders that was first described by H. M. Chen in 2010.

== Species ==
As of June 2020 it contains five species, found in China:

- Karstia coddingtoni (Zhu, Zhang & Chen, 2001) – China
- Karstia cordata Dou & Lin, 2012 – China
- Karstia nitida Zhao & Li, 2012 – China
- Karstia prolata Zhao & Li, 2012 – China
- Karstia upperyangtzica Chen, 2010 (type) – China
