= Jonathan A. Coddington =

American museum scientist and biologist

Jonathan A. Coddington is an American museum scientist and biologist. From 2009 to 2014, he was the Associate Director for Science at the Smithsonian National Museum of Natural History (NMNH), located in Washington, D.C., United States. As of 2015, he is the Director of the Global Genome Initiative and Senior Scientist and Curator of Arachnids and Myriapods at the NMNH.

His research interests include the systematics and evolution of spiders, systematic theory and methods more generally, the theory and design of biological inventories, and biodiversity genomics. Most of his publications up to 2015 are concerned with spiders; 19 are listed in the bibliography section of the World Spider Catalog.
