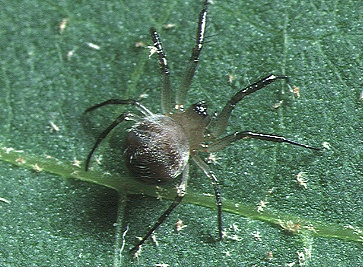
- female Wendilgarda sp.
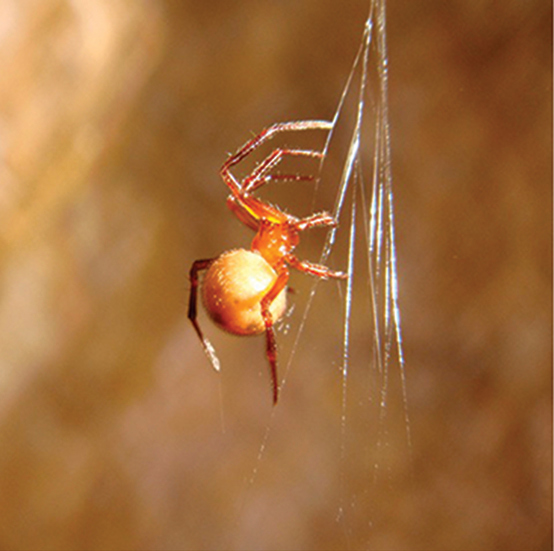
- female Plato ferriferus

Scientific classification
- Kingdom: Animalia
- Phylum: Arthropoda
- Subphylum: Chelicerata
- Class: Arachnida
- Order: Araneae
- Infraorder: Araneomorphae
- Family: Theridiosomatidae; Simon, 1881

Diversity
- 24 genera, 180 species
- blue: reported countries (WSC) green: observation hotspots (iNaturalist)

= Ray spider =

Ray spiders Temporal range: Turonian–present

Family of spiders

Ray spiders are araneomorph spiders in the family Theridiosomatidae, and were first described by Eugène Simon in 1881. The family includes more almost 200 described species divided between 24 genera.

Ray spiders are small arachnids, usually less than 3 mm in body length, best known for their distinctive cone-shaped webs and their remarkable hunting technique of using their webs as high-speed slingshots to capture prey.

== Etymology ==
The family name Theridiosomatidae is derived from the type genus Theridiosoma, which was established by Octavius Pickard-Cambridge in 1879.

== Distribution ==
Ray spiders are chiefly cosmotropical in distribution. Around half the genera are restricted to the Neotropics, while most other genera occur in the Old World Tropics. A few genera are present in both.

Few species reach the cold temperate regions (T. gemmosum in Europe and North America, T. epeiroides in Korea and Japan). Theridiosomatids are apparently absent from western North America. The monotypic genus Parogulnius may be misplaced in this family.

== Habitat ==
Theridiosomatids live almost exclusively in wet or humid, shaded forest habitats. Plato is troglophilic, and Theridiosoma also is common around cave entrances. All species seem to prefer dark situations. Webs typically occur near ground in low vegetation or leaf litter.

== Description ==
Ray spiders are small ecribellate, colulate, entelegyne spiders of the superfamily Araneoidea. Total length ranges from 0.5 to 3.0 mm, usually less than 2.5 mm.

The spiders have eight subequal eyes arranged in two rows, with laterals juxtaposed. The clypeus height is variable, usually more than half an anterior median eye diameter. The carapace is glabrous or with few scattered bristles, pear-shaped, with length and width subequal. The cephalic region is frequently elevated.

The chelicerae are robust with no known stridulatory surfaces and show a wide range in tooth size, from tiny denticles in the fang furrow to larger, often bicuspid teeth irregularly distributed. The labium is wider than long with the sternal suture usually distinct. The sternum is about as long as wide, smooth or papillate, and sparsely bristled.

Legs are arranged in order of length 1-2-4-3 (4-1-2-3 in Ogulnius), of variable proportions. They are short and thick in Epeirotypus, Naatlo, and Ogulnius, longer and more slender in Plato, Epilineutes, and Wendilgarda, and intermediate in Theridiosoma and Baalzebub. The third and fourth tibiae bear trichobothria in 3 or 4 rows that are much longer than the tibial diameter. The median claw is prolonged beyond the lateral claw tips, attenuate, and recurved at the tip. Female pedipalps lack a claw.

The opisthosoma is smoothly ovoid or with variously placed tubercles, sparsely bristled, usually soft, without scuta, and usually higher than long or wide. It is attached near its middle to the cephalothorax and overhangs it to a greater or lesser extent. Coloration is uniform or with transverse silvery or white bands, or mottled blotches sometimes merging to chevrons posteriorly.

An important diagnostic feature is the presence of pit organs on the prolateral margins of the sternum in both sexes (absent only in Chthonos). The male palp shows a distinctive conformation of the bulb and route of the sperm duct reservoir, and females have connate (fused) spermathecae.

== Labiosternal glands ==
The cephalothorax of Theridiosomatidae includes one pair of labiosternal glands which seems a characteristic of the family and could be considered as a variation of segmental glands opening on the base of prosomatic appendages in various spiders.

This organ is composed of a cuticular sack-like reservoir opening on the sternum via a "pit", and of a cluster of functional units belonging to the class 3 of arthropodian epidermal glands. Each unit includes a large adenocyte provided with characteristic foliaceous microvilli (heart-shaped in Naatlo) and numerous mitochondria, an excretory duct terminating to a pore (located on an "apophysis" in Wendilgarda) and canal cells.

Present in immature and both sexes, the labiosternal gland elaborates a golgian semiochemical, either a pheromone for intraspecific communication, or an allomone improving the prey capture. Labiosternal glands were discovered and named by André Lopez(1985,1988,1993).

== Genera ==
As of January 2026, this family includes 24 genera and 180 species:

- Andasta Simon, 1895 – Seychelles, Malaysia, Sri Lanka
- Baalzebub Coddington, 1986 – Central America, Brazil, Australia, China
- Bharatasoma Marusik, 2023 – India
- Chthonopes Wunderlich, 2011 – Laos
- Chthonos Coddington, 1986 – Ecuador, Brazil, Peru
- Coddingtonia Miller, Griswold & Yin, 2009 – Malaysia, Laos
- Cuacuba Prete, Cizauskas & Brescovit, 2018 – Brazil
- Epeirotypus O. Pickard-Cambridge, 1894 – Mexico, Costa Rica
- Epilineutes Coddington, 1986 – Mexico, Brazil
- Karstia Chen, 2010 – China
- Menglunia Zhao & Li, 2012 – China
- Naatlo Coddington, 1986 – Central America, South America, Trinidad and Tobago
- Ogulnius O. Pickard-Cambridge, 1882 – South America, Caribbean, Panama, Asia
- Otxuruu Pantoja, Bonaldo, Brescovit & Labarque, 2025 – Brazil, Ecuador
- Parogulnius Archer, 1953 – United States
- Plato Coddington, 1986 – South America, Trinidad
- Sennin Suzuki, Hiramatsu & Tatsuta, 2022 – Japan
- Simonia Yu & Lin, 2023 – Laos, Indonesia, China, Vietnam
- Sinoalaria Zhao & Li, 2014 – China
- Tagalogonia Labarque & Griswold, 2014 – Philippines
- Tantra Labarque, Piacentini, Pons, Hormiga, Arnedo & Ramirez, 2025 – Panama, Ecuador
- Theridiosoma O. Pickard-Cambridge, 1879 – South America, Africa, Oceania, North America, Asia, Central America, Jamaica
- Wendilgarda Keyserling, 1886 – Asia, São Tomé and Príncipe, Central America, Brazil, Mexico, Caribbean
- Zoma Saaristo, 1996 – China, Seychelles

=== Fossil species ===
Ray spiders have a relatively long geological history, with fossils known from the Mesozoic era. The family's fossil record includes:

- †Eoepeirotypus Wunderlich 2004 Baltic amber, Eocene
- †Eotheridiosoma Wunderlich 2004 Bitterfeld amber, Baltic amber, Eocene
- †Palaeoepeirotypus Wunderlich 1988 Dominican amber, Miocene
- †Umerosoma Wunderlich 2004 Baltic amber, Eocene
- †"Baalzebub" mesozoicum Penney 2014 - Vendée amber, France, Turonian later considered to be stem-theridiosomatid
