= Allan Frost Archer =

American entomologist

- Born: January 22, 1908; Boston, Massachusetts, US
- Died: May 9, 1994 (aged 86); Milledgeville, Georgia, US
- Scientific career
- Fields: Zoologist, Entomologist, Arachnologist, Malacologist
- Workplaces: Alabama Museum of Natural History, University of Alabama.
- Author abbrev. (zoology): Archer

Allan Frost Archer (January 22, 1908 – 1994, fl. 1940–1971), was an American arachnologist, entomologist and malacologist. He was the curator of Arachnida at the Alabama Museum of Natural History in University, Alabama. Archer was active in the latter half of the twentieth century, especially between 1940 and 1971, when he described numerous species of arachnids and snails in a number of states in the United States and elsewhere. The World Spider Catalog lists 29 genera of spiders named by Archer, of which 16 are still accepted as of September 2016.

Allen Frost Archer was the author of about 26 scientific papers and was responsible for describing a number of terrestrial snail taxa in his malacological career which spanned over 30 years. His specimen collection of 1600 lots of terrestrial snails seems to have passed to Dr. John C. Hurd (LaGrange College, Georgia) and subsequently to the Auburn University Natural History Learning Center and Museum (AUNHLCM) in 2002. Many of the specimens in the collection are too old to have been collected by Dr. Archer and so were presumably obtained by trading with museums. Dr. Archer's collecting activities were mainly in southeastern North America but during the later years of his life he made collections from throughout the Americas, Europe, Asia, and many Pacific and Caribbean Islands.

He was married to Mableanne Hanson on 31 July 1942. His son Allan Frost Archer, Jr. was born in Decatur, Alabama on 23 December 1943 and was ordained into the Orthodox church as a priest in 1996 and took the name Aaron.

== Publications ==
The following is an incomplete list.

- Archer, Allan F. (1940). "The Argiopidae or orb-weaving spiders of Alabama". Museum Papers of the Alabama Museum of Natural History
- Archer, Allan F. & Clench, William J. (1930). "New Land Snails from Tanganyika Territory". Occasional Papers of the Boston Society of Natural History, vol. 5, pp 295–300, 1 plate.
- Archer, A. F. (1941). "Alabama spiders of the family Mimetidae". Papers of the Michigan Academy of Science, Arts and Letters 27: 183–193.
- Archer, A. F. (1941). "Supplement to the Argiopidae of Alabama". Museum Paper, Geological Survey of Alabama 18: 1-47.
- Archer, Allan F. (1946). "The Theridiidae or Comb-footed Spiders of Alabama". Museum Papers of the Alabama Museum of Natural History, 22: p. 31
- Archer, A. F. (1950). "A study of theridiid and mimetid spiders with descriptions of new genera and species". Museum Paper, Alabama Museum of Natural History 30: 1-40.
- Archer, A. F. (1951). "Studies in the orbweaving spiders (Argiopidae). 1". American Museum Novitates 1487: 1-52.
- Archer, A. F. (1951). "Studies in the orbweaving spiders (Argiopidae). 2". American Museum Novitates 1502: 1-34.
- Archer, A. F. (1951). "Remarks on certain European genera of argiopid spiders". Chicago Academy of Sciences, Natural History Miscellanea 84: 1–4.
- Archer, A. F. (1951). "A new species of Gasteracantha (Argiopidae) from São Tomé Island, West Africa". Chicago Academy of Sciences, Natural History Miscellanea 90: 1–3.
- Archer, A. F. (1953). "Studies in the orbweaving spiders (Argiopidae). 3". American Museum Novitates 1622: 1-27.
- Archer, A. F. (1958). "Studies in the orbweaving spiders (Argiopidae). 4". American Museum Novitates 1922: 1-21.
- Archer, A. F. (1960). "A new genus of Argiopidae from Japan". Acta Arachnologica, Tokyo 17: 13–14.
- Archer, A. F. (1963). "Catalogo de las arañas chilenas de las families de la division Metarachnae". Publicaciones Ocasionales del Museo Nacional de Historia Natural, Santiago 1: 1-32.
- Archer, A. F. (1965). "A new species of Cyphalonotus from Central Africa". Revue de Zoologie et de Botanique Africaines 72: 79–82.
- Archer, A. F. (1965). "Nuevos argiopidos (arañas) de las Antilles". Caribbean Journal of Science 5: 129–133.
- Archer, A. F. (1971). "Especies nuevas de argiopidos peruanos". Revista Peruana de Entomología Agricola 14: 157–159.
- Bryant, E. B. & Archer, A. F. (1940). "Notes on Epeira pentagona Hentz." Psyche: A Journal of Entomology 47: 60–65.
- Gertsch, W. J. & Archer, A. F. (1942). "Descriptions of new American Theridiidae". American Museum Novitates 1171: 1–16.
- Yaginuma, T. & Archer, A. F. (1959). "Genera of the araneine Argiopidae found in the Oriental region, and generally placed under the comprehensive genus, Araneus. 1." Acta Arachnologica, Tokyo 16: 34–41.
