= List of Hexathelidae species =

This page lists all described species of the spider family Hexathelidae accepted by the World Spider Catalog as of January 2021:

== † Alioatrax ==
† Alioatrax Wunderlich, 2017

- † A. incertus Wunderlich, 2017

== Bymainiella ==
Bymainiella Raven, 1978

- B. lugubris Raven, 1978 — Australia (New South Wales)
- B. monteithi Raven, 1978 — Australia (Queensland, New South Wales)
- B. polesoni Raven, 1978 — Australia (New South Wales)
- B. terraereginae (Raven, 1976) (type) — Australia (Queensland, New South Wales)

== Hexathele ==
Hexathele

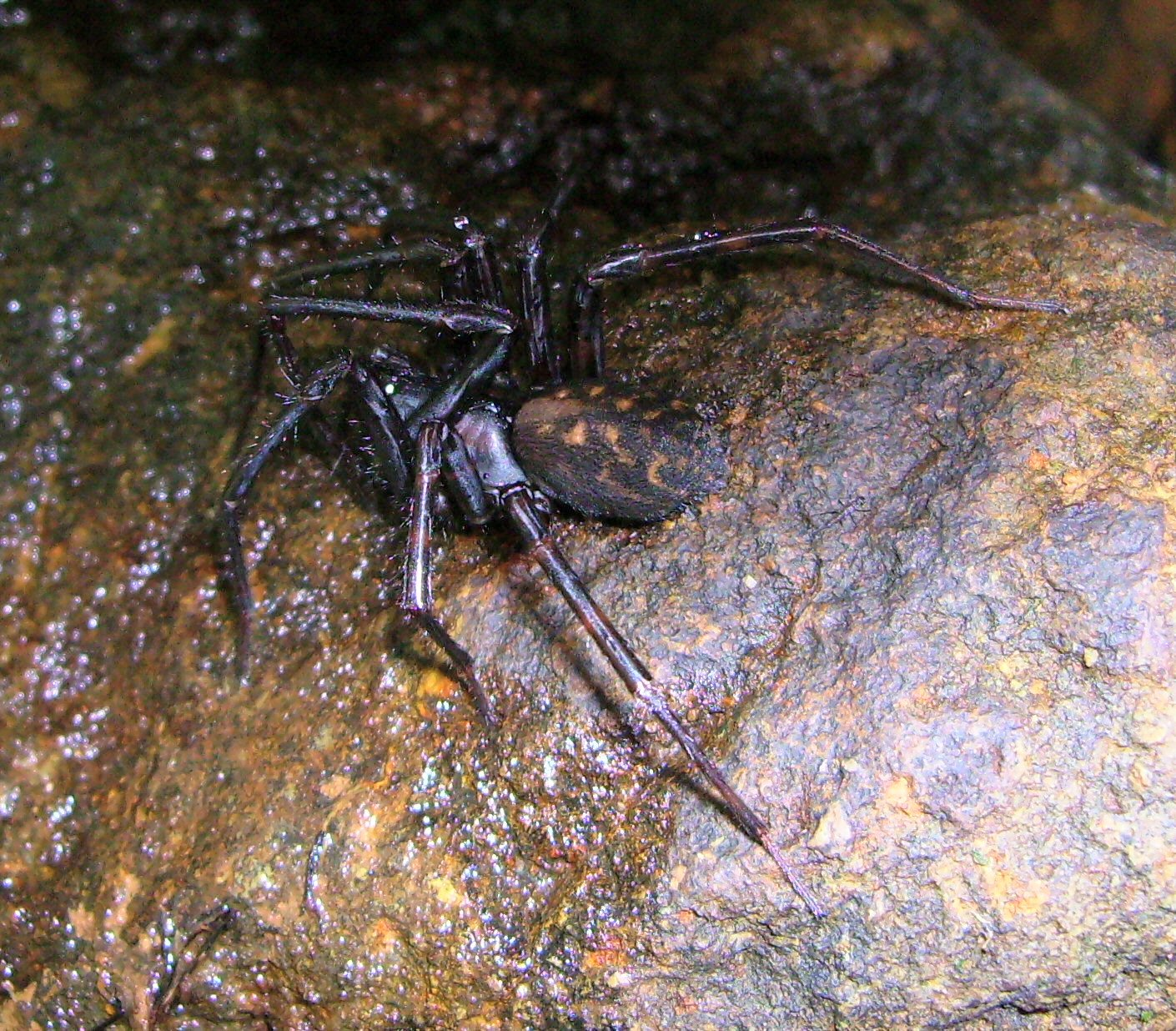
Banded tunnel web spider
(Hexathele hochstetteri)

Hexathele Ausserer, 1871

- H. cantuaria Forster, 1968 — New Zealand
- H. cavernicola Forster, 1968 — New Zealand
- H. exemplar Parrott, 1960 — New Zealand
- H. hochstetteri Ausserer, 1871 (type) — New Zealand
- H. huka Forster, 1968 — New Zealand
- H. huttoni Hogg, 1908 — New Zealand
- H. kohua Forster, 1968 — New Zealand
- H. maitaia Forster, 1968 — New Zealand
- H. nigra Forster, 1968 — New Zealand
- H. otira Forster, 1968 — New Zealand
- H. para Forster, 1968 — New Zealand
- H. petriei Goyen, 1887 — New Zealand
- H. pukea Forster, 1968 — New Zealand
- H. putuna Forster, 1968 — New Zealand
- H. ramsayi Forster, 1968 — New Zealand
- H. rupicola Forster, 1968 — New Zealand
- H. taumara Forster, 1968 — New Zealand
- H. waipa Forster, 1968 — New Zealand
- H. waita Forster, 1968 — New Zealand
- H. wiltoni Forster, 1968 — New Zealand

== Mediothele ==
Mediothele Raven & Platnick, 1978

- M. anae Ríos-Tamayo & Goloboff, 2012 — Chile
- M. australis Raven & Platnick, 1978 (type) — Chile
- M. lagos Ríos-Tamayo & Goloboff, 2012 — Chile
- M. linares Ríos-Tamayo & Goloboff, 2012 — Chile
- M. minima Ríos-Tamayo & Goloboff, 2012 — Chile
- M. nahuelbuta Ríos-Tamayo & Goloboff, 2012 — Chile

== Paraembolides ==
Paraembolides Raven, 1980

- P. boycei (Raven, 1978) (type) — Australia (Queensland)
- P. boydi (Raven, 1978) — Australia (New South Wales)
- P. brindabella (Raven, 1978) — Australia (New South Wales, Australian Capital Territory)
- P. cannoni (Raven, 1978) — Australia (Queensland)
- P. grayi (Raven, 1978) — Australia (New South Wales)
- P. montisbossi (Raven, 1978) — Australia (New South Wales)
- P. tubrabucca (Raven, 1978) — Australia (New South Wales)
- P. variabilis (Raven, 1978) — Australia (New South Wales)

== Plesiothele ==
Plesiothele Raven, 1978

- P. fentoni (Hickman, 1936) (type) — Australia (Tasmania)

== Scotinoecus ==
Scotinoecus Simon, 1892

- S. cinereopilosus (Simon, 1889) (type) — Chile
- S. fasciatus Tullgren, 1901 — Chile, Argentina
- S. major Ríos-Tamayo & Goloboff, 2012 — Chile
- S. ruiles Ríos-Tamayo & Goloboff, 2012 — Chile

== Teranodes ==
Teranodes Raven, 1985

- T. montanus (Hickman, 1927) (type) — Australia (Tasmania, Victoria)
- T. otwayensis (Raven, 1978) — Australia (Victoria)
