= Macrobunus =

Scientific classification
- Kingdom: Animalia
- Phylum: Arthropoda
- Subphylum: Chelicerata
- Class: Arachnida
- Order: Araneae
- Infraorder: Araneomorphae
- Family: Macrobunidae
- Genus: Macrobunus; Tullgren, 1901

Type species
- Macrobunus backhauseni (Simon, 1896)

Diversity
- 5 species

Genus of spiders

Macrobunus is a genus of spiders in the family Amaurobiidae, known as hackled mesh-web weavers. It was first described by Albert Tullgren in 1901. The genus is represented by five species, with only one species known from South Africa and the rest recorded from South America.

== Description ==
Macrobunus spiders are small, with a total body size of 3-5 mm. They are recognized by their undivided cribellum. The carapace is oval with a longitudinal fovea. The anterior median eyes are larger than the posterior lateral eyes, and the anterior eye row is strongly recurved. The median ocular triangle is narrower anteriorly. The opisthosoma is long and oval.

Males have a distinctive spur on the first femora. Females possess an epigyne with a central septum.

== Ecology and behavior ==
Little is known about the behavior of Macrobunus spiders. They are ground dwellers that are typically sampled from pitfall traps.

== Species ==
As of September 2025, this genus includes four species:

- Bymainiella lugubris Raven, 1978 – Australia (New South Wales)
- Bymainiella monteithi Raven, 1978 – Australia (Queensland, New South Wales)
- Bymainiella polesoni Raven, 1978 – Australia (New South Wales)
- Bymainiella terraereginae (Raven, 1976) – Australia (Queensland, New South Wales) (type species)
