= Macrobunus caffer =

Scientific classification
- Kingdom: Animalia
- Phylum: Arthropoda
- Subphylum: Chelicerata
- Class: Arachnida
- Order: Araneae
- Infraorder: Araneomorphae
- Family: Macrobunidae
- Genus: Macrobunus
- Species: M. caffer

Binomial name
- Macrobunus caffer (Simon, 1898)

Species of spider

Macrobunus caffer is a species of spider in the genus Macrobunus. It is endemic to the Western Cape province of South Africa.

== Taxonomy ==
The species was originally described by Eugène Simon in 1898 as Myro caffer based on a female specimen. It was later transferred to the genus Macrobunus by Pekka T. Lehtinen in 1967.

== Distribution ==
Macrobunus caffer has been recorded from Cape Town and Jakobsbaai in the Saldanha Bay district of the Western Cape. The original type locality was given as "Bonae Spei" (Cape of Good Hope).

== Habitat ==
This species is a free-running ground dweller that inhabits the Fynbos biome.

== Description ==
Macrobunus caffer exhibits the characteristic features of the genus, including the small size (3-5 mm total body length) and undivided cribellum.

== Conservation ==
Macrobunus caffer is listed as Data Deficient for taxonomic reasons. The species is known only from two specimens from the Cape Peninsula and is undersampled. Urbanization in the Cape Town area poses a potential threat. More sampling is needed to collect males and determine the species' range.
