= Hexathele huttoni =

Conservation status
- Data Deficient (NZ TCS)

Scientific classification
- Kingdom: Animalia
- Phylum: Arthropoda
- Subphylum: Chelicerata
- Class: Arachnida
- Order: Araneae
- Infraorder: Mygalomorphae
- Family: Hexathelidae
- Genus: Hexathele
- Species: H. huttoni

Binomial name
- Hexathele huttoni Hogg, 1908

Species of spider

Hexathele huttoni is a species of mygalomorph spider endemic to New Zealand.

== Taxonomy ==
This species was described in 1908 by Henry Hogg from male and female specimens originally described as Hexathele hochstetteri in a 1901 publication by the same author. The specimens were collected in Pahiatua. The holotype is stored in the Natural History Museum.

== Description ==
The male is recorded at 18.9mm in length. The carapace and legs are dark brown. The abdomen is dark brown. The female is recorded at 28.5mm in length. The carapace and legs are dark orange brown. The abdomen is dark black-brown.

== Distribution ==
This species is only known from Pahiatua, New Zealand.

== Conservation status ==
Under the New Zealand Threat Classification System, this species is listed as Data Deficient with the qualifiers of "Data Poor: Size", "Data Poor: Trend" and "One Location".
