= Hexathele nigra =

Conservation status
- Not Threatened (NZ TCS)

Scientific classification
- Kingdom: Animalia
- Phylum: Arthropoda
- Subphylum: Chelicerata
- Class: Arachnida
- Order: Araneae
- Infraorder: Mygalomorphae
- Family: Hexathelidae
- Genus: Hexathele
- Species: H. nigra

Binomial name
- Hexathele nigra Forster, 1968

Species of spider

Hexathele nigra is a species of mygalomorph spider endemic to New Zealand.

== Taxonomy ==
This species is described in 1968 by Ray Forster from male and female specimens from Westland. The holotype is stored in Otago Museum.

== Description ==
The male is recorded at 16.5mm in length. The carapace is dark brown. The legs are black. The abdomen is blackish brown with five pale patches dorsally. The female is recorded at 16mm in length. The body colours are similar to the males.

== Distribution ==
This species is only known from Westland, New Zealand.

== Conservation status ==
Under the New Zealand Threat Classification System, this species is listed as Not Threatened.
