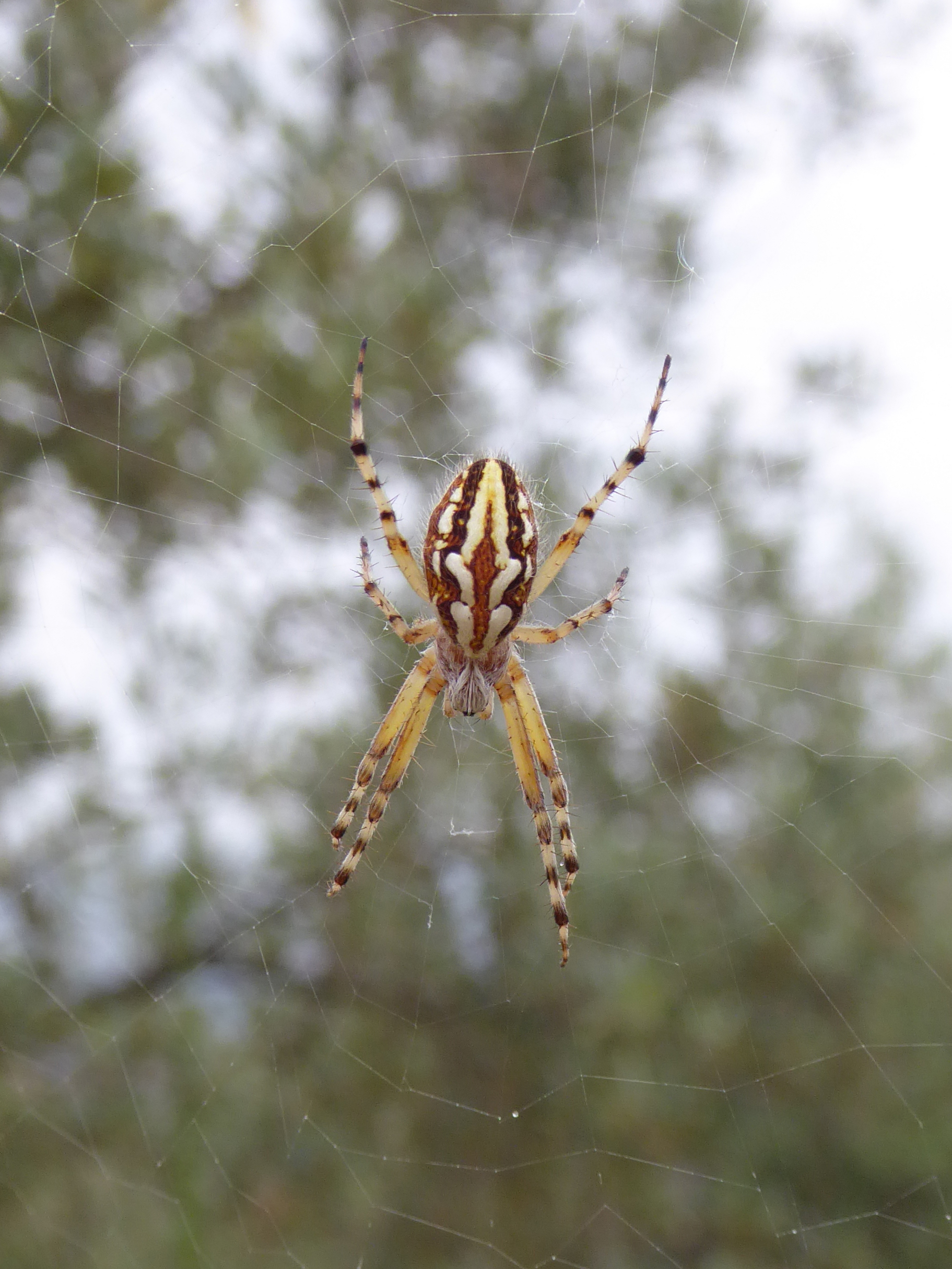

Scientific classification
- Kingdom: Animalia
- Phylum: Arthropoda
- Subphylum: Chelicerata
- Class: Arachnida
- Order: Araneae
- Infraorder: Araneomorphae
- Family: Araneidae
- Genus: Aculepeira
- Species: A. armida

Binomial name
- Aculepeira armida (Audouin, 1826)

Synonyms
- Epeira armida Audouin, 1826; Epeira hirsuta Hahn, 1831; Miranda exornata C. L. Koch, 1844; Miranda hirsuta (Hahn, 1831); Epeira victoria Thorell, 1870; Araneus armida (Audouin, 1826); Epeira sericea Franganillo, 1918; Aranea sericina Roewer, 1942; Aranea armida (Audouin, 1826); Araneus victoria (Thorell, 1870); Araneus armidus (Audouin, 1826); Araneus sericinus (Roewer, 1942)

= Aculepeira armida =

Species of spider

Aculepeira armida is an orb-weaver spider species (family Araneidae) with a wide distribution in North Africa, Southern Europe, Western Asia, Russia (from Europe to the Far East), and Central Asia to China.
