= Aculepeira lapponica =

Scientific classification
- Kingdom: Animalia
- Phylum: Arthropoda
- Subphylum: Chelicerata
- Class: Arachnida
- Order: Araneae
- Infraorder: Araneomorphae
- Family: Araneidae
- Genus: Aculepeira
- Species: A. lapponica

Binomial name
- Aculepeira lapponica (Holm, 1945)

Species of spider

Aculepeira lapponica is an orb-weaving spider found in Sweden, Finland and Russia.
