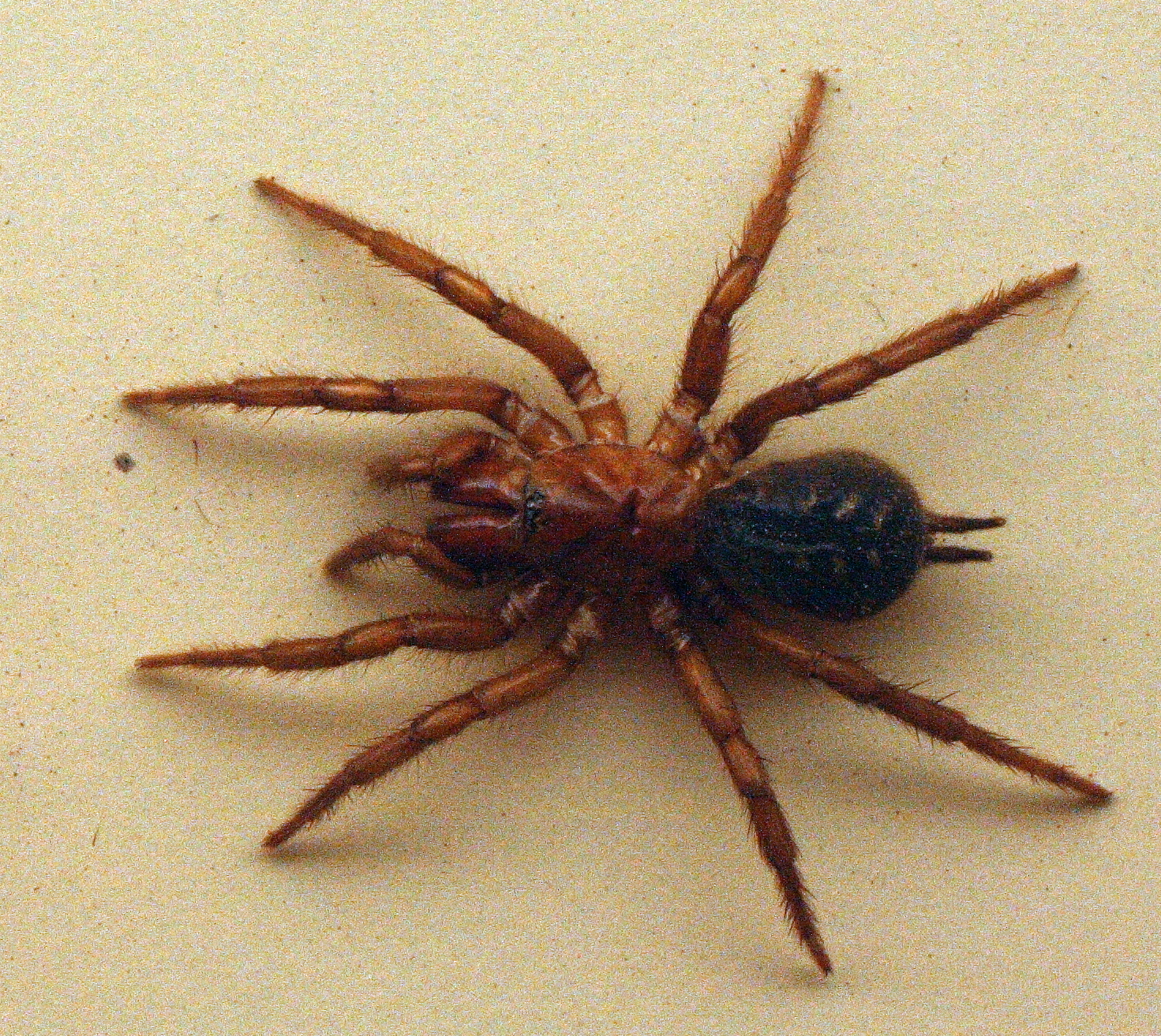

Scientific classification
- Kingdom: Animalia
- Phylum: Arthropoda
- Subphylum: Chelicerata
- Class: Arachnida
- Order: Araneae
- Infraorder: Mygalomorphae
- Family: Hexathelidae
- Genus: Paraembolides
- Species: P. variabilis

Binomial name
- Paraembolides variabilis (Raven, 1978)

Synonyms
- Bymainiella variabilis Raven, 1978

= Paraembolides variabilis =

Species of spider

Paraembolides variabilis is a species of funnel-web spider in the Hexathelidae family. It is endemic to Australia. It was described in 1978 by Australian arachnologist Robert Raven.

== Distribution and habitat ==
The species occurs in eastern New South Wales, in open, dry sclerophyll forest habitats. The type locality is Bilpin in the Blue Mountains.

== Behaviour ==
The spiders are terrestrial predators.
