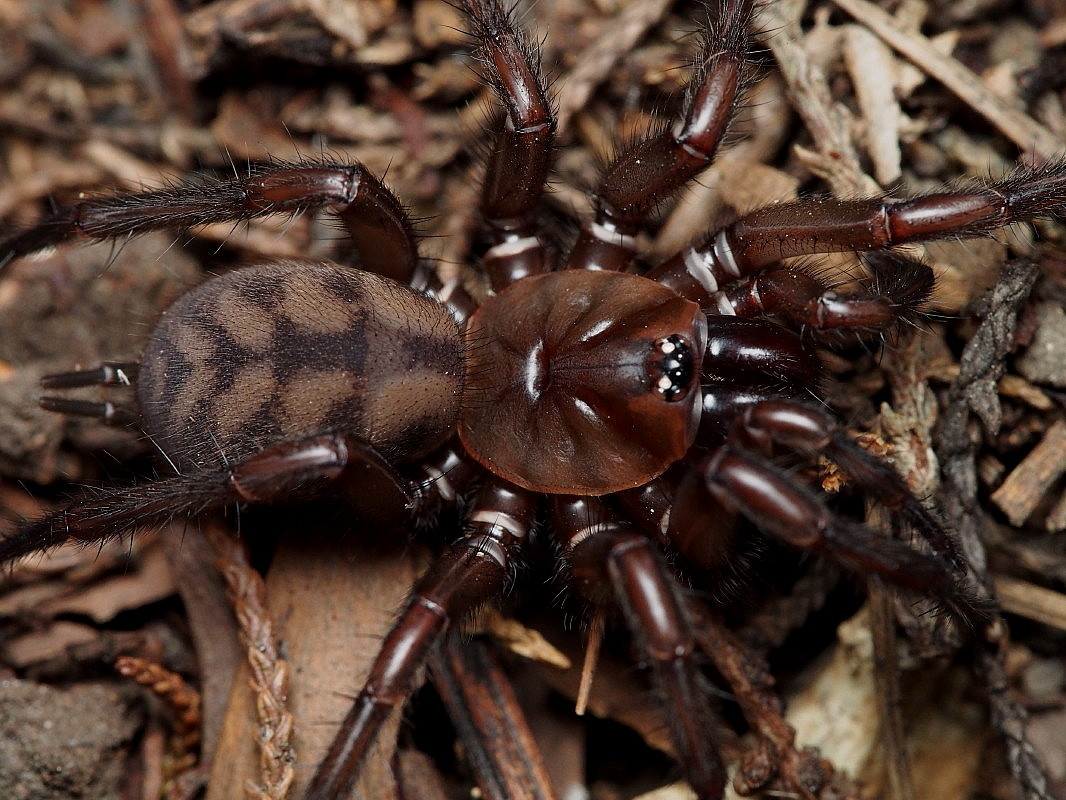

Conservation status
- Not Threatened (NZ TCS)

Scientific classification
- Kingdom: Animalia
- Phylum: Arthropoda
- Subphylum: Chelicerata
- Class: Arachnida
- Order: Araneae
- Infraorder: Mygalomorphae
- Family: Hexathelidae
- Genus: Hexathele
- Species: H. kohua

Binomial name
- Hexathele kohua Forster, 1968

= Hexathele kohua =

Species of spider

Hexathele kohua is a species of mygalomorph spider endemic to New Zealand.

== Taxonomy ==
This species is described in 1968 by Ray Forster from male and female specimens collected in Auckland. The holotype is stored in Otago Museum.

== Description ==
The male is recorded at 13.5 mm (0.53 in) in length. The carapace and legs are orange brown. The abdomen with five pairs of pale yellow patches.

== Distribution ==
This species is known from the North Island of New Zealand, and has also been identified on the Hen and Chicken Islands.

== Conservation status ==
Under the New Zealand Threat Classification System, this species is listed as Not Threatened.
