= Hexathele taumara =

Conservation status
- Data Deficient (NZ TCS)

Scientific classification
- Kingdom: Animalia
- Phylum: Arthropoda
- Subphylum: Chelicerata
- Class: Arachnida
- Order: Araneae
- Infraorder: Mygalomorphae
- Family: Hexathelidae
- Genus: Hexathele
- Species: H. taumara

Binomial name
- Hexathele taumara Forster, 1968

Species of spider

Hexathele taumara is a species of mygalomorph spider endemic to New Zealand.

== Taxonomy ==
This species was described in 1968 by Ray Forster from female and male specimens collected in Taumarunui. The holotype is stored at the Otago Museum.

== Description ==
The female is recorded at 16.5mm in length. The carapace and legs are brown. The abdomen is blackish brown and faint pale areas dorsally. The male is recorded at 24.8mm in length. The carapace and legs are orange brown. The abdomen is dark brown with a pale dorsal area.

== Distribution ==
This species is only known from Taumaranui, New Zealand.

== Conservation status ==
Under the New Zealand Threat Classification System, this species is listed as Data Deficient with the qualifiers of "Data Poor: Size", "Data Poor: Trend" and "One Location".
