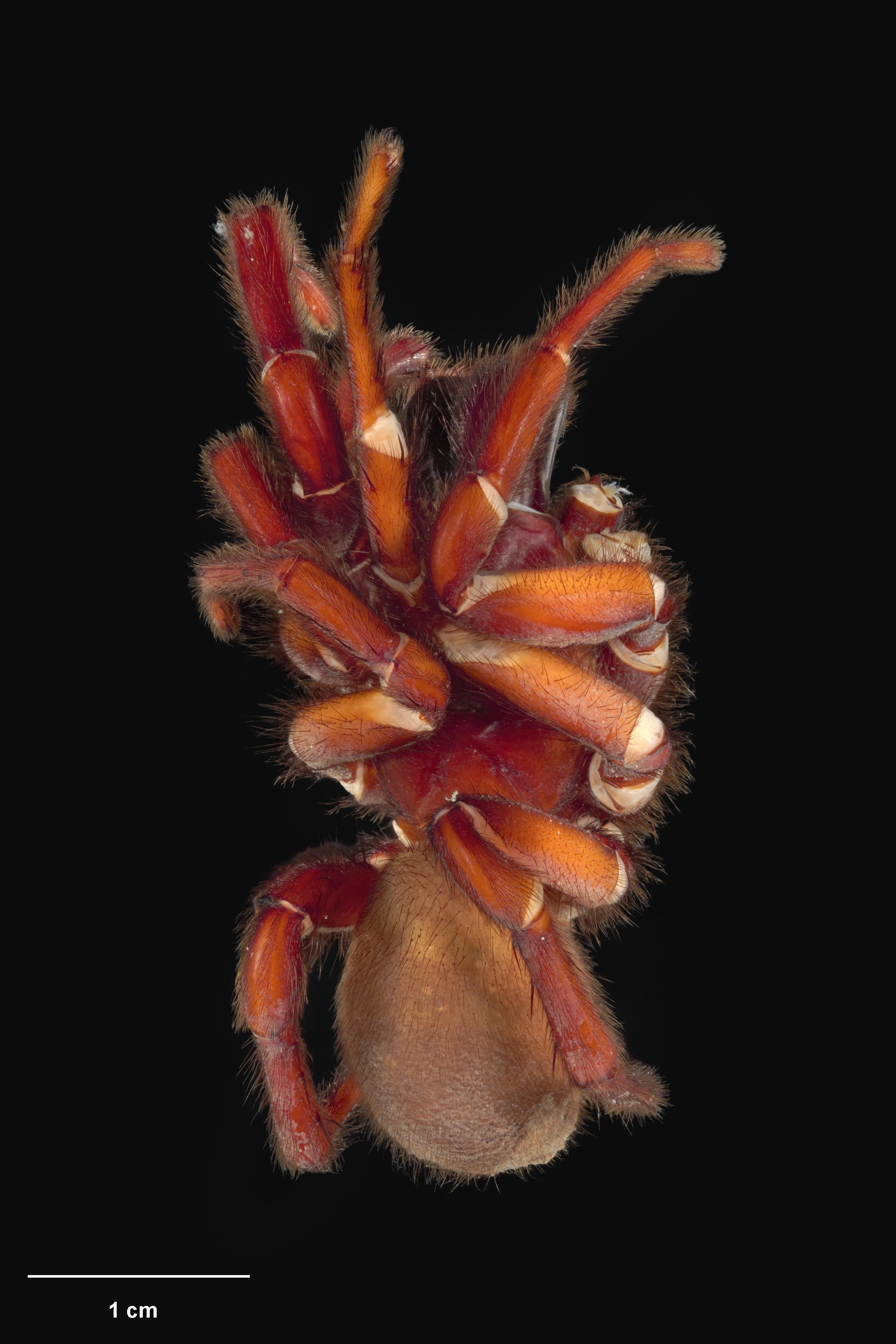

Conservation status
- Data Deficient (NZ TCS)

Scientific classification
- Kingdom: Animalia
- Phylum: Arthropoda
- Subphylum: Chelicerata
- Class: Arachnida
- Order: Araneae
- Infraorder: Mygalomorphae
- Family: Hexathelidae
- Genus: Hexathele
- Species: H. waita

Binomial name
- Hexathele waita Forster, 1968

= Hexathele waita =

Species of spider

Hexathele waita is a species of mygalomorph spider endemic to New Zealand.

== Taxonomy ==
This species was described in 1968 by Ray Forster from a single female specimen collected in Wellington. The holotype is stored at Te Papa Museum under registration number AS.000123.

== Description ==
The female is recorded at 28.5mm in length. The carapace and legs are dark reddish brown. The abdomen is dark brown.

== Distribution ==
This species is only known from the Tararua Ranges in Wellington, New Zealand.

== Conservation status ==
Under the New Zealand Threat Classification System, this species is listed as "Data Deficient" with the qualifiers of "Data Poor: Size", "Data Poor: Trend" and "One Location".
