= Hexathele rupicola =

Conservation status
- Data Deficient (NZ TCS)

Scientific classification
- Kingdom: Animalia
- Phylum: Arthropoda
- Subphylum: Chelicerata
- Class: Arachnida
- Order: Araneae
- Infraorder: Mygalomorphae
- Family: Hexathelidae
- Genus: Hexathele
- Species: H. rupicola

Binomial name
- Hexathele rupicola Forster, 1968

Species of spider

Hexathele rupicola is a species of Mygalomorph spider endemic to New Zealand.

== Taxonomy ==
This species was described in 1968 by Ray Forster from female specimens collected in Canterbury. The holotype is stored in Canterbury Museum.

== Description ==
The female is recorded at 19mm in length. The carapace and legs are yellow brown. The abdomen is cream with a faint chevron pattern dorsally.

== Distribution ==
This species is only known from Canterbury, New Zealand.

== Conservation status ==
Under the New Zealand Threat Classification System, this species is listed as Data Deficient with the qualifiers of "Data Poor: Size" and "Data Poor: Trend".
