= Paraembolides tubrabucca =

Scientific classification
- Kingdom: Animalia
- Phylum: Arthropoda
- Subphylum: Chelicerata
- Class: Arachnida
- Order: Araneae
- Infraorder: Mygalomorphae
- Family: Hexathelidae
- Genus: Paraembolides
- Species: P. tubrabucca

Binomial name
- Paraembolides tubrabucca (Raven, 1978)

Synonyms
- Bymainiella tubrabucca Raven, 1978

Species of spider

Paraembolides tubrabucca is a species of funnel-web spider in the Hexathelidae family. It is endemic to Australia. It was described in 1978 by Australian arachnologist Robert Raven.

== Distribution and habitat ==
The species occurs in eastern New South Wales, in open, wet sclerophyll forest habitats. The type locality is Tubrabucca, Barrington Tops.

== Behaviour ==
The spiders are terrestrial predators.
