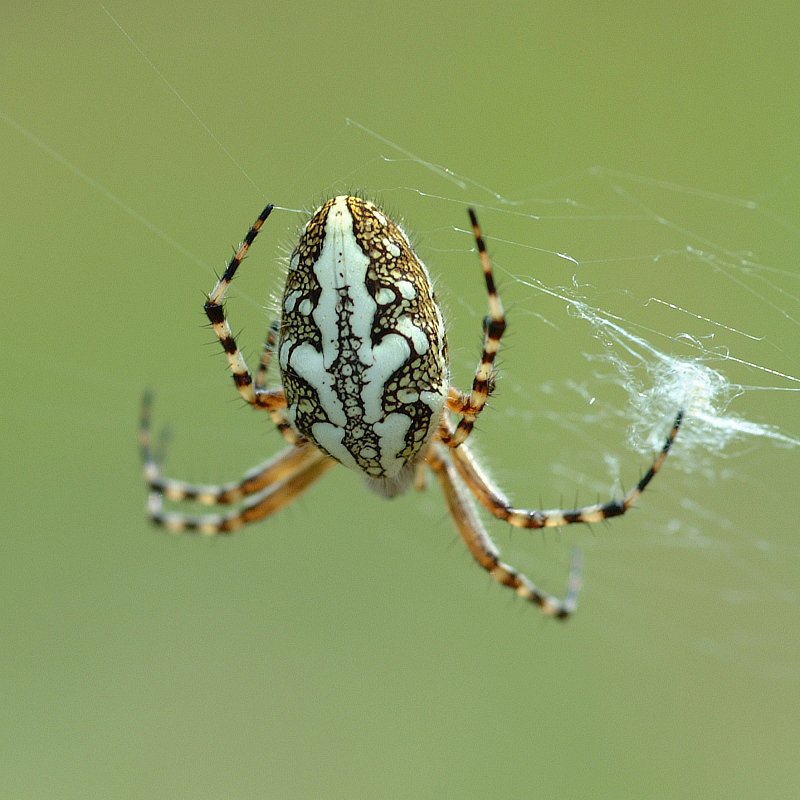
- A. ceropegia
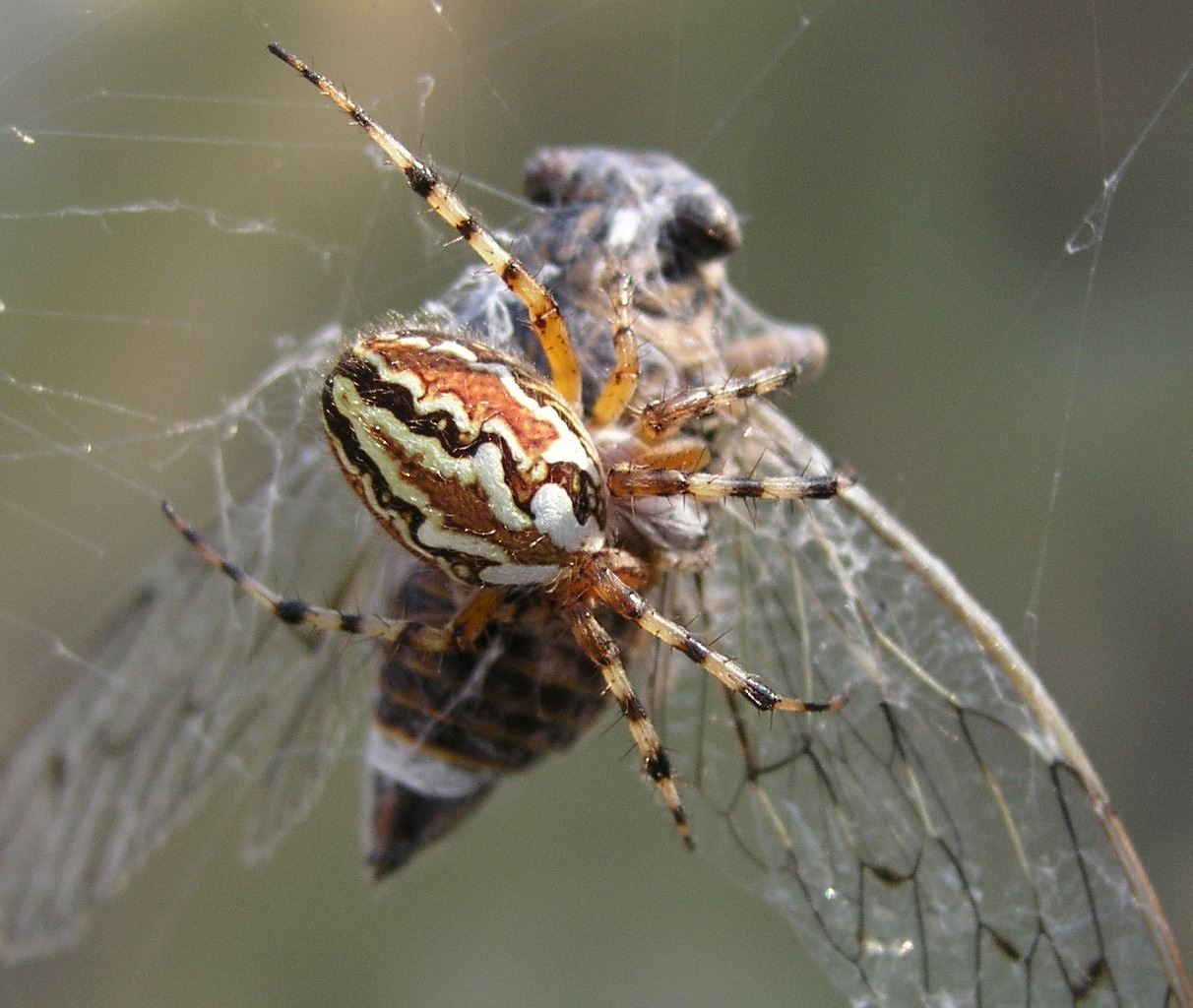
- A. armida

Scientific classification
- Kingdom: Animalia
- Phylum: Arthropoda
- Subphylum: Chelicerata
- Class: Arachnida
- Order: Araneae
- Infraorder: Araneomorphae
- Family: Araneidae
- Genus: Aculepeira; Chamberlin & Ivie, 1942

Type species
- A. packardi (Thorell, 1875)

Species
- 26, see text
- blue: reported countries (WSC)

= Aculepeira =

Genus of spiders

Aculepeira is a genus of orb-weaver spiders first described by R. V. Chamberlin & Wilton Ivie in 1942.

== Species ==
As of October 2026, this genus includes 26 species and two subspecies:

- Aculepeira aculifera (O. Pickard-Cambridge, 1889) – USA to Guatemala
- Aculepeira albovittata (Mello-Leitão, 1941) – Paraguay, Argentina
- Aculepeira angeloi Álvares, Loyola & De Maria, 2005 – Brazil
- Aculepeira annulipes (Lucas, 1838) – Canary Islands
- Aculepeira apa Levi, 1991 – Brazil, Paraguay
- Aculepeira armida (Audouin, 1826) – North Africa, Southern Europe, Turkey, Israel, Russia (Europe to Far East), Iran, Central Asia to China
  - A. a. orientalis (Kulczyński, 1901) – Russia (Asia), China
- Aculepeira azul Levi, 1991 – Panama
- Aculepeira busu Levi, 1991 – Hispaniola
- Aculepeira carbonaria (L. Koch, 1869) – Alps, southern Europe, Turkey, Russia (Europe and Central Asia), Kazakhstan
  - A. c. sinensis (Schenkel, 1953) – China
- Aculepeira carbonarioides (Keyserling, 1892) – Russia (Europe to Far East), Alaska, Canada, United States
- Aculepeira ceropegia (Walckenaer, 1802) – Europe, Turkey, Caucasus, Russia (Europe to West Siberia), Kazakhstan
- Aculepeira escazu Levi, 1991 – Costa Rica
- Aculepeira gravabilis (O. Pickard-Cambridge, 1889) – Honduras to Panama
- Aculepeira lapponica (Holm, 1945) – Sweden, Finland, Russia (Europe to West Siberia)
- Aculepeira luosangensis Yin, Wang, Xie & Peng, 1990 – China
- Aculepeira machu Levi, 1991 – Peru
- Aculepeira matsudae Tanikawa, 1994 – Russia (Far East), Japan
- Aculepeira morenoae Rubio, Izquierdo & Piacentini, 2013 – Argentina
- Aculepeira packardi (Thorell, 1875) – North America, Russia (Urals to Far East), Kazakhstan, China
- Aculepeira serpentina Guo & Zhang, 2010 – China
- Aculepeira sogdiana (Charitonov, 1969) – Uzbekistan
- Aculepeira taibaishanensis Zhu & Wang, 1995 – China
- Aculepeira talishia (Zawadsky, 1902) – Turkey, Iran, Caucasus to Central Asia
- Aculepeira travassosi (Soares & Camargo, 1948) – Mexico to Argentina
- Aculepeira visite Levi, 1991 – Hispaniola
- Aculepeira vittata (Gerschman & Schiapelli, 1948) – Brazil, Paraguay, Argentina
