= Hexathele para =

Conservation status
- Data Deficient (NZ TCS)

Scientific classification
- Kingdom: Animalia
- Phylum: Arthropoda
- Subphylum: Chelicerata
- Class: Arachnida
- Order: Araneae
- Infraorder: Mygalomorphae
- Family: Hexathelidae
- Genus: Hexathele
- Species: H. para

Binomial name
- Hexathele para Forster, 1968

Species of spider

Hexathele para is a species of mygalomorph spider endemic to New Zealand.

== Taxonomy ==
This species was described in 1968 by Ray Forster from female and male specimens collected in Taranaki. The holotype is stored in Otago Museum.

== Description ==
The female is recorded at 18.8mm in length. The carapace and legs are dark brown. The abdomen is pale yellow dorsally with 4-5 chevron patterns. The male is identical except in the male leg modifications of typical of Hexathele.

== Distribution ==
This species is only known from Taranaki, New Zealand.

== Conservation status ==
Under the New Zealand Threat Classification System, this species is listed as Data Deficient with the qualifiers of "Data Poor: Size" and "Data Poor: Trend".
