= Hexathele cantuaria =

Conservation status
- Data Deficient (NZ TCS)

Scientific classification
- Kingdom: Animalia
- Phylum: Arthropoda
- Subphylum: Chelicerata
- Class: Arachnida
- Order: Araneae
- Infraorder: Mygalomorphae
- Family: Hexathelidae
- Genus: Hexathele
- Species: H. cantuaria

Binomial name
- Hexathele cantuaria Forster, 1968

Species of spider

Hexathele cantuaria is a species of mygalomorph spider endemic to New Zealand.

== Taxonomy ==
This species was described in 1968 by Ray Forster from female specimens collected in Canterbury. The holotype is stored in Canterbury Museum.

== Description ==
The female is recorded at 20.3mm in length. The carapace and legs are dark reddish brown. The abdomen is dark brown with four pairs of dorsal pale patches.

== Distribution ==
This species is only known from Canterbury, New Zealand.

== Conservation status ==
Under the New Zealand Threat Classification System, this species is listed as Data Deficient with the qualifiers of "Data Poor: Size" and "Data Poor: Trend".
