= Hexathele waipa =

Conservation status
- Not Threatened (NZ TCS)

Scientific classification
- Kingdom: Animalia
- Phylum: Arthropoda
- Subphylum: Chelicerata
- Class: Arachnida
- Order: Araneae
- Infraorder: Mygalomorphae
- Family: Hexathelidae
- Genus: Hexathele
- Species: H. waipa

Binomial name
- Hexathele waipa Forster, 1968

Species of spider

Hexathele waipa is a species of mygalomorph spider endemic to New Zealand.

== Taxonomy ==
This species was described in 1968 by Ray Forster from female specimens collected in Otago and Southland. The holotype is stored in Otago Museum.

== Description ==
The female is recorded at 20mm in length. The carapace and legs are reddish brown. The abdomen with a dark central line and chevron patterns dorsally.

== Distribution ==
This species is only known from Otago and Southland, New Zealand.

== Conservation status ==
Under the New Zealand Threat Classification System, this species is listed as Not Threatened.
