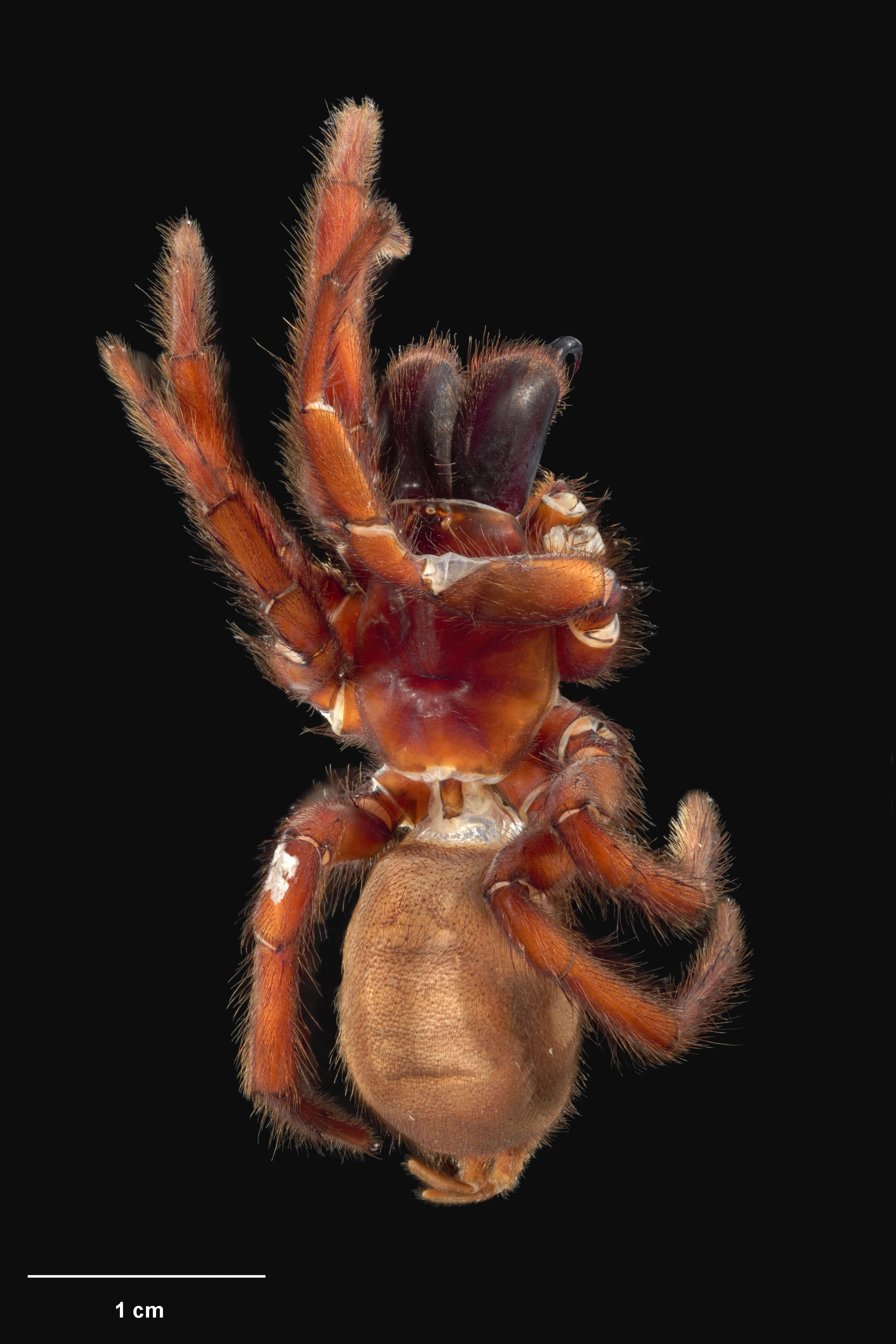

Conservation status
- Data Deficient (NZ TCS)

Scientific classification
- Kingdom: Animalia
- Phylum: Arthropoda
- Subphylum: Chelicerata
- Class: Arachnida
- Order: Araneae
- Infraorder: Mygalomorphae
- Family: Hexathelidae
- Genus: Hexathele
- Species: H. maitaia

Binomial name
- Hexathele maitaia Forster, 1968

= Hexathele maitaia =

Species of spider

Hexathele maitaia is a species of Mygalomorph spider endemic to New Zealand.

== Taxonomy ==
This species is described in 1968 by Ray Forster from a single female specimen collected in Nelson. The holotype is stored in Te Papa Museum under registration number AS.000061.

== Description ==
The female is recorded at 22mm in length. The carapace and legs are dark reddish brown. The abdomen is dark brown.

== Distribution ==
This species is only known from Maitai Valley in Nelson, New Zealand.

== Conservation status ==
Under the New Zealand Threat Classification System, this species is listed as Data Deficient with the qualifiers of "Data Poor: Size", "Data Poor: Trend" and "One Location".
