= Hexathele exemplar =

Conservation status
- Data Deficient (NZ TCS)

Scientific classification
- Kingdom: Animalia
- Phylum: Arthropoda
- Subphylum: Chelicerata
- Class: Arachnida
- Order: Araneae
- Infraorder: Mygalomorphae
- Family: Hexathelidae
- Genus: Hexathele
- Species: H. exemplar

Binomial name
- Hexathele exemplar Forster, 1968

Species of spider

Hexathele exemplar is a species of mygalomorph spider endemic to New Zealand.

== Taxonomy ==
This species was described in 1960 by Arthur Parrott from female and male specimens collected in Westland. The holotype is stored at the New Zealand Arthropod Collection under registration number NZAC03018109.

== Description ==
The female is recorded at 20mm in length. The carapace and legs are reddish brown. The abdomen is greyish brown with a pair of pale areas on the antero-dorsal surface. The male is recorded at 20mm in length. The carapace and legs are dark orange brown. The abdomen is dark black brown but more pale on the antero-dorsal surface.

== Distribution ==
This species is only known from Westland, New Zealand.

== Conservation status ==
Under the New Zealand Threat Classification System, this species is listed as Data Deficient with the qualifiers of "Data Poor: Size", "Data Poor: Trend" and "One Location".
