= Hexathele otira =

Conservation status
- Not Threatened (NZ TCS)

Scientific classification
- Kingdom: Animalia
- Phylum: Arthropoda
- Subphylum: Chelicerata
- Class: Arachnida
- Order: Araneae
- Infraorder: Mygalomorphae
- Family: Hexathelidae
- Genus: Hexathele
- Species: H. otira

Binomial name
- Hexathele otira Forster, 1968

Species of spider

Hexathele otira is a species of Mygalomorph spider endemic to New Zealand.

== Taxonomy ==
This species is described in 1968 by Ray Forster from female and male specimens collected in Westland and Canterbury. The holotype is stored in Canterbury Museum.

== Description ==
The female is recorded at 20.5mm in length. The carapace is red to orange brown. The legs are dark brown. The abdomen is dark brow with five pale patches dorsally. The male is recorded at 15.5mm in length. The colouration is similar to the female, but the carapace and legs are darker.

== Distribution ==
This species is only known from Westland and Canterbury, New Zealand.

== Conservation status ==
Under the New Zealand Threat Classification System, this species is listed as Not Threatened.
