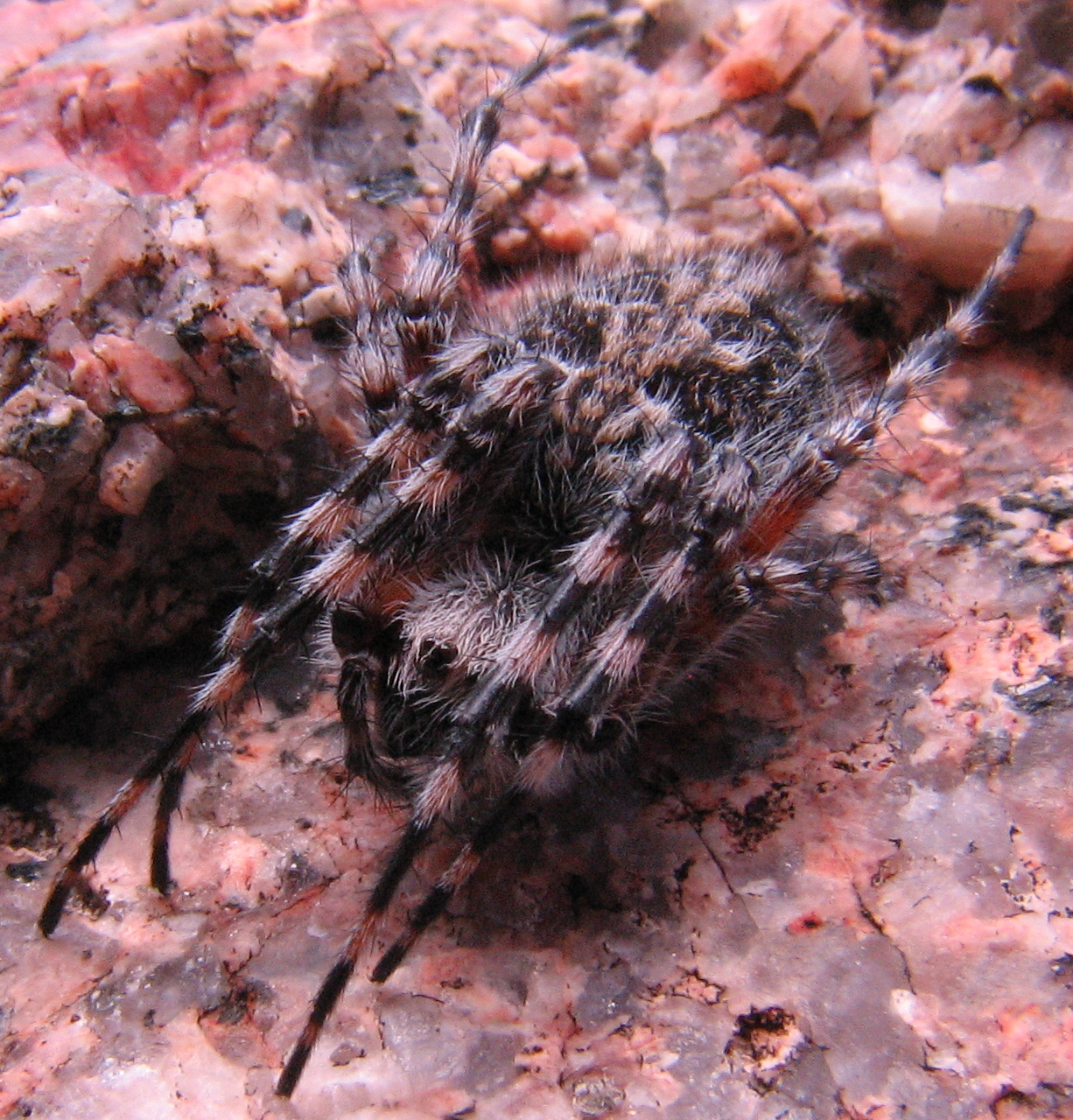

Conservation status
- Secure (NatureServe)

Scientific classification
- Kingdom: Animalia
- Phylum: Arthropoda
- Subphylum: Chelicerata
- Class: Arachnida
- Order: Araneae
- Infraorder: Araneomorphae
- Family: Araneidae
- Genus: Aculepeira
- Species: A. carbonarioides

Binomial name
- Aculepeira carbonarioides Keyserling, 1892

= Aculepeira carbonarioides =

Species of spider

Aculepeira carbonarioides is a spider in the orb-weaver family (Araneidae).

It is commonly found in the rocky crevices of boulder-strewn slopes, at or close by the tree line; reported from Canada (Alberta, British Columbia, Northwest Territory, Quebec and Yukon Territory) and the United States (Alaska, Colorado, New Hampshire, Utah and Wyoming). A. carbonarioides reportedly stays in the center of its web during daylight hours.
