= Paraembolides boycei =

Scientific classification
- Kingdom: Animalia
- Phylum: Arthropoda
- Subphylum: Chelicerata
- Class: Arachnida
- Order: Araneae
- Infraorder: Mygalomorphae
- Family: Hexathelidae
- Genus: Paraembolides
- Species: P. boycei

Binomial name
- Paraembolides boycei (Raven, 1978)

Synonyms
- Bymainiella boycei Raven, 1978

Species of spider

Paraembolides boycei is a species of funnel-web spider in the Hexathelidae family. It is endemic to Australia. It was described in 1978 by Australian arachnologist Robert Raven.

== Distribution and habitat ==
The species occurs in southern Queensland in closed forest habitats. The type locality is the Bunya Mountains.

== Behaviour ==
The spiders are arboreal and terrestrial predators that build silken tube retreats.
