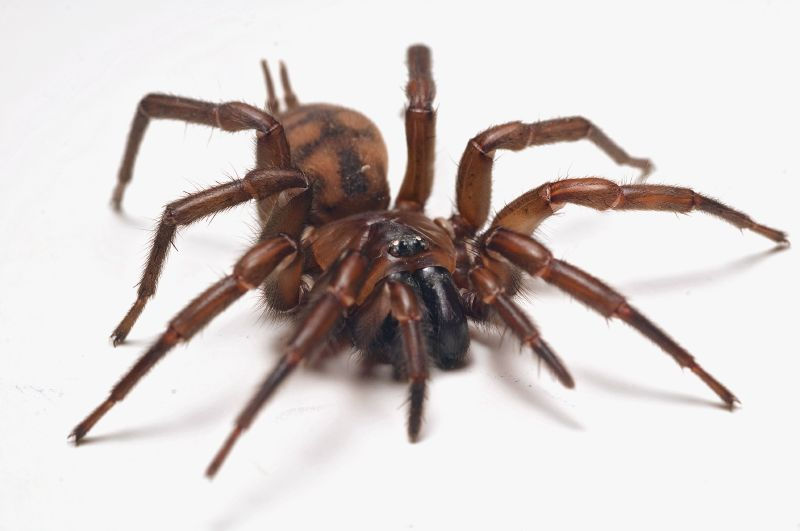
- Female Hexathele hochstetteri

Scientific classification
- Kingdom: Animalia
- Phylum: Arthropoda
- Subphylum: Chelicerata
- Class: Arachnida
- Order: Araneae
- Infraorder: Mygalomorphae
- Family: Hexathelidae
- Genus: Hexathele; Ausserer, 1871

Type species
- H. hochstetteri Ausserer, 1871

Species
- 20, see text

= Hexathele =

Genus of spiders

Hexathele is a genus of tunnelweb spiders endemic to New Zealand that was first described by Anton Ausserer in 1871, though most others have been described by Raymond Robert Forster. Originally placed with the curtain web spiders, it was moved to the Hexathelidae in 1980.

== Description ==
Most species of Hexathele are relatively large spiders. Females of Hexathele waita, one of the largest species, may have a carapace 13 mm (0.5 in) long, and an abdomen 15 mm (0.6 in) long, with the longest leg (the fourth) being 38 mm (1.5 in) long in total. Hexathele species are generally brown to black in colour. Many species have a chevron pattern on the upper surface of the abdomen, with patterns often being unique to the species. The carapace of the cephalothorax has a more or less straight depression (fovea) in the centre. The eyes are arranged in a compact group. The male palp lacks tibial apophyses (projections), but the male's first pair of legs have double spines on the tibia. There are six spinnerets, with the posterior pair being three-segmented and relatively long.

== Taxonomy ==
The genus was erected by Anton Ausserer in 1871, for the species Hexathele hochstetteri. Mygalomorph spiders were initially very broadly categorized; in 1892, Eugène Simon placed Hexathele in the group Hexatheleae, subfamily Diplurinae, family Aviculariidae. Later the subfamily was raised to the family Dipluridae with Hexathelinae as a subfamily – the classification used by Raymond R. Forster when he described many new species. The subfamily was split off as a full family, Hexathelidae, by Robert J. Raven in 1980.

== Species ==
As of May 2019 it contains twenty species, all found in New Zealand:

- Hexathele cantuaria Forster, 1968 – New Zealand
- Hexathele cavernicola Forster, 1968 – New Zealand
- Hexathele exemplar Parrott, 1960 – New Zealand
- Hexathele hochstetteri Ausserer, 1871 (type) – New Zealand
- Hexathele huka Forster, 1968 – New Zealand
- Hexathele huttoni Hogg, 1908 – New Zealand
- Hexathele kohua Forster, 1968 – New Zealand
- Hexathele maitaia Forster, 1968 – New Zealand
- Hexathele nigra Forster, 1968 – New Zealand
- Hexathele otira Forster, 1968 – New Zealand
- Hexathele para Forster, 1968 – New Zealand
- Hexathele petriei Goyen, 1887 – New Zealand
- Hexathele pukea Forster, 1968 – New Zealand
- Hexathele putuna Forster, 1968 – New Zealand
- Hexathele ramsayi Forster, 1968 – New Zealand
- Hexathele rupicola Forster, 1968 – New Zealand
- Hexathele taumara Forster, 1968 – New Zealand
- Hexathele waipa Forster, 1968 – New Zealand
- Hexathele waita Forster, 1968 – New Zealand
- Hexathele wiltoni Forster, 1968 – New Zealand
