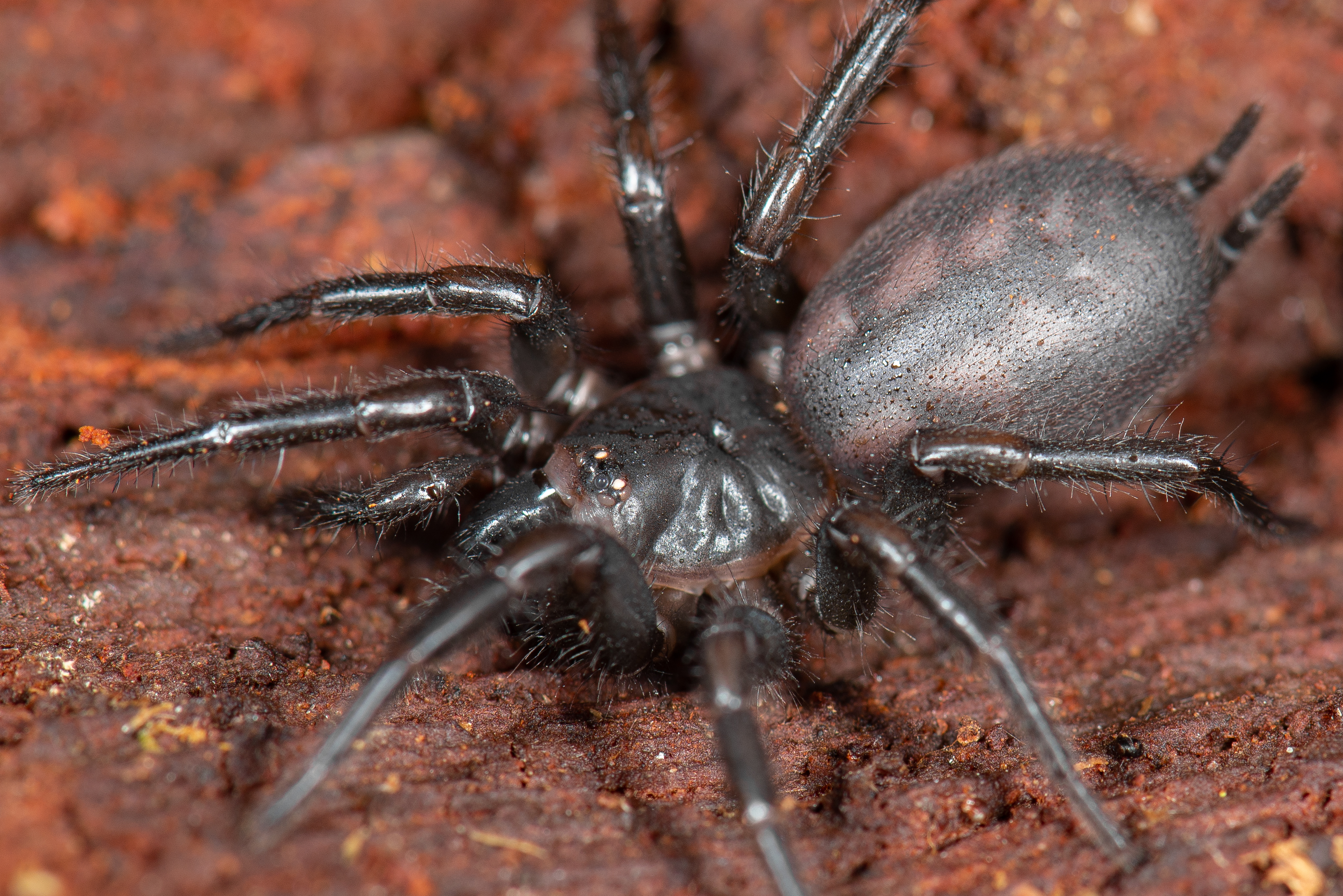
- Teranodes montanus, female

Scientific classification
- Kingdom: Animalia
- Phylum: Arthropoda
- Subphylum: Chelicerata
- Class: Arachnida
- Order: Araneae
- Infraorder: Mygalomorphae
- Family: Hexathelidae
- Genus: Teranodes
- Species: T. montanus

Binomial name
- Teranodes montanus (Hickman, 1927)

Synonyms
- Hexathele montanus Raven, 1978; Teranodes montana (Hickman, 1927)

= Teranodes montanus =

Species of spider

Teranodes montanus is a species of funnel-web spider in the Hexathelidae family. It is endemic to Australia. It was described in 1927 by Australian arachnologist Vernon Victor Hickman.

== Distribution and habitat ==
The species occurs in Tasmania and Victoria, in closed forest habitats. The type locality is the Higgs Track, Great Western Tiers, near Chudleigh, Tasmania.

== Behaviour ==
The spiders are fossorial, terrestrial predators that build silk-lined burrows beneath rocks and rotten logs.
