= Hexathele cavernicola =

Conservation status
- Data Deficient (NZ TCS)

Scientific classification
- Kingdom: Animalia
- Phylum: Arthropoda
- Subphylum: Chelicerata
- Class: Arachnida
- Order: Araneae
- Infraorder: Mygalomorphae
- Family: Hexathelidae
- Genus: Hexathele
- Species: H. cavernicola

Binomial name
- Hexathele cavernicola Forster, 1968

Species of spider

Hexathele cavernicola is a species of mygalomorph spider endemic to New Zealand.

== Taxonomy ==
This species was described in 1968 by Ray Forster from female specimens collected in Waitomo. The holotype is stored in the New Zealand Arthropod Collection under registration number NZAC03014965.

== Description ==
This female is recorded at 19.3mm in length. The carapace and legs are bright reddish brown. The abdomen is black with a pale area on the dorsal and anterior region.

== Distribution and habitat ==
This species is only known from Waitomo, New Zealand. Presently, it is only known to occur in caves.

== Conservation status ==
Under the New Zealand Threat Classification System, this species is listed as Data Deficient with the qualifiers of "Data Poor: Size", "Data Poor: Trend" and "One Location".
