= Paraembolides grayi =

Scientific classification
- Kingdom: Animalia
- Phylum: Arthropoda
- Subphylum: Chelicerata
- Class: Arachnida
- Order: Araneae
- Infraorder: Mygalomorphae
- Family: Hexathelidae
- Genus: Paraembolides
- Species: P. grayi

Binomial name
- Paraembolides grayi (Raven, 1978)

Synonyms
- Bymainiella grayi Raven, 1978

Species of spider

Paraembolides grayi is a species of funnel-web spider in the Hexathelidae family. It is endemic to Australia. It was described in 1978 by Australian arachnologist Robert Raven.

The species epithet, grayi, honours the arachnologist, Dr. Mike Gray.

== Distribution and habitat ==
The species occurs in south-eastern New South Wales, between Sydney and Wollongong, in dry sclerophyll open forest habitats. The type locality is the Royal National Park.

== Behaviour ==
The spiders are terrestrial predators.
