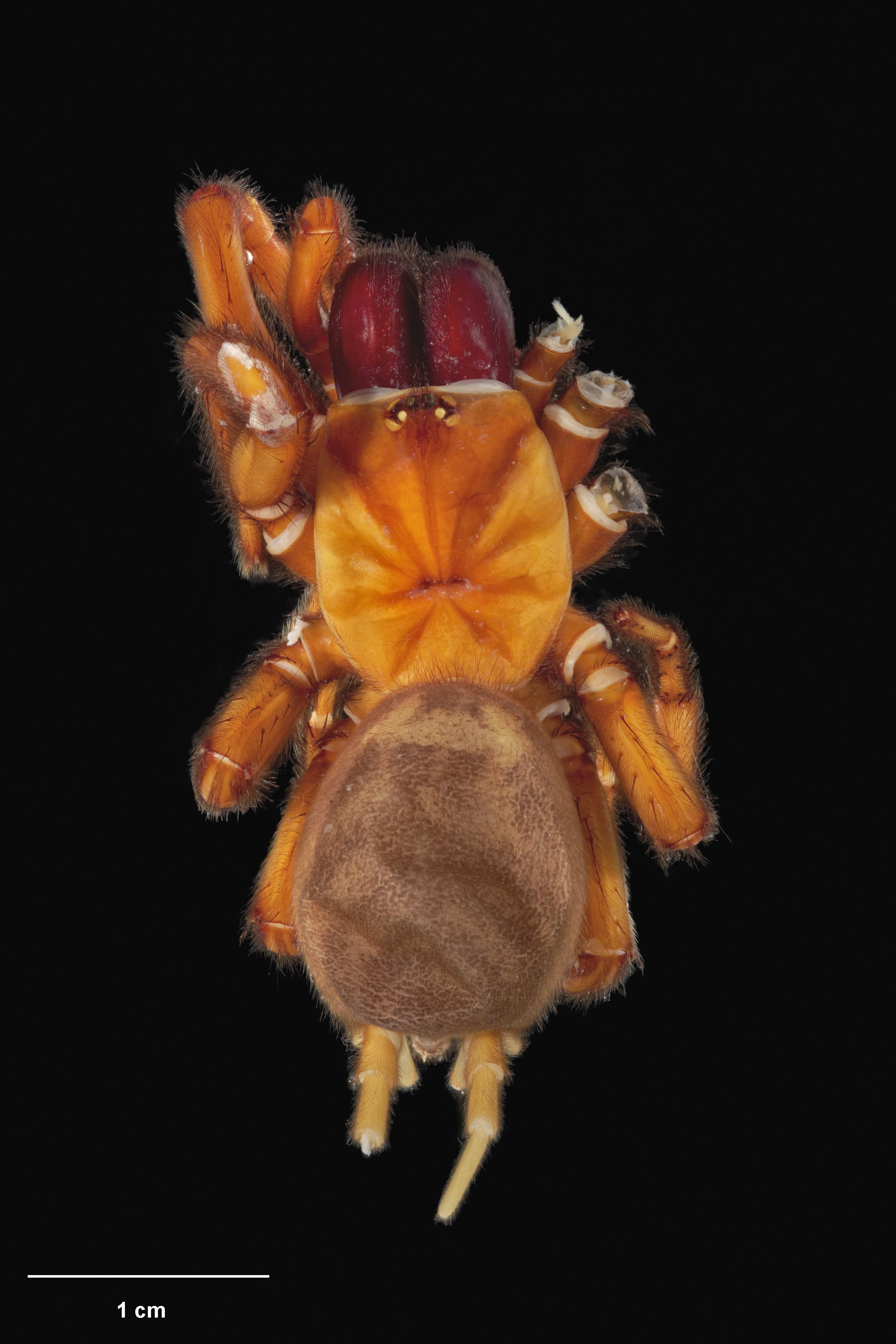

Conservation status
- Data Deficient (NZ TCS)

Scientific classification
- Kingdom: Animalia
- Phylum: Arthropoda
- Subphylum: Chelicerata
- Class: Arachnida
- Order: Araneae
- Infraorder: Mygalomorphae
- Family: Hexathelidae
- Genus: Hexathele
- Species: H. putuna

Binomial name
- Hexathele putuna Forster, 1968

= Hexathele putuna =

Species of spider

Hexathele putuna is a species of mygalomorph spider endemic to New Zealand.

== Taxonomy ==
This species was described in 1968 by Ray Forster from a single female specimen collected in Wairarapa. The holotype is stored in Te Papa Museum under registration number AS.000093.

== Description ==
The female is recorded at 24.5mm in length. The carapace and legs are orange brown. The abdomen is dark brown with faint chevrons dorsally.

== Distribution ==
This species is only known from Wairarapa, New Zealand.

== Conservation status ==
Under the New Zealand Threat Classification System, this species is listed as Data Deficient with the qualifiers of "Data Poor: Size", "Data Poor: Trend" and "One Location".
