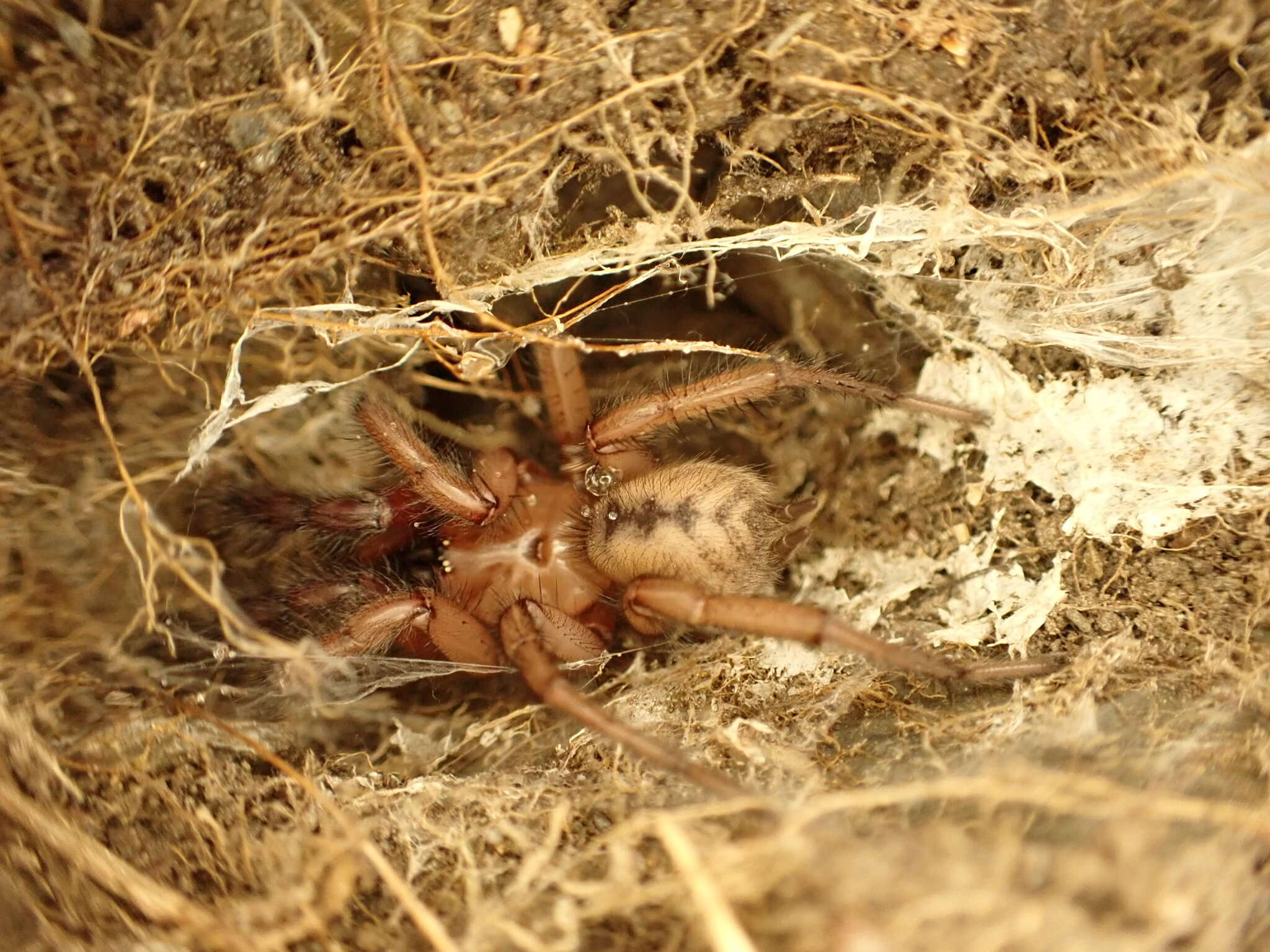

Conservation status
- Not Threatened (NZ TCS)

Scientific classification
- Kingdom: Animalia
- Phylum: Arthropoda
- Subphylum: Chelicerata
- Class: Arachnida
- Order: Araneae
- Infraorder: Mygalomorphae
- Family: Hexathelidae
- Genus: Hexathele
- Species: H. petriei

Binomial name
- Hexathele petriei Goyen, 1887

Synonyms
- Hexathele petrieii

= Hexathele petriei =

Species of spider

Hexathele petriei is a species of mygalomorph spider endemic to New Zealand.

== Taxonomy ==
This species was described as Hexathele petrieii in 1887 by Peter Goyen from female and male specimens collected in Otago. The original material has since been lost. It was most recently revised in 1968 by Ray Forster. The neotype is stored in Otago Museum.

== Description ==
The female is recorded at 18mm in length. The carapace and legs are pale yellow brown. The abdomen is yellow with a dark patch dorsally.

== Distribution and habitat ==
This species is only known from Central Otago, New Zealand. It occurs in dry open habitat. Its burrows have been found in association with Raoulia eximia.

== Conservation status ==
Under the New Zealand Threat Classification System, this species is listed as Not Threatened.
