= Paraembolides boydi =

Scientific classification
- Kingdom: Animalia
- Phylum: Arthropoda
- Subphylum: Chelicerata
- Class: Arachnida
- Order: Araneae
- Infraorder: Mygalomorphae
- Family: Hexathelidae
- Genus: Paraembolides
- Species: P. boydi

Binomial name
- Paraembolides boydi (Raven, 1978)

Synonyms
- Bymainiella boydi Raven, 1978

Species of spider

Paraembolides boydi is a species of funnel-web spider in the family Hexathelidae. It is endemic to Australia. It was first described in 1978 by Australian arachnologist Robert Raven.

== Distribution and habitat ==
The species occurs in south-eastern New South Wales, sheltering in and beneath logs in open forest habitats. The type locality is Mount Edwards, on the Boyd Plateau in the Jenolan region.

== Behaviour ==
The spiders are terrestrial predators.
