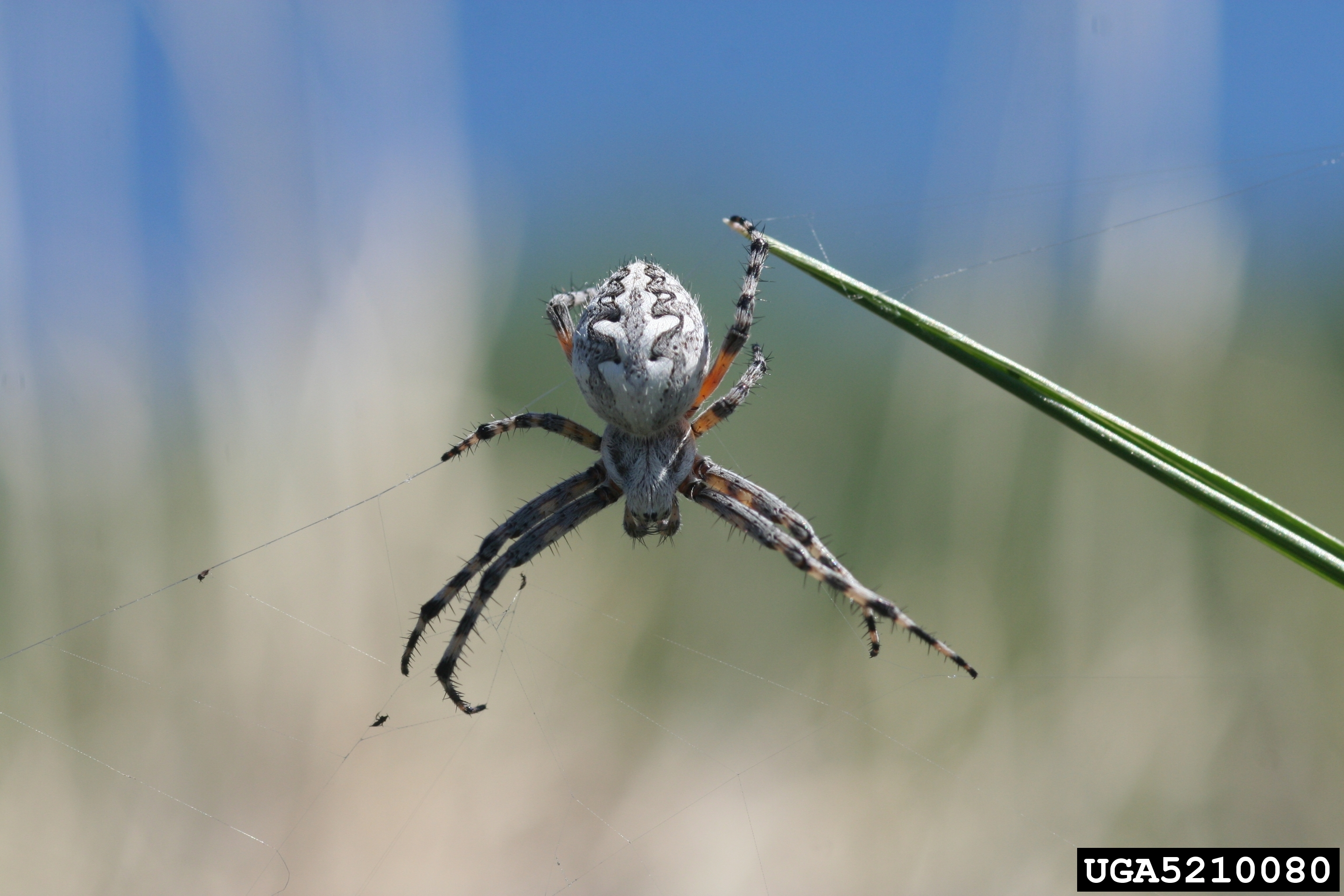

Conservation status
- Secure (NatureServe)

Scientific classification
- Kingdom: Animalia
- Phylum: Arthropoda
- Subphylum: Chelicerata
- Class: Arachnida
- Order: Araneae
- Infraorder: Araneomorphae
- Family: Araneidae
- Genus: Aculepeira
- Species: A. packardi

Binomial name
- Aculepeira packardi (Thorell, 1875)

= Aculepeira packardi =

Species of spider

Aculepeira packardi is a species of orb weaver in the spider family Araneidae, which lives in North America, Russia, China and Kazakhstan.

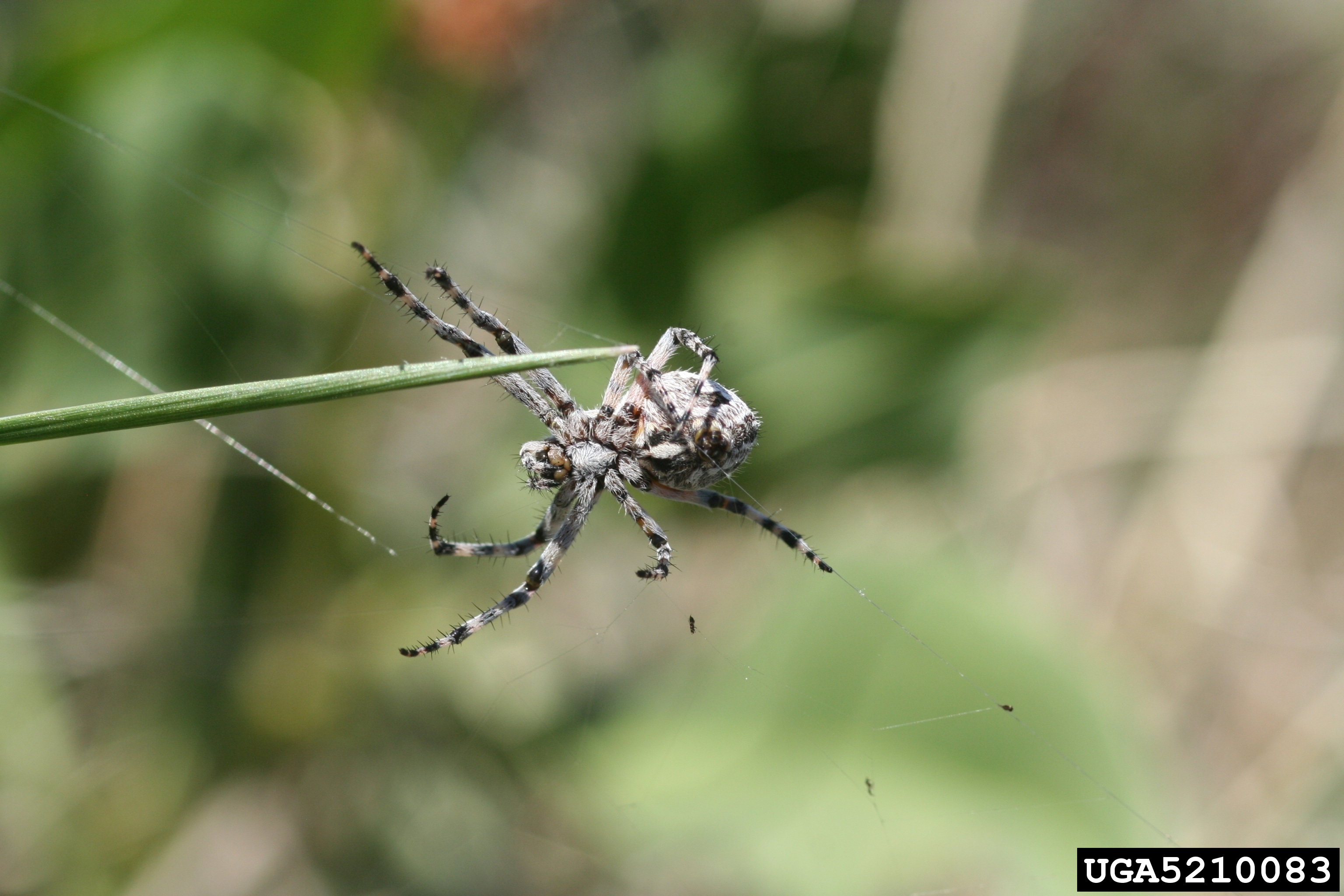
