= Hexathele ramsayi =

Conservation status
- Data Deficient (NZ TCS)

Scientific classification
- Kingdom: Animalia
- Phylum: Arthropoda
- Subphylum: Chelicerata
- Class: Arachnida
- Order: Araneae
- Infraorder: Mygalomorphae
- Family: Hexathelidae
- Genus: Hexathele
- Species: H. ramsayi

Binomial name
- Hexathele ramsayi Forster, 1968

Species of spider

Hexathele ramsayi is a species of mygalomorph spider endemic to New Zealand.

== Taxonomy ==
This species was described in 1968 by Ray Forster from male and female specimens collected in Otago. The holotype is stored in Otago Museum.

== Description ==
The male is recorded at 14.8mm in length. The carapace is reddish brown. The legs are dark red brown. The abdomen is blackish brown. The female is recorded at 22mm in length. The body colouration is identical to that of the male.

== Distribution ==
This species is only known from Kakanui Ranges in Otago, New Zealand.

== Conservation status ==
Under the New Zealand Threat Classification System, this species is listed as Data Deficient with the qualifiers of "Data Poor: Size", "Data Poor: Trend" and "One Location".
