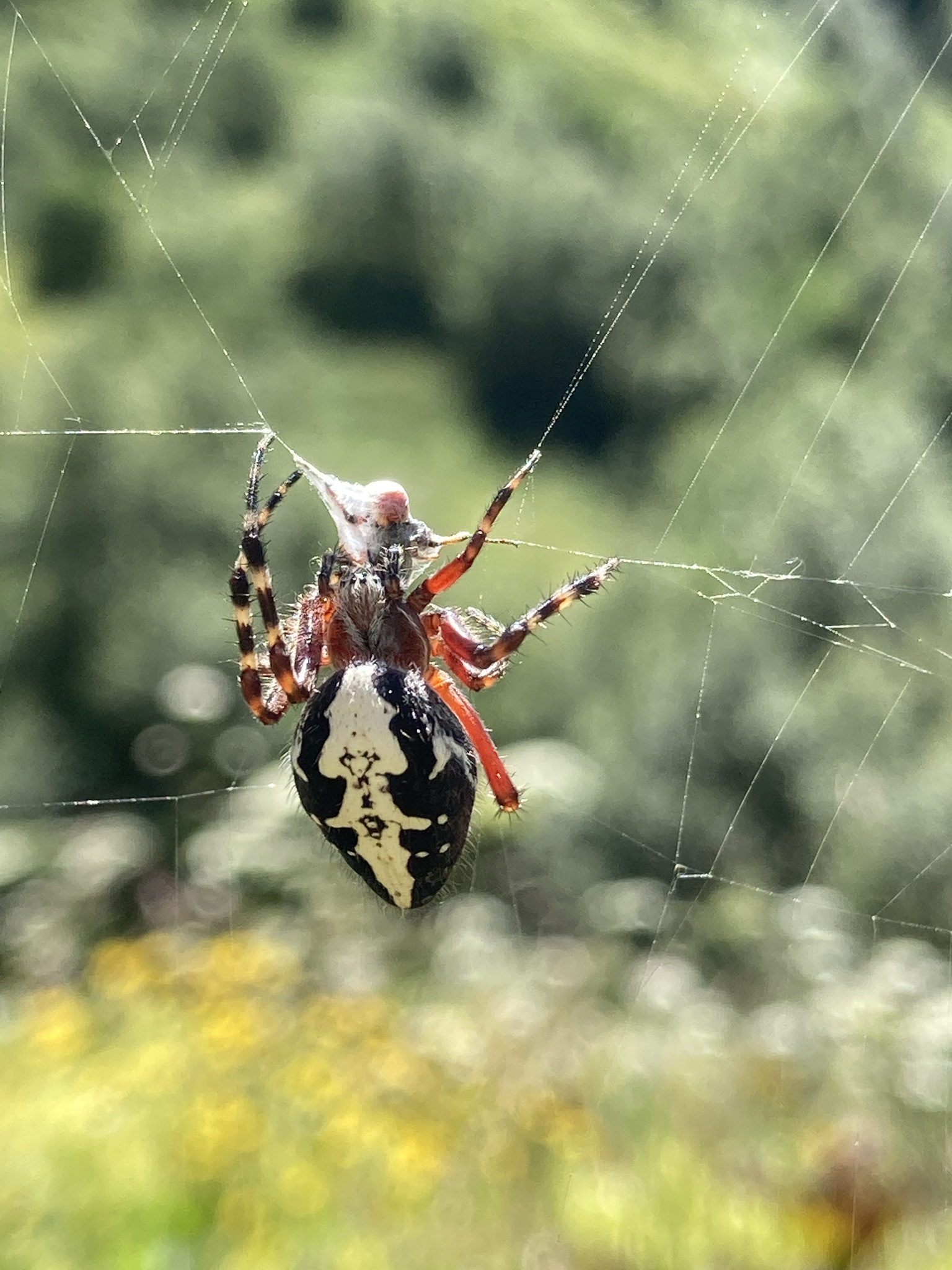
- In Russia

Scientific classification
- Kingdom: Animalia
- Phylum: Arthropoda
- Subphylum: Chelicerata
- Class: Arachnida
- Order: Araneae
- Infraorder: Araneomorphae
- Family: Araneidae
- Genus: Aculepeira
- Species: A. talishia

Binomial name
- Aculepeira talishia (Zawadsky, 1902)

= Aculepeira talishia =

Species of spider

Aculepeira talishia is an orb-weaving spider species found in Turkey, Russia, Georgia and Azerbaijan.
