= Paraembolides montisbossi =

Scientific classification
- Kingdom: Animalia
- Phylum: Arthropoda
- Subphylum: Chelicerata
- Class: Arachnida
- Order: Araneae
- Infraorder: Mygalomorphae
- Family: Hexathelidae
- Genus: Paraembolides
- Species: P. montisbossi

Binomial name
- Paraembolides montisbossi (Raven, 1978)

Synonyms
- Bymainiella montisbossi Raven, 1978

Species of spider

Paraembolides montisbossi is a species of funnel-web spider in the Hexathelidae family. It is endemic to Australia. It was described in 1978 by Australian arachnologist Robert Raven.

== Distribution and habitat ==
The species occurs in north-eastern New South Wales, in closed forest habitats. The type locality is the Mount Banda Banda Beech Reserve in the Mount Boss State Forest in the Mid North Coast region.

== Behaviour ==
The spiders are terrestrial predators that build silken tubes as shelters beneath logs.
