= Teranodes otwayensis =

Scientific classification
- Kingdom: Animalia
- Phylum: Arthropoda
- Subphylum: Chelicerata
- Class: Arachnida
- Order: Araneae
- Infraorder: Mygalomorphae
- Family: Hexathelidae
- Genus: Teranodes
- Species: T. otwayensis

Binomial name
- Teranodes otwayensis (Raven, 1978)

Synonyms
- Bymainiella otwayensis Raven, 1978

Species of spider

Teranodes otwayensis is a species of funnel-web spider in the Hexathelidae family. It is endemic to Australia. It was described in 1978 by Australian arachnologist Robert Raven.

== Distribution and habitat ==
The species occurs in Victoria, in open, wet sclerophyll forest habitats. The type locality is the Otway Range in the south-west of the state.

== Behaviour ==
The spiders are fossorial, terrestrial predators.
