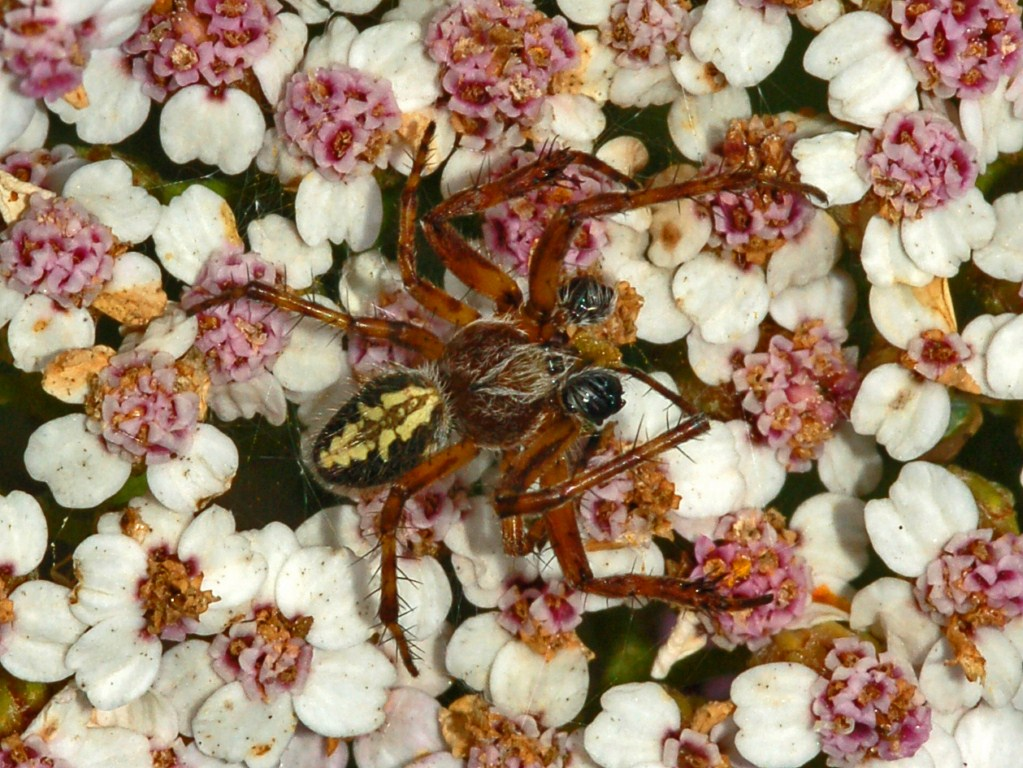
- Aculepeira ceropegia, male
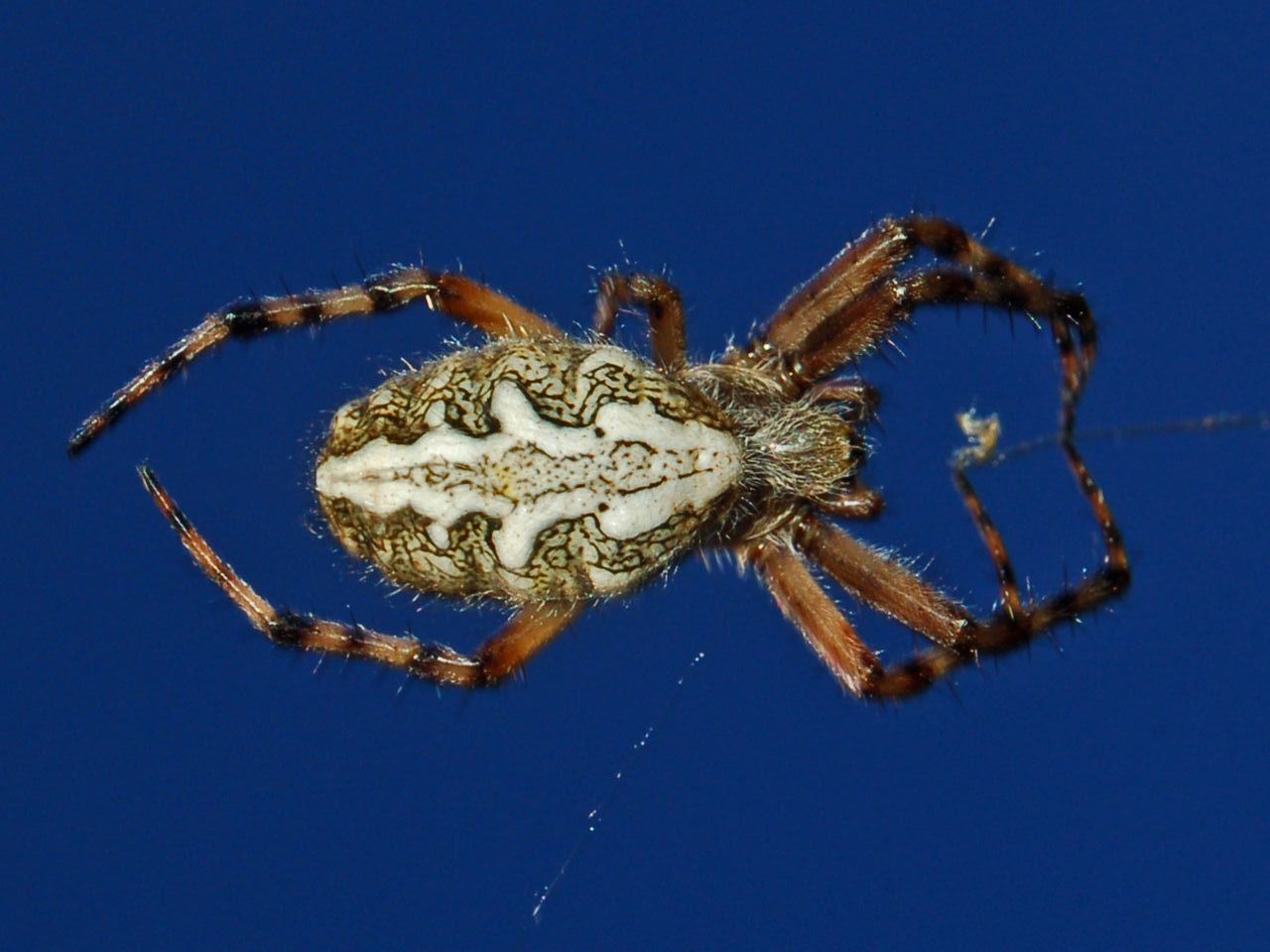
- Aculepeira ceropegia, female

Scientific classification
- Kingdom: Animalia
- Phylum: Arthropoda
- Subphylum: Chelicerata
- Class: Arachnida
- Order: Araneae
- Infraorder: Araneomorphae
- Family: Araneidae
- Genus: Aculepeira
- Species: A. ceropegia

Binomial name
- Aculepeira ceropegia (Walckenaer, 1802)

Synonyms
- Aculepeira vachoni (Karol, 1964)

= Aculepeira ceropegia =

Oak spider

Species of spider

Aculepeira ceropegia, the oak spider, is an orb-weaving spider species belonging to the family Araneidae.

== Distribution ==
This species has a Palearctic distribution. It is present in most of Europe.

== Habitat ==
This quite common species live in low bushes, wet meadows, near streams, roadsides and gardens, especially in sunny and windy areas. It can be found in mountain areas at altitudes of up to 3600 meters.

== Description ==
Aculepeira ceropegia presents a marked sexual dimorphism. These spiders can reach a length of 6–8 millimetres (0.24–0.31 in) in males, of 15–17 millimetres (0.59–0.67 in) in females. They are easy to identify due to their unique abdominal marking in the form of an oak leaf. The head is covered by a grayish-brown hairs, chelicerae are light brown and legs are dark ringed. The abdomen is elongated and oval-shaped.

== Biology ==
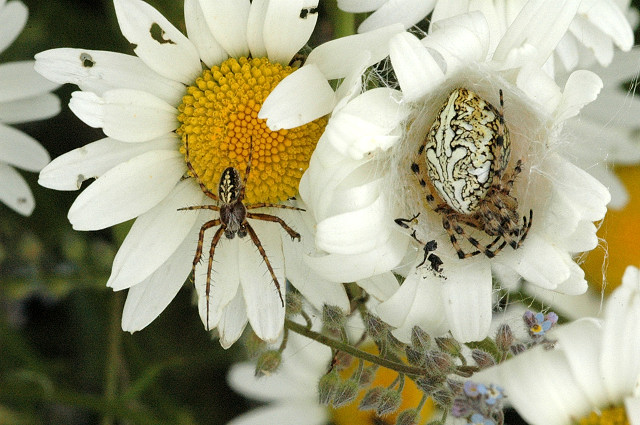
Comparison between the female (right) and the male (left)

Adults are visible from May to September. Early in the summer the oak spiders are sexually mature. Before mating, the male produces a sperm supply, that is finally transferred during mating to the female epigynum. The mating occurs during the summer, while the egg laying is done in early autumn. Eggs are usually deposited on the bark of a tree.

These orb-weaving spiders usually build a spiral vertical web close to the ground between herbaceous plants or on bushes at about 0.5–1.5 meters above ground level. They remain motionless for a long time with head down, waiting for prey. They inject venom in their victims with chelicerae. This venom paralyzes the preys and causes the external digestion with the incorporated gastric juices.

== Name ==
Ceropegia is also a genus of succulent plants with about 200 species.

== Bibliography ==
- Heiko Bellmann: Kosmos Atlas Spinnentiere Europas. 3. Aufl., 2006. Kosmos, Stuttgart. ISBN 978-3-440-10746-1
- Heimer, S. & Nentwig, W. (1991): Spinnen Mitteleuropas. - Hamburg & Berlin: Parey. ISBN 3489535340 Online-Schlüssel
- Jones D (1996): "Der Kosmos-Spinnenführer"; Franckh-Kosmos Verlags-GmbH & Co, Stuttgart, ISBN 3440061418
- Ralph Platen, Bodo von Broen, Andreas Herrmann, Ulrich M. Ratschker & Peter Sacher: Gesamtartenliste und Rote Liste der Webspinnen, Weberknechte und Pseudoskorpione des Landes Brandenburg (Arachnida: Araneae, Opiliones, Pseudoscorpiones) mit Angaben zur Häufigkeit und Ökologie. Naturschutz und Landschaftspflege in Brandenburg 8, Heft 2 (Beilage); 1999.
- Roberts, M.J. (1995): Collins Field Guide: Spiders of Britain & Northern Europe. - Bath: Ramsbury. ISBN 0-00-219981-5
