= Bymainiella =

Scientific classification
- Kingdom: Animalia
- Phylum: Arthropoda
- Subphylum: Chelicerata
- Class: Arachnida
- Order: Araneae
- Infraorder: Mygalomorphae
- Family: Hexathelidae
- Genus: Bymainiella; Raven, 1978

Type species
- B. terraereginae (Raven, 1976)

Species
- 4, see text

Genus of spiders

Bymainiella is a genus of Australian funnel-web spiders that was first described by R. J. Raven in 1978. This genus is named in honour of the Australian arachnologist Barbara York Main.

== Species ==
As of May 2019 it contains four species:

- Bymainiella lugubris Raven, 1978 – Australia (New South Wales)
- Bymainiella monteithi Raven, 1978 – Australia (Queensland, New South Wales)
- Bymainiella polesoni Raven, 1978 – Australia (New South Wales)
- Bymainiella terraereginae (Raven, 1976) (type) – Australia (Queensland, New South Wales)
