= Bymainiella terraereginae =

Scientific classification
- Kingdom: Animalia
- Phylum: Arthropoda
- Subphylum: Chelicerata
- Class: Arachnida
- Order: Araneae
- Infraorder: Mygalomorphae
- Family: Hexathelidae
- Genus: Bymainiella
- Species: B. terraereginae

Binomial name
- Bymainiella terraereginae Raven, 1976

Species of spider

Bymainiella terraereginae is a species of funnel-web spider in the Hexathelidae family. It is endemic to Australia. It was described in 1976 by Australian arachnologist Robert Raven.

== Distribution and habitat ==
The species occurs in south-eastern Queensland. The type locality is the Lamington Plateau.

== Behaviour ==
The spiders are terrestrial predators that build silken tube retreats beneath rocks and logs.
