= Bymainiella lugubris =

Scientific classification
- Kingdom: Animalia
- Phylum: Arthropoda
- Subphylum: Chelicerata
- Class: Arachnida
- Order: Araneae
- Infraorder: Mygalomorphae
- Family: Hexathelidae
- Genus: Bymainiella
- Species: B. lugubris

Binomial name
- Bymainiella lugubris Raven, 1978

Species of spider

Bymainiella lugubris is a species of funnel-web spider in the Hexathelidae family. It is endemic to Australia. It was described in 1978 by Australian arachnologist Robert Raven.

== Distribution and habitat ==
The species occurs in New South Wales in alpine, snow gum woodland and open sclerophyll forest habitats. The type locality is the New England Plateau.

== Behaviour ==
The spiders are terrestrial predators that build ground webs.
