= Bymainiella polesoni =

Scientific classification
- Kingdom: Animalia
- Phylum: Arthropoda
- Subphylum: Chelicerata
- Class: Arachnida
- Order: Araneae
- Infraorder: Mygalomorphae
- Family: Hexathelidae
- Genus: Bymainiella
- Species: B. polesoni

Binomial name
- Bymainiella polesoni Raven, 1978

Species of spider

Bymainiella polesoni is a species of funnel-web spider in the Hexathelidae family. It is endemic to Australia. It was described in 1978 by Australian arachnologist Robert Raven.

== Distribution and habitat ==
The species occurs in New South Wales in closed forest habitats. The type locality is Mount Boss, in the New England National Park, near Dorrigo.

== Behaviour ==
The spiders are terrestrial predators.
