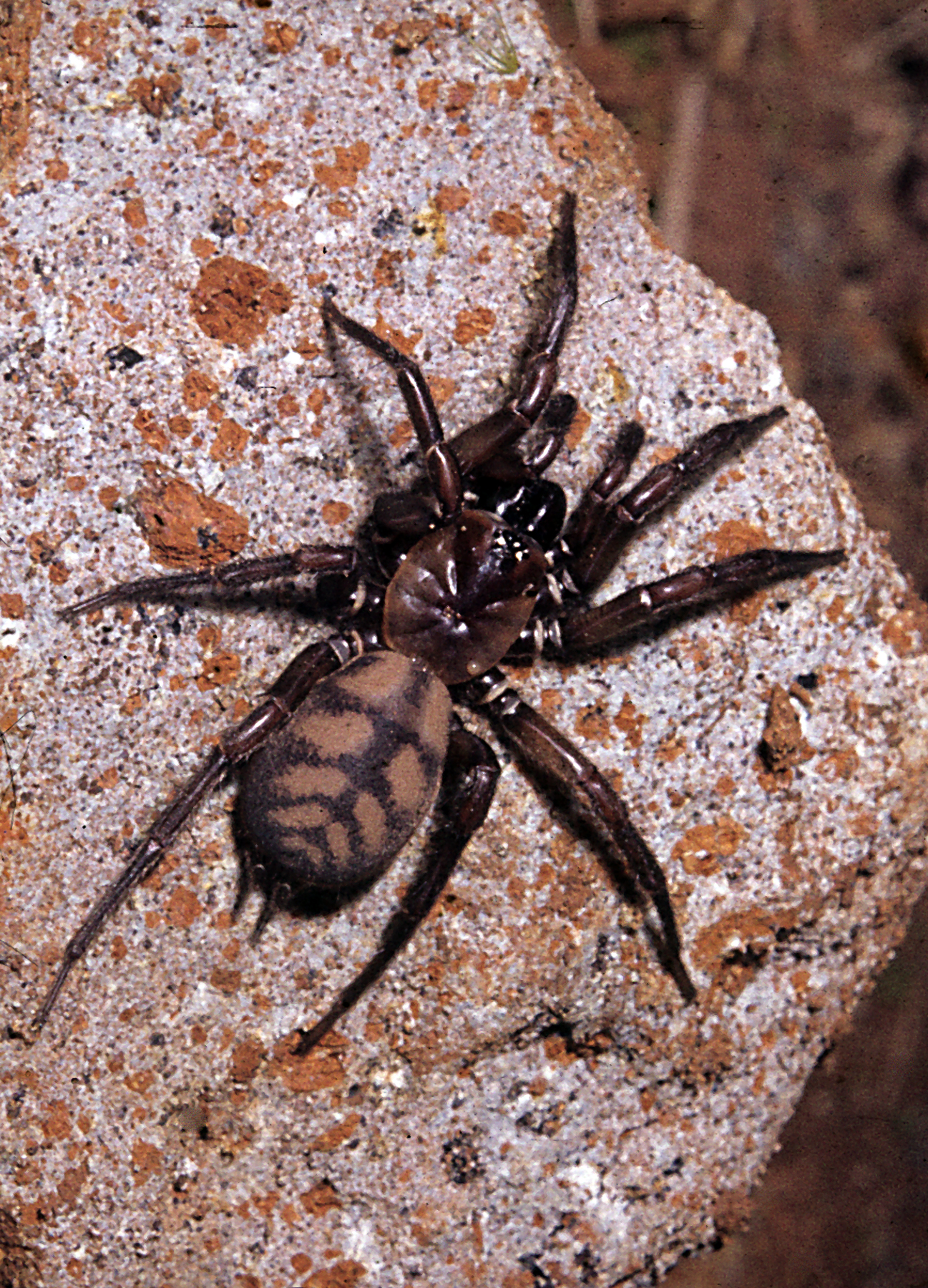
- Female

Conservation status
- Not Threatened (NZ TCS)

Scientific classification
- Kingdom: Animalia
- Phylum: Arthropoda
- Subphylum: Chelicerata
- Class: Arachnida
- Order: Araneae
- Infraorder: Mygalomorphae
- Family: Hexathelidae
- Genus: Hexathele
- Species: H. hochstetteri

Binomial name
- Hexathele hochstetteri Ausserer, 1871

= Hexathele hochstetteri =

Banded tunnelweb spider

Banded tunnelweb spider from New Zealand

Hexathele hochstetteri, commonly known as the banded tunnelweb spider, is a spider in the family Hexathelidae, found only in New Zealand. It is common in the North Island, and uncommon in the South Island.

== Description ==
The banded tunnelweb spider (Hexathele hochstetteri) is among New Zealand's largest spiders, growing up to 20 mm in body length, and is endemic to New Zealand. The easiest way to distinguish a banded tunnelweb spider is to look for the chevron design on its abdomen. The chevron pattern is described as being yellowish, whilst the rest of the abdomen is a darker brown colour. They also have an orange-brown carapace, and six spinnerets. It is these six spinnerets that ultimately distinguish Hexathele hochstetteri from other genera of Hexathelidae, such as Porrhothele, as they only have four spinnerets. Female banded tunnelweb spider eyes occupy around half their head space, whereas males differ, having slightly smaller lateral eyes.

Banded tunnelweb spiders are part of the infraorder Mygalomorphae. Mygalomorphs are a relatively ancient kind of spider that have downward pointing fangs, which have been compared to pick axes. When biting, a tunnelweb spider will press down with these fangs rather than pince together laterally, a trait that is helpful when identifying the spider.

== Taxonomy ==
Hexethele hochstetteri was first was described by the Austrian arachnologist Anton Ausserer in 1871, and placed in his newly created genus Hexethele. The specific epithet hochstetteri honours Ferdinand von Hochstetter, who brought a specimen back to Austria from New Zealand as part of the Novara expedition.

== Distribution and habitat ==
The banded tunnelweb spider is endemic to New Zealand. Two genera of hexathelids are found in New Zealand, Hexathele and Porrhothele.

Tunnel-dwelling spiders are found throughout New Zealand in a range of habitats including the coastlines, bushlines and mountainous areas. Specifically, the banded tunnelweb spider is most common in the upper north island of New Zealand, although they are also sometimes found further south. Other closely related species of Hexathelidae are found further south, but the banded tunnelweb spider is most common in the upper north island of New Zealand.

=== Habitat preferences ===
Banded tunnelweb spiders are often found on and under rocks and logs, but are predominantly found in small holes in tree trunks and rocks in which they build a silk tunnel. It is in these holes that they sit and wait for prey to move past the entrance, quickly striking at the opportunity for a meal. They are rarely seen outside these holes, and it is rare to see a female roaming about unless it is moving from one hole to another. Males can be seen roaming around when they are searching for a mate.

== Life cycle ==
Little is known about the mating habits and reproductive timing of the banded tunnelweb spider, as it has proven difficult to observe them mating inside their silk tunnel constructs. It is assumed that mating takes place inside the burrow of the female spider, although there are no reported sightings of the actual mating taking place. The actual mating of the spiders is assumed to happen in the same fashion as it does with other closely related mygalomorphs. There has been one recorded sighting of the behaviours leading up to mating, although the actual mating was unsuccessful; it was observed that as the male approached the female's burrow he outstretched his front pair of legs, exposing his reproductive organs, then whilst vibrating his outstretched legs he moved toward the female. In this instance the female was unresponsive to the male's advances, and nothing eventuated from the encounter. When a female is impregnated she lays her eggs in early to mid summer, wrapping them in a loose silk egg sack that is stored near the entrance of her burrow. In approximately thirty days the spiderlings hatch and stay nearby in the mother's web before leaving to construct their own silky tunnel web close by. There is a lack of information on the actual lifespan of the spiders, although the lifespan of the males and females differ greatly. Once leaving their mother the males only have a matter of months to find a mate before they die, but females have been known to live up to six years in captivity, being able to moult their skin and reproduce multiple times.

== Diet and foraging ==
Banded tunnelweb spiders are known to eat most types of small insects, waiting in the tunnel that they have constructed for prey to walk past the opening. At the entrance to their tunnel, they construct a swathe of silk, which serves as an indicator to when prey is moving past. Once an insect is captured it is dragged into the tunnel. From inspecting the remains found in their dwellings it has been observed that their diet consists mainly of beetles, millipedes and slaters, although they will attack and eat most arthropods. They have also been known to eat snails. Despite the armored defenses of a snail the banded tunnelweb spider are able to bite and drag them into their tunnels.

== Predators, parasites, and diseases ==
As the banded tunnelweb spider is a relatively undocumented species, there is little to no information on the parasite species that live on the banded tunnelweb spider and the family Hexathelidae. It is known that rodents sometimes eat hexathelid spiders, although this is rare due to their sometimes painful bite. They are also hard to catch as they are usually very reclusive and will retreat inside their burrow at any sign of movement.

== Conservation status ==
Under the New Zealand Threat Classification System, this species is listed as "Not Threatened".

== Other information ==
The banded tunnelweb spider is not dangerous to humans, although its bite can be painful; its venom does not affect people and will only cause some soreness and inflammation. Although large in size, the banded tunnelweb spider is extremely shy. Male banded tunnelweb spiders are sometimes found in sinks and bathtubs, as they may wander inside a home in search for a mate, fall in and become trapped. It is during this time when males are searching for a mate that they are most commonly seen. Although the bite from the banded tunnelweb spider does not cause any severe health complications for humans, it is very closely related to the Australian funnelweb spider, which can be dangerous. Throughout the world there are 85 known species of tunnelweb spider, 25 of those are found in New Zealand.
