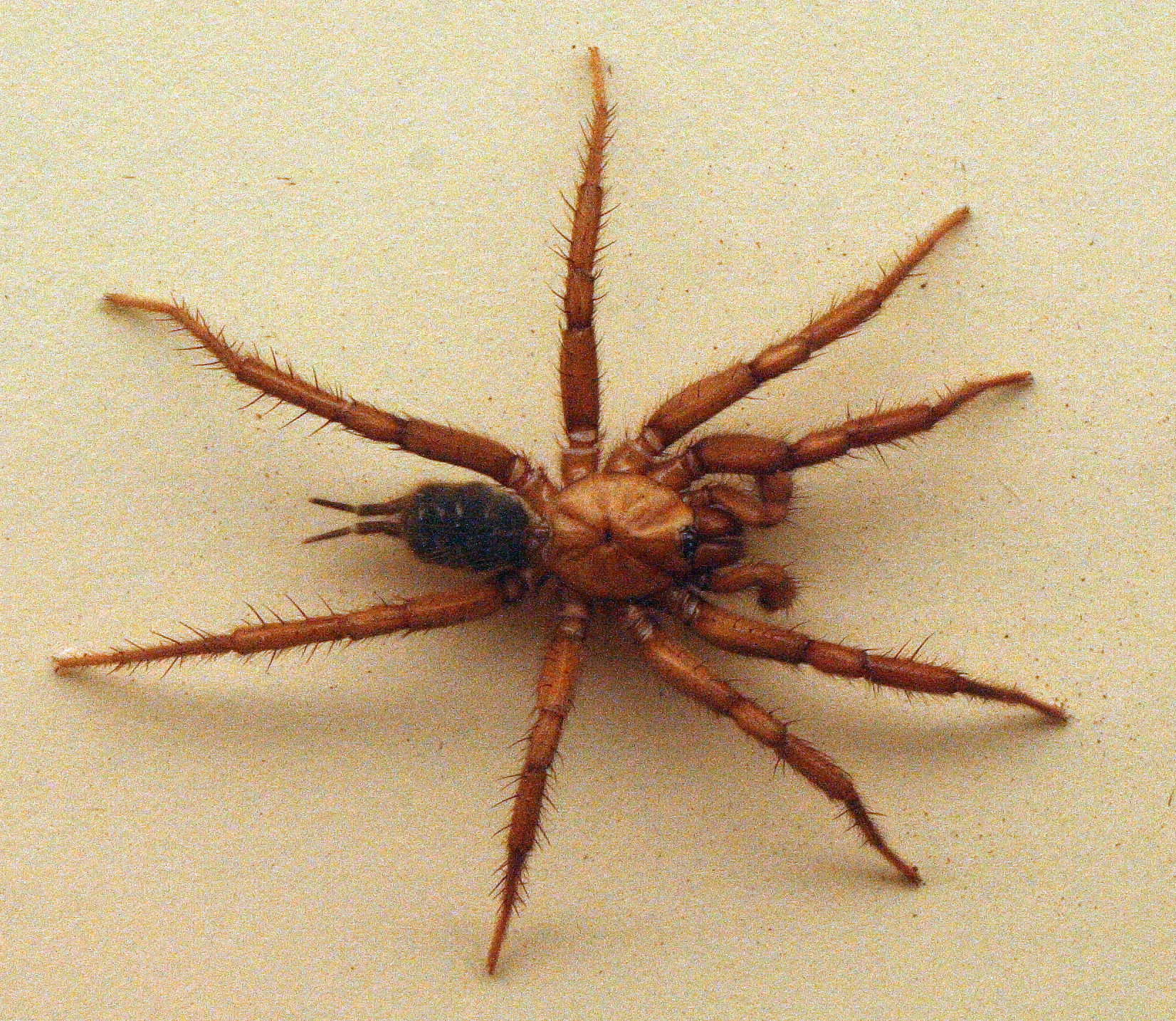
- Paraembolides variabilis

Scientific classification
- Kingdom: Animalia
- Phylum: Arthropoda
- Subphylum: Chelicerata
- Class: Arachnida
- Order: Araneae
- Infraorder: Mygalomorphae
- Family: Hexathelidae
- Genus: Paraembolides; Raven, 1980

Type species
- P. boycei (Raven, 1978)

Species
- 8, see text

= Paraembolides =

Genus of spiders

Paraembolides is a genus of Australian funnel-web spiders that was first described by Robert John Raven in 1980.

== Species ==
As of May 2019 it contains eight species:

- Paraembolides boycei (Raven, 1978) (type) – Australia (Queensland)
- Paraembolides boydi (Raven, 1978) – Australia (New South Wales)
- Paraembolides brindabella (Raven, 1978) – Australia (New South Wales, Australian Capital Territory)
- Paraembolides cannoni (Raven, 1978) – Australia (Queensland)
- Paraembolides grayi (Raven, 1978) – Australia (New South Wales)
- Paraembolides montisbossi (Raven, 1978) – Australia (New South Wales)
- Paraembolides tubrabucca (Raven, 1978) – Australia (New South Wales)
- Paraembolides variabilis (Raven, 1978) – Australia (New South Wales)
