= Scotinoecus =

Scientific classification
- Kingdom: Animalia
- Phylum: Arthropoda
- Subphylum: Chelicerata
- Class: Arachnida
- Order: Araneae
- Infraorder: Mygalomorphae
- Family: Hexathelidae
- Genus: Scotinoecus; Simon, 1892

Type species
- S. cinereopilosus (Simon, 1889)

Species
- 4, see text

Genus of spiders

Scotinoecus is a genus of South American funnel-web spiders that was first described by Eugène Louis Simon in 1892. Originally placed with the curtain web spiders, it was moved to the Hexathelidae in 1980.

== Species ==
As of May 2019 it contains four species:

- Scotinoecus cinereopilosus (Simon, 1889) (type) – Chile
- Scotinoecus fasciatus Tullgren, 1901 – Chile, Argentina
- Scotinoecus major Ríos-Tamayo & Goloboff, 2012 – Chile
- Scotinoecus ruiles Ríos-Tamayo & Goloboff, 2012 – Chile
