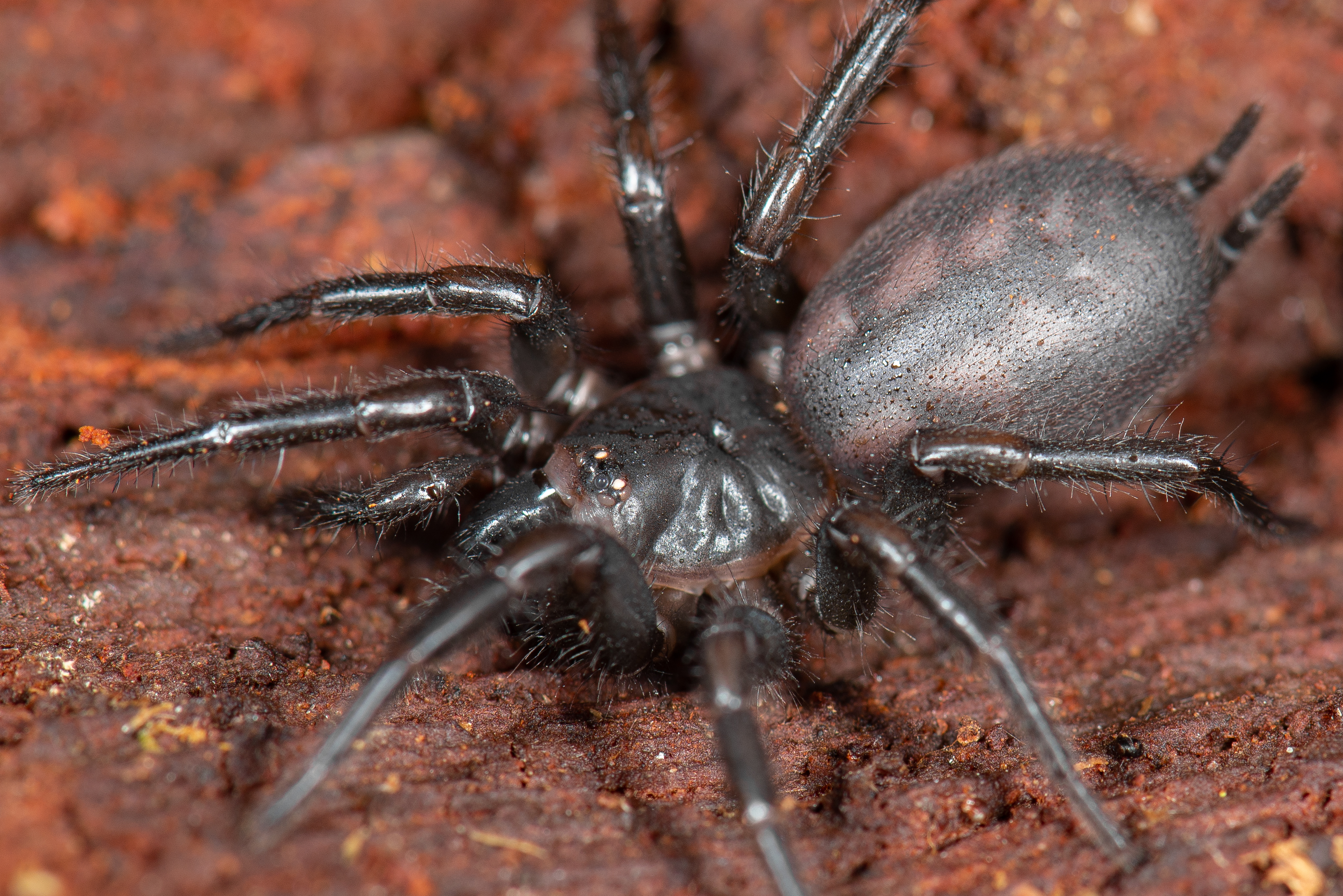
- Teranodes montanus

Scientific classification
- Kingdom: Animalia
- Phylum: Arthropoda
- Subphylum: Chelicerata
- Class: Arachnida
- Order: Araneae
- Infraorder: Mygalomorphae
- Family: Hexathelidae
- Genus: Teranodes; Raven, 1985

Type species
- T. montanus (Hickman, 1927)

Species
- T. montanus (Hickman, 1927) – Australia (Tasmania, Victoria); T. otwayensis (Raven, 1978) – Australia (Victoria)

= Teranodes =

Genus of spiders

Teranodes is a genus of Australian funnel-web spiders that was first described by Robert John Raven in 1985. As of May 2019 it contains only two species: T. montanus and T. otwayensis. It was originally given the name "Terania", but it was later changed to "Teranodes" when it was discovered that the name was already in use for a genus of shield bugs.
