= Mediothele =

Scientific classification
- Kingdom: Animalia
- Phylum: Arthropoda
- Subphylum: Chelicerata
- Class: Arachnida
- Order: Araneae
- Infraorder: Mygalomorphae
- Family: Hexathelidae
- Genus: Mediothele; Raven & Platnick, 1978

Type species
- M. australis Raven & Platnick, 1978

Species
- 6, see text

Genus of spiders

Mediothele is a genus of South American funnel-web spiders that was first described by Robert John Raven & Norman I. Platnick in 1978.

== Species ==
As of May 2024 it contains six species, all found in Chile:

- Mediothele anae Ríos-Tamayo & Goloboff, 2012 – Chile
- Mediothele australis Raven & Platnick, 1978 (type) – Chile
- Mediothele lagos Ríos-Tamayo & Goloboff, 2012 – Chile
- Mediothele linares Ríos-Tamayo & Goloboff, 2012 – Chile
- Mediothele minima Ríos-Tamayo & Goloboff, 2012 – Chile
- Mediothele nahuelbuta Ríos-Tamayo & Goloboff, 2012 – Chile
