= Plesiothele =

Scientific classification
- Domain: Eukaryota
- Kingdom: Animalia
- Phylum: Arthropoda
- Subphylum: Chelicerata
- Class: Arachnida
- Order: Araneae
- Infraorder: Mygalomorphae
- Family: Hexathelidae
- Genus: Plesiothele; Raven, 1978
- Species: P. fentoni

Binomial name
- Plesiothele fentoni (Hickman, 1936)

Synonyms
- Hexathele fentoni Hickman, 1936

Genus of spiders

Plesiothele is a monotypic genus of Australian funnel-web spiders containing the single species, Plesiothele fentoni, also known as Lake Fenton trapdoor spider. The genus was first described by Robert John Raven in 1978, and has only been found in Tasmania, Australia. Originally placed with the curtain web spiders, it was moved to the Hexathelidae in 1980.

Plesiothele fentoni is a ground-dwelling spider that lives in lidless, silk-lined burrows some 5 cm (2.0 in) deep. It grows to 15 mm (0.6 in) in length. The abdomen is yellow-brown and strongly patterned.
