= Anton Ausserer =

Austrian naturalist specialising in spiders

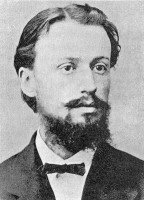
- Born: 5 July 1843; Bozen, Austria
- Died: 20 July 1889 (aged 46); Graz, Austria
- Scientific career
- Fields: Entomology, Arachnology

Anton Ausserer (5 July 1843 – 20 July 1889) was an Austrian naturalist specialising in spiders. His father died when he was a youth, and he and his family suffered much economic hardship, but he was supported and encouraged by Camill Heller, professor of Zoology and Comparative Anatomy at the University of Innsbruck.

== Life and career ==
Anton Ausserer was one of five children of a gunsmith in Bozen (Bolzano), Tyrol). His teachers noticed his talent at a young age, so they encouraged his father to send him to the Franciscan high school. There he had Vincenz Maria Gredler, a pioneer of zoological research in Tyrol, as his teacher. Already at this time he showed a great interest in science. At the age of 15 he became an orphan. During high school and university he had to struggle with bitter economic hardship and had to earn his living by tutoring. During this time he contracted a lung disease that was to trouble him for the rest of his life. He studied natural sciences while occupying a teaching post in Innsbruck from 1863 to 1867 and was supported there by Camill Heller, professor of Zoology and Comparative Anatomy at the University of Innsbruck. Heller inspired him to research spiders. In his second year of university in 1865, Ausserer received a university award and a scholarship that made it easier for him to continue his studies. His diploma thesis in 1867, under Heller, was on the spider fauna of Tyrol.

From 1868 he worked as a high school teacher in Feldkirch, and later taught at the 1st State High School in Graz. In 1869 he became secretary of the zoological section of the Natural Science Society of Innsbruck. In 1870/1871 he took leave of absence for a research semester in Vienna. He studied with Ludwig Karl Schmarda and did research at the "k. k. zoological Hofcabinete", the forerunner of the Natural History Museum, Vienna. As a result, Ausserer published his pioneering work on the systematics of othognathic spiders (tarantula-like species) as well as a work on the webspinning spider Aculepeira ceropegia (1871). In 1872 he obtained his doctorate in Innsbruck. In 1875 he wrote a continuation of his work on the orthognathic spiders. From 1880 to 1881 he travelled to Sicily, and from 1886 to 1887 to Egypt. Ausserer married in 1888, but died of lung disease in Graz in 1889 at the age of 46; he was buried in Trautmannsdorf (Eastern Styria).

Ausserer made an important contribution to arachnology by proposing a new taxonomic classification of the spider family Theraphosidae. He described 38 new species of tarantula.

== Selected publications ==
- 1867. "Die Arachniden Tirols nach ihrer horizontalen und verticalen Verbreitung, 1." Verhandlungen der kaiserlich-königlichen zoologisch-botanischen Gesellschaft. Wien, 17:137–170.
- 1871. "Beiträge zur Kenntniss der Arachniden-Familie der Territelariae Thorell (Mygalidae Autor)". Verhandlungen der kaiserlich-königlichen zoologisch-botanischen Gesellschaft. Wien, 21:184-187.
- 1875. "Zweiter Beitrag zur Kenntnis der Arachniden-Familie der Territelariae Thorell (Mygalidae Autor)". Verhandlungen der kaiserlich-königlichen zoologisch-botanischen Gesellschaft. Wien, 25:125-206.
