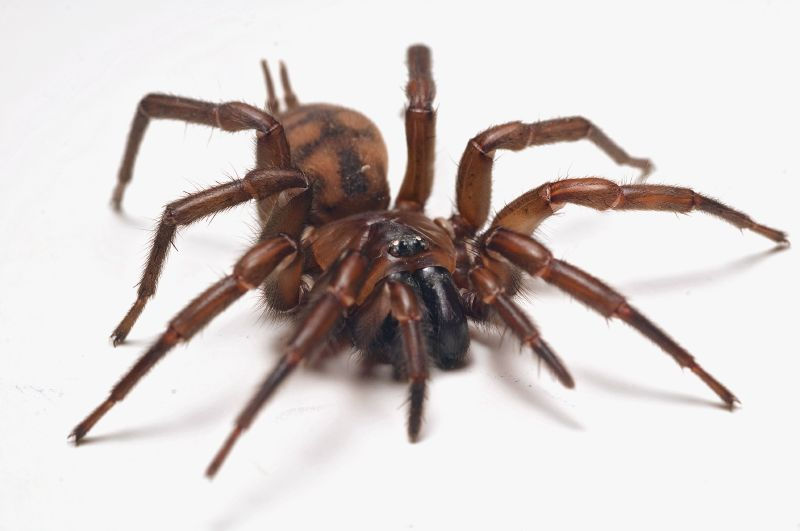
- Hexathele hochstetteri, female

Scientific classification
- Kingdom: Animalia
- Phylum: Arthropoda
- Subphylum: Chelicerata
- Class: Arachnida
- Order: Araneae
- Infraorder: Mygalomorphae
- Clade: Avicularioidea
- Family: Hexathelidae; Simon, 1892

Diversity
- 7 genera, 45 species
- blue: reported countries (WSC)

= Hexathelidae =

funnel-web spiders Temporal range: Triassic–present

Family of spiders

Hexathelidae is a family of mygalomorph spiders. It is one of a number of families and genera of spiders known as tunnelweb or funnel-web spiders. In 2018, the family was substantially reduced in size by genera being moved to three separate families: Atracidae, Macrothelidae and Porrhothelidae.

== Description ==
These spiders are medium to large in size, with body lengths ranging from 1 to 5 cm (0.5 to 2 in). The body is typically three times longer than it is wide. They are darkly colored, ranging from black to brown, with a glossy carapace covering the front part of the body. Like the related diplurid spiders, the hexathelids have generally long spinnerets.

Their moderately long posterior spinnerets and other features make the Hexathelidae appear similar to the Dipluridae, and were considered a subfamily of the latter until 1980.

Like other Mygalomorphae (also called the Orthognatha, an infraorder of spiders which includes the true tarantulas), these spiders have fangs which point straight down and do not cross each other (see also Araneomorphae). They have ample venom glands that lie entirely within their chelicerae. Their chelicerae and fangs are large and powerful.

== Taxonomy ==
A molecular phylogenetic study in 2018 showed that Hexathelidae, as then circumscribed, was not monophyletic and hence split off genera into the new families Atracidae, Macrothelidae and Porrhothelidae. The following cladogram shows the relationships found between these families (former Hexathelidae families marked with boxes).

- - Dipluridae
  - - Hexathelidae
    - - Porrhothelidae
      - - Macrothelidae
        - - - Atracidae
            - Actinopodidae
          - - Calisoga (Nemesiidae)
            - Hebestatis (Halonoproctidae)

=== Genera ===
As of July 2026, this family includes seven genera and 45 species:

- Bymainiella Raven, 1978 – Australia
- Hexathele Ausserer, 1871 – New Zealand
- Mediothele Raven & Platnick, 1978 – Chile
- Paraembolides Raven, 1980 – Australia
- Plesiothele Raven, 1978 – Australia
- Scotinoecus Simon, 1892 – Argentina, Chile
- Teranodes Raven, 1985 – Australia

=== Formerly placed here ===
As of May 2018, some genera formerly placed in Hexathelidae have been moved to other families:

- Former subfamily Atracinae, now in Atracidae

- Atrax O. P-Cambridge, 1877 — Australia
- Hadronyche L. Koch, 1873 — Australia
- Illawarra Gray, 2010 — Australia

- Now in Macrothelidae

- Macrothele Ausserer, 1871 — Africa, Europe, Asia

- Now in Porrhothelidae

- Porrhothele Simon, 1892 — New Zealand

== Distribution and habitat ==
Five of the seven genera are found in Australia and New Zealand. Two genera are from Argentina and Chile in South America.

Hexathelids typically live in burrows, which are constructed in the ground or in tree hollows. An elaborately constructed burrow entrance is common. These spiders construct a funnel-shaped web and lurk for prey in the small end of the funnel. They frequently search for a place to nest under human dwellings, or under nearby rocks, logs, or other similar objects. They are most active at night. Some build in rain forests, both in the soil and in hollows on trees; others build entirely in sand, e.g., Fraser Island, southeastern Queensland. In Australia, these spiders tend to prefer cooler climates, hence they are found primarily in rain forests.
