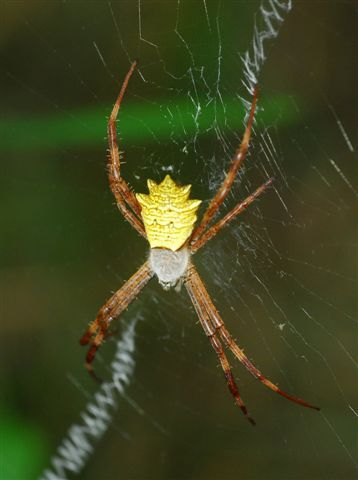
- female
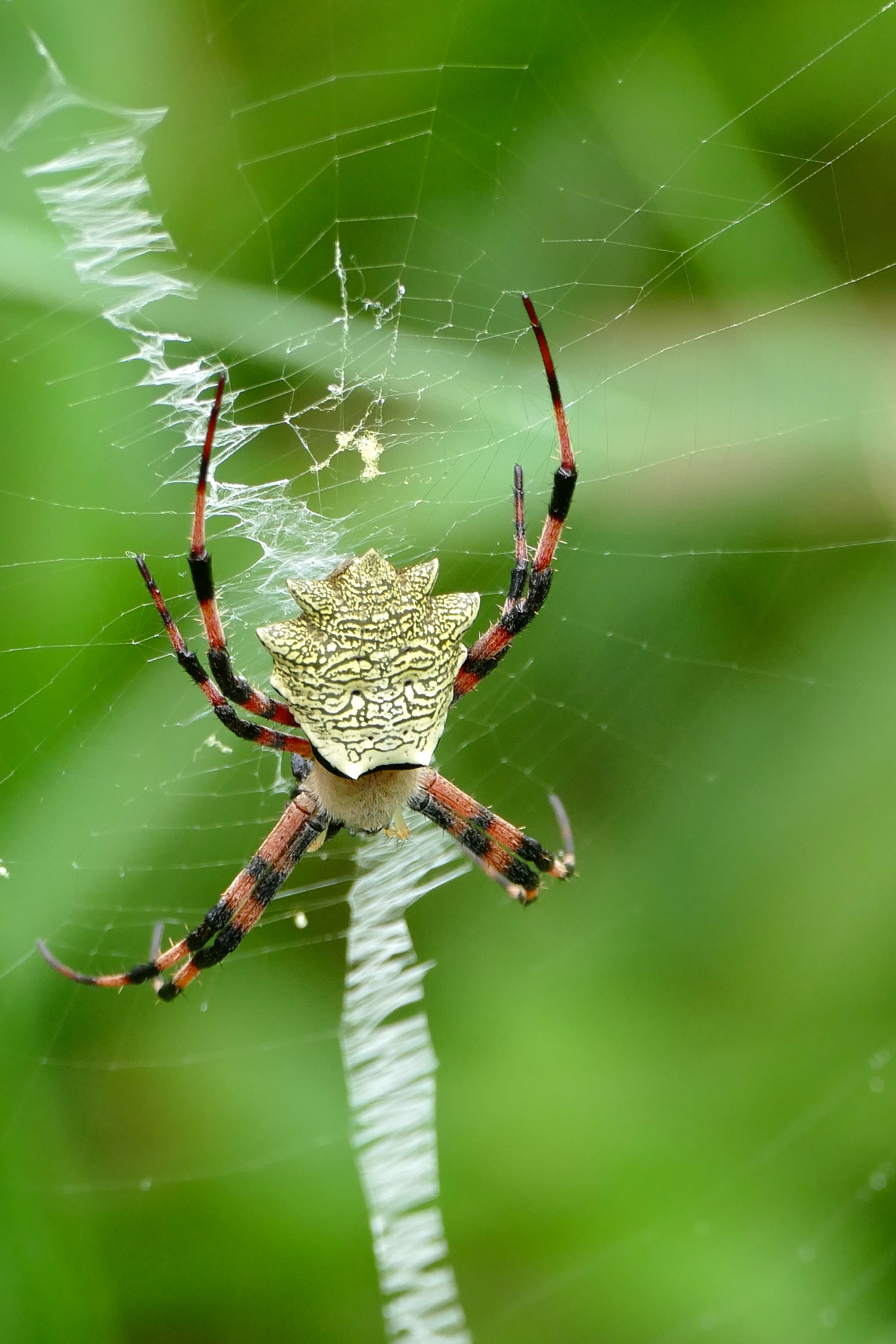
- female

Scientific classification
- Kingdom: Animalia
- Phylum: Arthropoda
- Subphylum: Chelicerata
- Class: Arachnida
- Order: Araneae
- Infraorder: Araneomorphae
- Family: Araneidae
- Genus: Argiope
- Species: A. flavipalpis

Binomial name
- Argiope flavipalpis (Lucas, 1858)

Synonyms
- Epeira flavipalpis Lucas, 1858; Argiope cuspidata Thorell, 1859; Argiope pechuelii Karsch, 1879; Argiope pechueli preussi Strand, 1906

= Argiope flavipalpis =

Banded Argiope Spider

Species of spider

Argiope flavipalpis is a species of spider in the family Araneidae, found in Africa and Yemen. It is commonly known as the banded argiope spider.

== Distribution ==
Argiope flavipalpis is known from throughout Central, East, and Southern Africa, as well as Cape Verde Island. In South Africa, the species is known from three provinces at elevations ranging from 47 to 1,077 m above sea level.

== Habitat and ecology ==
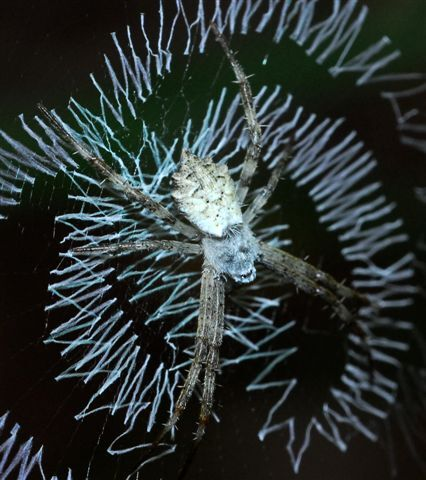
juvenile female

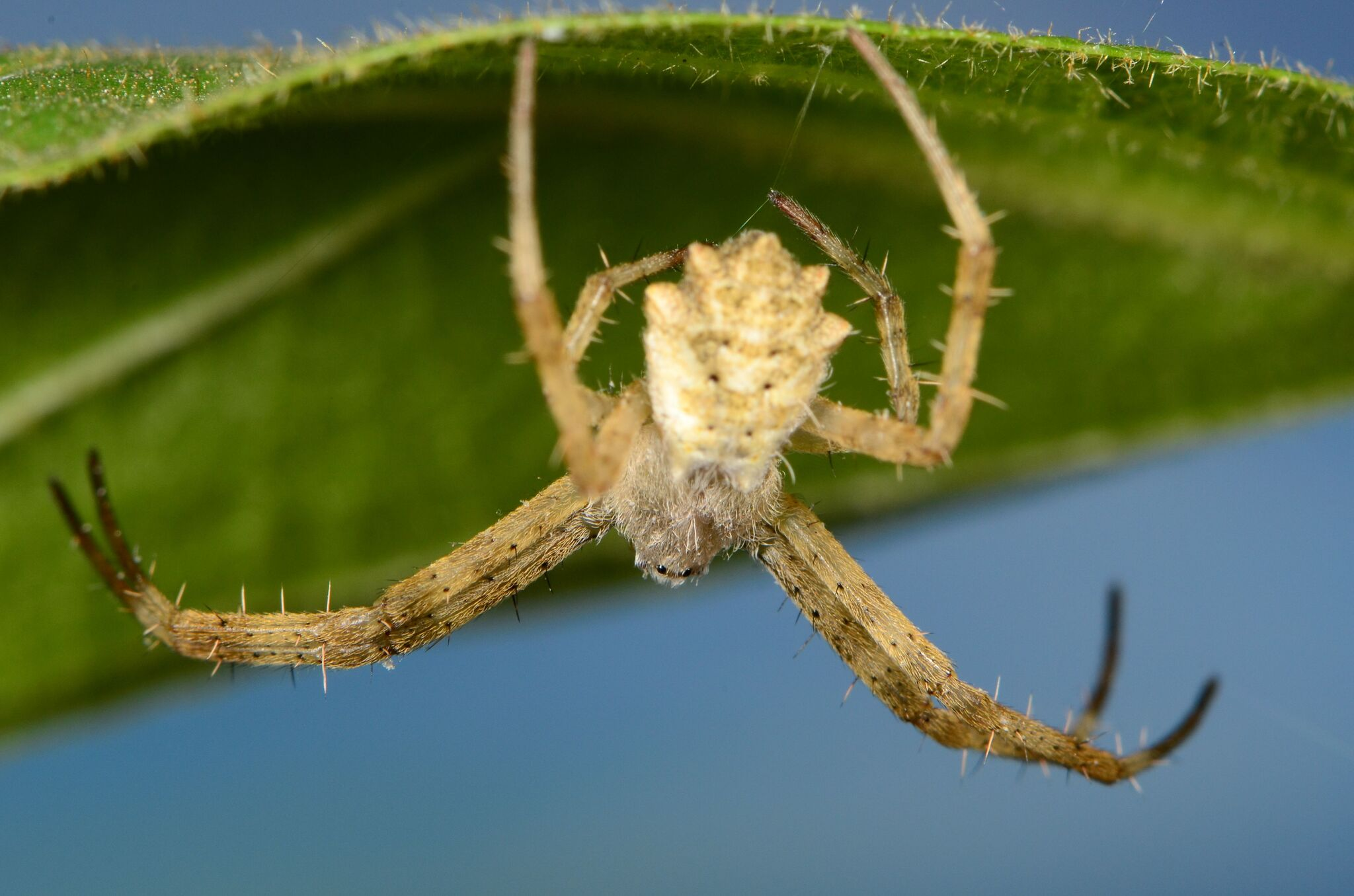
juvenile female

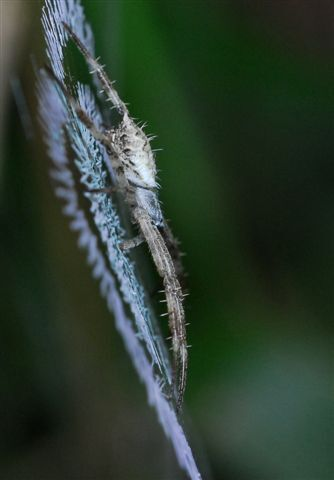
juvenile female

The species constructs orb webs in open grassland areas and gardens. The webs are usually placed low in shrubby vegetation sturdy enough to bear their weight. The spider hangs at the hub head-down throughout the day. Observations in Durban showed the species spins new webs daily with the stabilimentum shape differing each day. The species has been observed to move with great speed from front to back of the web through a small slit. The species inhabits Forest and Savanna biomes.

== Description ==
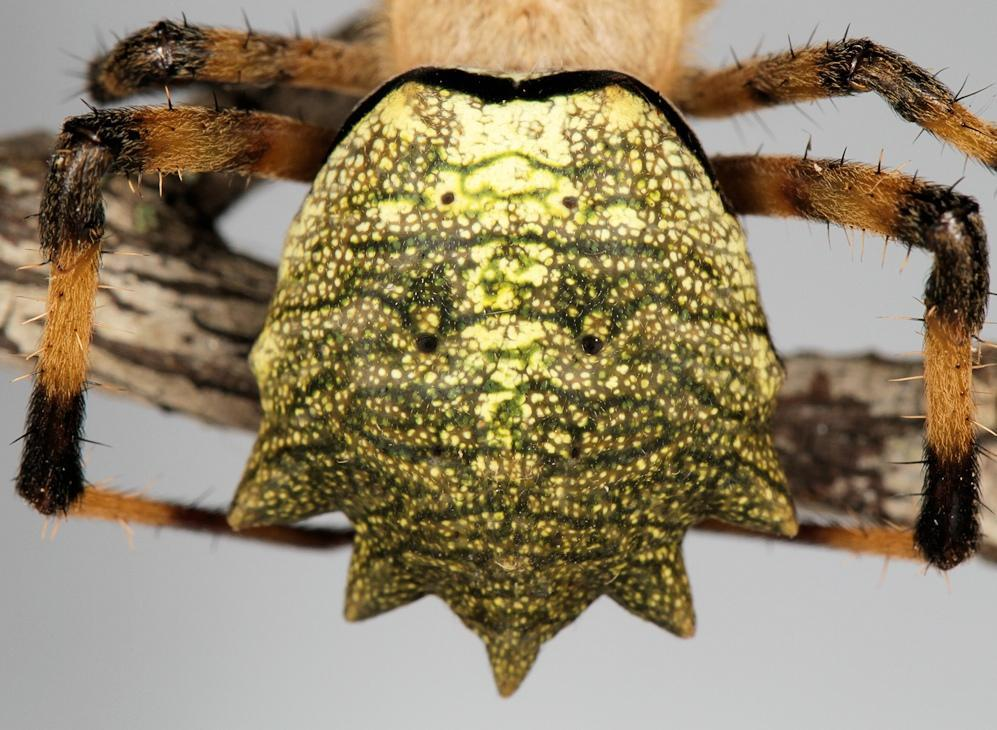

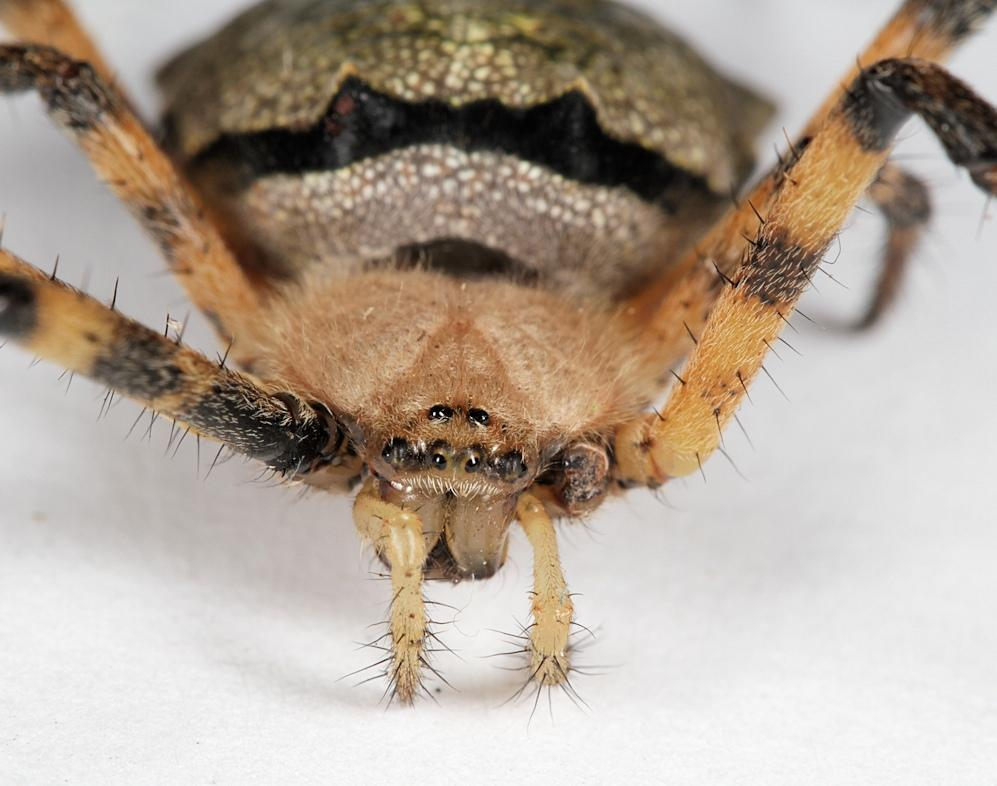

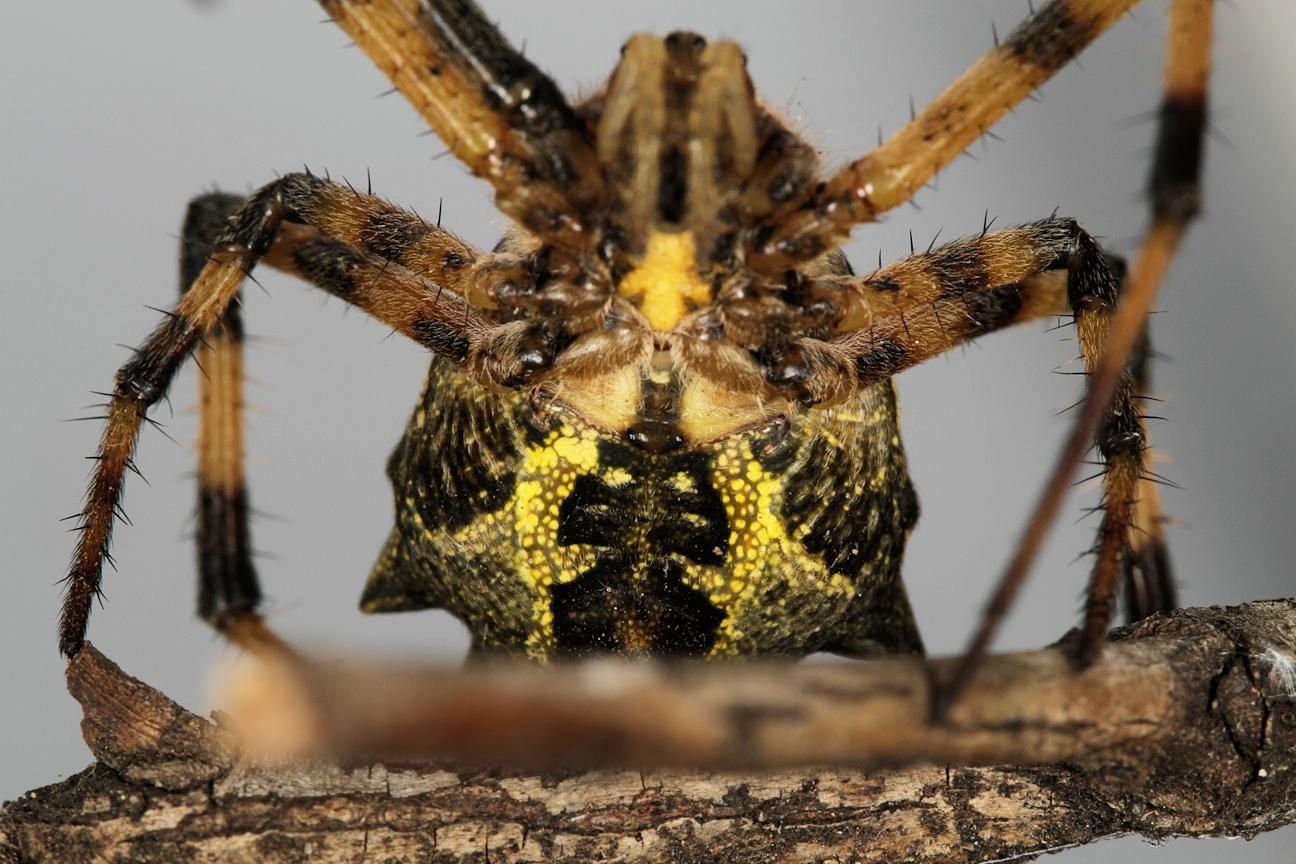

== Conservation ==
Argiope flavipalpis is listed as Least Concern by the South African National Biodiversity Institute due to its wide global distribution. The species is protected in six protected areas including Kosi Bay Nature Reserve, Ndumo Game Reserve, and Kruger National Park.

== Taxonomy ==
The species was originally described by Lucas in 1858 as Epeira flavipalpis. It was revised by Bjørn in 1997, who synonymized Argiope cuspidata with this species.
