= Argiope anomalopalpis =

Garden Orb-Web Spider

Conservation status
- Least Concern (SANBI Red List)

Scientific classification
- Kingdom: Animalia
- Phylum: Arthropoda
- Subphylum: Chelicerata
- Class: Arachnida
- Order: Araneae
- Infraorder: Araneomorphae
- Family: Araneidae
- Genus: Argiope
- Species: A. anomalopalpis

Binomial name
- Argiope anomalopalpis Bjørn, 1997

Species of spider

Argiope anomalopalpis is a species of spiders in the family Araneidae, found in DR Congo and South Africa. It is commonly known as the garden orb-web spider.

== Distribution ==
Argiope anomalopalpis has been collected from the Democratic Republic of Congo and South Africa. In South Africa, the species is recorded from a single locality in the Eastern Cape, specifically the Dwesa Nature Reserve.

== Habitat and ecology ==
The species inhabits the Forest biome and is known to construct orb webs. The single South African specimen was collected from Dwesa Nature Reserve at an elevation of 7 m above sea level.

== Conservation ==
Argiope anomalopalpis is listed as Least Concern by the South African National Biodiversity Institute due to its wide geographical range across Africa. The species is protected in the Dwesa Nature Reserve.

== Taxonomy ==
The species was originally described by Bjørn in 1997 from the Democratic Republic of Congo. It is possibly under-collected and suspected to occur in countries between the Democratic Republic of Congo and South Africa.
