= Argiope blanda =

Scientific classification
- Domain: Eukaryota
- Kingdom: Animalia
- Phylum: Arthropoda
- Subphylum: Chelicerata
- Class: Arachnida
- Order: Araneae
- Infraorder: Araneomorphae
- Family: Araneidae
- Genus: Argiope
- Species: A. blanda

Binomial name
- Argiope blanda O. P.-Cambridge, 1898

Species of spider

Argiope blanda is a species of orb weaver in the spider family Araneidae. It is found in a range from the United States to Costa Rica.
