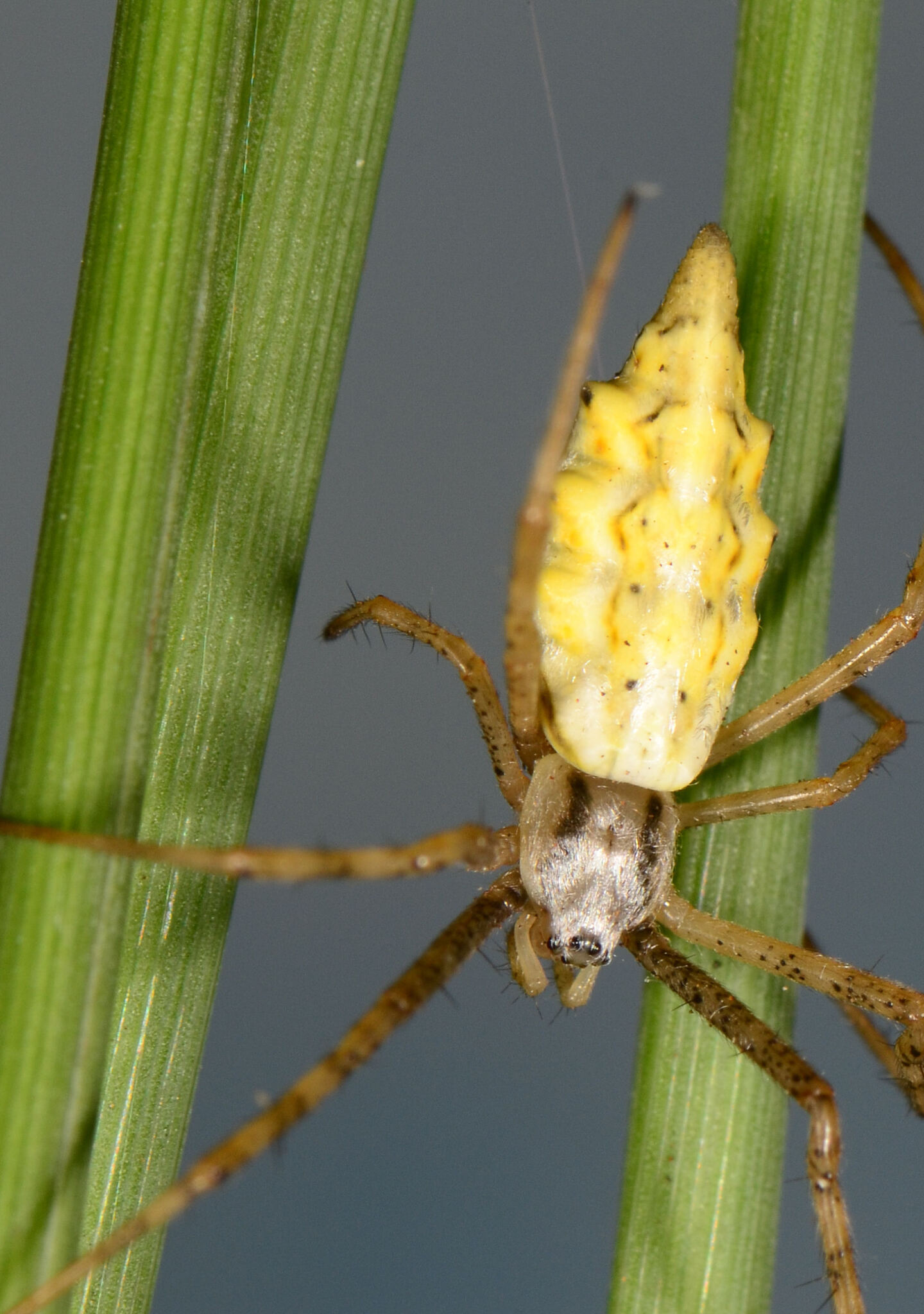
- female
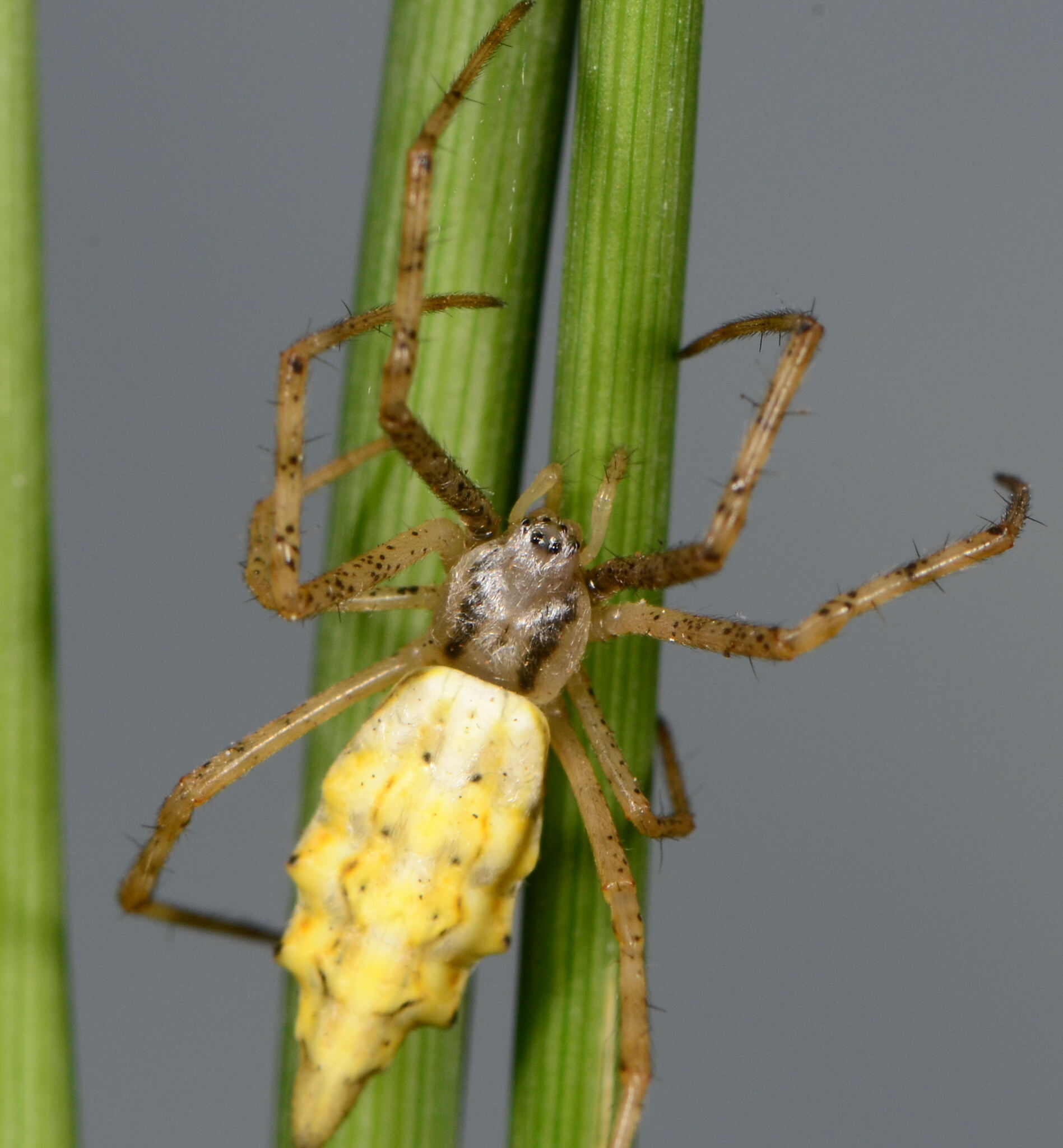
- female

Scientific classification
- Kingdom: Animalia
- Phylum: Arthropoda
- Subphylum: Chelicerata
- Class: Arachnida
- Order: Araneae
- Infraorder: Araneomorphae
- Family: Araneidae
- Genus: Argiope
- Species: A. tapinolobata

Binomial name
- Argiope tapinolobata Bjørn, 1997

= Argiope tapinolobata =

Long-bodied Garden Orb-Web Spider

Species of spider

Argiope tapinolobata is a species of spider in the family Araneidae, found from Senegal to South Africa. It is commonly known as the long-bodied garden orb-web spider.

== Distribution ==
Argiope tapinolobata is known from Senegal, Namibia, and South Africa. In South Africa, the species is recorded from a single locality in Gauteng.

== Habitat and ecology ==
The species is characterized by a female abdomen that is almost cylindrical, over twice as long as wide, with very shallow lobes. The South African specimen was sampled from grassland in mid-January.

== Description ==
The female of A. tapinolobata has a distinctive abdomen that is almost cylindrical and over twice as long as wide, with very shallow lobes. This distinguishes it from other Argiope species which typically have more rounded abdomens.

== Conservation ==
Argiope tapinolobata is listed as Least Concern by the South African National Biodiversity Institute due to its wide geographical range across Africa. The species is possibly under-sampled in southern Africa.

== Taxonomy ==
The species was described by Bjørn in 1997 from Senegal. It is possibly under-collected and suspected to occur in countries between its known distribution points. Only the female is known.
