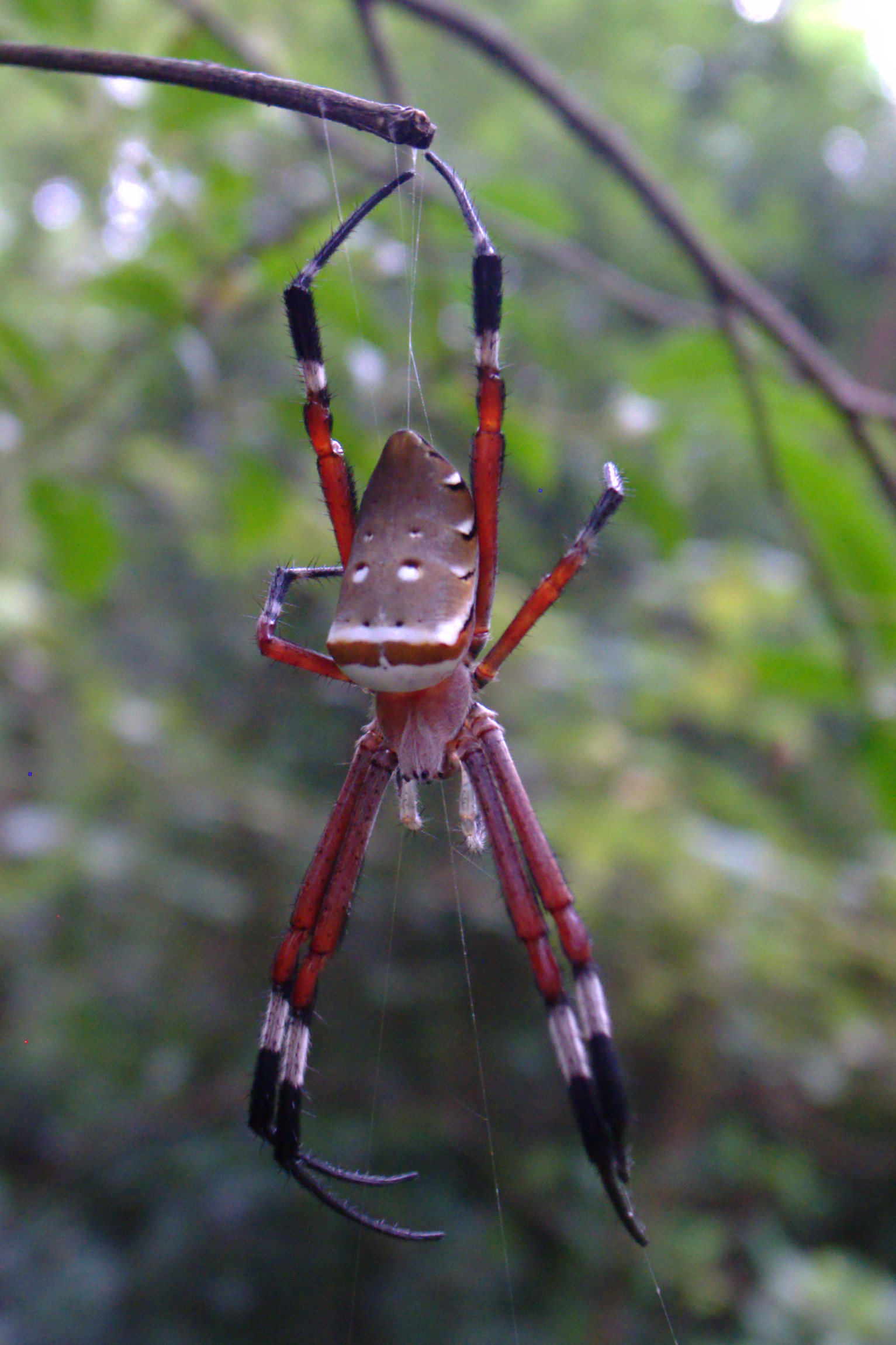
- female from Taiwan

Scientific classification
- Kingdom: Animalia
- Phylum: Arthropoda
- Subphylum: Chelicerata
- Class: Arachnida
- Order: Araneae
- Infraorder: Araneomorphae
- Family: Araneidae
- Genus: Argiope
- Species: A. ocula

Binomial name
- Argiope ocula Fox, 1938

Synonyms
- Argiope ohsumiensis Yaginuma, 1967

= Argiope ocula =

Species of orb-weaver spider

Argiope ocula is a species of orb-weaver spider in the genus Argiope. It was first described by Irving Fox in 1938. The species is found in East Asia, including China, Taiwan, and Japan.

== Taxonomy ==
The species was originally described as Argiope ocula by Fox in 1938. In 1967, Yaginuma described what he believed to be a new species, Argiope ohsumiensis, from Japan. However, in 1983, Levi determined that A. ohsumiensis was actually a junior synonym of A. ocula, establishing the current taxonomic understanding.

== Distribution ==
A. ocula is distributed across East Asia, with confirmed records from China, Taiwan, and Japan (particularly southern Kyushu and the Satsunan Islands).

== Description ==
Argiope ocula exhibits significant sexual dimorphism, with females being considerably larger than males.

Females reach approximately 20 mm in body length. The carapace is brown with white hairs. The abdomen is distinctively elongated and narrow, with a yellowish-brown dorsal surface featuring yellow transverse lines at the front and characteristic yellow and black crescent-shaped markings on the sides. This elongated abdominal shape and distinctive coloration pattern readily distinguish females of this species from other Argiope species.

Males are much smaller, reaching about 7 mm in body length. The carapace is brown with two light-colored longitudinal stripes. The abdomen is also elongated, with a light brown dorsal surface and three black spots toward the posterior end. The elongated abdomen helps distinguish males from most other Argiope species, except for Argiope boesenbergi. However, males can be differentiated from A. boesenbergi by differences in the structure of the median apophysis and embolus of the pedipalps.
