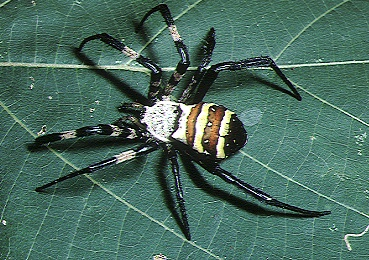
- female from Okinawa
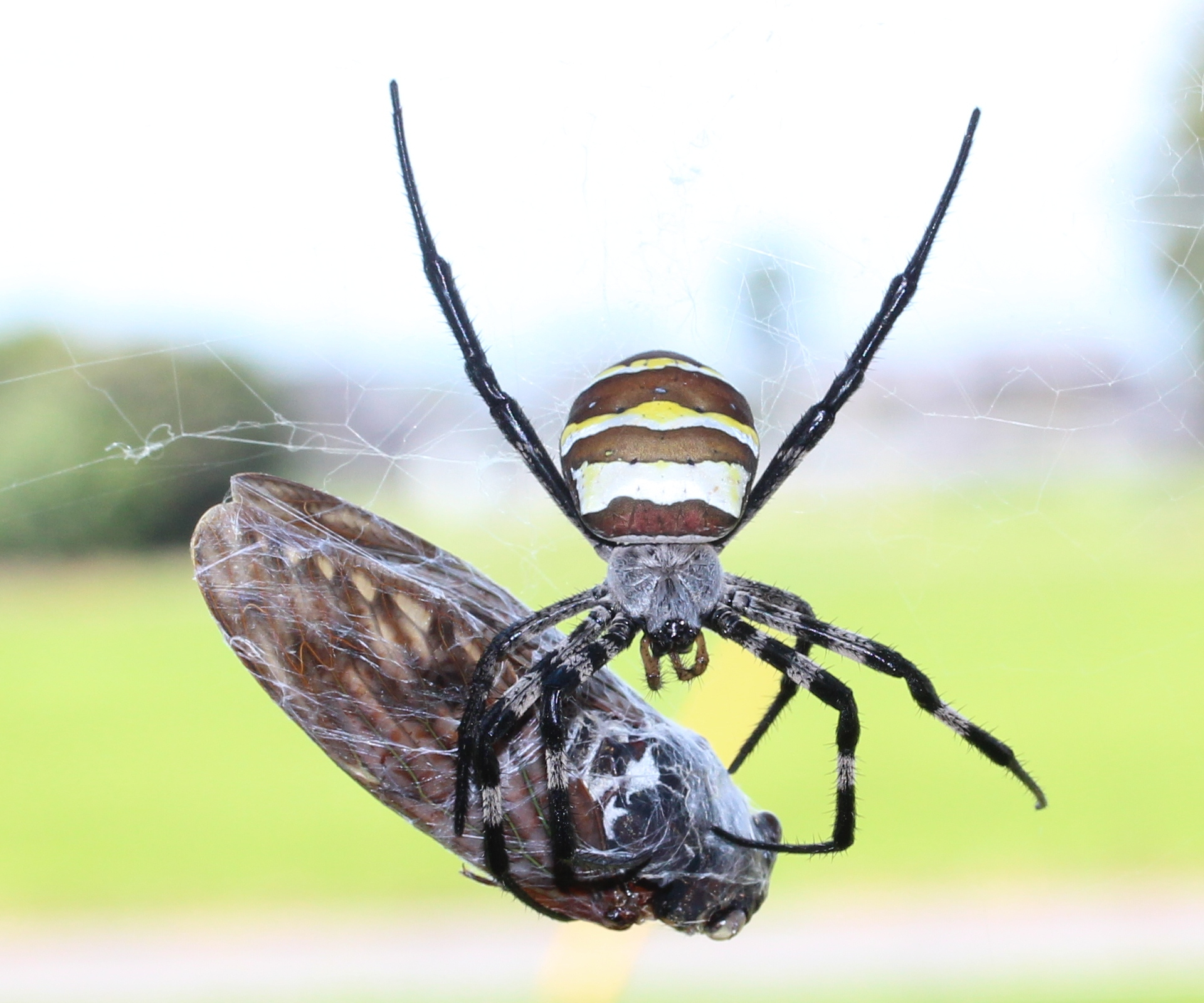
- female with prey

Scientific classification
- Kingdom: Animalia
- Phylum: Arthropoda
- Subphylum: Chelicerata
- Class: Arachnida
- Order: Araneae
- Infraorder: Araneomorphae
- Family: Araneidae
- Genus: Argiope
- Species: A. amoena

Binomial name
- Argiope amoena L. Koch, 1878

Synonyms
- Argiope davidi Schenkel, 1963

= Argiope amoena =

Kogane Spider

Species of spider

Argiope amoena is a species of spider of the genus Argiope in the family Araneidae. It is found across East Asia, including China, Korea, Taiwan, and Japan, and has been introduced to Hawaii.

== Etymology ==
The specific epithet amoena is Latin for "pleasant" or "charming".

== Distribution ==
A. amoena is naturally distributed throughout China, Korea, Taiwan, and Japan. The species has also been introduced to Hawaii. In Korea, it is found throughout the Korean Peninsula.

== Habitat ==
Argiope amoena constructs orb webs with distinctive X-shaped stabilimenta between trees and bushes in sunny places in mountains and grasslands.

== Description ==
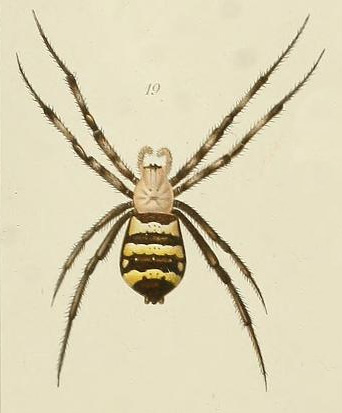
drawing of female from 1906

Like related species, Argiope amoena exhibits pronounced sexual dimorphism, with females being significantly larger than males.

=== Female ===
Females have a body length of 20.0-30.0 mm. The carapace is flat, dark brown, longer than wide, and covered with fine grayish white hairs. The cervical and radial furrows and median groove are distinct. The chelicerae are dark brown. The sternum has a yellow stripe at the center with dark brown margins. The legs are grayish brown with black annulations and well-developed spines.

The opisthosoma is shield-shaped, straight anteriorly, broad and slightly pointed posteriorly, and longer than wide. The abdominal dorsum displays three yellow and three dark brown transverse bands alternating with each other. The female epigyne lacks a scape, with the lower part of the median septum being much broader.

=== Male ===
Males have a body length of 5.0-8.0 mm. Males are similar to females but smaller and darker, with indistinct patterns. The male pedipalp has a median apophysis with a slender, pointed spur projecting downward.

== Taxonomy ==
The species was first described by Ludwig Carl Christian Koch in 1878. Argiope davidi, described by Schenkel in 1963, was later synonymized with A. amoena by Levi in 1983.
