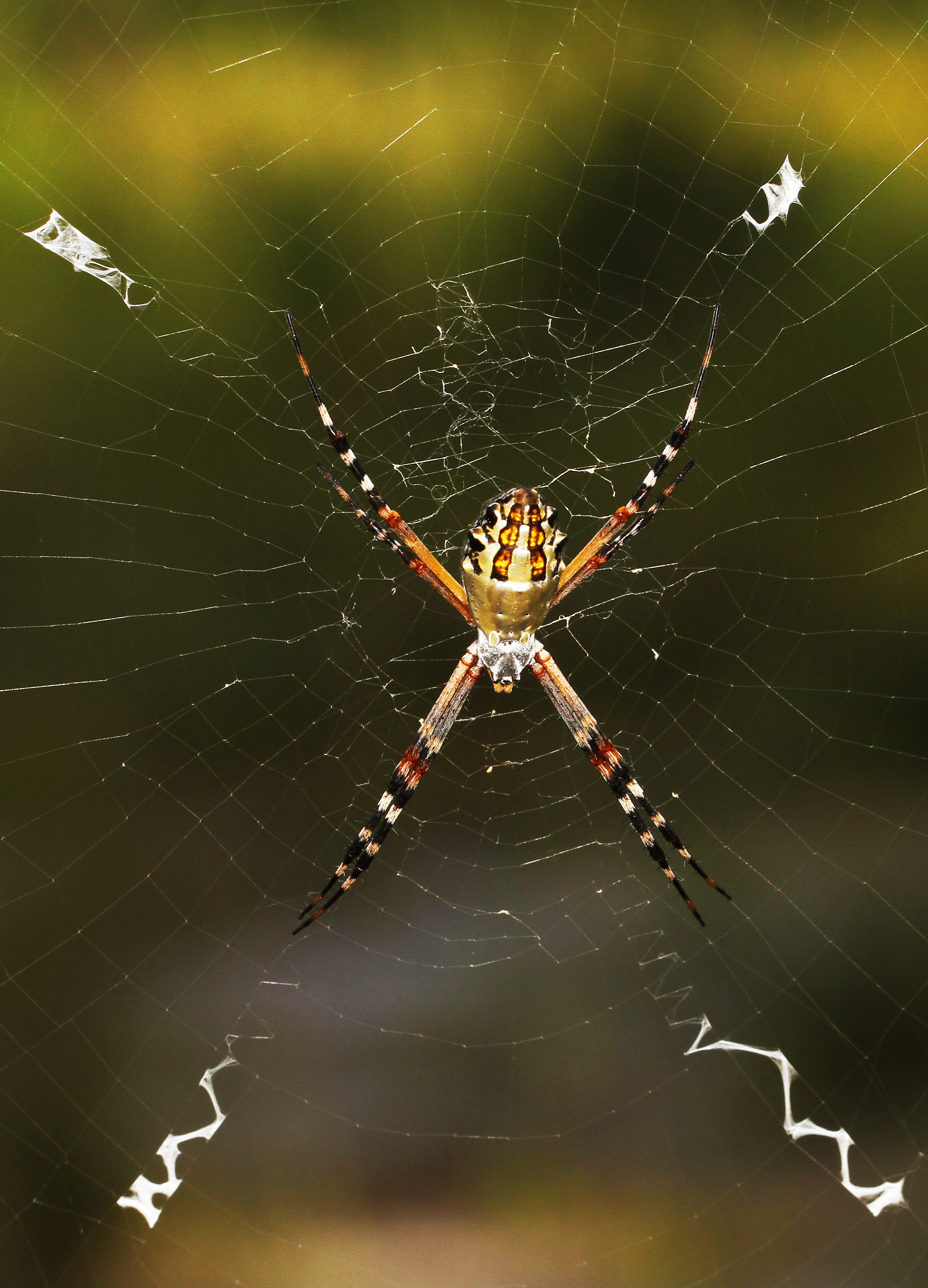

Scientific classification
- Kingdom: Animalia
- Phylum: Arthropoda
- Subphylum: Chelicerata
- Class: Arachnida
- Order: Araneae
- Infraorder: Araneomorphae
- Family: Araneidae
- Genus: Argiope
- Species: A. florida

Binomial name
- Argiope florida Chamberlin & Ivie, 1944

= Argiope florida =

Species of spider

Argiope florida, known generally as the Florida argiope or Florida garden spider, is a species of orb weaver in the spider family Araneidae. It is found in the United States.

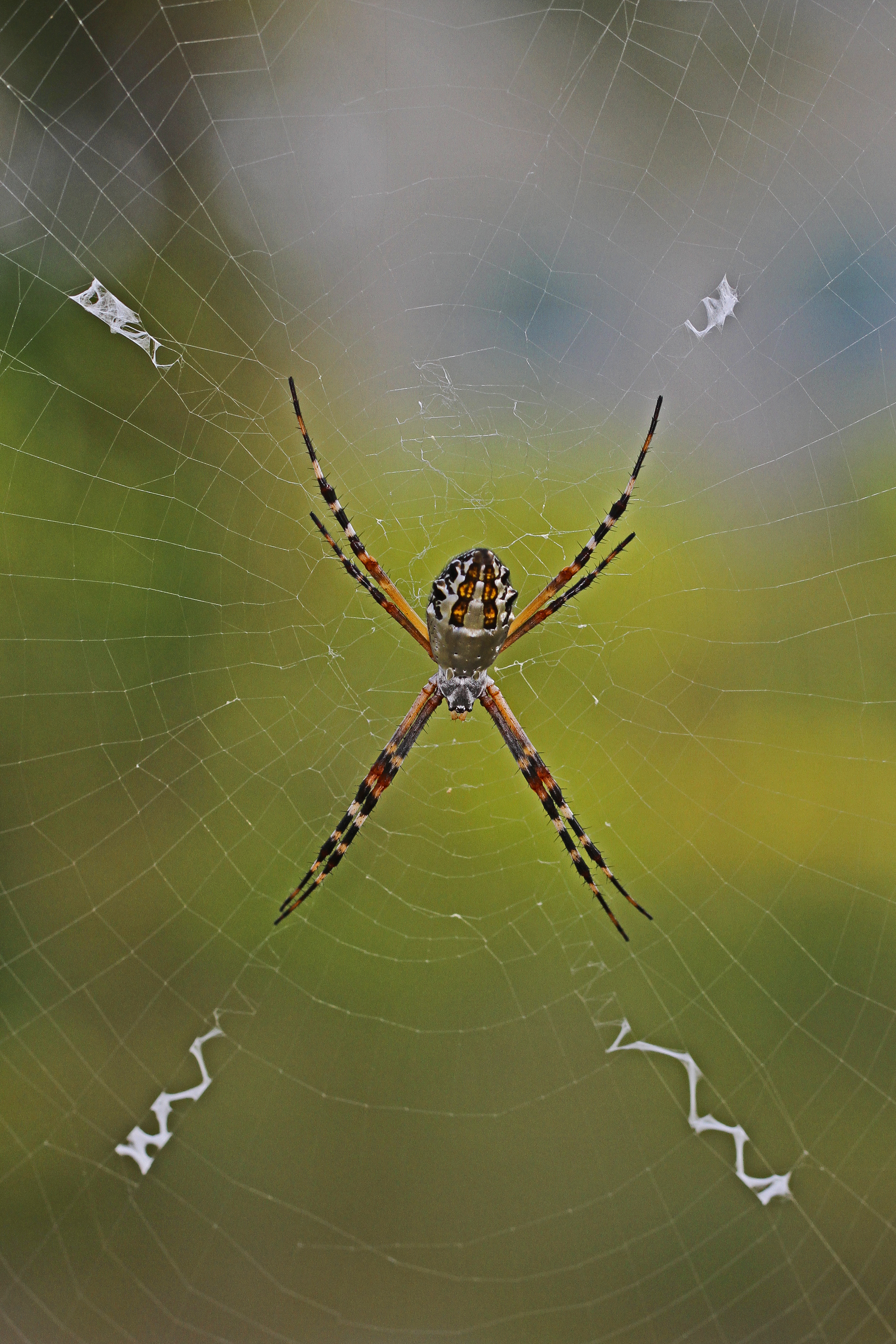
Florida argiope, Argiope florida

In fact, the habitat of Argiope florida is restricted to some areas in southeast United States.
