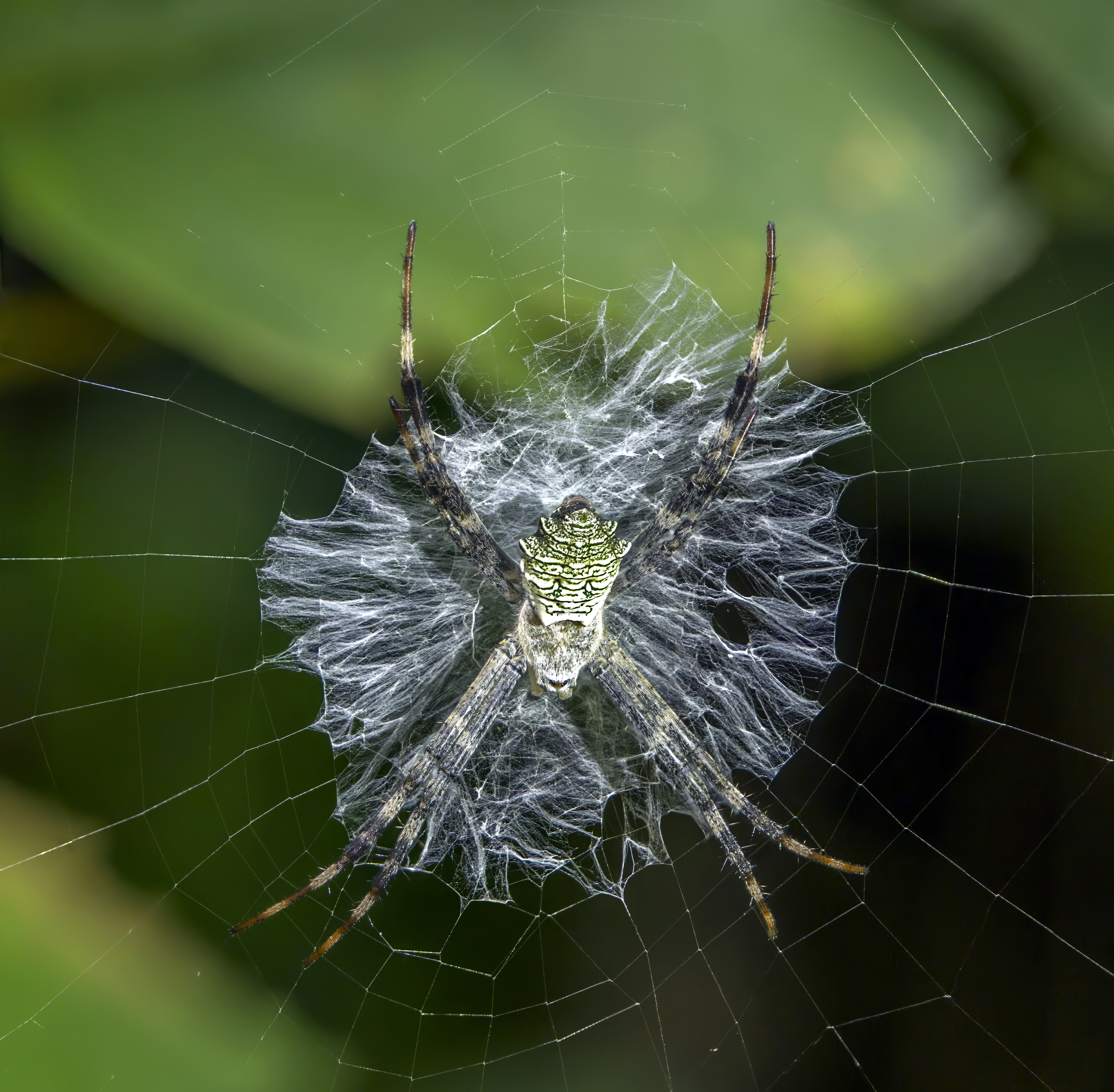
- A. flavipalpis on web with stabilimentum in Ghana
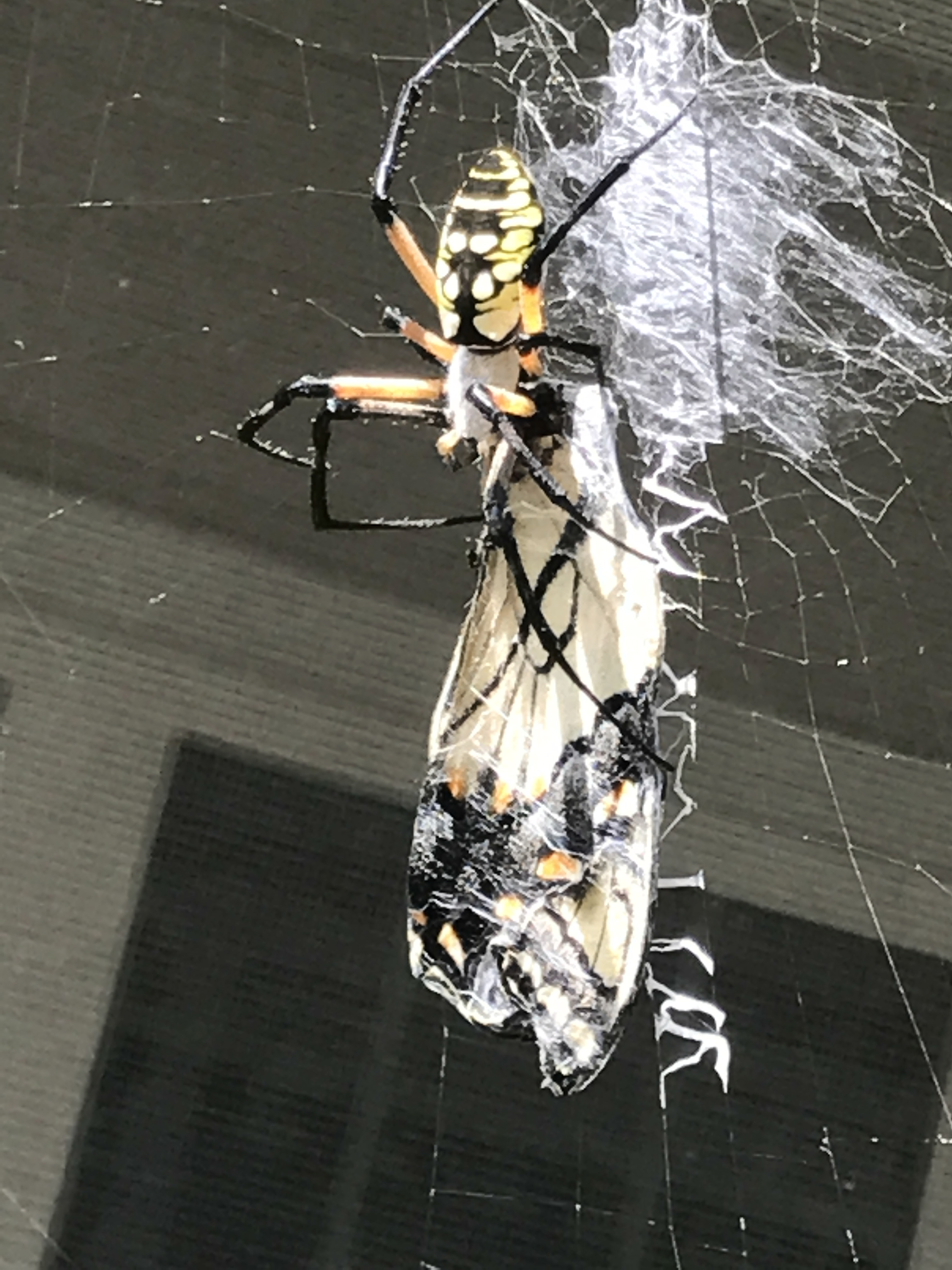
- Writing spider eating a swallowtail butterfly

Scientific classification
- Kingdom: Animalia
- Phylum: Arthropoda
- Subphylum: Chelicerata
- Class: Arachnida
- Order: Araneae
- Infraorder: Araneomorphae
- Family: Araneidae
- Genus: Argiope; Audouin, 1826

Type species
- Aranea lobata Pallas, 1772

Species
- 89, see text.

Synonyms
- Austrargiope

= Argiope (spider) =

Argiope Temporal range: Neogene–present

Genus of spiders

Argiope is a genus of large orb weaver spiders in the family Araneidae. Species in the genus often have a strikingly coloured abdomen and long, often banded legs, and build large, circular orb webs that are often marked with a conspicuous white web decoration. The genus is distributed throughout the world, and most countries with tropical or temperate climates host one or more species. They are commonly found in gardens, grasslands, fields and other areas with vegetation.

== Description ==
Argiope are large orb weavers; females reach a body length of up to 3 cm (1.2 in). The carapace is typically covered in silvery hairs, which reflect sunlight when the spider crawls in the sun, giving it a metallic, white appearance. The head region of the carapace is considerably narrower than the wide thoracic region behind it, and the chelicerae are relatively weak. The legs are long and slender, often dark and sometimes banded. The first pair of legs is the longest and the second almost as long; the fourth pair is slightly shorter or, in African species, about as long, and the third pair is much shorter.

The upper side of the abdomen is often brightly coloured, commonly with silver or gold and black. At its simplest the abdomen is oval and up to twice as long as it is wide, but it often has lateral lobes or projections, and in some species its rear end extends over the spinnerets. The underside usually has a dark median area with white spots, bordered by two pale longitudinal bands.

The genus shows pronounced sexual dimorphism. The male is much smaller than the female; in African species, the female's body length can be up to five times the male's. Males of the same species vary considerably in size and colour. The male's carapace is often bare or only sparsely covered with hairs, and its chelicerae are often very small.

== Taxonomy ==
The genus was first described by Jean Victoire Audouin in 1826, although he wrote that it had been established by Savigny. The type species is Aranea lobata Pallas, 1772.

In the first edition of the work in which the description appeared (Description de l'Égypte: Histoire Naturelle), Audouin used the spelling "Argyope" for both the French vernacular name and the Latin generic name. In the second edition, he continued to use "Argyope" for the French vernacular name, but the first mention of the Latin generic name was spelled "Argiope", although the binomial names of the species continued to use "Argyope". This led to controversy as to whether Audouin had intended to correct the spelling of the generic name, which is derived from the Greek αργιόπη. In 1975, the International Commission on Zoological Nomenclature validated the spelling "Argiope", on the basis that the change from the first to the second edition was an intended correction.

=== Etymology ===
Sources differ on the origin of the genus name. It has been said to derive from the Latin word argentum, meaning silver, but it is also given as derived from the Greek Ἀργιόπη (Argiópē), the basis on which the spelling "Argiope" rather than "Argyope" was treated as a correction (see above). Argiope is a name from Greek mythology, interpreted as meaning "she of the white face".

=== Common names ===
Argiope bruennichi is commonly known as the wasp spider. In Australia, Argiope keyserlingi and Argiope aetherea are known as St Andrew's cross spiders, for their habit of resting in the web with paired legs outstretched in the shape of an X, mirroring the large white web decoration beneath them, which has the same form as the cross of St Andrew.

In North America, Argiope aurantia is commonly known as the black and yellow garden spider, zipper spider, corn spider, or writing spider, because of the similarity of its web decorations to writing.

The East Asian species Argiope amoena is known in Japan as kogane-gumo. In the Philippines, Argiope species are known as gagambang ekis ("X spider") and gagambang pari ("priest spider"), as the spider's body resembles a priest's head with a mitre.

=== Species ===
As of November 2026, the genus includes 87 species and two subspecies. The list of species continues to be revised. In 2026, A. undulata, which Levi had treated as a synonym of A. pulchella in 1983, was reinstated as a valid species, and A. sapoa was found to be a synonym of Gea spinipes.

- Argiope aemula (Walckenaer, 1841) – India to Philippines, Indonesia (Java, Sulawesi), Vanuatu
- Argiope aetherea (Walckenaer, 1841) – China to Australia
- Argiope aetheroides Yin, Wang, Zhang, Peng & Chen, 1989 – China, Japan
- Argiope ahngeri Spassky, 1932 – Iran, Kazakhstan, Kyrgyzstan, Turkmenistan, Uzbekistan, Tajikistan?
- Argiope amoena L. Koch, 1878 – China, Korea, Taiwan, Japan. Introduced to Hawaii
- Argiope anasuja Thorell, 1887 – Seychelles, Maldives, Iran, Pakistan, India, Sri Lanka, Australia (Cocos Is.)
- Argiope anomalopalpis Bjørn, 1997 – DR Congo, South Africa
- Argiope appensa (Walckenaer, 1841) – Taiwan to New Guinea. Introduced to Hawaii
- Argiope argentata (Fabricius, 1775) – United States to Chile, Argentina
- Argiope aurantia Lucas, 1833 – Canada to Costa Rica
- Argiope aurocincta Pocock, 1898 – DR Congo, Kenya, Tanzania, South Africa
- Argiope australis (Walckenaer, 1805) – Cape Verde, Senegal, Morocco, Central, Eastern and Southern Africa
- Argiope beibeng Mi & Wang, 2024 – China
- Argiope bivittigera Strand, 1911 – Indonesia
- Argiope blanda O. Pickard-Cambridge, 1898 – United States to Costa Rica
- Argiope boesenbergi Levi, 1983 – China, Korea, Japan
- Argiope bougainvilla (Walckenaer, 1847) – New Guinea to Solomon Islands
- Argiope bruennichi (Scopoli, 1772) – Europe, North Africa, Turkey, Middle East, Russia (Europe to Far East), Caucasus, Iran, Central Asia to China, Korea, Japan
- Argiope brunnescentia Strand, 1911 – New Guinea, Papua New Guinea (Bismarck Arch.)
- Argiope buehleri Schenkel, 1944 – Timor
- Argiope bullocki Rainbow, 1908 – Australia (New South Wales)
- Argiope butchko LeQuier & Agnarsson, 2016 – Cuba
- Argiope caesarea Thorell, 1897 – India, Myanmar, China
- Argiope caledonia Levi, 1983 – New Caledonia, Vanuatu
- Argiope cameloides Zhu & Song, 1994 – China
- Argiope carvalhoi (Mello-Leitão, 1944) – Brazil
- Argiope catenulata (Doleschall, 1859) – India, Myanmar, China, Taiwan, Japan (Ryukyu Is.), Thailand, Malaysia, Singapore, Indonesia, Philippines, Papua New Guinea, Australia (Northern Territory), Vanuatu, Palau
- Argiope chloreides Chrysanthus, 1961 – India, China, Laos, Malaysia (peninsula), Indonesia (New Guinea)
- Argiope chloreis Thorell, 1877 – China, Malaysia (peninsula, Borneo), Indonesia (Sumatra, Sulawesi)
- Argiope comorica Bjørn, 1997 – Comoros, Mayotte
- Argiope coquereli (Vinson, 1863) – Tanzania (Zanzibar), Madagascar
- Argiope dang Jäger & Praxaysombath, 2009 – Thailand, Laos
- Argiope dietrichae Levi, 1983 – Australia (Western Australia, Northern Australia)
- Argiope doboensis Strand, 1911 – Indonesia, New Guinea
- Argiope doleschalli Thorell, 1873 – Indonesia (Moluccas)
- Argiope ericae Levi, 2004 – Brazil, Argentina
- Argiope flavipalpis (Lucas, 1858) – Africa, Yemen
- Argiope florida Chamberlin & Ivie, 1944 – United States
- Argiope halmaherensis Strand, 1907 – Indonesia (Moluccas, New Guinea), Papua New Guinea
- Argiope hinderlichi Jäger, 2012 – Laos
- Argiope hoiseni Tan, 2018 – Malaysia (peninsula)
- Argiope intricata Simon, 1877 – Philippines
- Argiope jinghongensis Yin, Peng & Wang, 1994 – China, Vietnam, Laos, Thailand
- Argiope kaingang Corronca & Rodríguez-Artigas, 2015 – Argentina
- Argiope katherina Levi, 1983 – Northern Australia
- Argiope keyserlingi Karsch, 1878 – Australia (Queensland, New South Wales, Lord Howe Is.)
- Argiope kochi Levi, 1983 – Australia (Queensland)
- Argiope legionis Motta & Levi, 2009 – Brazil
- Argiope levii Bjørn, 1997 – Kenya, Tanzania, South Africa
- Argiope lobata (Pallas, 1772) (type species) – Southern Europe to Central Asia and China, northern Africa, Tanzania, South Africa, Middle East, Pakistan, India, Myanmar
- Argiope luzona (Walckenaer, 1841) – Philippines
- Argiope macrochoera Thorell, 1891 – India (Nicobar Is.)
- Argiope madang Levi, 1984 – New Guinea
- Argiope magnifica L. Koch, 1871 – Australia (Queensland) to Solomon Is.
- Argiope mangal Koh, 1991 – India, Singapore
- Argiope manila Levi, 1983 – Philippines
- Argiope mascordi Levi, 1983 – Australia (Queensland)
- Argiope minuta Karsch, 1879 – India, Bangladesh, China, Taiwan, Korea, Japan
- Argiope modesta Thorell, 1881 – Indonesia
- Argiope niasensis Strand, 1907 – Indonesia
- Argiope ocula Fox, 1938 – China, Taiwan, Japan
- Argiope ocyaloides L. Koch, 1871 – Australia (Queensland)
- Argiope pentagona L. Koch, 1871 – Fiji
- Argiope perforata Schenkel, 1963 – China, Vietnam
- Argiope picta L. Koch, 1871 – Indonesia (Moluccas) to Australia
- Argiope pictula Strand, 1911 – Indonesia (Sulawesi)
- Argiope ponape Levi, 1983 – Pohnpei (Micronesia)
- Argiope possoica Merian, 1911 – Indonesia (Sulawesi)
- Argiope probata Rainbow, 1916 – Australia (Queensland)
- Argiope protensa L. Koch, 1872 – New Guinea, Australia, New Caledonia, New Zealand
- Argiope pulchella Thorell, 1881 – Pakistan, India to China and Indonesia
- Argiope pulchelloides Yin, Wang, Zhang, Peng & Chen, 1989 – China
- Argiope radon Levi, 1983 – Australia (Northern Territory)
- Argiope ranomafanensis Bjørn, 1997 – Madagascar
- Argiope reinwardti (Doleschall, 1859) – Malaysia, Indonesia, Papua New Guinea, Christmas Is.
- Argiope sector (Forsskål, 1776) – Cape Verde, Senegal, North Africa, Middle East
- Argiope songketica Dhiya'ulhaq & Rahmadi, 2026 – Indonesia (Borneo)
- Argiope squallica Strand, 1915 – New Guinea
- Argiope submaronica Strand, 1916 – Mexico, Bolivia, Brazil
- Argiope takum Chrysanthus, 1971 – New Guinea
- Argiope tapinolobata Bjørn, 1997 – Senegal, Namibia, South Africa
- Argiope taprobanica Thorell, 1887 – Sri Lanka
- Argiope trifasciata (Forsskål, 1775) – North, Central and South America. Introduced to St. Helena, Africa, Portugal, Israel, Jordan, Iraq, Iran, India, China, Japan, Australia (Tasmania), Pacific Is.
  - A. t. deserticola Simon, 1906 – Sudan
  - A. t. kauaiensis Simon, 1900 – Hawaii
- Argiope truk Levi, 1983 – Caroline Is.
- Argiope undulata Thorell, 1887 – India, Myanmar
- Argiope versicolor (Doleschall, 1859) – Pakistan, China, Indonesia (Java)
- Argiope vietnamensis Ono, 2010 – China, Vietnam
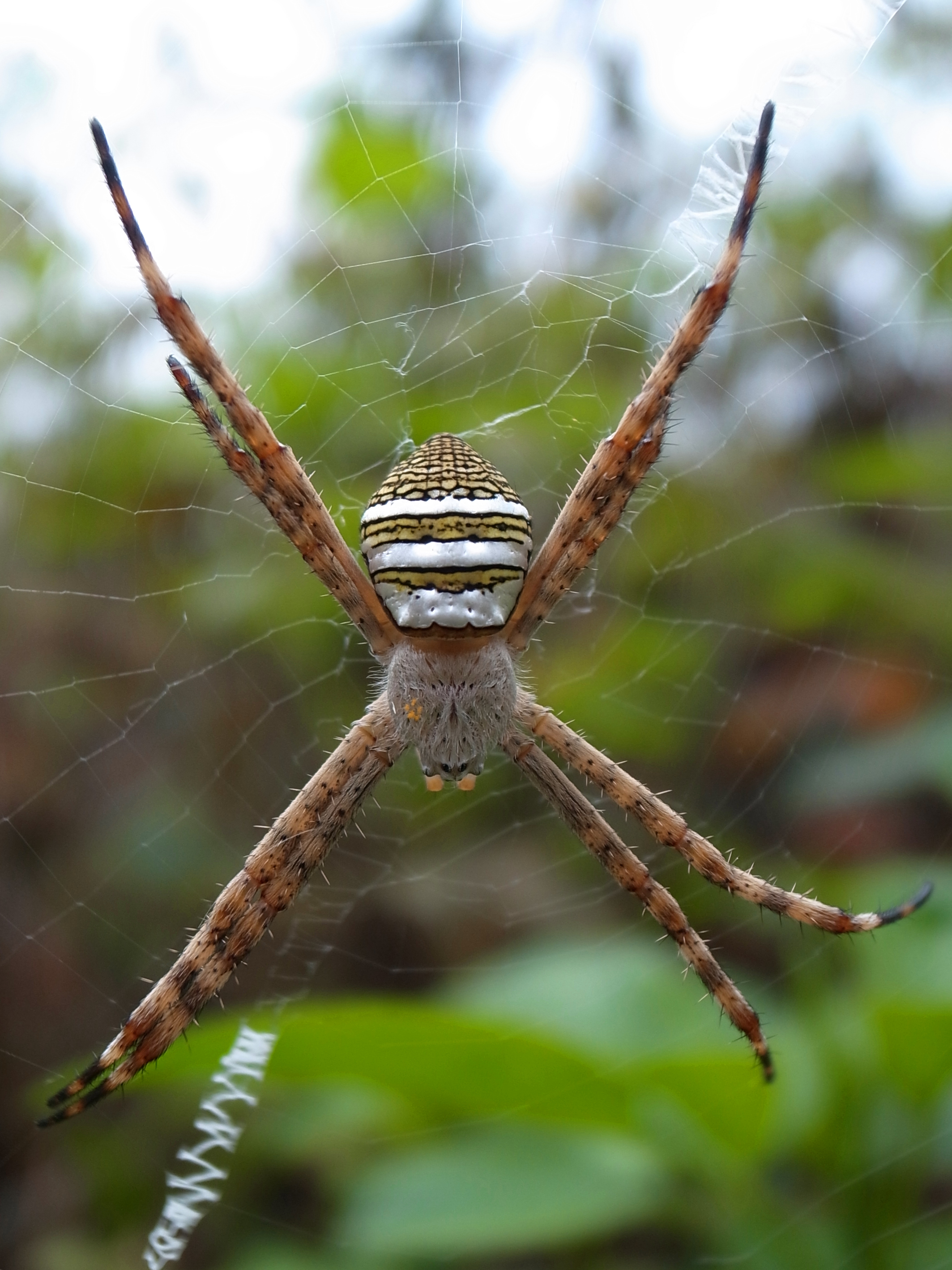
A. aemula

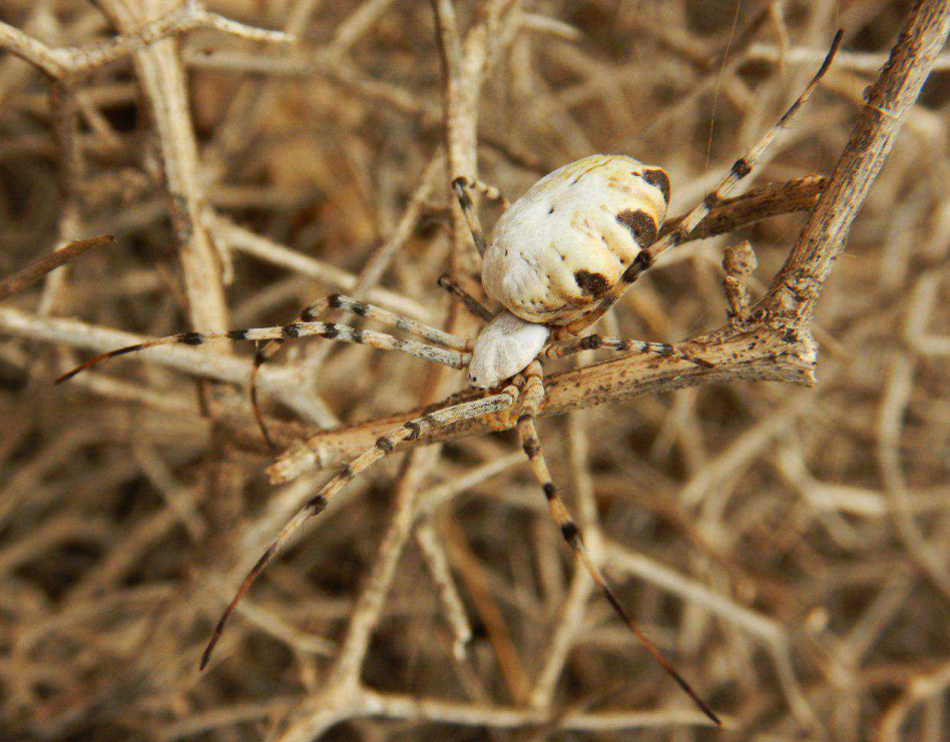
A. ahngeri

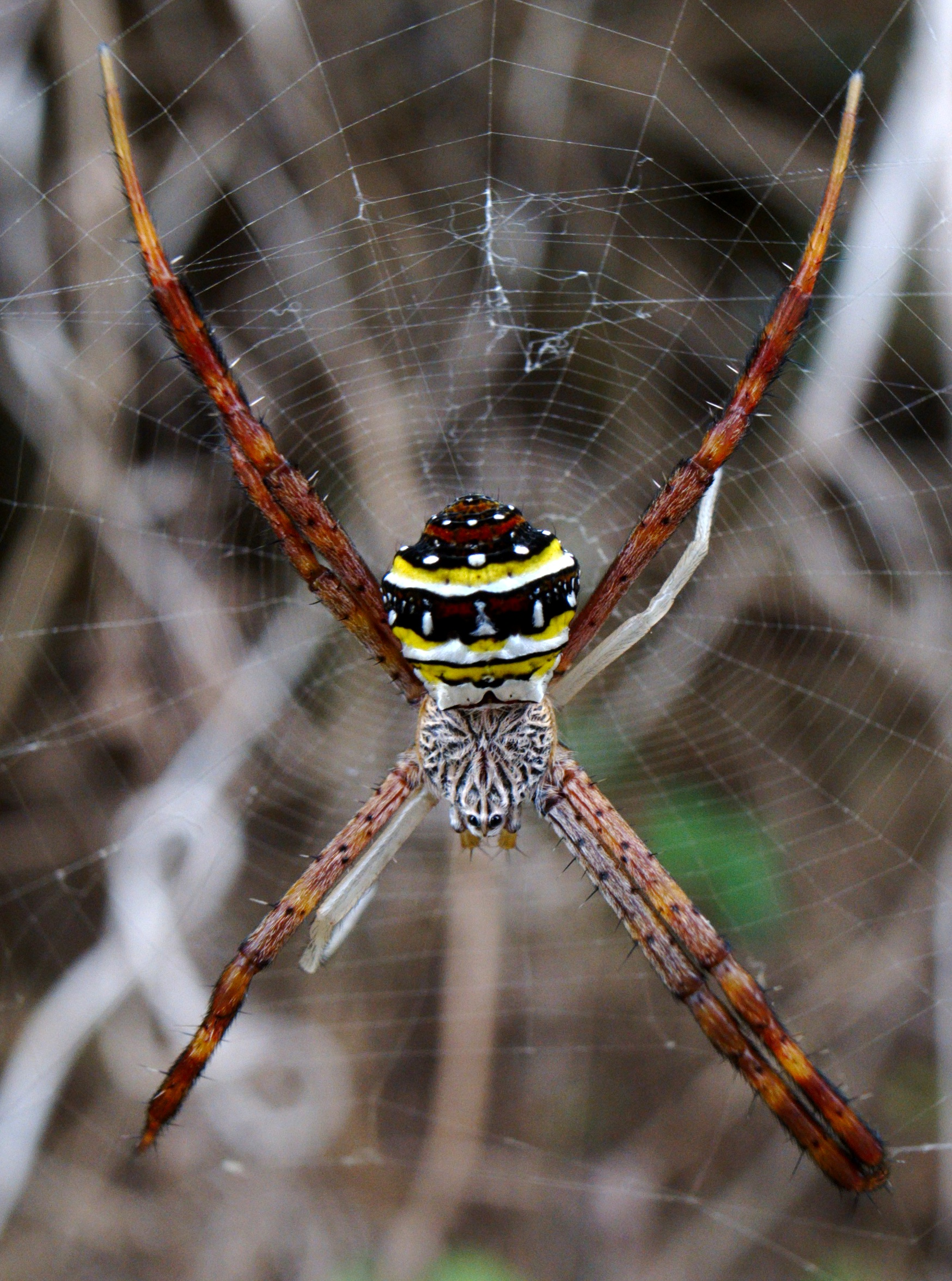
A. aetheroides

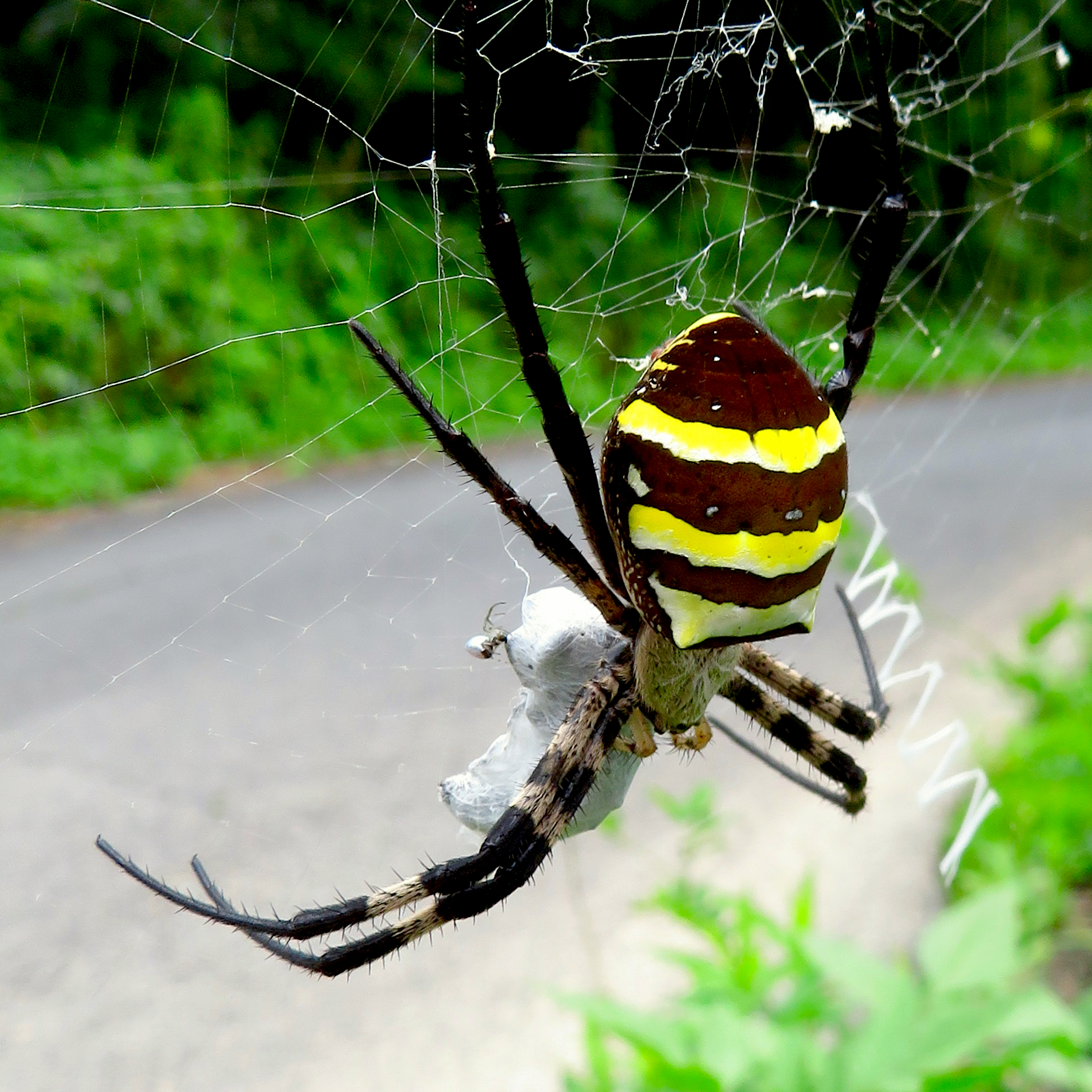
A. amoena

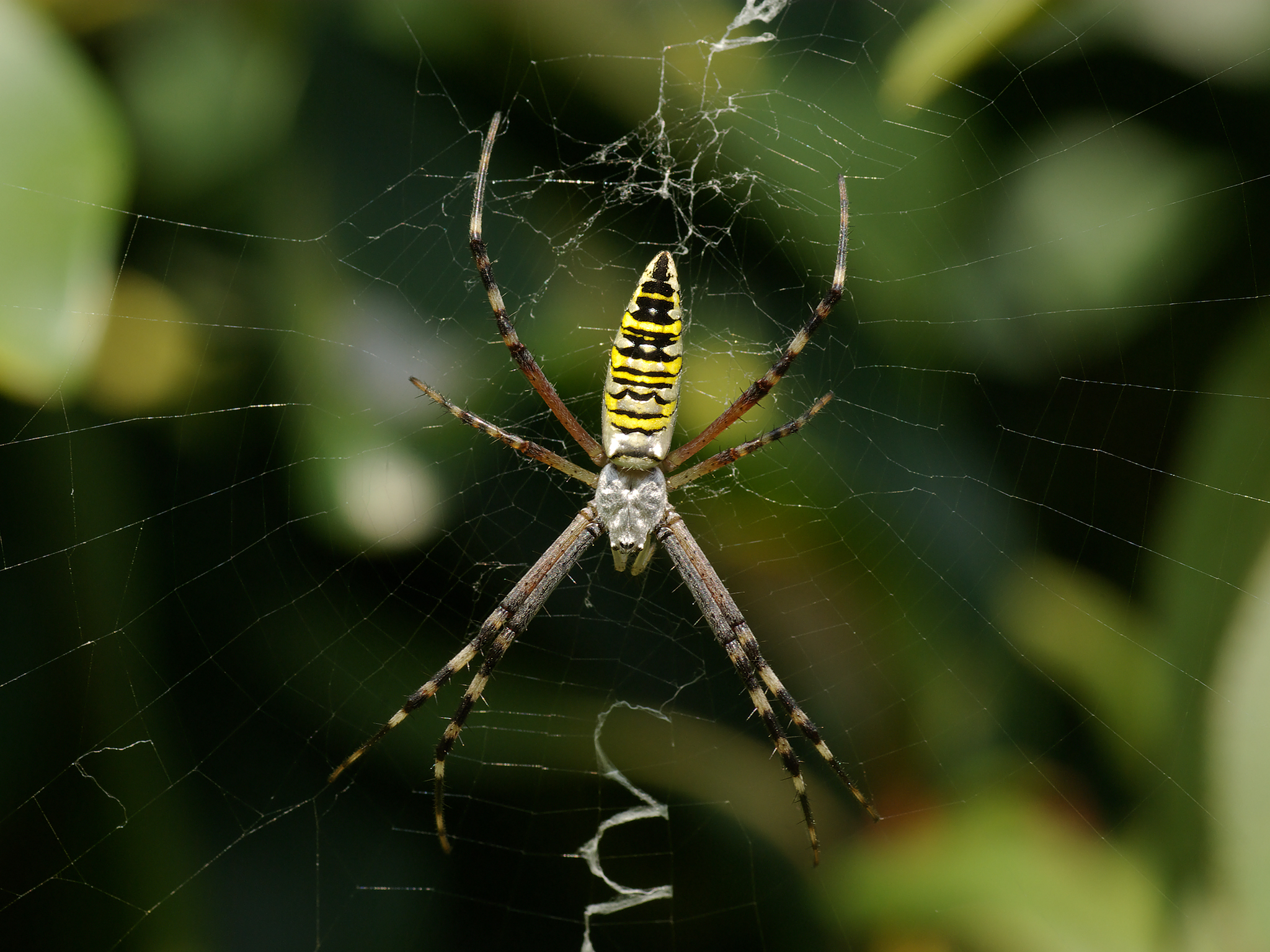
A. bruennichi

== Distribution and habitat ==
Argiope species are found worldwide, absent only from the coldest regions. The greatest number of species occurs in New Guinea and Australia, and the number declines towards the Asian mainland. In 1983, Levi counted 49 species in the western Pacific region including eastern Asia, 2 in Europe, 7 in the Americas and about 10 in Africa and western Asia; Bjørn's 1997 revision of the species of Africa and its neighbouring islands recognised 13.

Three species now occur in Europe. A. bruennichi and A. lobata are widespread across the Old World, while A. trifasciata, which is native to the Americas, has spread worldwide and been introduced to Portugal.

Most Argiope hang their conspicuous webs in the open, although some species, such as A. keyserlingi, build mainly in dense, complex vegetation (see below).

== Behaviour and ecology ==
=== Web ===
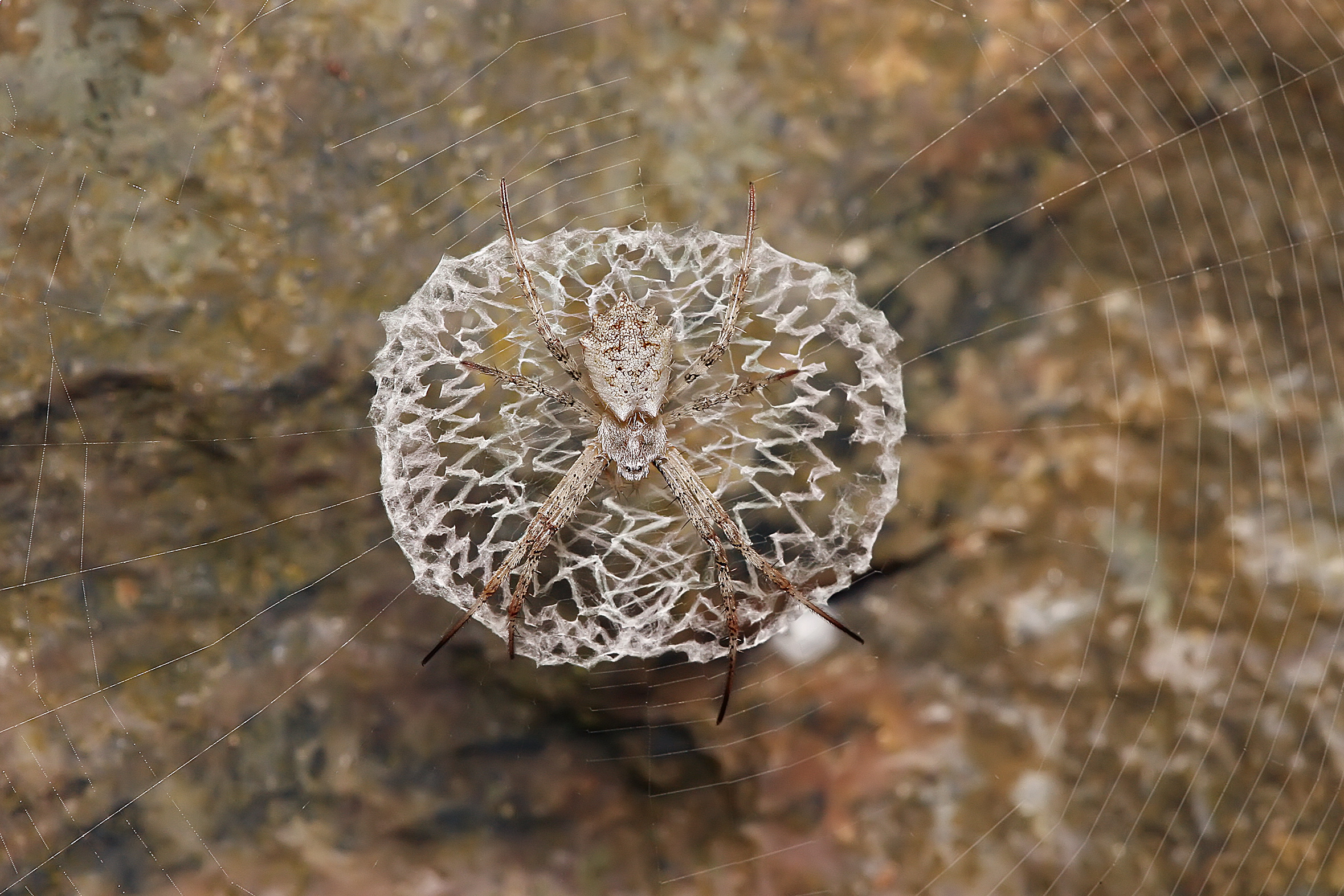
Argiope sp. blending in to an elaborate stabilimentum in Tanzania

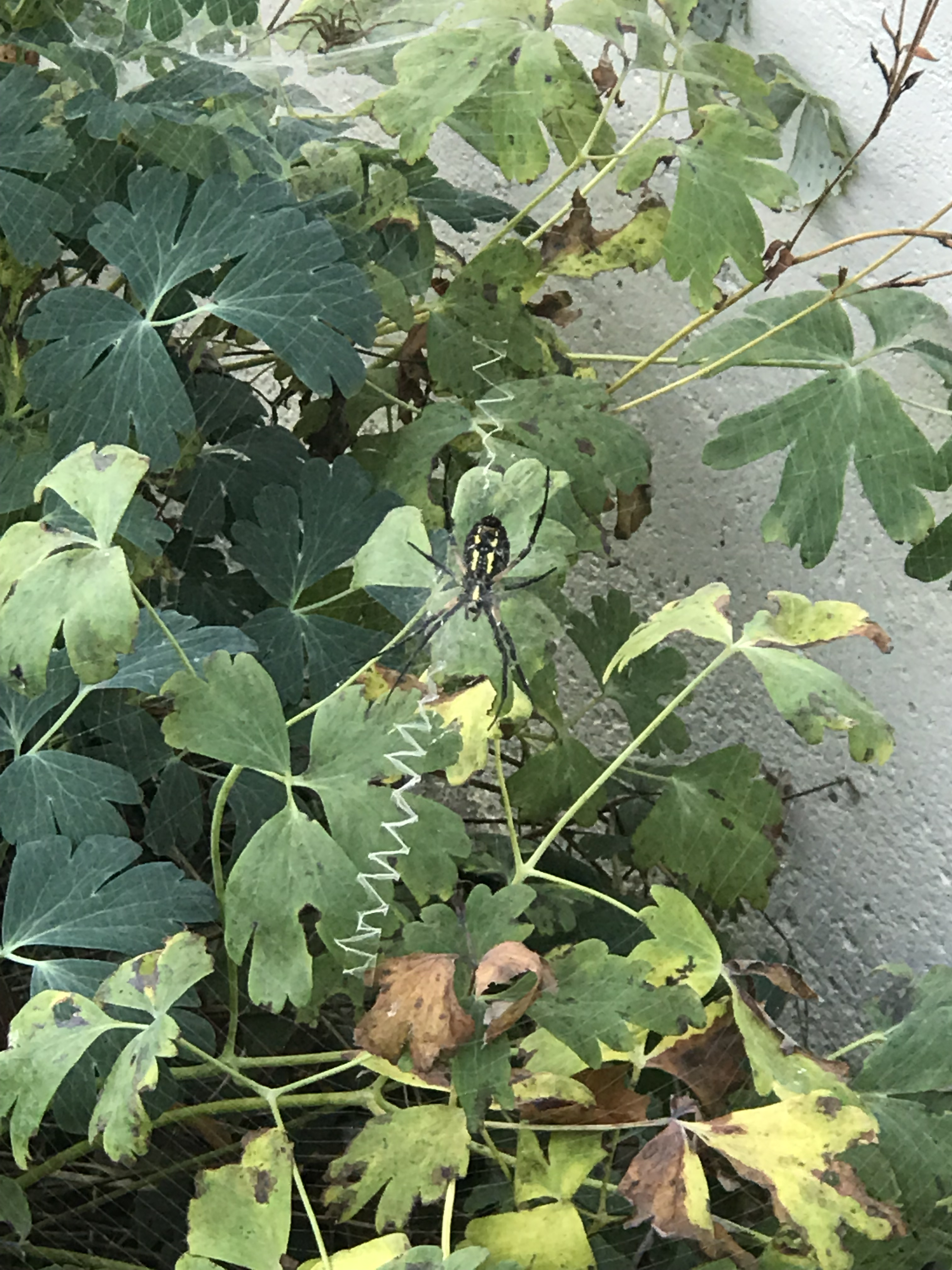
An Argiope web with stabilimentum in Independence, Missouri

Argiope build a characteristic orb web, usually with a stabilimentum (see below). The spiders are active by day and rest head-down at the centre of the web.

Most orb webs are nearly invisible, but Argiope webs include a visible pattern of banded silk that is pure white. This pattern is called the stabilimentum (plural stabilimenta) or web decoration, and it reflects UV light. It is made of a thickened zigzag weave of many threads near the centre of the web. Some stabilimenta have only two bands, as in the North American A. aurantia; more commonly there are four, though not all may be present. Depending on the species, the decoration may be a vertical line, a circular weave around the centre of the web, or an X-shaped cross, which often has a hollow centre. In species that build a cross, the spider aligns one pair of its legs with each of the four lines, forming a complete "X" of white lines with the spider at its centre.

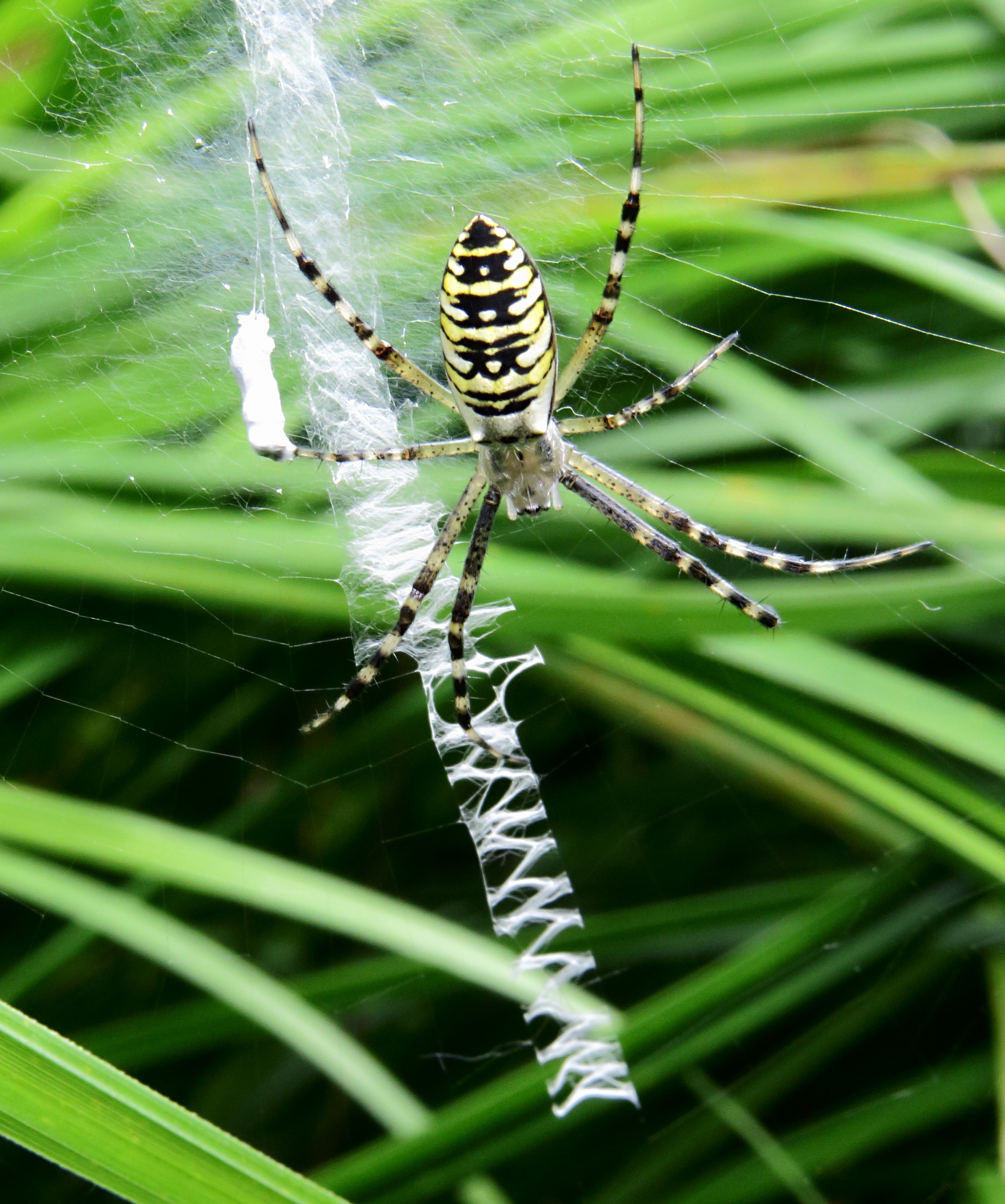
Linear stabilimentum of A. bruennichi

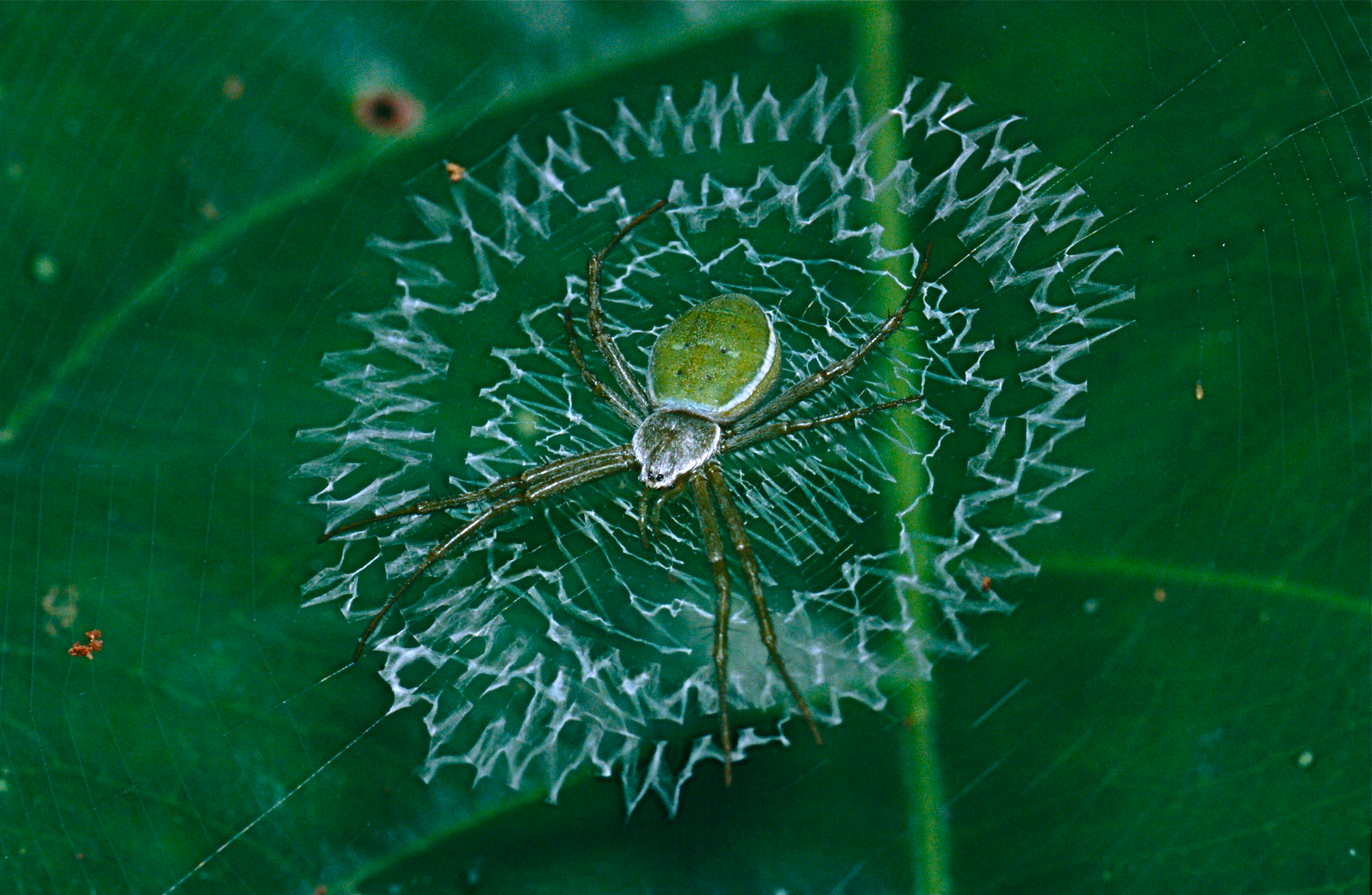
Circular stabilimentum of an Argiope sp.

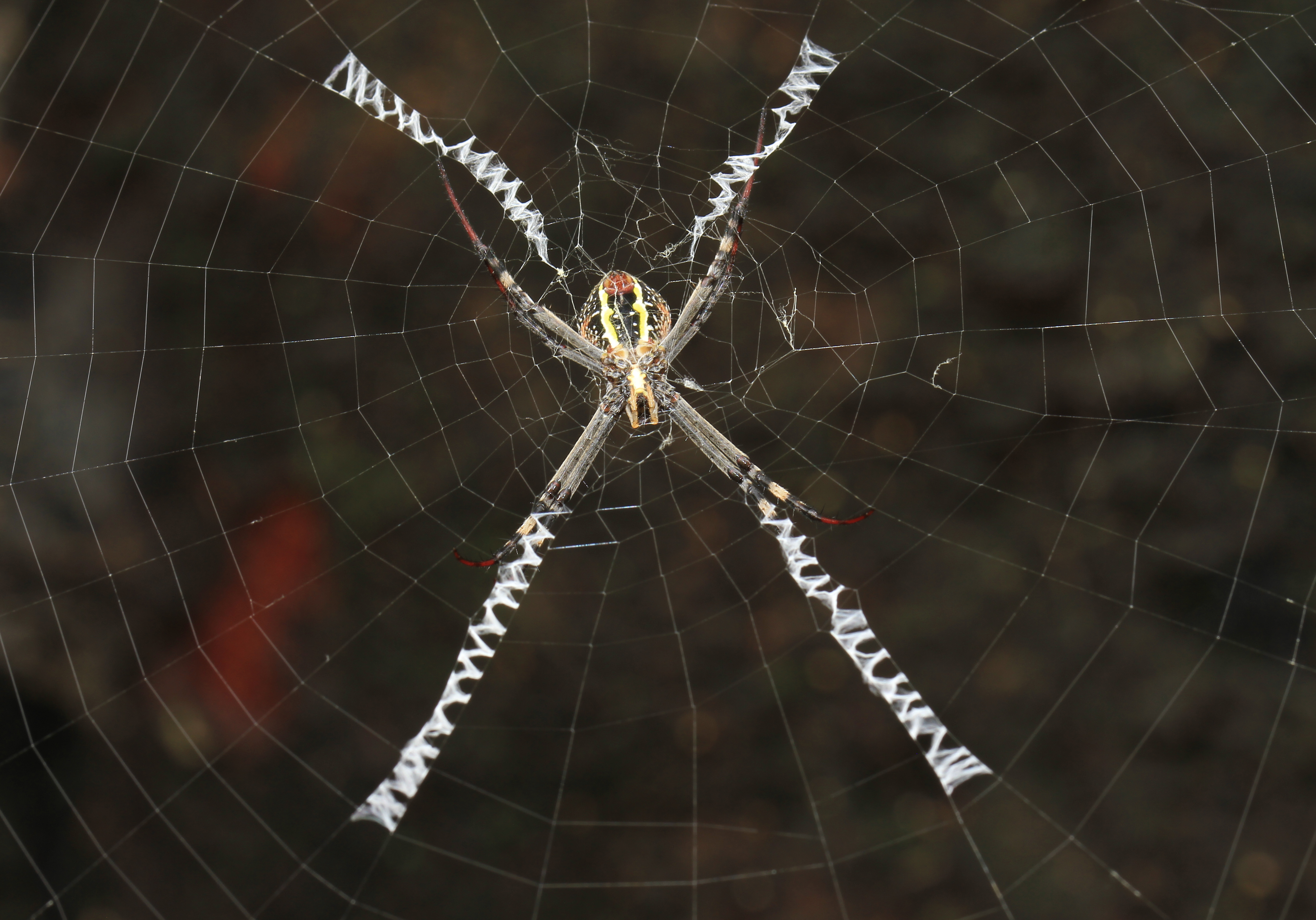
Cross-shaped stabilimentum of A. keyserlingi

Several functions have been proposed for stabilimenta. One suggestion is that they warn birds away from the web, since their bills and feathers could become gummed up with silk. Stabilimenta have been shown to play a role in attracting prey to the web, and possibly in preventing its destruction by large animals. The centres of the webs are often just under 1 metre above the ground, too low for anything much larger than a rabbit to walk under. It has therefore been speculated that the conspicuousness of the spider and its web prevents larger animals from accidentally destroying the web and possibly crushing the spider. Other studies suggest that stabilimenta may instead lead predators to the spider; species such as A. keyserlingi place their webs predominantly in closed, complex habitats, such as among sedges.

One study found that cross-shaped decorations are more effective at attracting insects than linear ones because they better match the properties of insect form vision. The authors proposed that the linear decoration is the ancestral form, and that the cross-shaped design evolved from it in several Asian and Australian Argiope species.

As Argiope sit in the centre of their webs during the day, they have developed several responses to predators, including dropping off the web, retreating to its periphery, and rapidly pumping the web in bursts of up to 30 seconds, similar to the motion made by the unrelated Pholcus phalangioides. Some species can instantly change the colour of their abdomen when they drop out of the web.

=== Diet ===
A banded orb weaving spider wraps up a large milkweed bug and then cuts it from its web, illustrating the protection the bug gains from feeding on milkweed.

Like most garden spiders, Argiope eat insects and are capable of consuming prey up to twice their size. A. submaronica has been reported to occasionally feed on the small bat Rhynchonycteris naso; the report used the name A. savignyi, which is now treated as a synonym of A. submaronica.

=== Reproduction ===
When it is time to mate, the male spins a companion web alongside the female's. In A. bruennichi, the female often eats the male during mating. In some species, the tip of the male's pedipalp – the embolus, through which sperm is transferred – breaks off during copulation, sometimes together with other parts of the palp. The broken fragment remains in the female's genital opening and plugs it.

After mating, the female lays her eggs and places her egg sac in the web. The sac contains between 400 and 1,400 eggs. The eggs hatch in autumn, but the spiderlings overwinter in the sac and emerge in spring. The egg sac is made of multiple layers of silk that protect its contents from damage; however, many species of insects have been observed to parasitise the egg sacs.

=== Injury and autotomy ===
Argiope use autotomy – restricting blood flow to one of their own legs until it falls off – to minimise blood loss due to injury. This response is triggered by pain. Honeybee and wasp venoms induce this pain in Argiope even when the injury is minor, causing the spider to drop the affected leg. The same effect can be produced by chemically fractionated components of those venoms (specifically serotonin, histamine and phospholipase A2) that also cause pain in humans.

== Venom and bites ==
Like almost all other spiders, Argiope are harmless to humans. They may bite if grabbed, but do not otherwise attack large animals. Their venom is not regarded as a serious medical problem for humans; it often contains a wide variety of polyamine toxins with potential as therapeutic agents.

Chemical structure of argiopine

The polyamine toxins identified in Argiope venom include argiopine, argiopinines and pseudoargiopinines. Argiopine, also known as argiotoxin-636 (ArgTX-636), was first isolated from the venom of A. lobata in 1986 and was one of the first acylpolyamine toxins to be described. It is made up of residues of asparagine, arginine, 2,4-dihydroxyphenylacetic acid and a polyamine. Argiopine, the argiopinines and the pseudoargiopinines all block glutamate receptors. At concentrations of 0.01–1 μmol/L, argiopine blocks insect glutamate receptors as well as vertebrate kainate receptors and AMPA receptors; the other polyamines in the venom have a lower affinity for these receptors.

A bite from the black and yellow garden spider (A. aurantia) is comparable to a bee sting, causing redness and swelling, and is not considered a medical concern for a healthy adult. Although the spiders are not aggressive, the very young, the elderly, people with compromised immune systems and people with known venom allergies should exercise caution around them, as they would around a beehive.

== Gallery ==
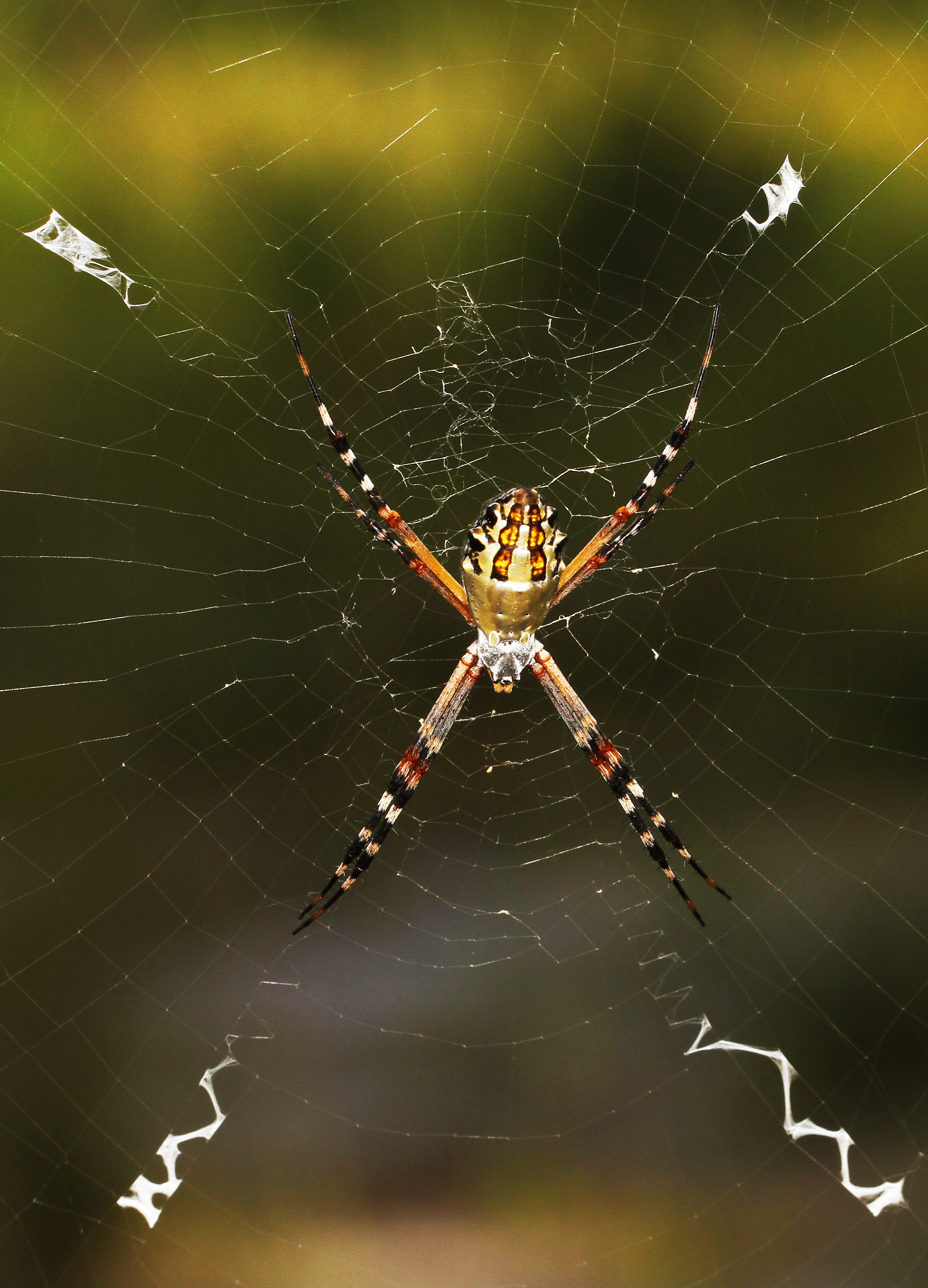
Argiope florida

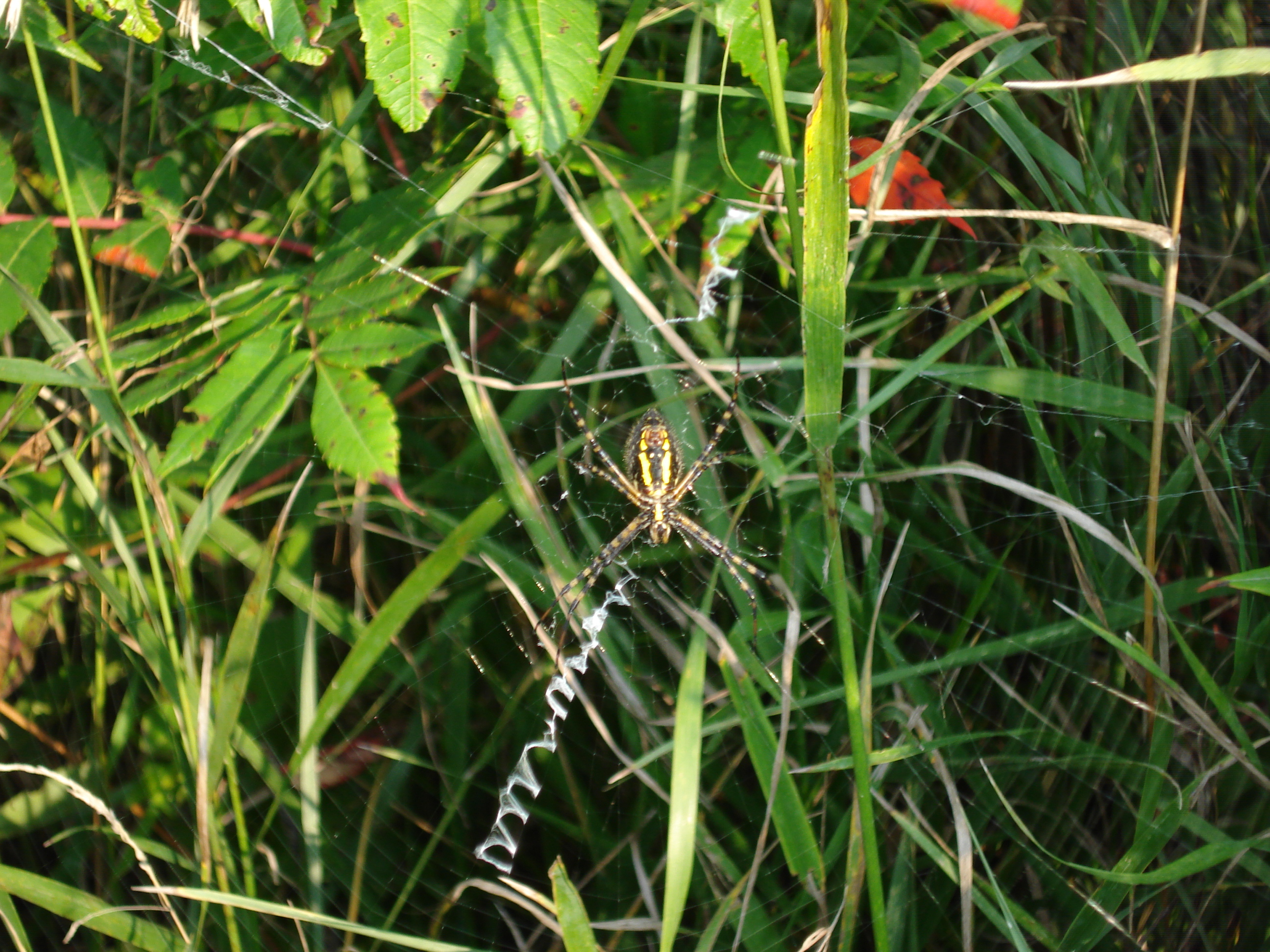
Writing spider on stabilimentum in Iowa

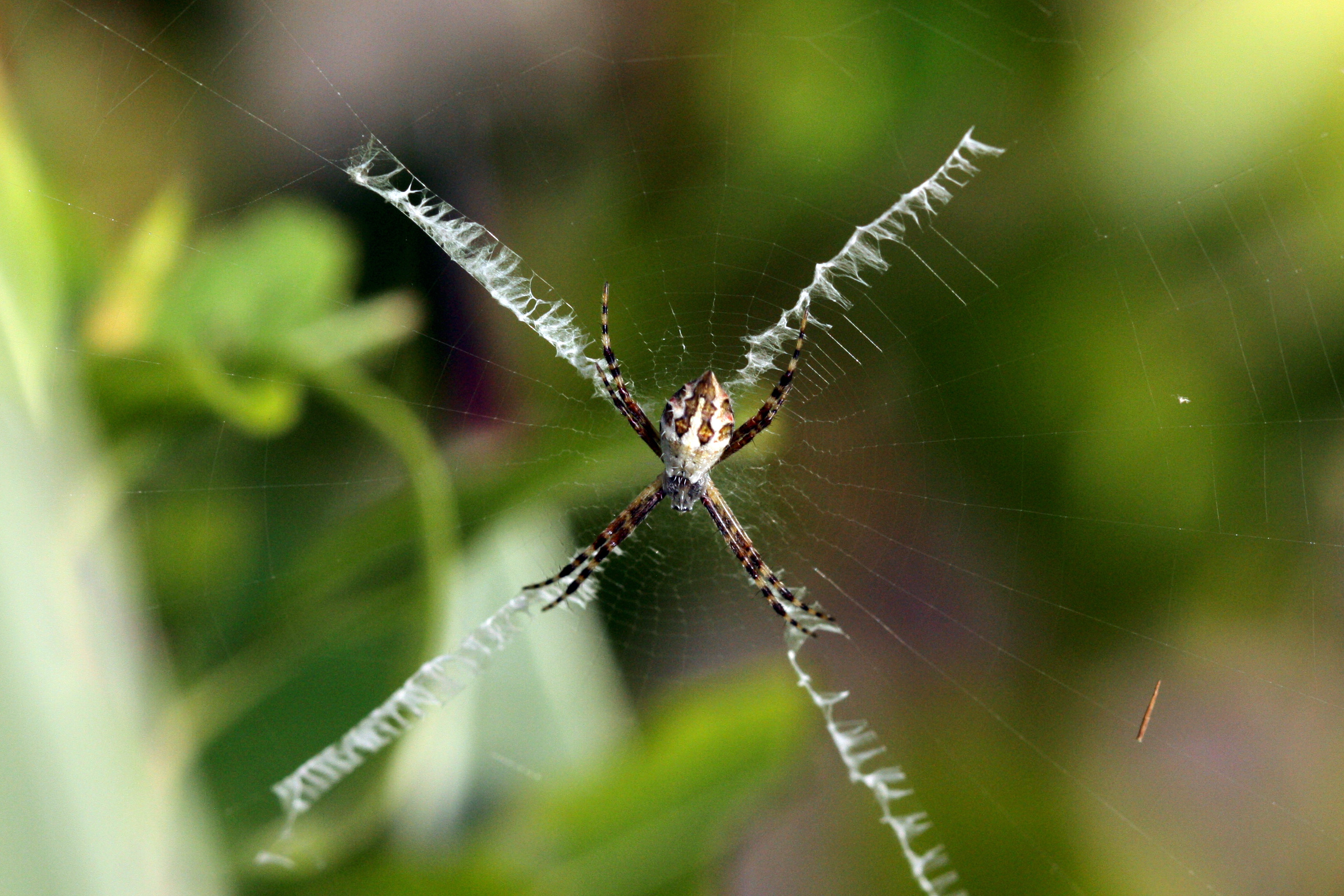
Silver argiope (A. argentata) in Jamaica

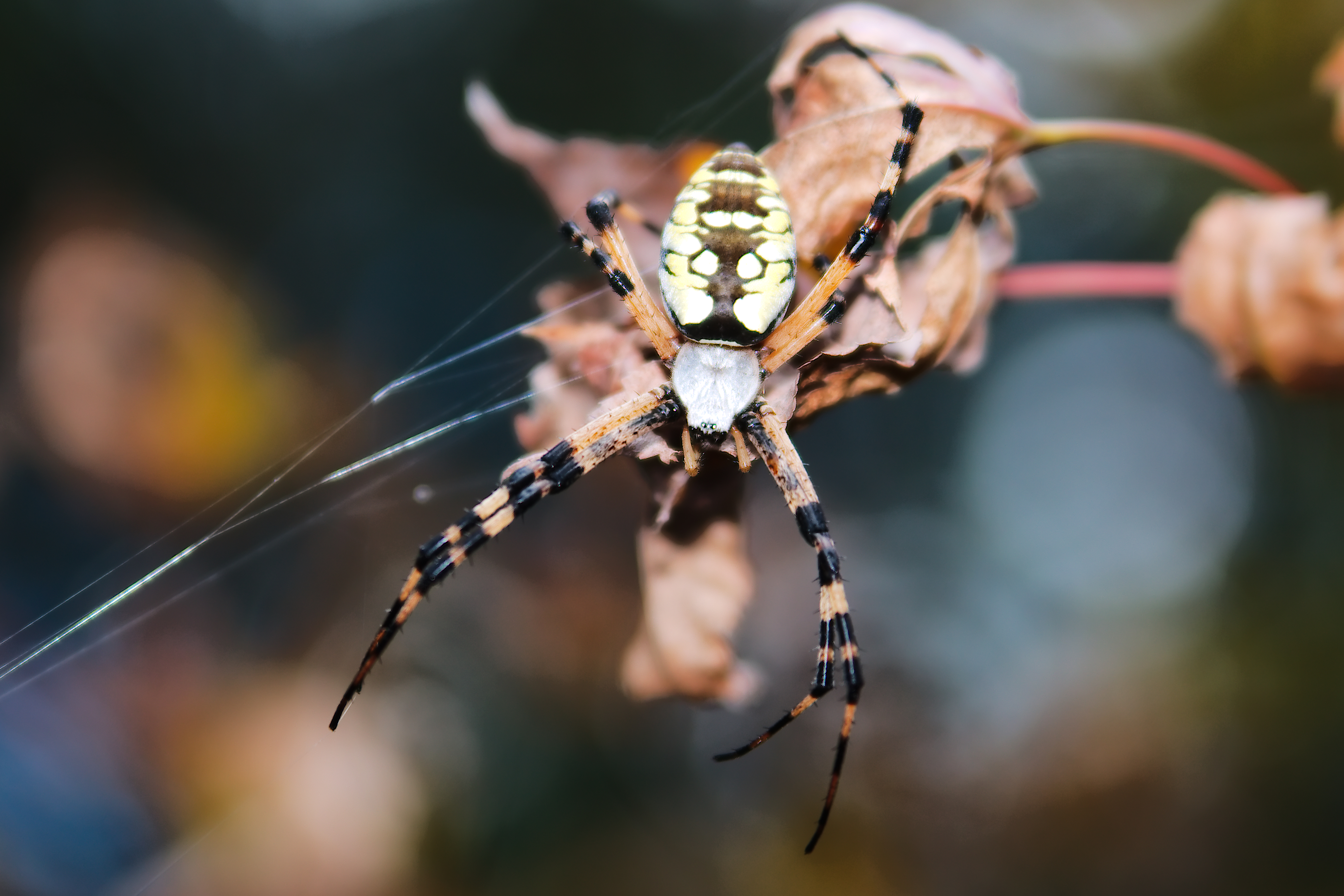
Writing spider in South Carolina

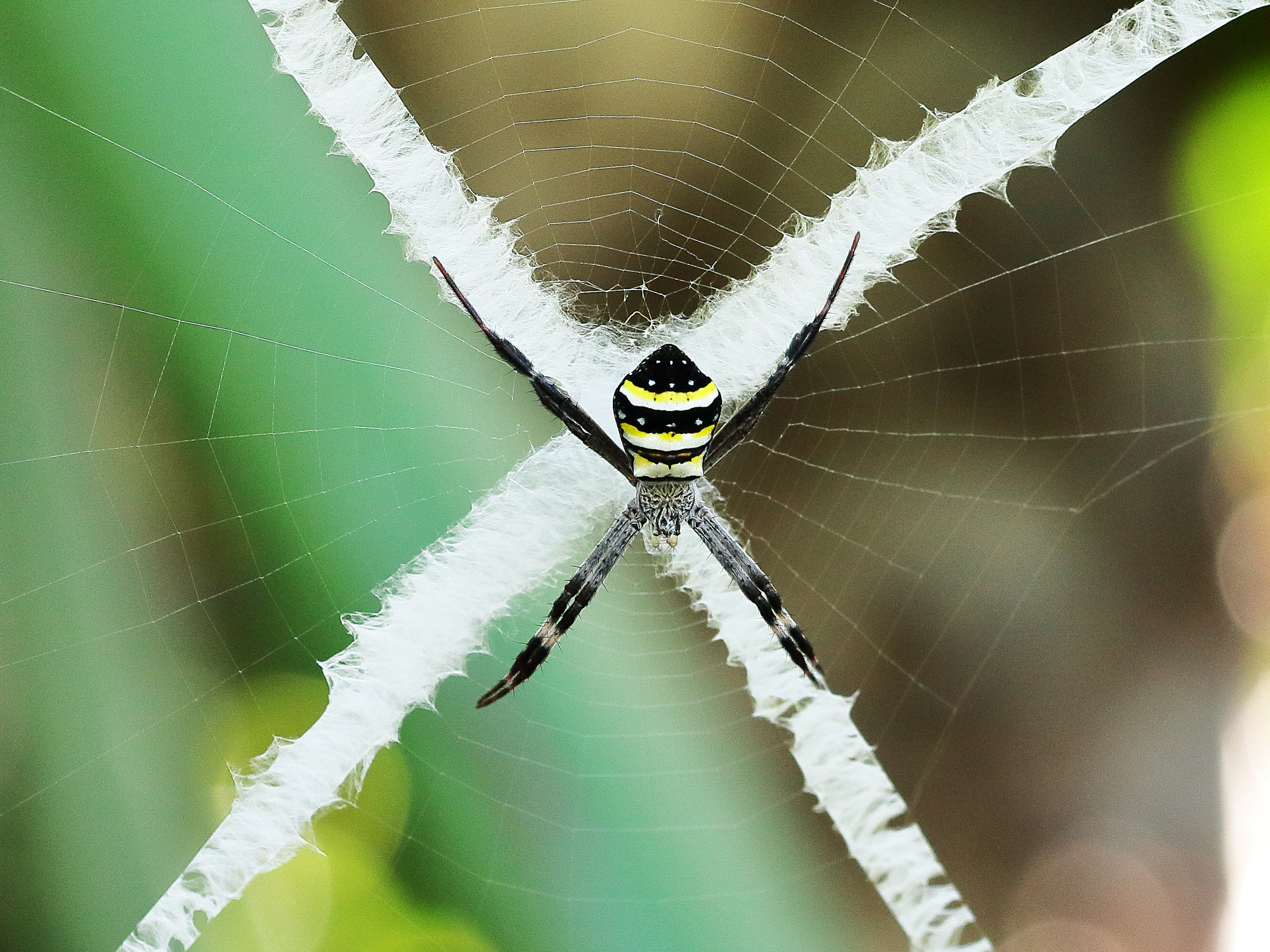
St Andrew's cross spider (A. keyserlingi) from Australia

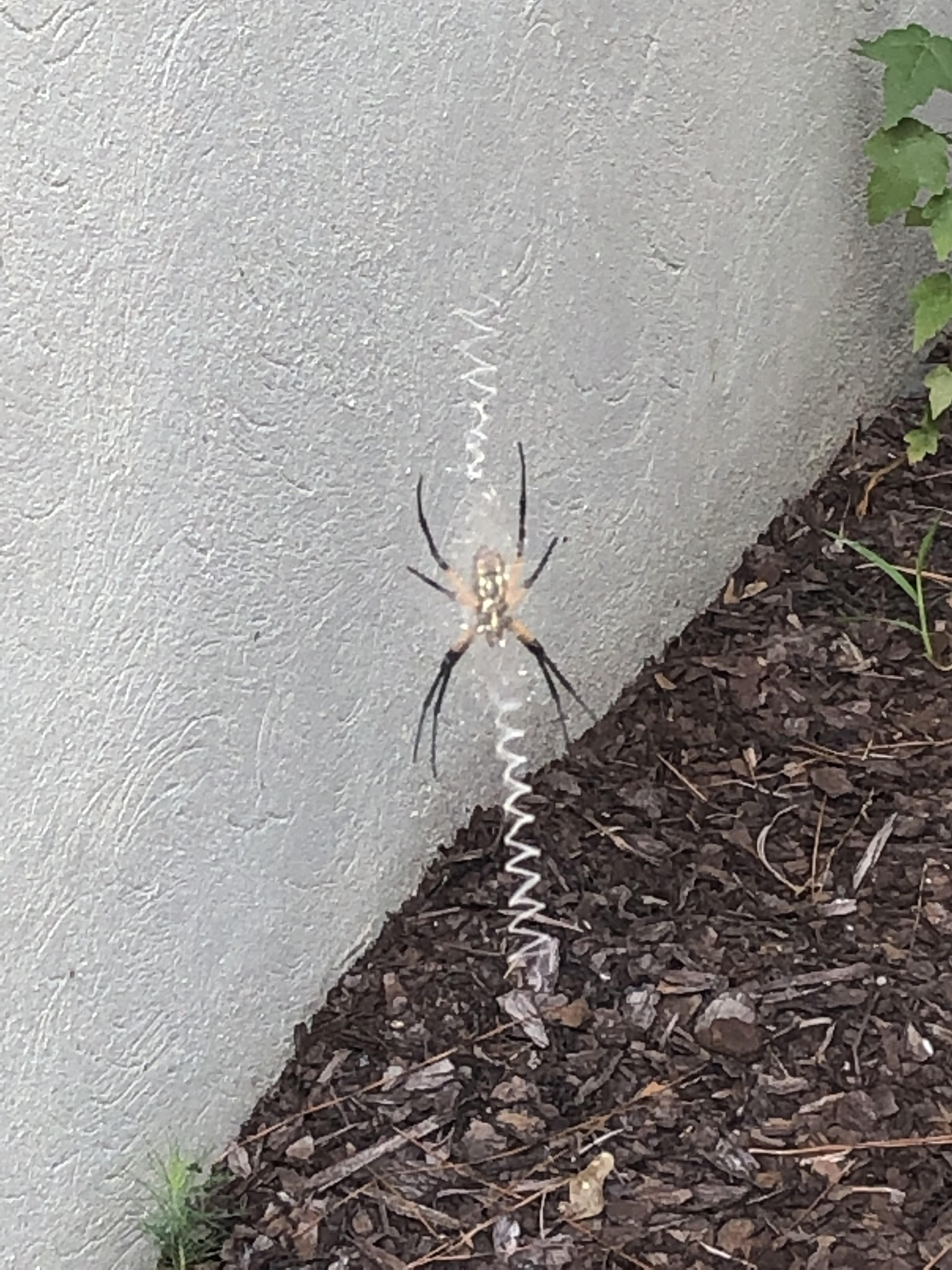
Argiope sp. from South Carolina

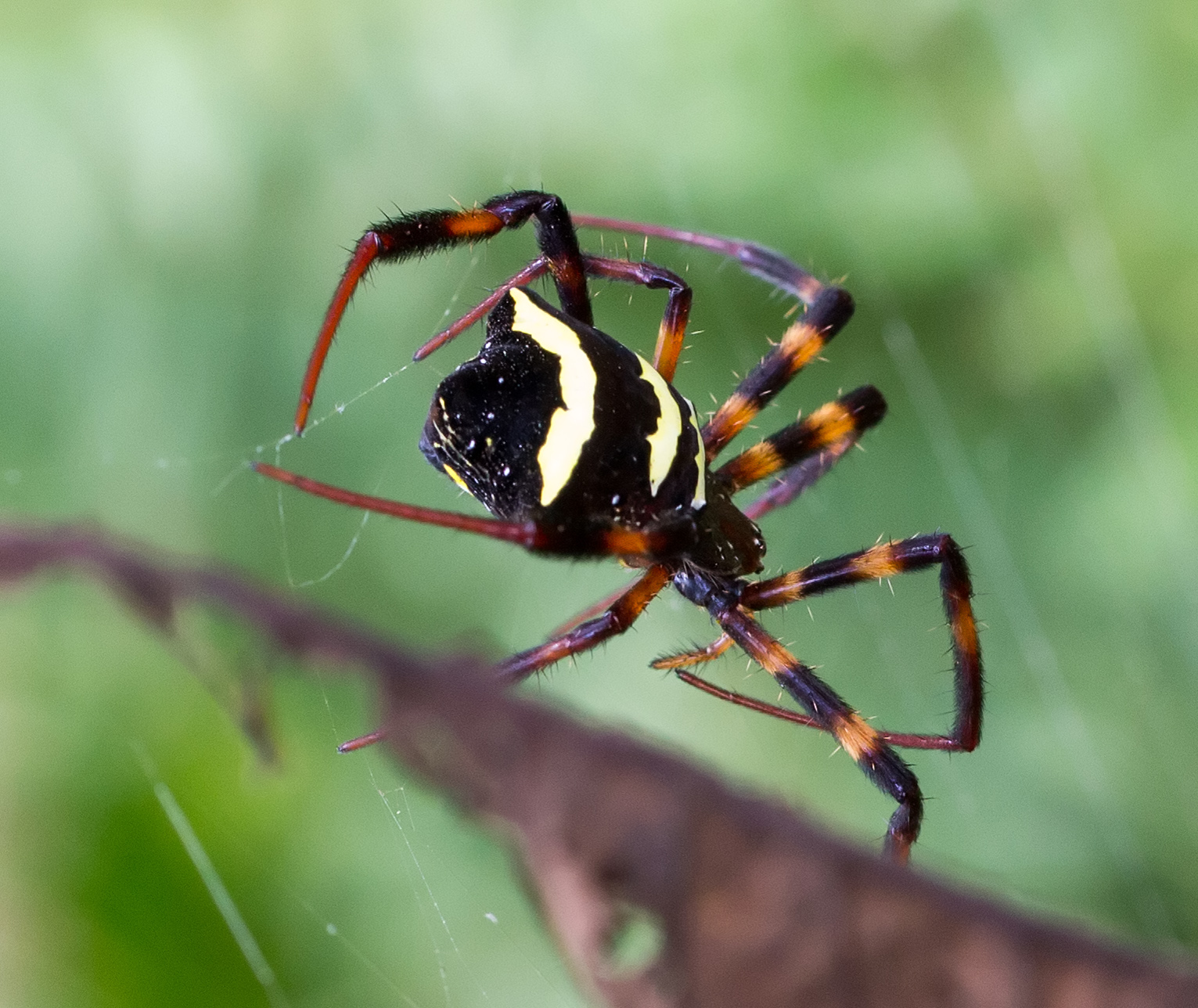
A. reinwardti from Kawah Putih, Indonesia

== Sources ==
- Audouin, Victor (1826) [title page 1809]. "Explication sommaire des planches d'arachnides de l'Egypte et de la Syrie". In Savigny, Jules-César (ed.). Description de l'Egypte : Histoire Naturelle (in French). Vol. 1 (1st [Imperial] ed.). pp. 99–186. (The actual date of publication to be used in zoological nomenclature is explained in Tollitt, M.E. (1986). "Dates and authorship of the text volumes of the Histoire Naturelle section of Savigny's Description de l'Egypte. Z.N.(S.) 2515". Bulletin of Zoological Nomenclature. 43: 107–112. doi:10.5962/bhl.part.388.)
- Audouin, Victor (1827). "Explication sommaire des planches d'arachnides de l'Egypte et de la Syrie". In Savigny, Jules-César (ed.). Description de l'Egypte : Histoire Naturelle (in French). Vol. 22 (2nd [Panckoucke] ed.). pp. 291–430.
- Blamires, Sean J.; Hochuli, Dieter F. & Thompson, Michael B. (2007). "Does decoration building influence antipredator responses in an orb-web spider (Argiope keyserlingi) in its natural habitat?". Australian Journal of Zoology. 55: 1–7. doi:10.1071/ZO06098.
- Fromhage, L.; Uhl, G. & Schneider, J. (2003). "Fitness consequences of sexual cannibalism in female Argiope bruennichi". Behavioral Ecology and Sociobiology. 55 (1): 60–64. Bibcode:2003BEcoS..55...60F. doi:10.1007/s00265-003-0656-6. S2CID 9215208.
- Timm, Robert M. & Losilla, Mauricio (2007). "Orb-weaving spider, Argiope savignyi (Araneidae), predation on the proboscis bat Rhynchonycteris naso (Emballonuridae)" (PDF). Caribbean Journal of Science. 43 (2): 282–284. doi:10.18475/cjos.v43i2.a1. hdl:1808/4463. S2CID 85919783. Archived (PDF) from the original on 2022-10-09.
