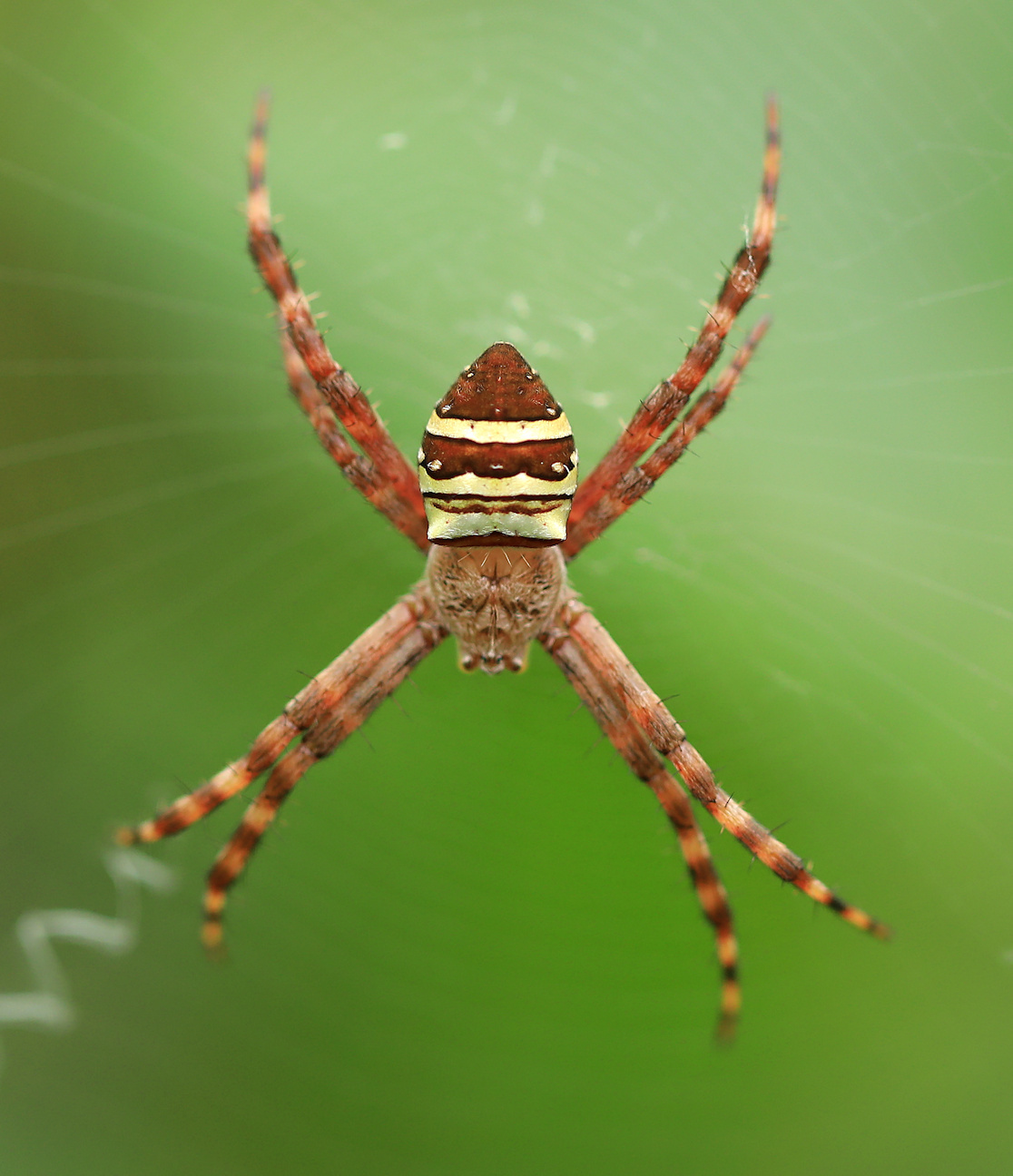

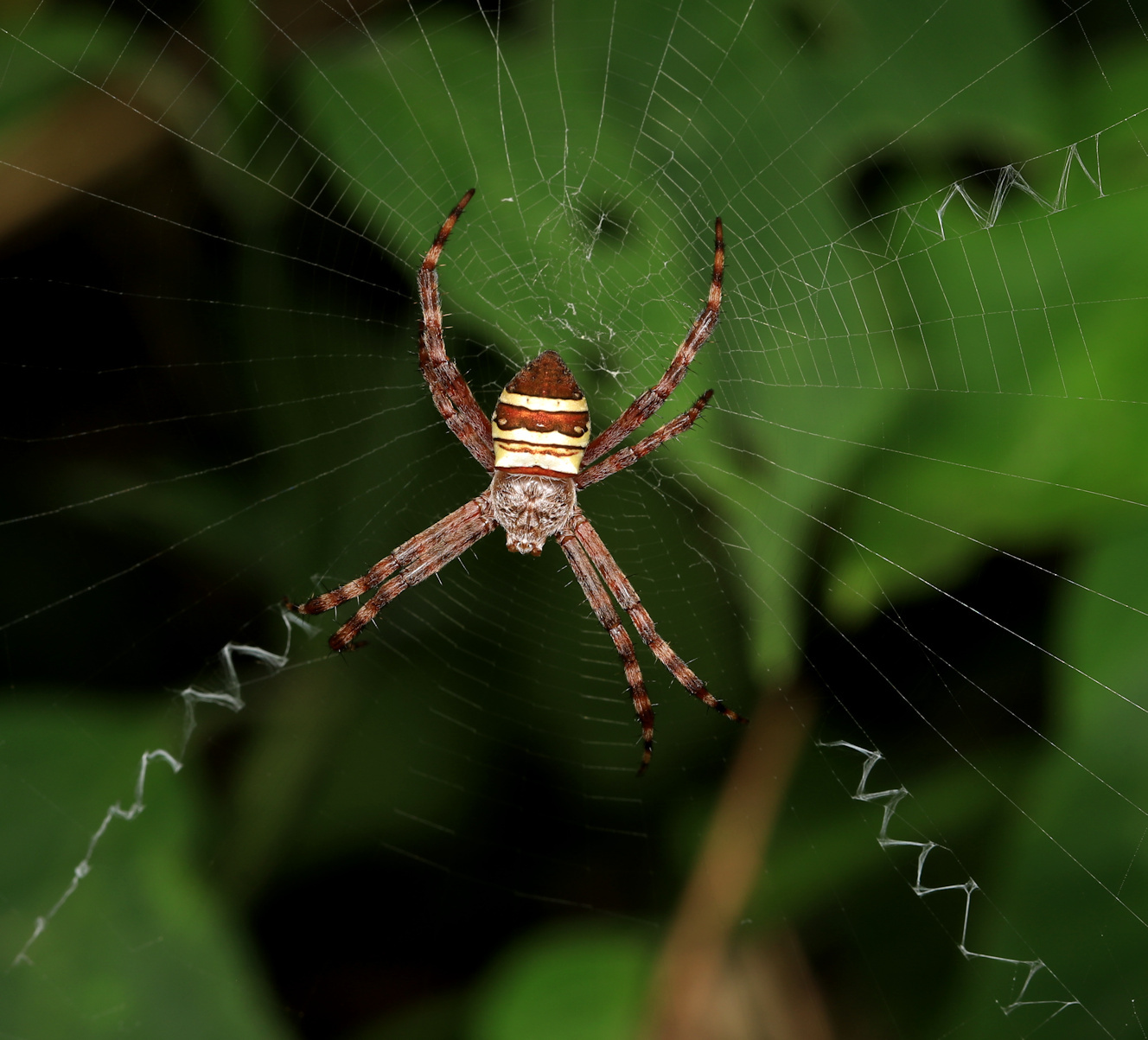

Scientific classification
- Kingdom: Animalia
- Phylum: Arthropoda
- Subphylum: Chelicerata
- Class: Arachnida
- Order: Araneae
- Infraorder: Araneomorphae
- Family: Araneidae
- Genus: Argiope
- Species: A. aurocincta

Binomial name
- Argiope aurocincta Pocock, 1898

= Argiope aurocincta =

Shield Garden Orb-Web Spider

Species of spider

Argiope aurocincta is a species of spider in the family Araneidae. It is endemic to Africa and is commonly known as the shield garden orb-web spider.

== Distribution ==
Argiope aurocincta has been collected from the Democratic Republic of Congo, Kenya, Tanzania, and South Africa. In South Africa, the species is known from six provinces at elevations ranging from 29 to 1,513 m above sea level.

== Habitat and ecology ==
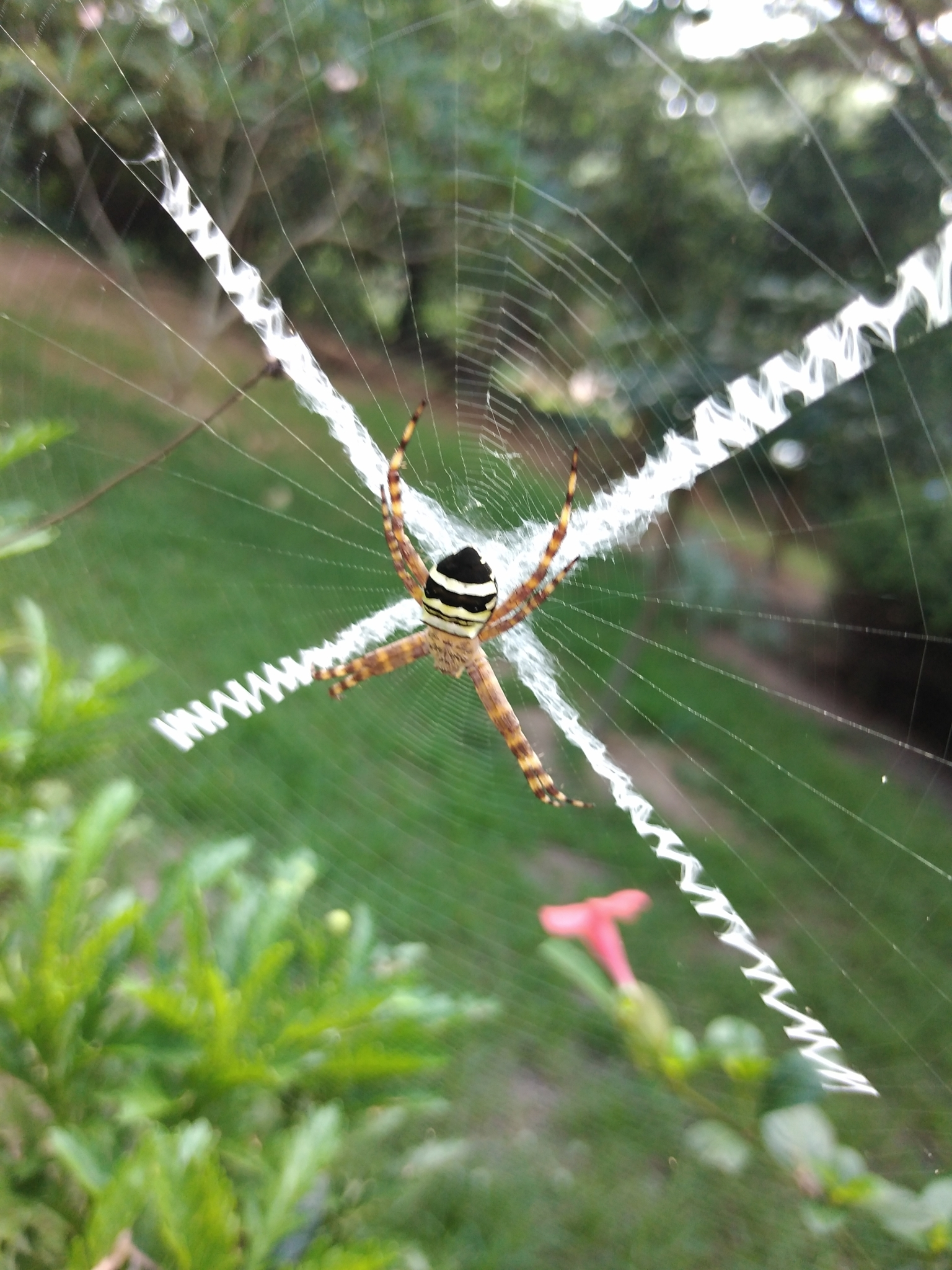
femae in web

The species constructs orb webs in open grassland areas, woodlands and gardens. The webs are usually placed low in shrubby vegetation, with the spider hanging at the hub head-down throughout the day, usually with an X-shaped stabilimentum. The species inhabits multiple biomes including Forest, Grassland, Indian Ocean Coastal Belt, Nama Karoo and Savanna.

== Conservation ==
Argiope aurocincta is listed as Least Concern by the South African National Biodiversity Institute due to its wide geographical range. The species is protected in 12 protected areas including Roodeplaatdam Nature Reserve, Ndumu Game Reserve, and Bontebok National Park.

== Taxonomy ==
The species was originally described by Pocock in 1898 from Kenya. It was revised by Bjørn in 1997 and is known only from the female.
