= Argiope levii =

Levi's Garden Orb-Web Spider

Conservation status
- Least Concern (SANBI Red List)

Scientific classification
- Kingdom: Animalia
- Phylum: Arthropoda
- Subphylum: Chelicerata
- Class: Arachnida
- Order: Araneae
- Infraorder: Araneomorphae
- Family: Araneidae
- Genus: Argiope
- Species: A. levii

Binomial name
- Argiope levii Bjørn, 1997

Species of spider

Argiope levii is a species of spider in the family Araneidae. It is endemic to Africa and is commonly known as Levi's garden orb-web spider.

== Distribution ==
Argiope levii is known from Kenya, Tanzania, and South Africa. In South Africa, the species is known from three provinces at elevations ranging from 20 to 1,412 m above sea level.

== Habitat and ecology ==
The species constructs orb webs in open grassland areas and gardens. The webs are usually placed low in shrubby vegetation sturdy enough to bear their weight. The spider hangs at the hub head-down throughout the day, with webs sometimes decorated with a stabilimentum. The species inhabits Forest, Grassland and Savanna biomes.

== Conservation ==
Argiope levii is listed as Least Concern by the South African National Biodiversity Institute due to its wide geographical range. The species is protected in several reserves including Lake Sibaya, Ndumo Game Reserve, and Lekgalameetse Nature Reserve.

== Etymology ==
The species is named after Herbert Walter Levi, an American arachnologist who made significant contributions to the study of spiders.

== Taxonomy ==
The species was described by Bjørn in 1997 from Tanzania. It is possibly under-collected and suspected to occur in countries between its known distribution points.
