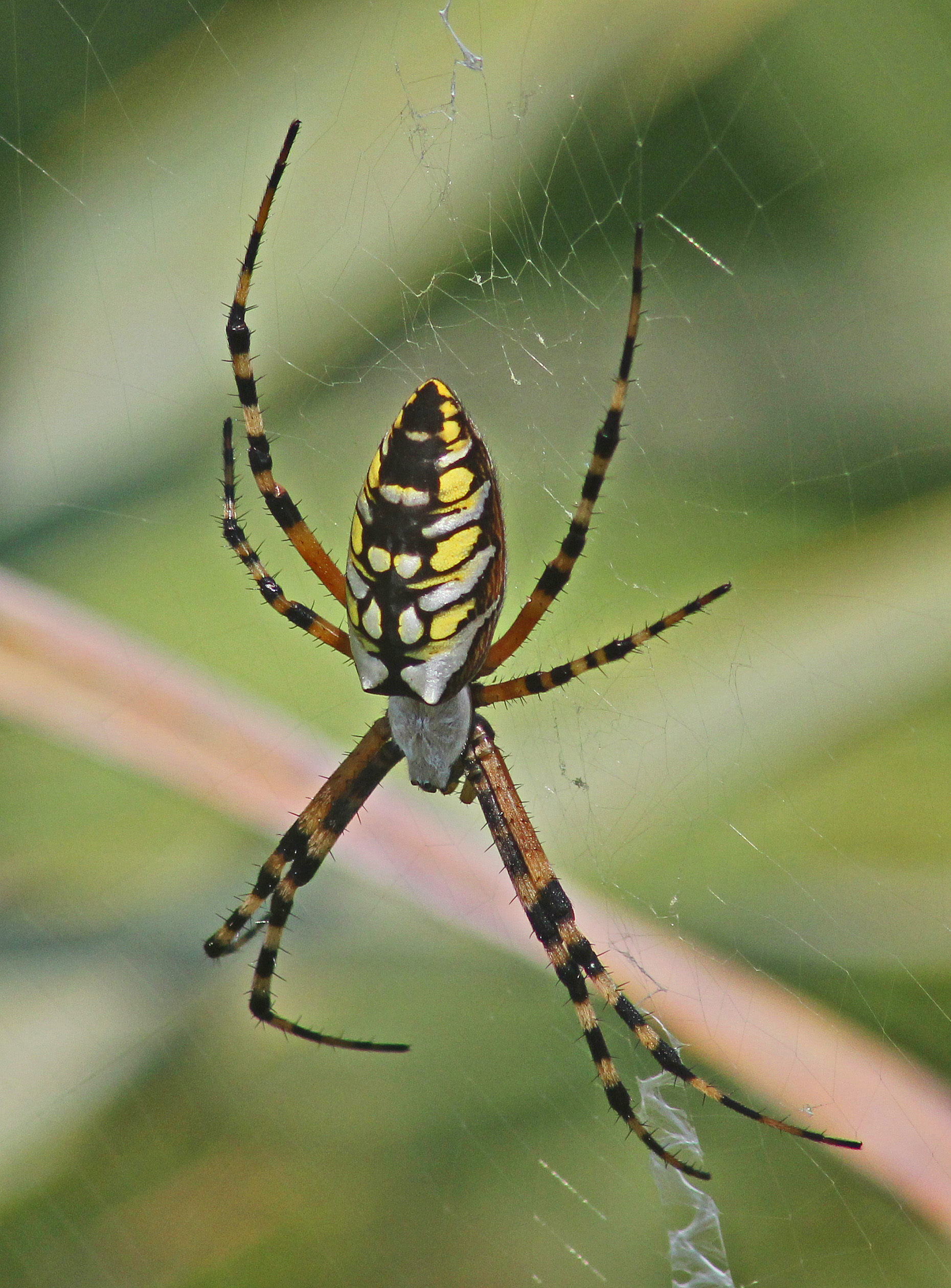

Conservation status
- Secure (NatureServe)

Scientific classification
- Kingdom: Animalia
- Phylum: Arthropoda
- Subphylum: Chelicerata
- Class: Arachnida
- Order: Araneae
- Infraorder: Araneomorphae
- Family: Araneidae
- Genus: Argiope
- Species: A. aurantia

Binomial name
- Argiope aurantia Lucas, 1833

Synonyms
- Nephila vestita C.L. Koch, 1838; Epeira aurantia Lucas, 1840; Epeira cophinaria Walckenaer, 1841; Epeira ambitoria Walckenaer, 1841; Epeira riparia Hentz, 1847; Epeira sutrix Hentz, 1847; Argiope riparia McCook, 1882; Argiope personata O. Pickard-Cambridge, 1893; Argiope cophinaria McCook, 1894; Argiope godmani O. Pickard-Cambridge, 1898; Miranda cophinaria F.O. Pickard-Cambridge, 1903

= Argiope aurantia =

Yellow garden spider

Species of spider

Argiope aurantia is a species of spider, commonly known as the yellow garden spider, black and yellow garden spider, golden garden spider, writing spider, zigzag spider, zipper spider, black and yellow argiope, corn spider, Steeler spider, or McKinley spider. The species was first described by Hippolyte Lucas in 1833. It is common in the contiguous United States, Hawaii, southern Canada, Mexico, and Central America. It has distinctive yellow and black markings on the abdomen and a mostly white cephalothorax. Its scientific Latin name translates to "gilded silver-face" (the genus name Argiope meaning "silver-face", while the specific epithet aurantia means "gilded"). The body length of males ranges from 5–9 mm (0.20–0.35 in); females range from 19–28 mm (0.75–1.10 in). The average female body mass is about 752.0 mg. These spiders may bite if disturbed or harassed, but the venom is harmless to non-allergic humans, roughly equivalent to a bumblebee sting in intensity.

== Habitat ==
Yellow garden spiders often build webs in areas adjacent to open sunny fields where they stay concealed and protected from the wind. The spider can also be found along the eaves of houses and outbuildings or in any tall vegetation where they can securely stretch a web.

Female Argiope aurantia spiders tend to be somewhat local, often staying in one place throughout much of their lifetime.

The web of the yellow garden spider is distinctive: a circular shape up to 2 feet (60 cm) in diameter, with a dense zigzag of silk, known as a stabilimentum, in the center. The purpose of the stabilimentum is disputed. It is possible that it acts as camouflage for the spider lurking in the web's center, but it may also attract insect prey, or even warn birds of the presence of the otherwise difficult-to-see web. Only those spiders that are active during the day construct stabilimenta in their webs.

To construct the web, several radial lines are stretched among four or five anchor points that can be more than three feet apart. The radial lines meet at a central point. The spider makes a frame with several more radial lines and then fills the center with a spiral of silk, leaving a 7.9–9.5 mm (0.31–0.37 in) gap between the spiral rings, starting with the innermost ring and moving outward in a clockwise motion. To ensure that the web is taut, the spider bends the radial lines slightly together while applying the silk spiral. The female builds a substantially larger web than the male's small zigzag web, often found nearby.

The spider occupies the center of the web, usually facing straight down, waiting for prey to become ensnared in it. If disturbed by a possible predator, she may drop from the web and hide on the ground nearby. The web normally remains in one location for the entire summer, but spiders can change locations, usually early in the season, perhaps to find better protection or better hunting.

The yellow garden spider can oscillate her web vigorously while she remains firmly attached in the center. This action might prevent predators like wasps and birds from drawing a good bead, and also fully entangle an insect before it cuts itself loose. However, in a case observed in Georgia, Davis witnessed a Vespa crabro fly into the spider's web and get tangled up. Upon looking closer, it was found that V. crabro was actually cutting free prey that had been caught in the A. aurantia web. In this case, A. aurantia did not interfere or fight with the European hornet, probably because it dropped from the web and hid nearby.

The yellow garden spider does not live in very dense location clusters like other orb spiders such as the golden orb web spider. The yellow garden spider keeps a clean, orderly web in comparison to the cluttered series of webs built and abandoned by groups of golden orb spiders.

== Distribution ==
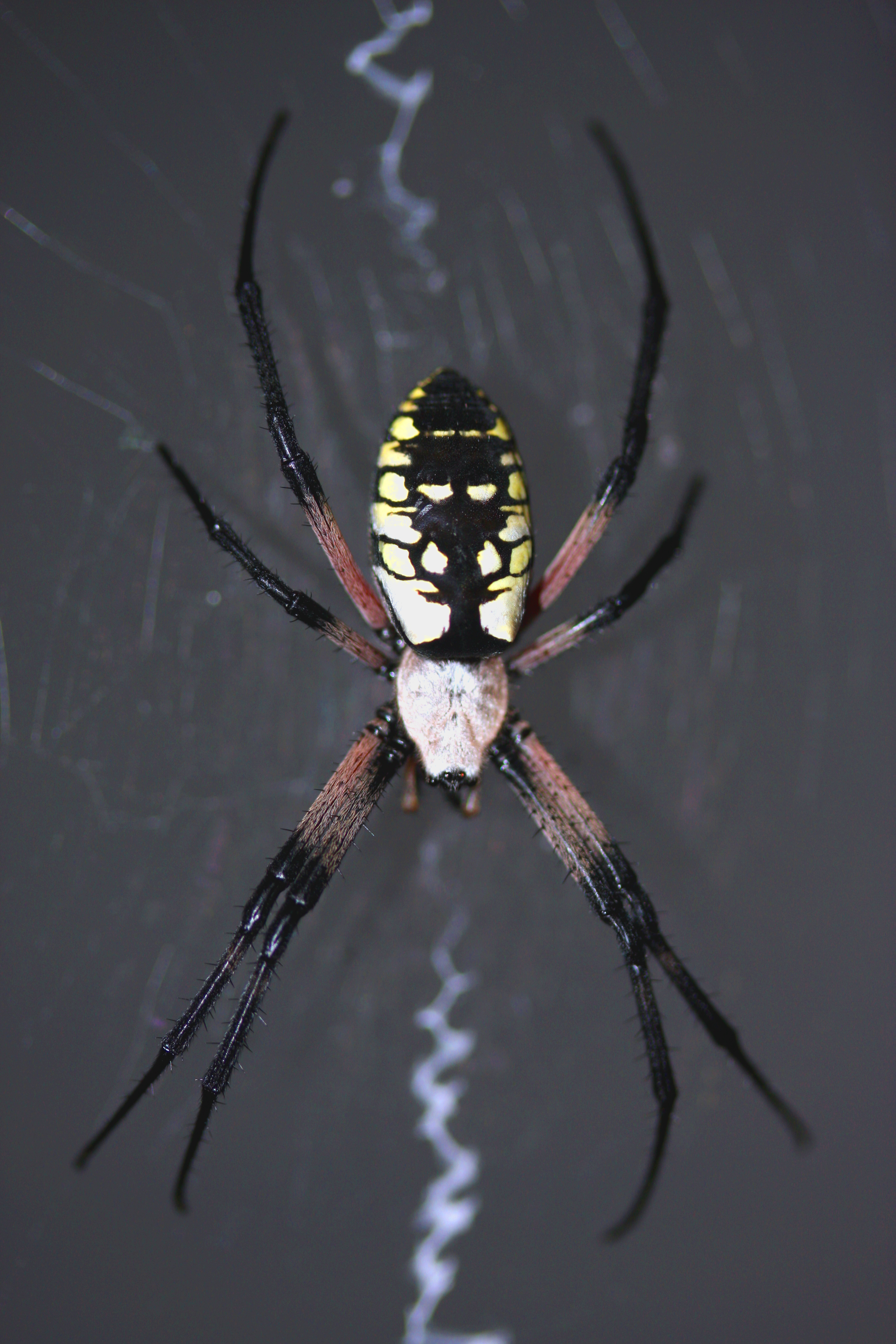
Female in web

This spider is found from Canada to Colombia, but less so in the basin and mountain areas of the Rockies.

== Venom ==
Argiope spiders are not aggressive. They might bite if grabbed, but other than for defense they do not attack large animals. Their venom often contains a library of polyamine toxins with potential as therapeutic agents. Notable among these is the argiotoxin ArgTX-636.

A bite by Argiope aurantia is comparable to a bee sting, with redness and swelling. For a healthy adult, a bite is not considered an issue. Though these spiders are not aggressive, people who are very young, elderly, or who have compromised immune systems should exercise caution, just as they would around a beehive or a hornet nest.

== Reproduction ==
Yellow garden spiders breed twice a year. The males roam in search of a female, building a small web near or actually in the female's web, then court the female by plucking strands on her web. Often, when the male approaches the female, he has a safety drop line ready, in case she attacks him. The male uses the palpal bulbs on his pedipalps to transfer sperm to the female. After inserting the second palpal bulb, the male dies, and is sometimes then eaten by the female.

The female lays her eggs at night on a sheet of silky material, then covers them with another layer of silk, then a protective brownish silk. She then uses her legs to form the sheet into a ball with an upturned neck. Egg sacs range from 5/8" to 1" in diameter. The location of the egg sac varies. She sometimes suspends the egg sac near her web or places it several feet from the web. Each spider produces from one to four sacs with perhaps over a thousand eggs inside each.

Females produce clutches containing approximately 978 eggs. Each egg measures about 0.92 mm in diameter and weighs around 0.46 mg.

In the spring, the young spiders exit the sac. They are so tiny that they look like dust gathered inside the silk mesh. Some of the spiderlings remain nearby, but others exude a strand of silk that gets caught by the breeze, carrying the spiderling to a more distant area.

== Eating habits ==
Females of the species are the most commonly seen in gardens. Their webs are usually characterized by a zigzag-shaped stabilimentum (an extra-thick line of silk) in the middle extending vertically. The spiders spend most of their time in their webs, waiting for prey to become ensnared. When prey becomes caught in the web, the spider may undulate the web back and forth to further trap the insect. When the prey is secure, the spider kills it by injecting its venom and then wraps the prey in a cocoon of silk for later consumption (typically 1–4 hours later). Prey includes small vertebrates, such as geckos and green anoles, as well as insects.

== Gallery ==
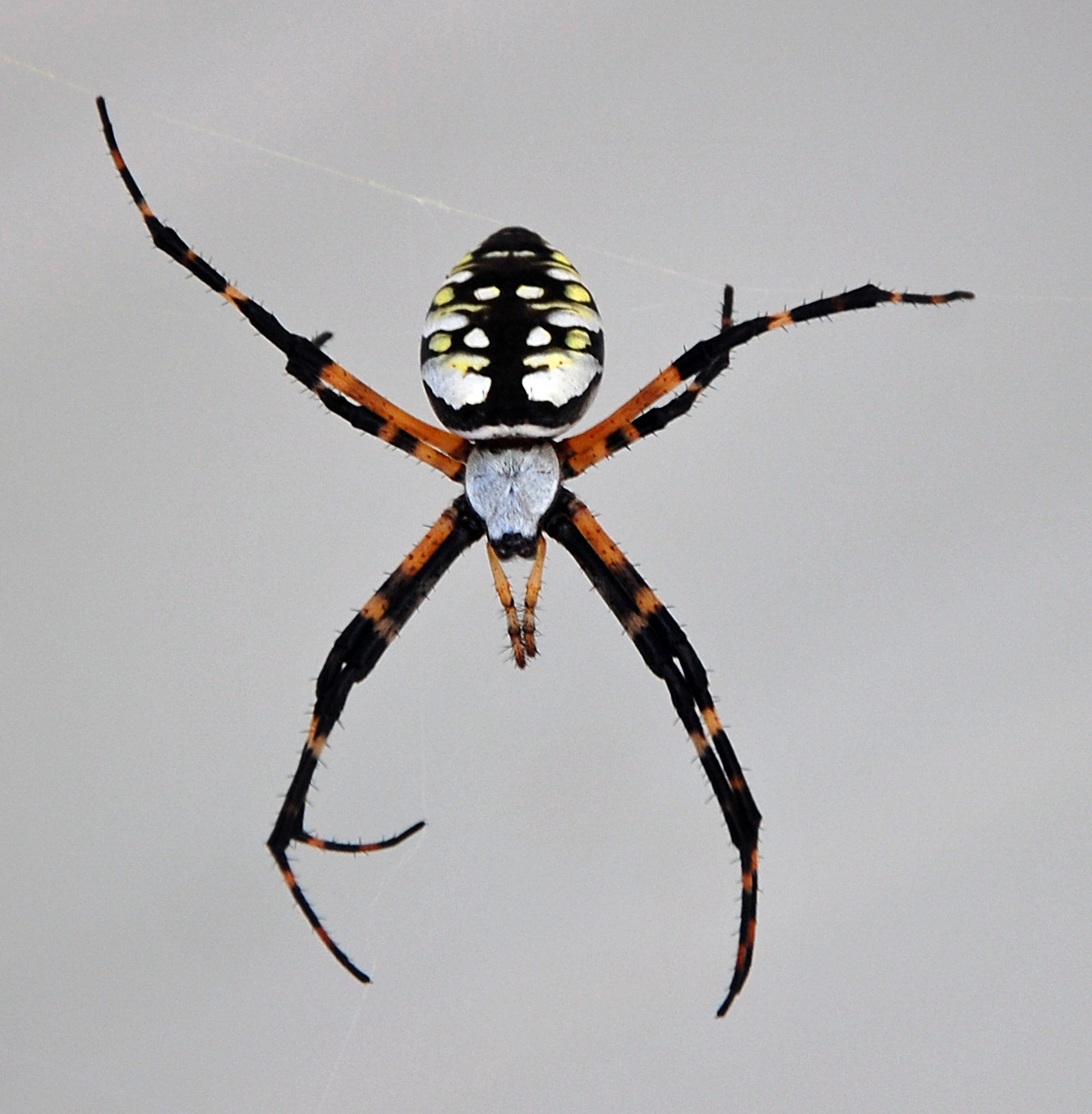
Female

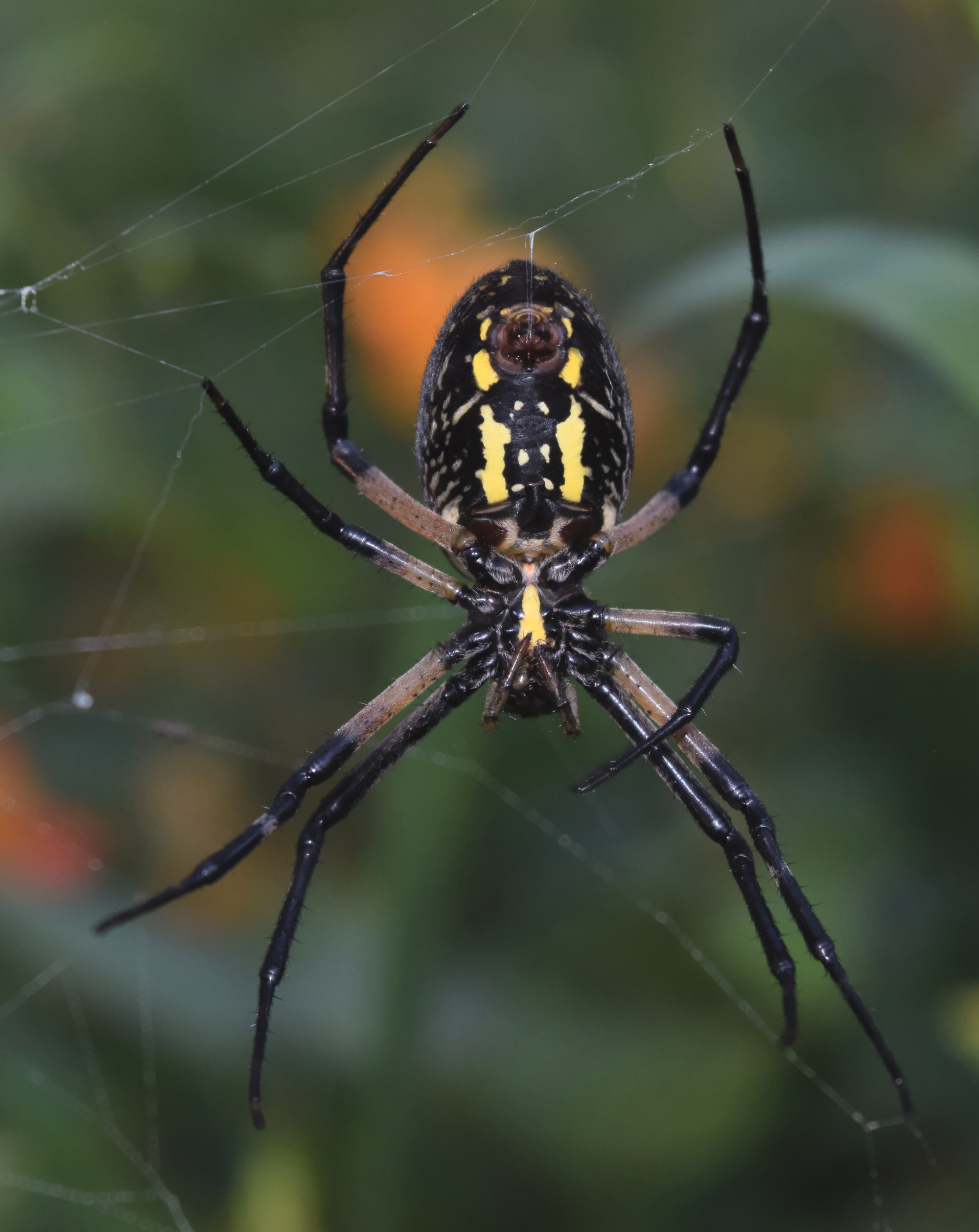
Ventral view

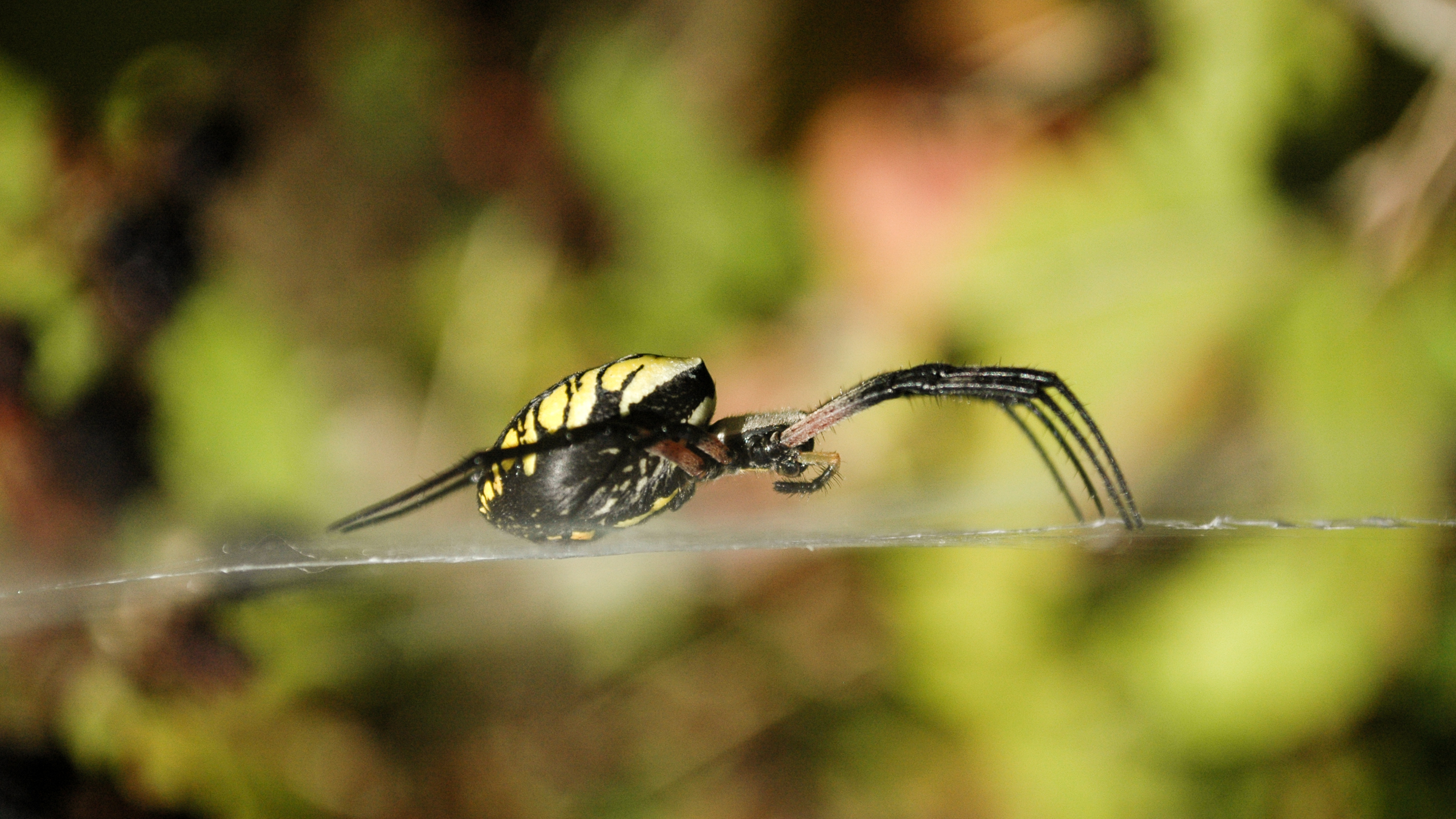
Side view

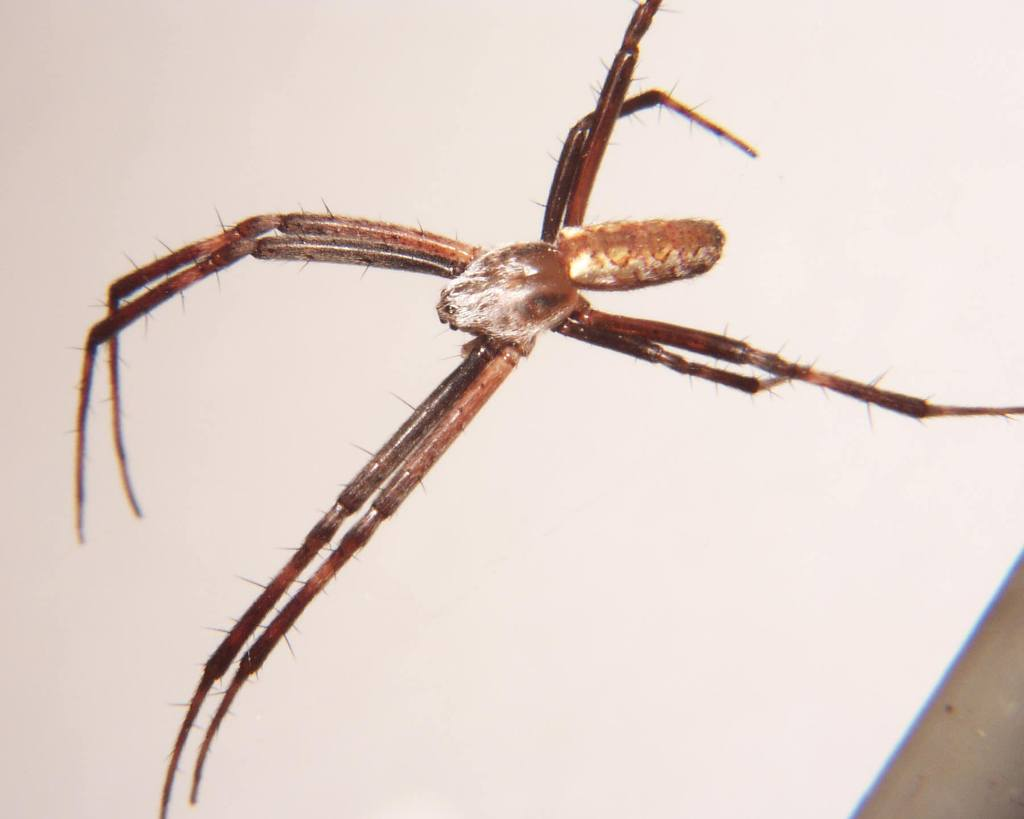
Male

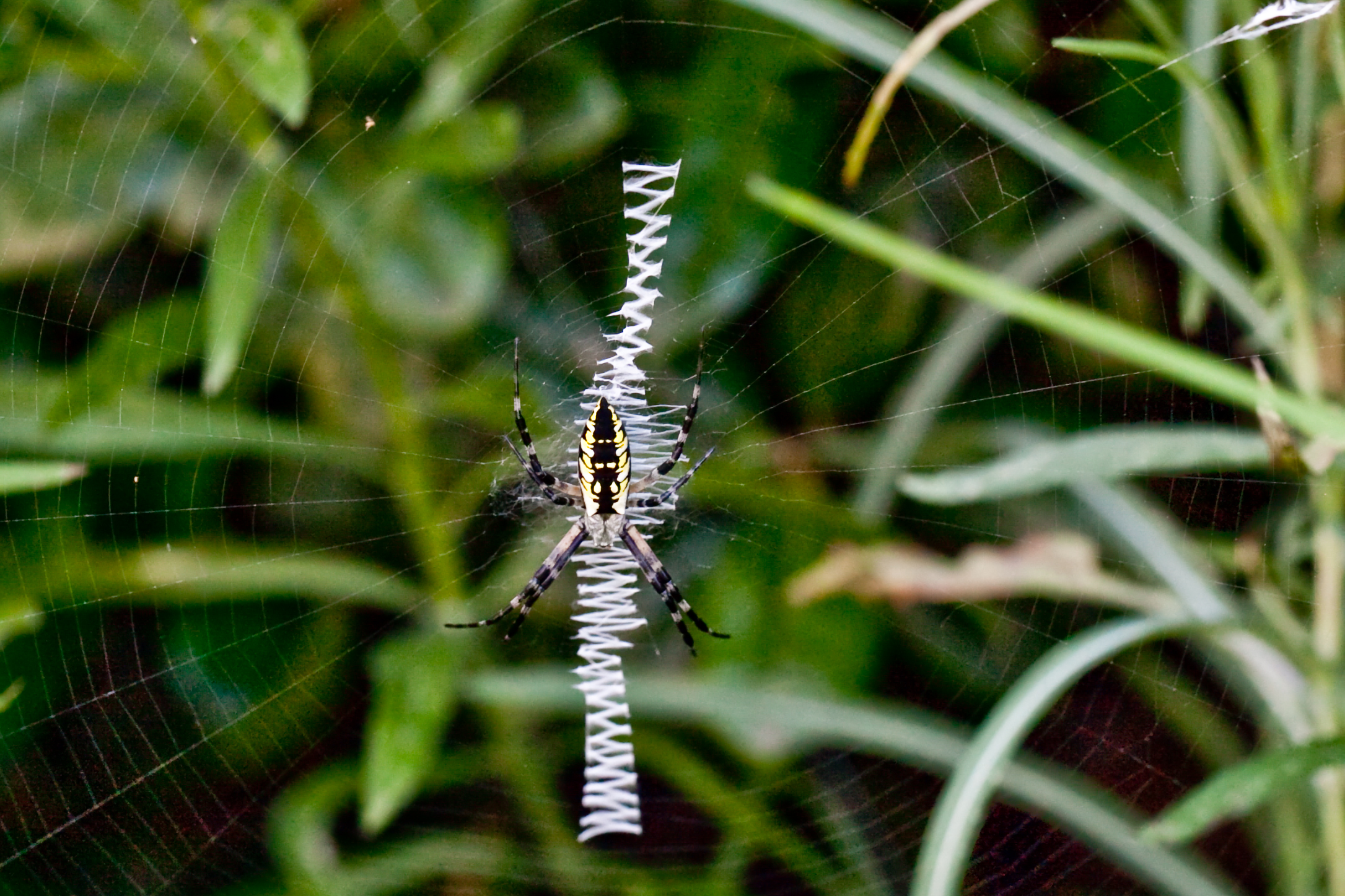
In web, displaying the characteristic zig-zag stabilimentum

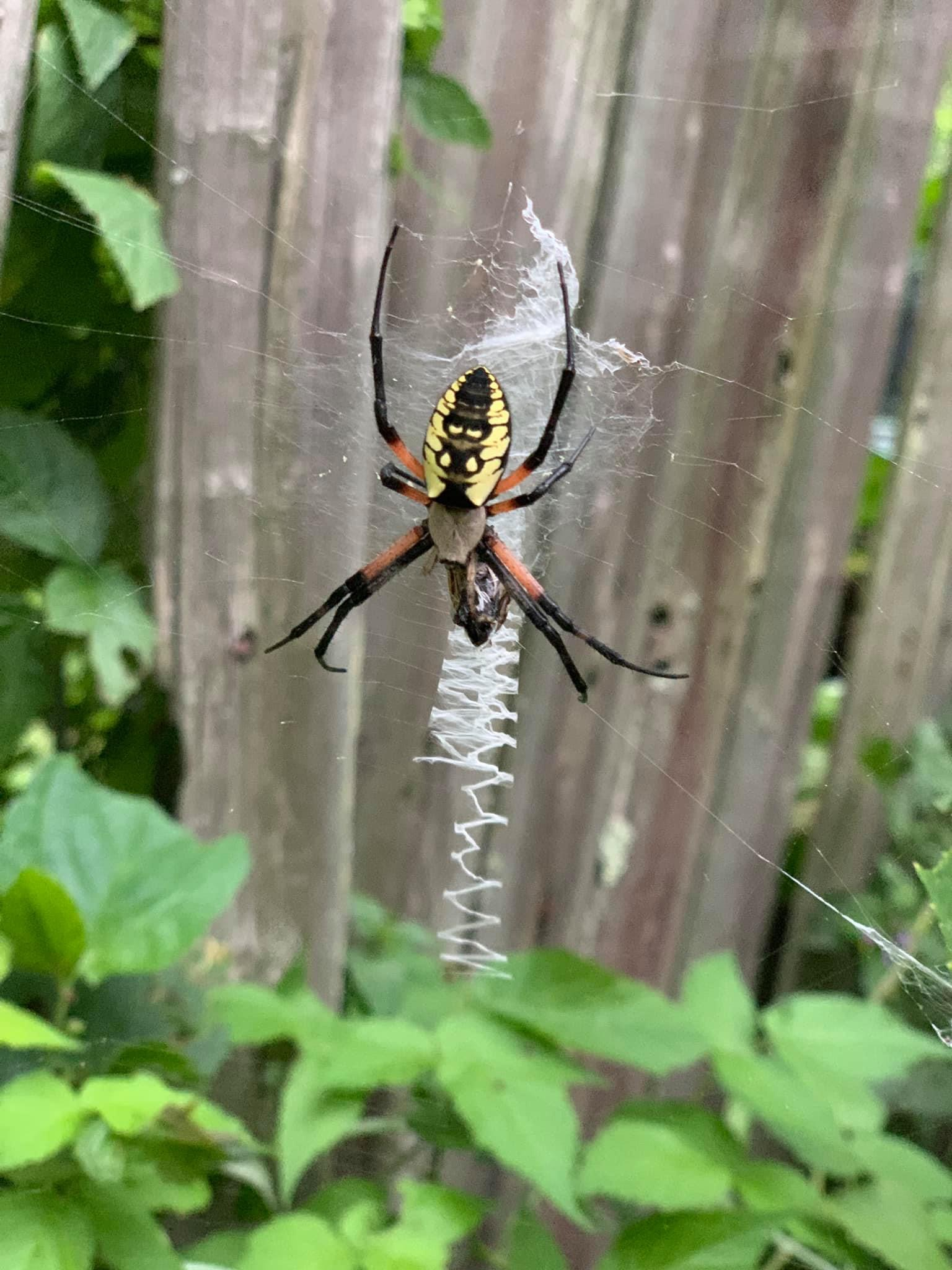
In Port Jervis, New York

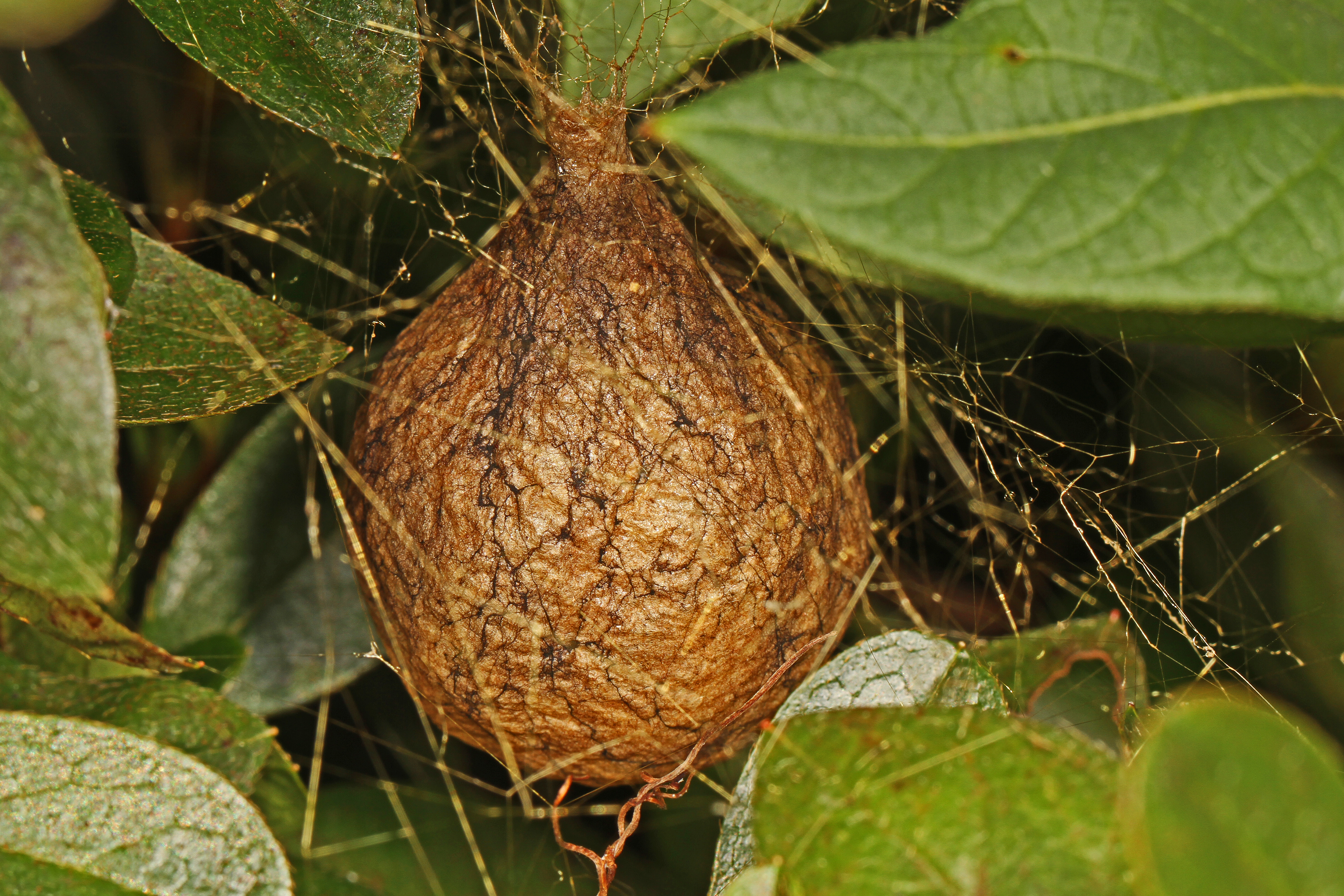
Egg sac

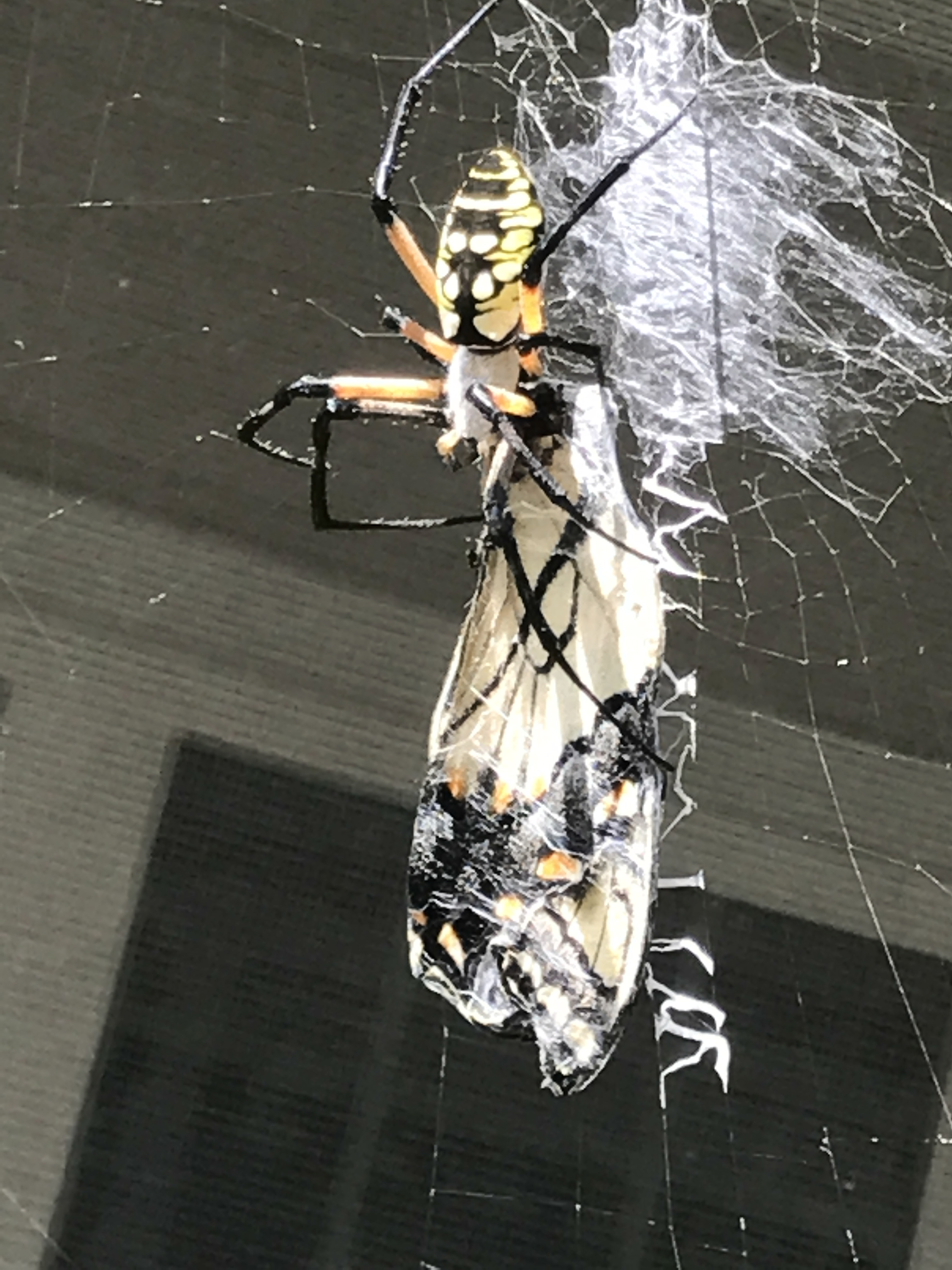
Eating a swallowtail butterfly in Holly Springs, North Carolina

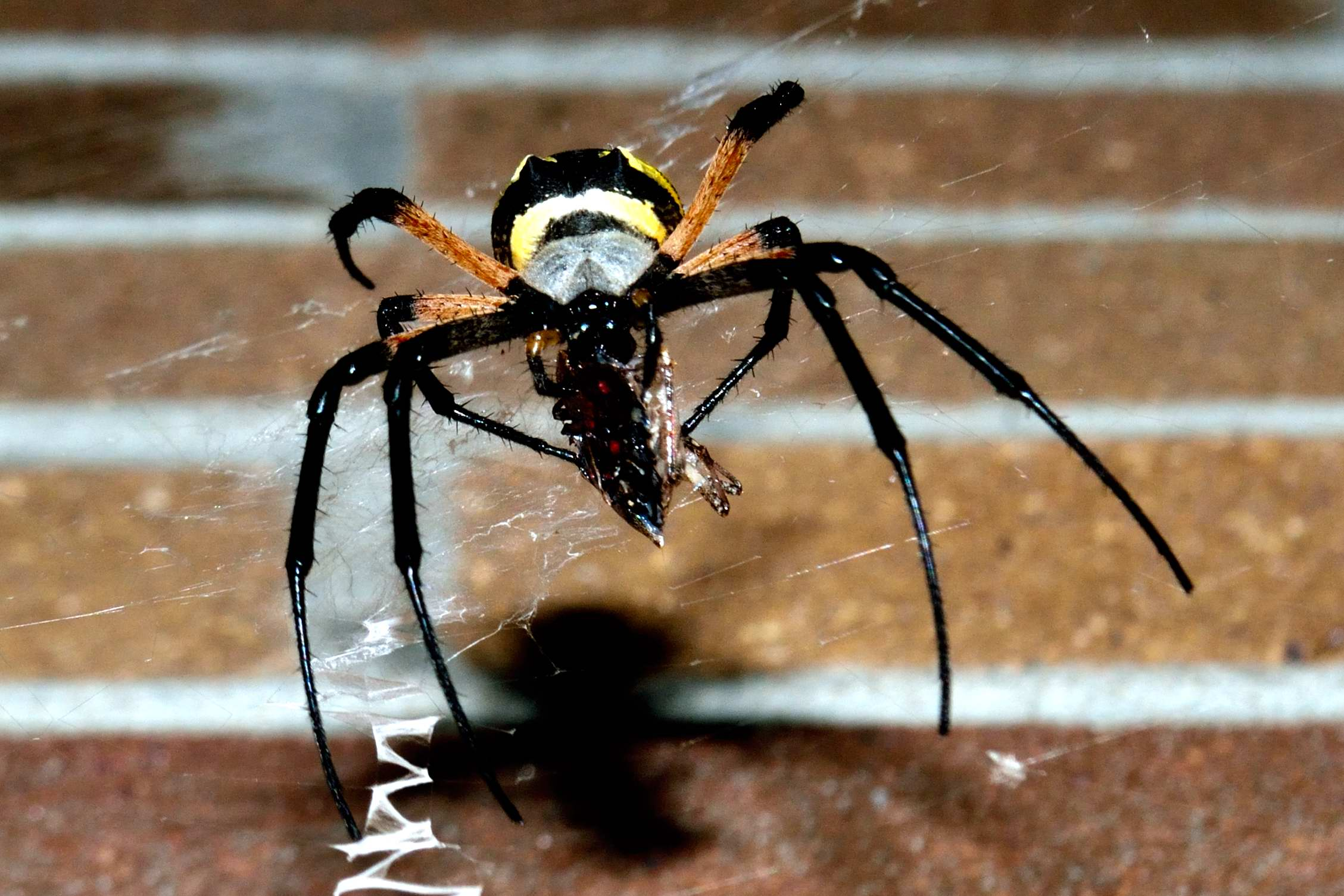
Female consuming a moth

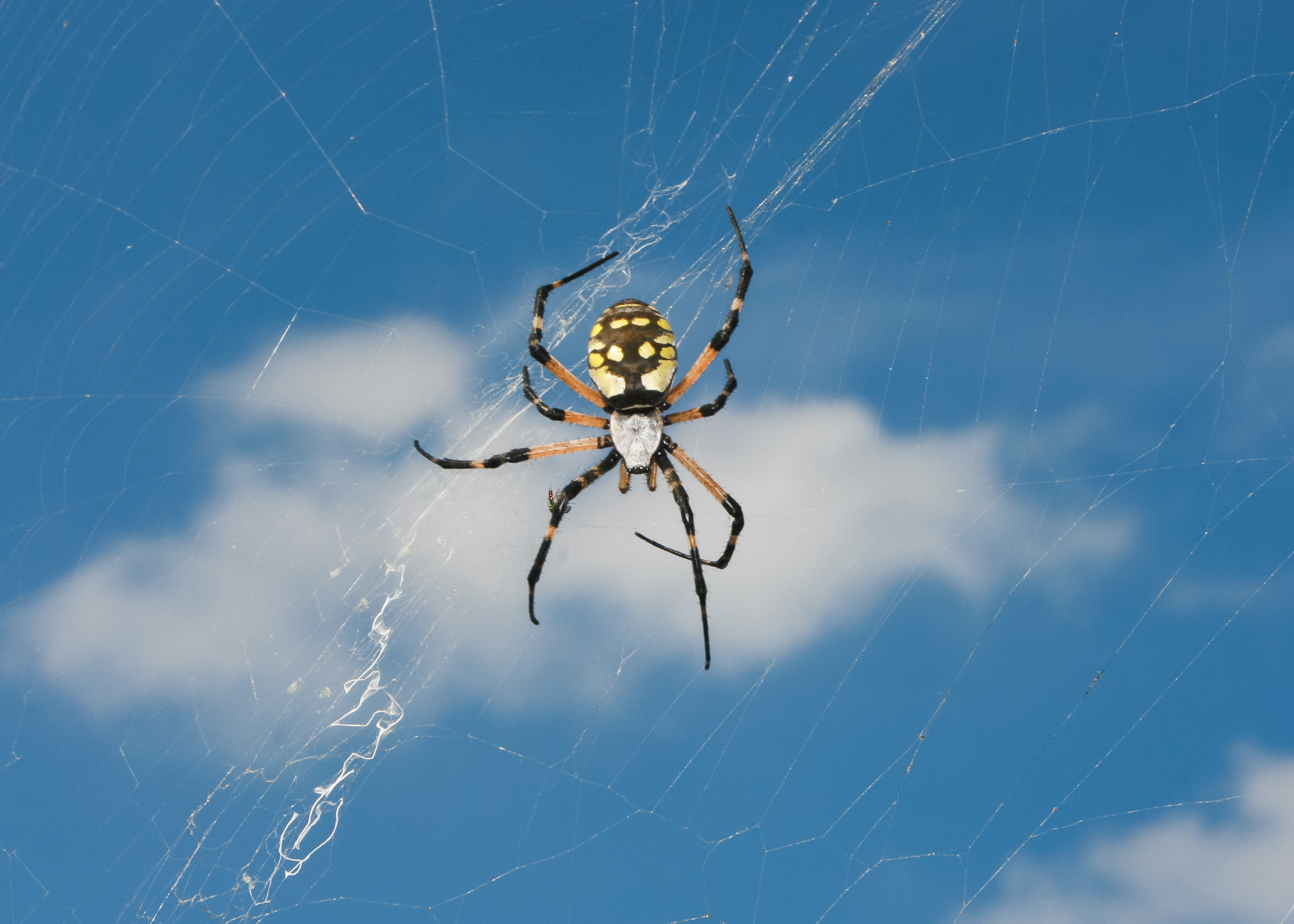
On web

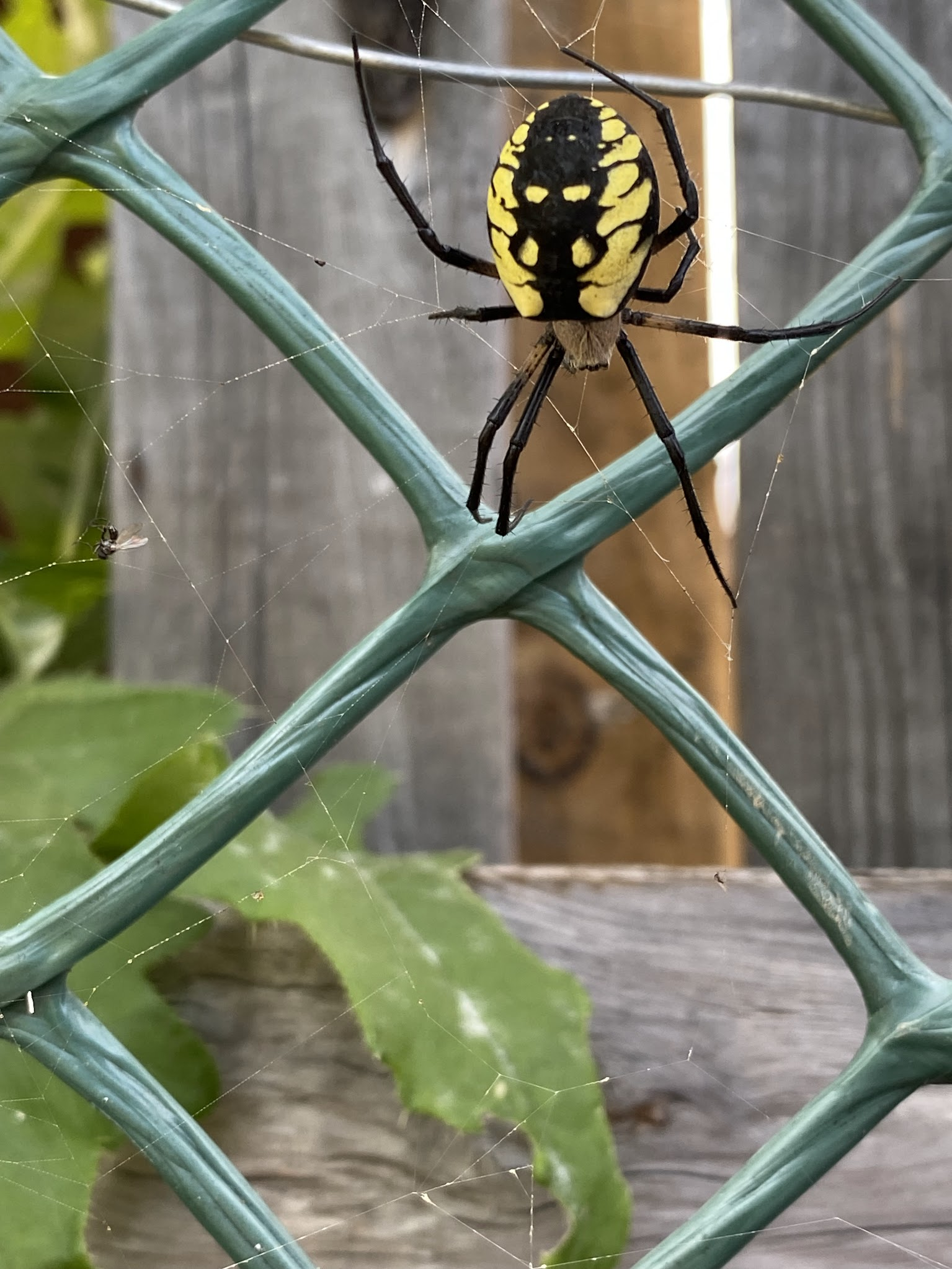
Yellow Garden Spider in Toronto, Canada

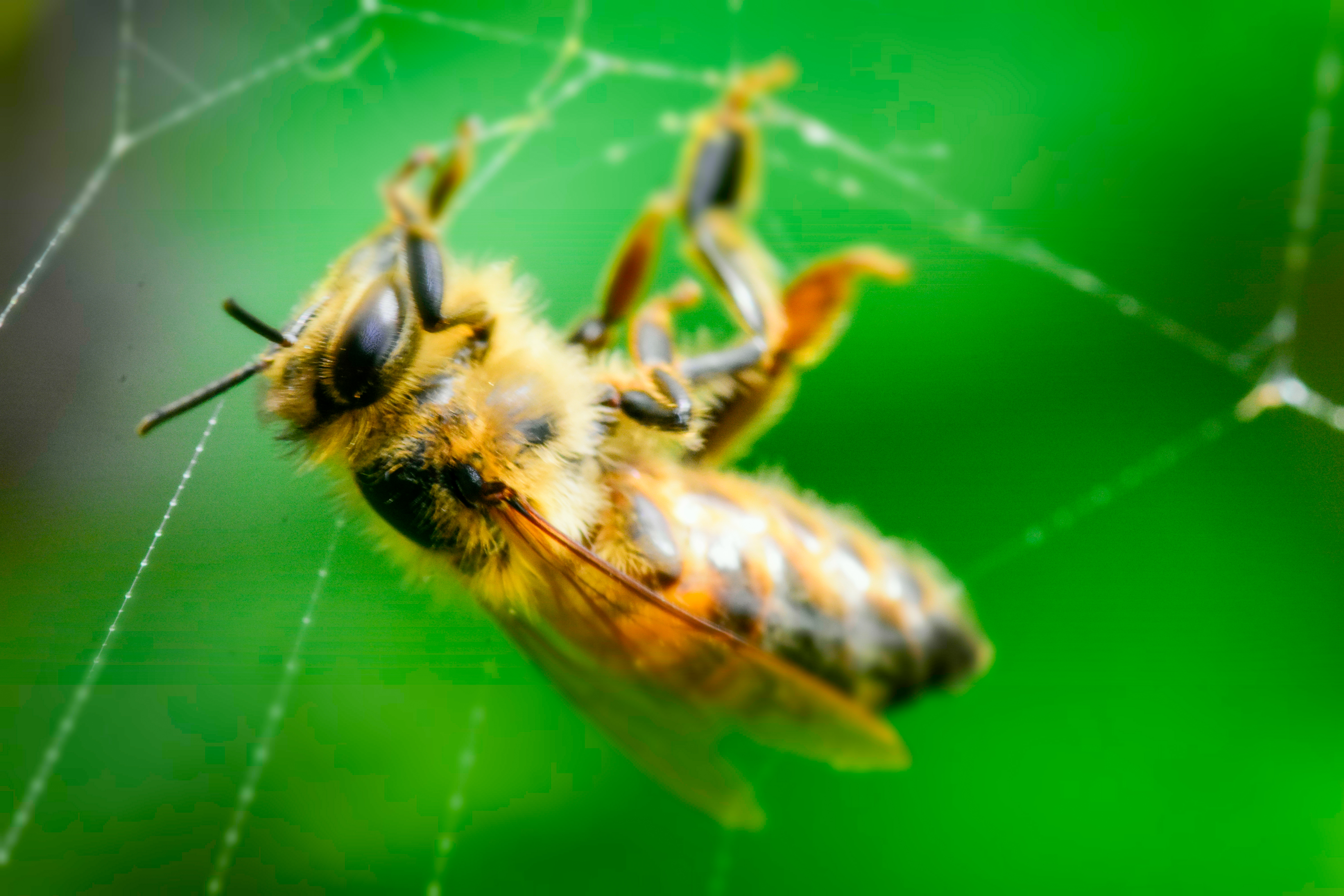
Western honey bee trapped in web, before escaping

Capturing and wrapping several honey bees

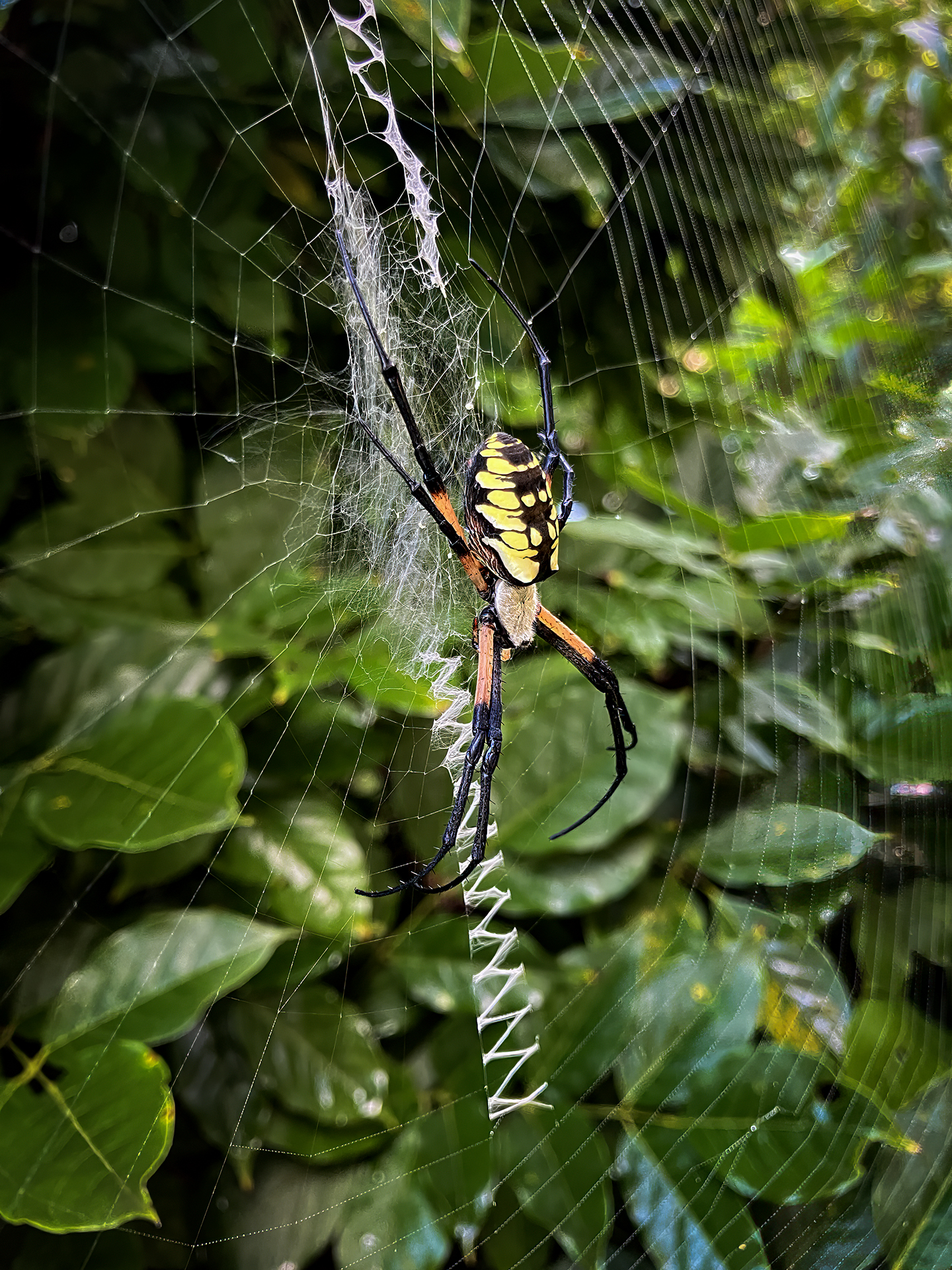
