= Writing spider =

Writing spider may refer to:

- Argiope aurantia, also known as the "black and yellow garden spider" or "corn spider"
  - Other species of Argiope (spider)
- Members of the genus Nephila, known as golden silk orb-weavers, sometimes misidentified as writing spiders
