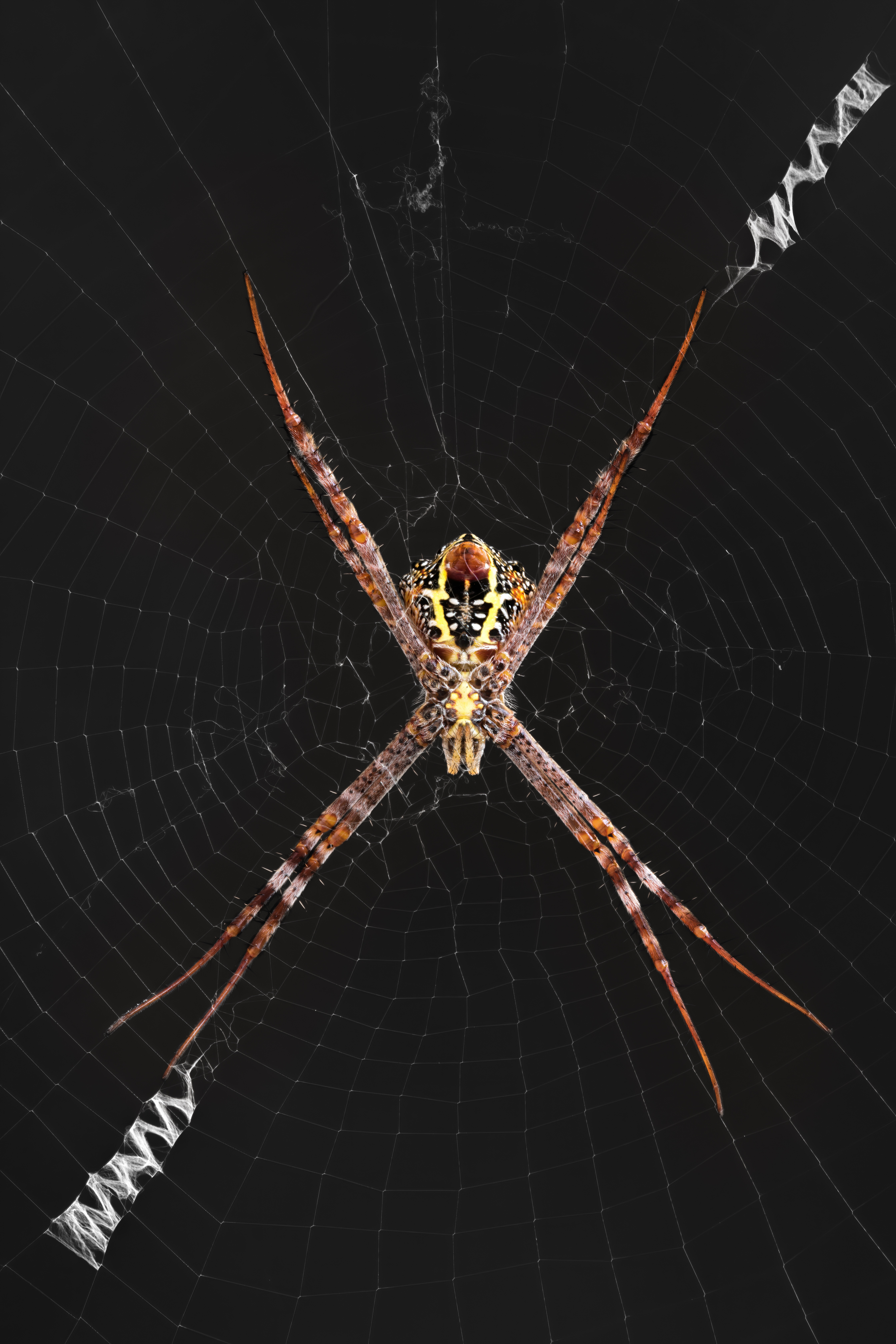
- Female in Don Det, Si Phan Don, Laos

Scientific classification
- Domain: Eukaryota
- Kingdom: Animalia
- Phylum: Arthropoda
- Subphylum: Chelicerata
- Class: Arachnida
- Order: Araneae
- Infraorder: Araneomorphae
- Family: Araneidae
- Genus: Argiope
- Species: A. versicolor

Binomial name
- Argiope versicolor (Doleschall, 1859)

Synonyms
- Epeira versicolor Doleschall, 1859

= Argiope versicolor =

Species of spider

Argiope versicolor, the multi-coloured Saint Andrew's cross spider, is a species of orb-weaver spider found mostly in Southeast Asia, from China to Indonesia.

== Description ==
Argiope versicolor is a colorful spider. The female's cephalothorax is covered by silvery hair. Its abdomen is pentagonal in shape with white, yellow, red, dark bands dorsally, and two longitudinal yellow stripes ventrally. The dark bands are dotted with white. The legs are orange with dark bands. She usually sits head down in the centre of the web, with legs held spread-eagle in an 'X' shape.

The male is smaller and duller than the female, and brown and cream coloured.

== Biology ==
Like other members of the genus, females sometimes decorate their web with a zig-zag stabilimentum of white silk, which varies in shape from discoid in juveniles to cruciform in mature females. The stabilimentum may be association with predator-avoidance behaviours.

Male webs are not decorated by zig-zag white bands.

== Gallery ==
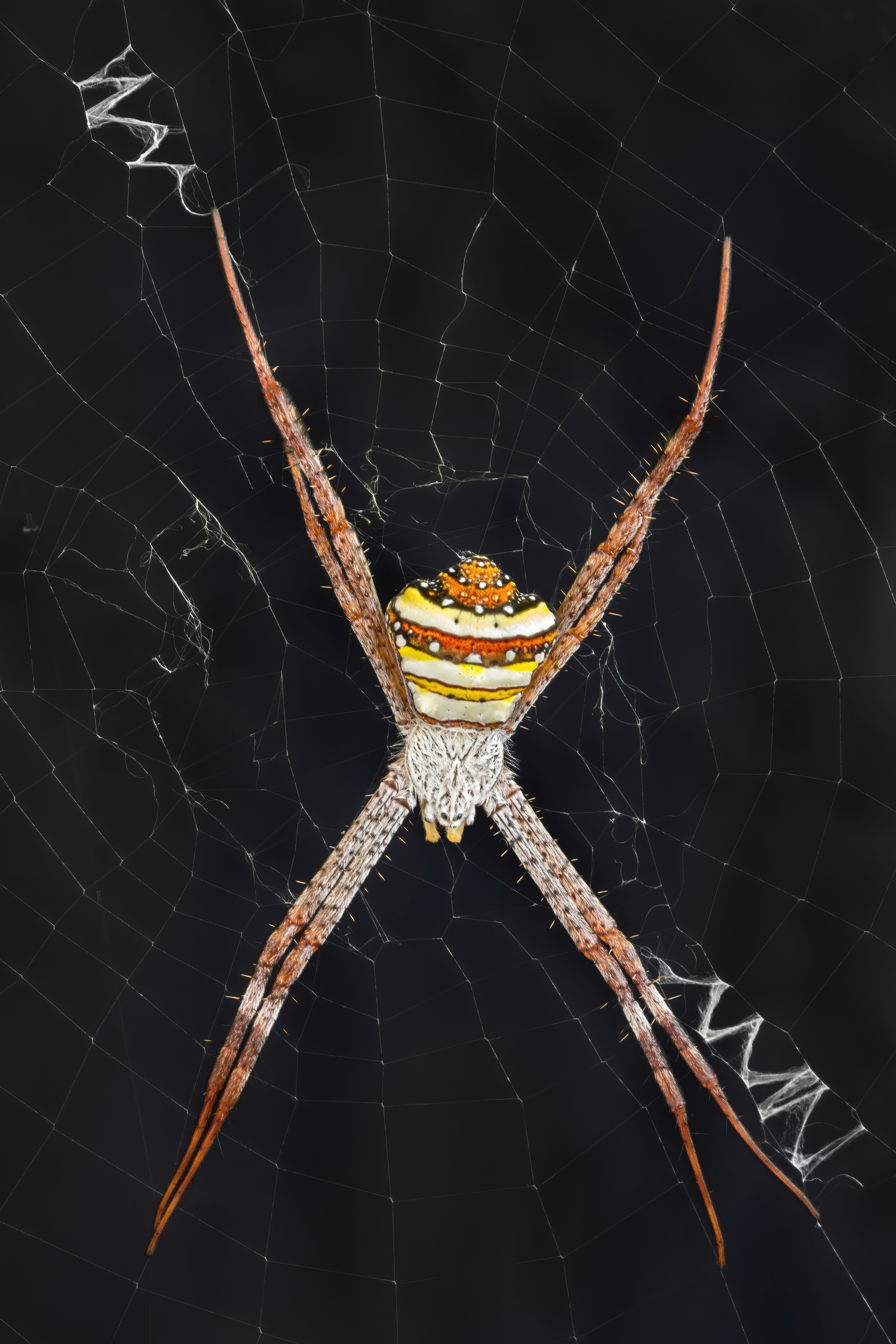
Female adult on her web, dorsal view, Laos. Visible stabilimentum (web decoration).

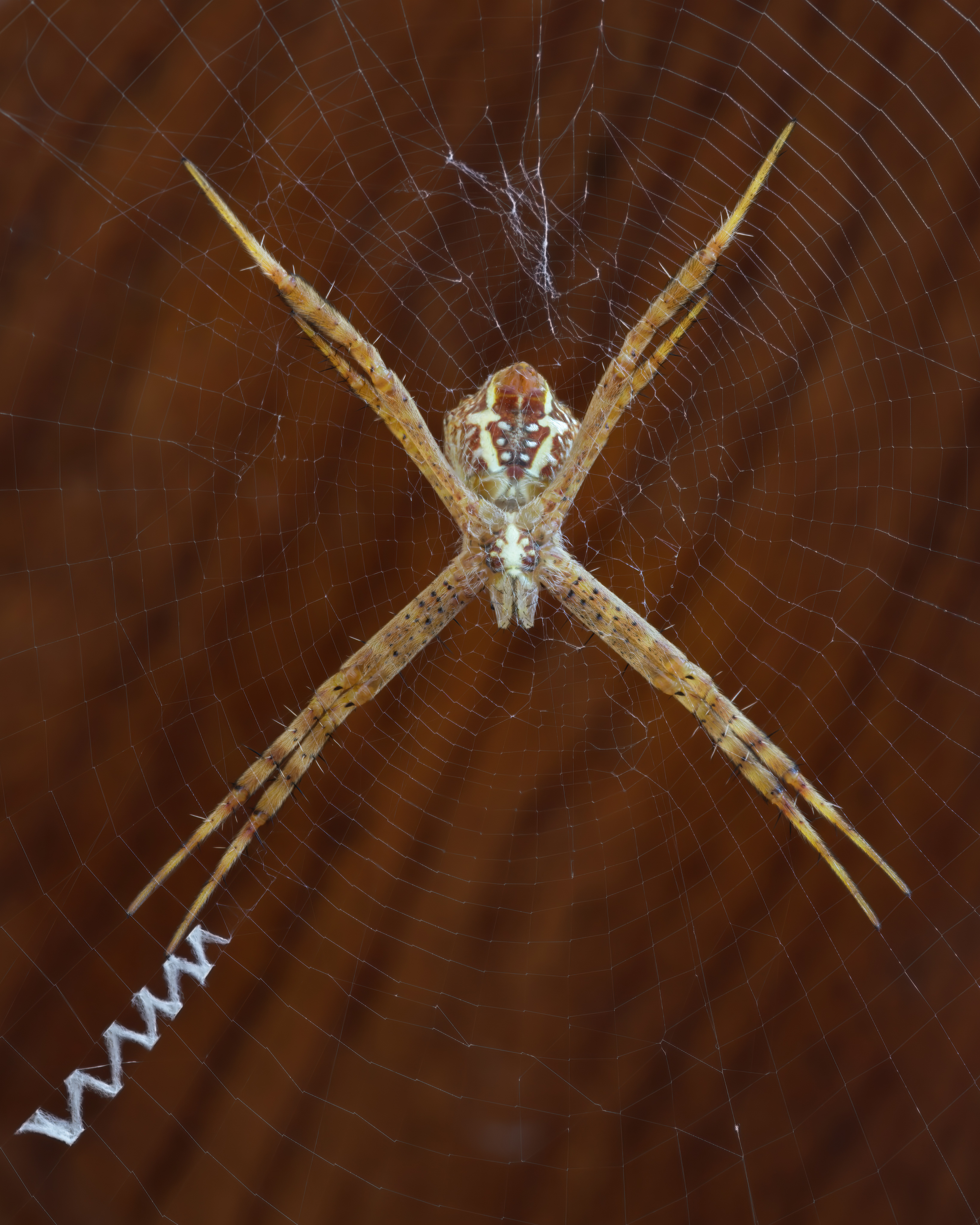
Female juvenile on her web, ventral view, Laos. Visible stabilimentum (web decoration).

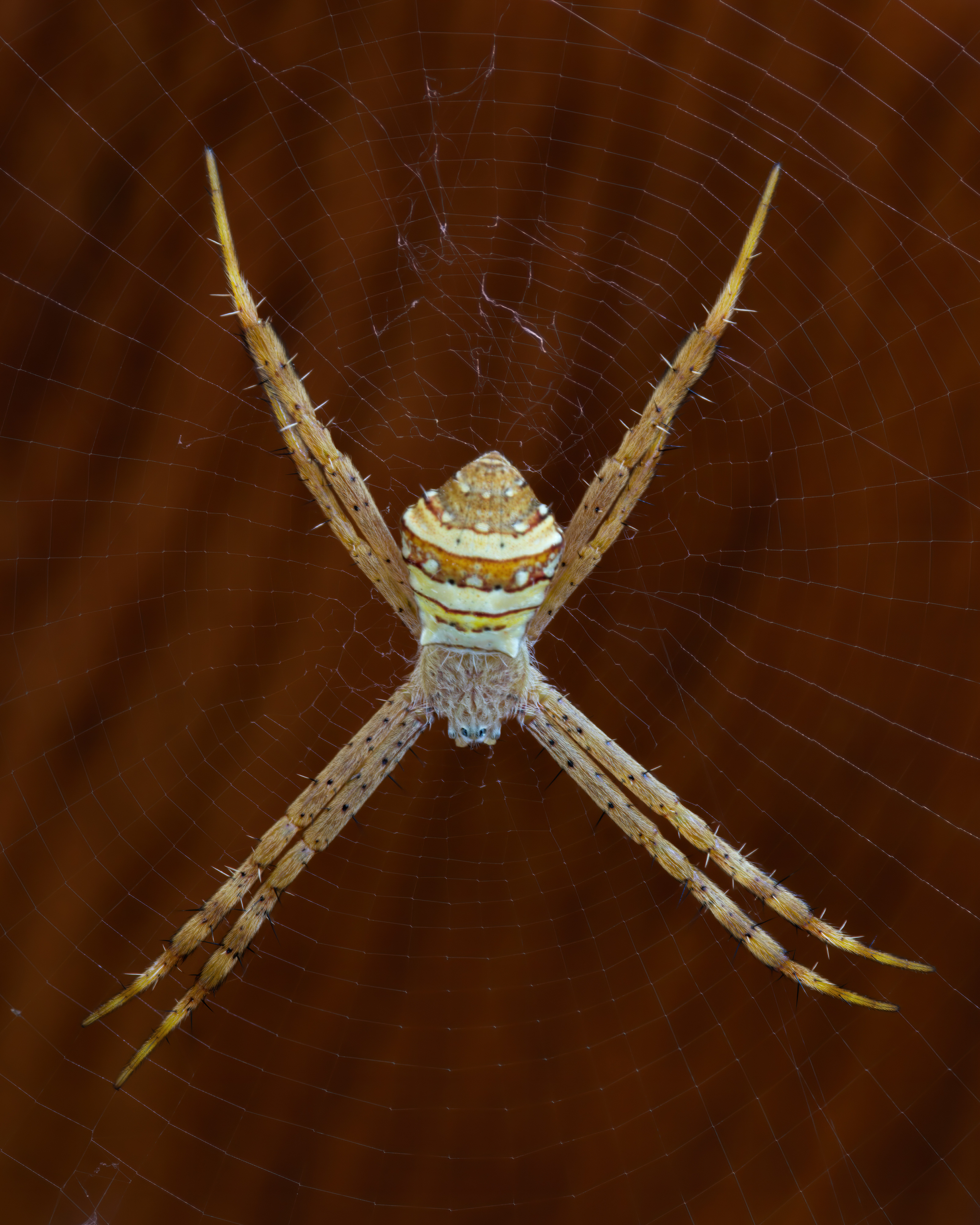
Female juvenile on her web, dorsal view, Laos.

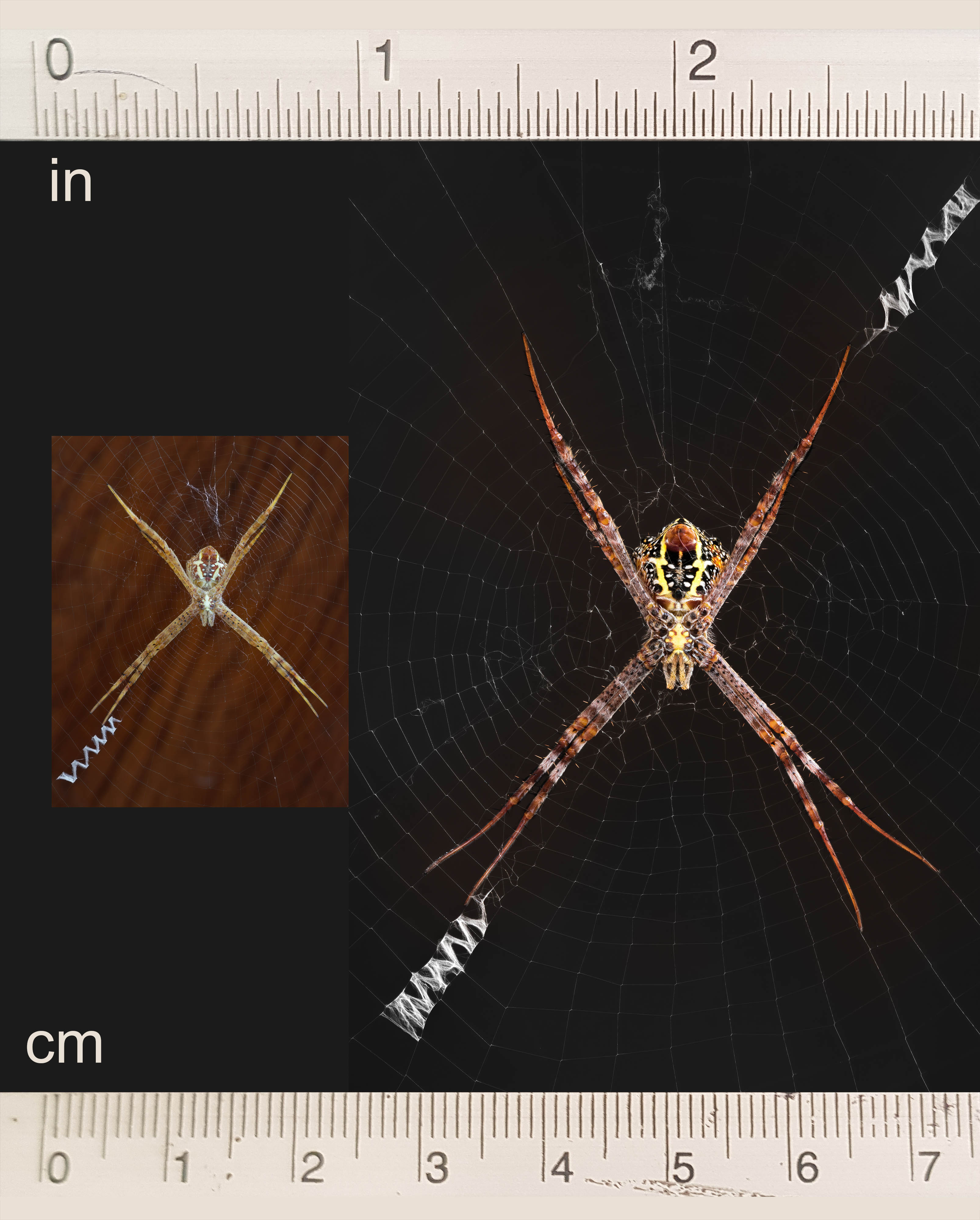
Female adult and juvenile, size comparison, Laos.
