= Argiotoxin =

Toxins isolated from orb-weaver spiders

Argiotoxins represent a class of polyamine toxins isolated from orb-weaver spiders (Araneus gemma and Argiope lobata). These spiders belong to the Araneidae spider family, which are found worldwide.

Chemical structure of argiopine (argiotoxin 636)

== Classification ==
Argiotoxin can be classified, according to the 1980s classification of spider venoms, as a toxin of the acylpolyamines family, which contains more than 100 different chemical structures of closely related toxins. Acylpolyamines are neurotoxic compounds that are found only in the venom glands of spiders at a picomolar level.

Argiotoxins are classified into three different categories according to its chromophore's nature: the argiopine type, the argiopinine type and the pseudoargiopinine type.

- Argiopine: contains 2,4-dihydroxyphenylacetic acid. It is also named Arg-636.
- Argiopinines: (4-hydroxyindol-3-yl) acetic acid is carried as the chromophore. These molecules are: Arg-630, Arg-658, Arg-659, Arg-744, Arg-759.
- Pseudoargiopinines: They contain a (indol-3-yl) acetic acid. This group is composed of: Arg-373, Arg-728, Arg-743.

== Biochemical structure ==
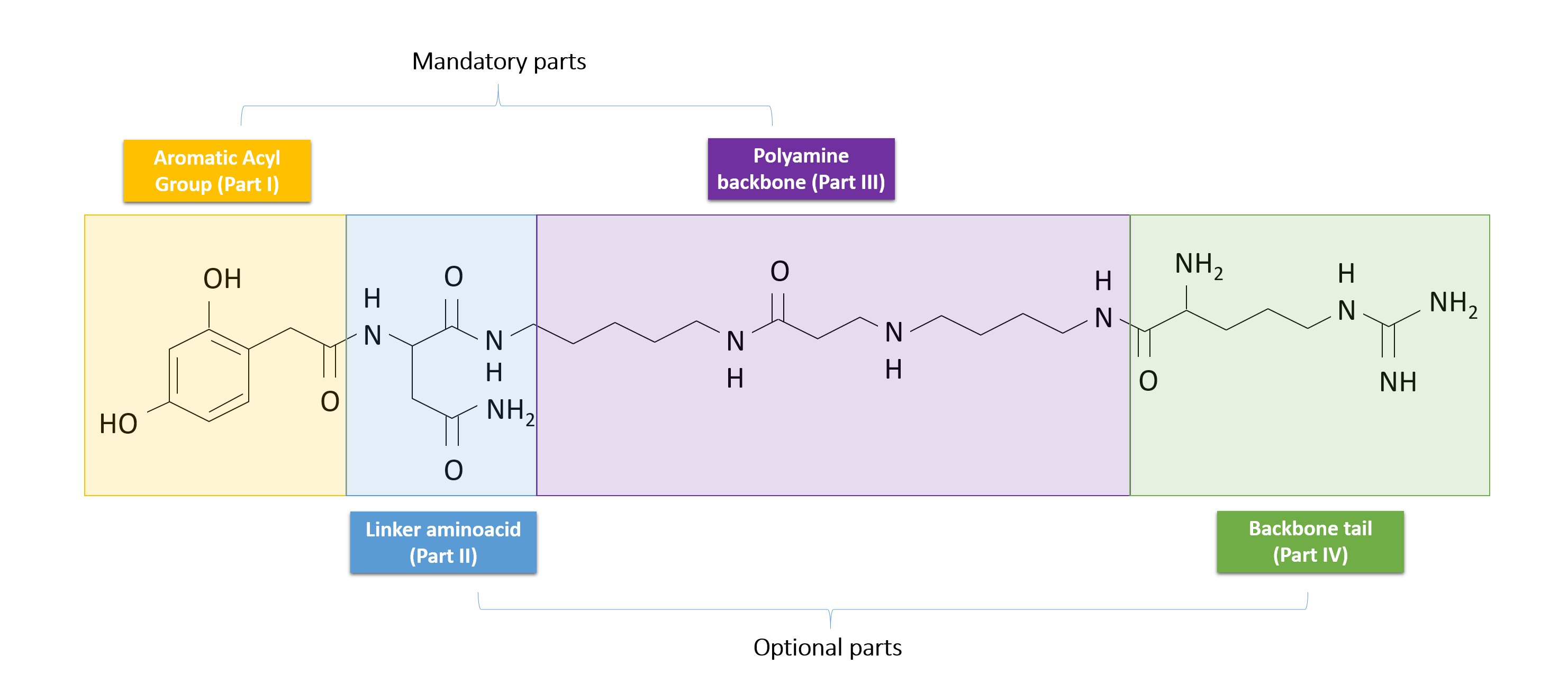
Structural parts of the acylpolyamine toxins from spider venoms

It is a low-molecular-weight neurotoxin which has highly functional polar groups: free phenolic OH and amine and guanidine residues.

It also possesses arginine (free NH_{2}) connected to a -NH (CH)3 NH (C ~) 3NH (CH) 5-NH- one through a peptide bond polyamine. The polyamine is connected to the asparagine's α-carboxyl group. The amino group of this aminoacid is linked to 2,4-dihydroxyphenyl acetic acid.

Its structure was established using spectroscopy 1H, ^{13}C-RMN, mass spectrometry, and elemental aminoacid analysis.

A complete synthesis strategy of argiotoxin and derivatives was developed in order to make biological tests in different living beings.

A noted type of argiotoxin, the Arg-636, which molecular formula is C29H52N10O6 [3], has a molecular weight of 636.78658 g/mol. It has a formal charge of 0. Its IUPAC name is: (2S) - N- { 5 - [ 3 - ( 3 - [ [ (2S)-2-amino-5-(diaminomethylideneamino) pentanoyl ] amino ] propylamino ) propylamino ] pentyl } -2- { [ 2 - (2,4-dihydroxyphenyl) acetyl ] amino } butanediamide

== Effects and properties ==
The effects of argiotoxin, when it enters an organism by a spider bite, are harmless to humans, although in certain cases the bite of argiotoxin spiders can produce mild swelling and itching. Argiotoxin antagonizes the actions of the neurotransmitter glutamate, blocks the functioning of ion channel and affects the synaptic transmission of preys. These toxins, like all the other low-molecular-weight toxins, have a huge potential to be used in neurochemical studies to develop novel drugs of neurotherapeutic applications.

== Mechanism of action of argiotoxins ==
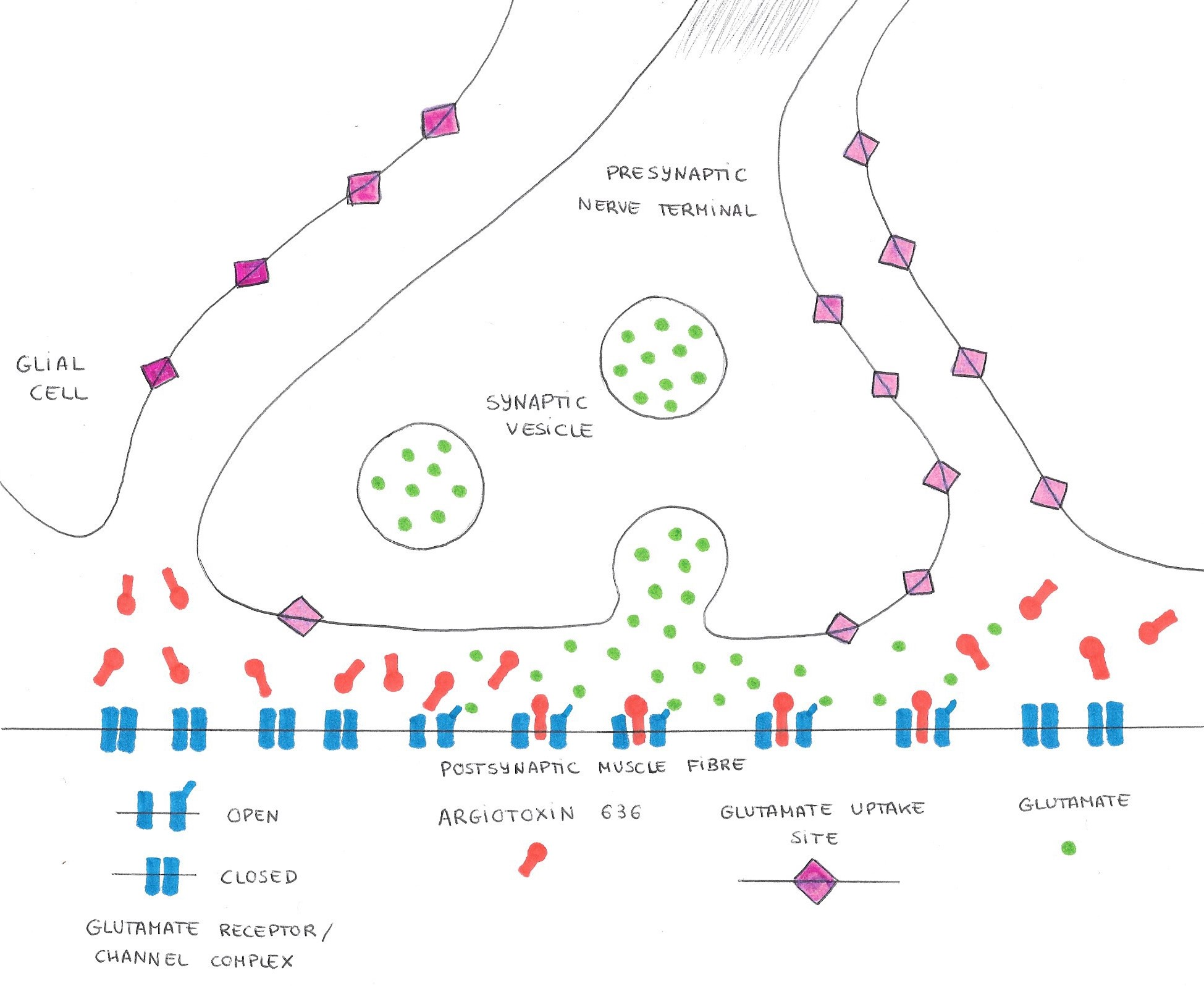
Behaviour of argiotoxins at the junction of nerve and muscle

This spider's venom shows varied action mechanisms that affect the different parts of the nervous impulse transmission chain. As mentioned above, Argiotoxins are polyamine toxins. This biomolecular group can effectively inhibit certain ligand-gated ion channels in the central nervous system of mammals and the insects' glutamic receptor (it has been characterized as an opposite of homomeric and heteromeric glutamate-activated receptor channels). It has been seen that it can also inhibit the following receptors: AMPA, NMDA (argiotoxin has higher potency at NMDA receptors), kainate, and nicotine acetylcholine receptors. It is thought that polyamine toxins' inhibition is both use and voltage dependent. What is more, they bind within the pore of the open channels they inhibit.

A lot of attention is drawn to the pharmacological uses of polyamine toxins. They are highly valuable due to their high affinity for ionotropic glutamate receptors, important drug targets for psychiatric disorders. It has not been developed yet, although it is thought that it could be a great procedure in neuroprotection and in the treatment of Alzheimer's disease.

Argiotoxin could even be used as a tool for analyzing the subunit composition of AMPA receptors in native membranes.

=== Argiotoxin-636 ===
The most relevant example for the strategies mentioned above is the Argiotoxin-636. This is a polyamine toxin isolated from the Argiope lobata's venom. However, there are still some difficulties, as ArgTX-636 cannot distinguish the different subtypes of ionotropic glutamate receptors.

This same toxin is demonstrated to be a good regulator for melanogenesis without cytotoxicity. This is a potential reason why ArgTX-636 is playing a leading role in the research of cosmetic products against hyper pigmentation.

ArgTX-636 can also work as an analgesic due to some peripheral actions. Thanks to its action as inhibitor on gtutamate-activated channels it could work as an anti convulsant.

== Experiments with argiotoxins ==
Argiotoxins studies have been particularly made to discover the relation between inhibition, receptors, and ionic channels. Researchers have specifically pursued the blocking of receptors on invertebrates, rather than on vertebrates.

Referring to invertebrates, Planorbarius corneus is a mollusc involved in one of the many ionic experiments. To begin with, neurons of molluscan pedal ganglia were isolated and transferred to a special chamber with saline solution and regulated temperature. Then, the observation was based on routine voltage clamp technique. Electrical measurements were obtained from the evaluation of neurons response to various substances (argiopines).

In addition to that, crayfish, a freshwater crustacean, has followed a similar protocol to this study. In this case, the analysis was made of the stomach muscles and using the patch clamp technique. The research findings were obtained taking into account the bursts of openings of excitatory channels.

Other experiments use spectroscopy in order to analyse and differentiate these molecules. HPLC, mass spectrometry, UV data and amino acid analysis are the elements that allow identifying diverse argiotoxins due to their spectrum. Argiope lobata toxins (Arg 636, Arg 630, Arg 658, Arg 744, Arg 759, Arg 373, Arg 728, Arg 723, ...) show a close similarity in their structures; the subtle differences between them are chemical points, such as N-methyl groups, molecular masses or lysine residues that are determined in a certain position in their structure.

== See also ==
- Argiope lobata
- Araneus gemma
- Delucemine
- Neurotoxin
