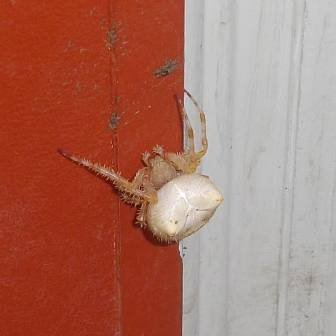

Scientific classification
- Domain: Eukaryota
- Kingdom: Animalia
- Phylum: Arthropoda
- Subphylum: Chelicerata
- Class: Arachnida
- Order: Araneae
- Infraorder: Araneomorphae
- Family: Araneidae
- Genus: Araneus
- Species: A. gemma

Binomial name
- Araneus gemma McCook, 1888

Synonyms
- Epeira gemma Araneus pirus Araneus gemmus

= Araneus gemma =

Species of spider

Araneus gemma, commonly known as the cat-faced spider (a name shared with Araneus gemmoides) or jeweled orbweaver spider, is a common outdoor orb-weaver spider found in the western United States and Canada.

Like most Araneus species, A. gemma is harmless to humans. It contains a venomous toxin of low molecular weight called argiotoxin, that antagonizes the actions of the neurotransmitter glutamate. Dopamine was also identified in the venom of A. gemma in a concentration of 4.3 nM.

The web silk of the A. gemma ranges from 1 to 4 μm in diameter.
