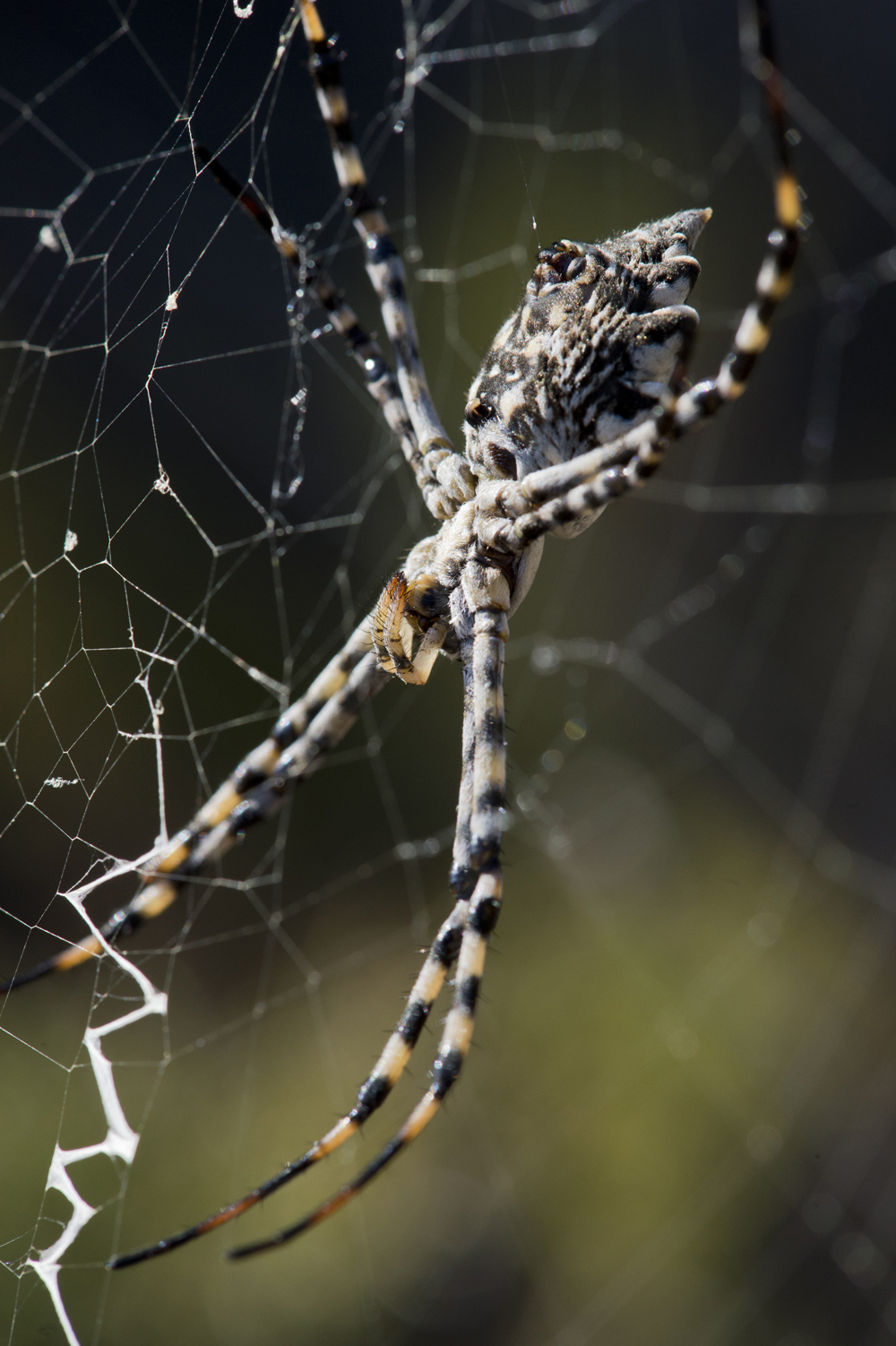
- A. lobata from Spain

Conservation status
- Least Concern (SANBI Red List)

Scientific classification
- Kingdom: Animalia
- Phylum: Arthropoda
- Subphylum: Chelicerata
- Class: Arachnida
- Order: Araneae
- Infraorder: Araneomorphae
- Family: Araneidae
- Genus: Argiope
- Species: A. lobata

Binomial name
- Argiope lobata (Pallas, 1772)

Synonyms
- Aranea lobata Pallas, 1772; Aranea argentea Gmelin, 1789; Aranea sericea Olivier, 1789; Argyope sericea Audouin, 1826; Argyope splendida Audouin, 1826; Argyopes praelautus C. L. Koch, 1838; Argyopes impudicus L. Koch, 1867; Argiope arcuata Simon, 1884; Argiope lobata retracta Franganillo, 1918

= Argiope lobata =

Black-Lobed Garden Orb-Web Spider

Species of spider

Argiope lobata is a species of spider in the family Araneidae. It has a very wide global distribution and is commonly known as the black-lobed garden orb-web spider.

== Distribution ==
Argiope lobata occurs from the Mediterranean region to China, from Myanmar to New Caledonia and northern Australia. In Africa, the species is known from Morocco and Algeria to Senegal. In South Africa, the species is known from eight provinces at elevations ranging from 63 to 1,780 m above sea level.

== Habitat and ecology ==
The species constructs orb webs in open grassland areas and gardens. The webs are usually placed low in shrubby vegetation sturdy enough to bear their weight. The spider hangs in the hub head-down throughout the day. The species inhabits Grassland, Succulent Karoo and Savanna biomes.

== Description ==
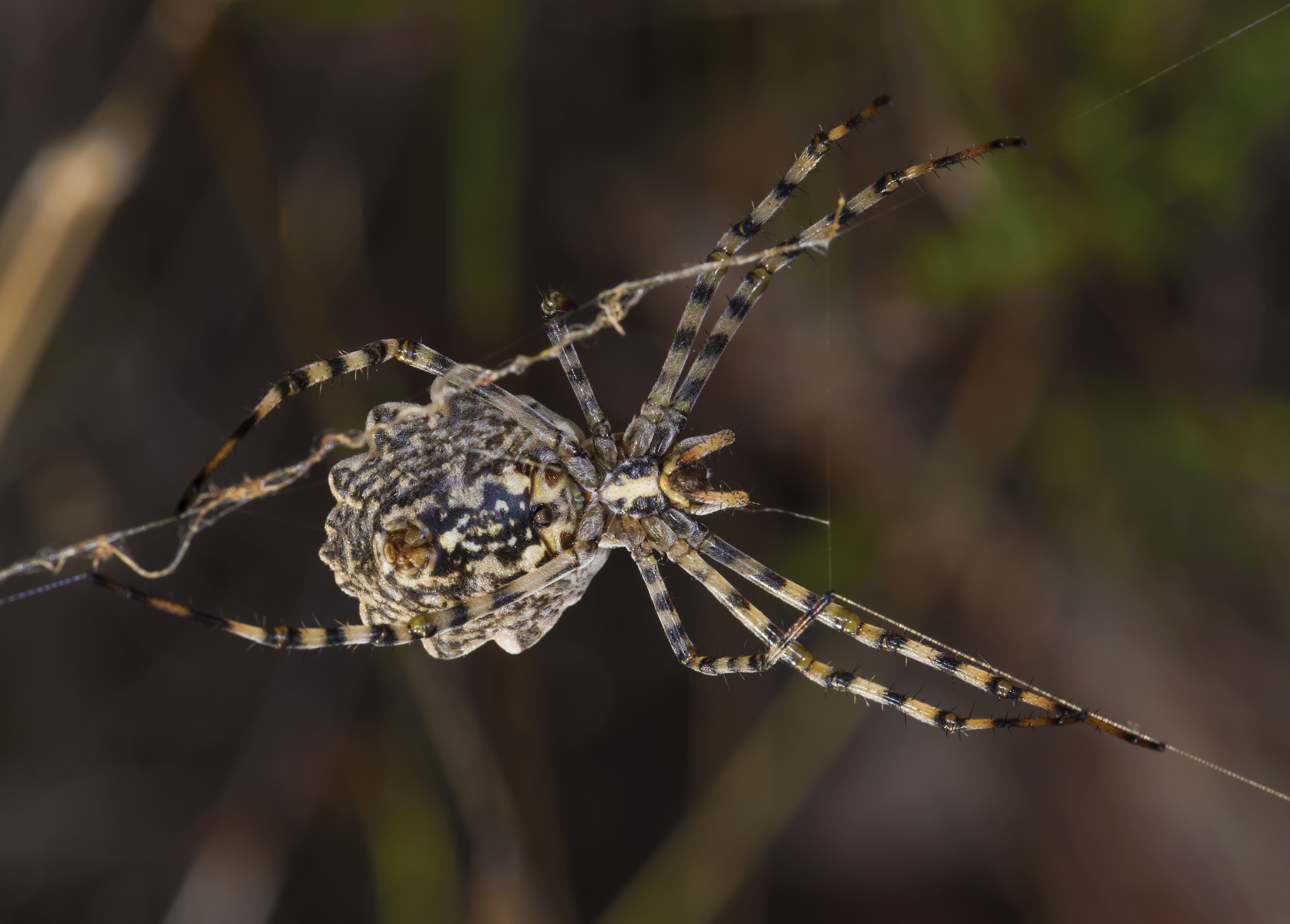
Ventral side of a female

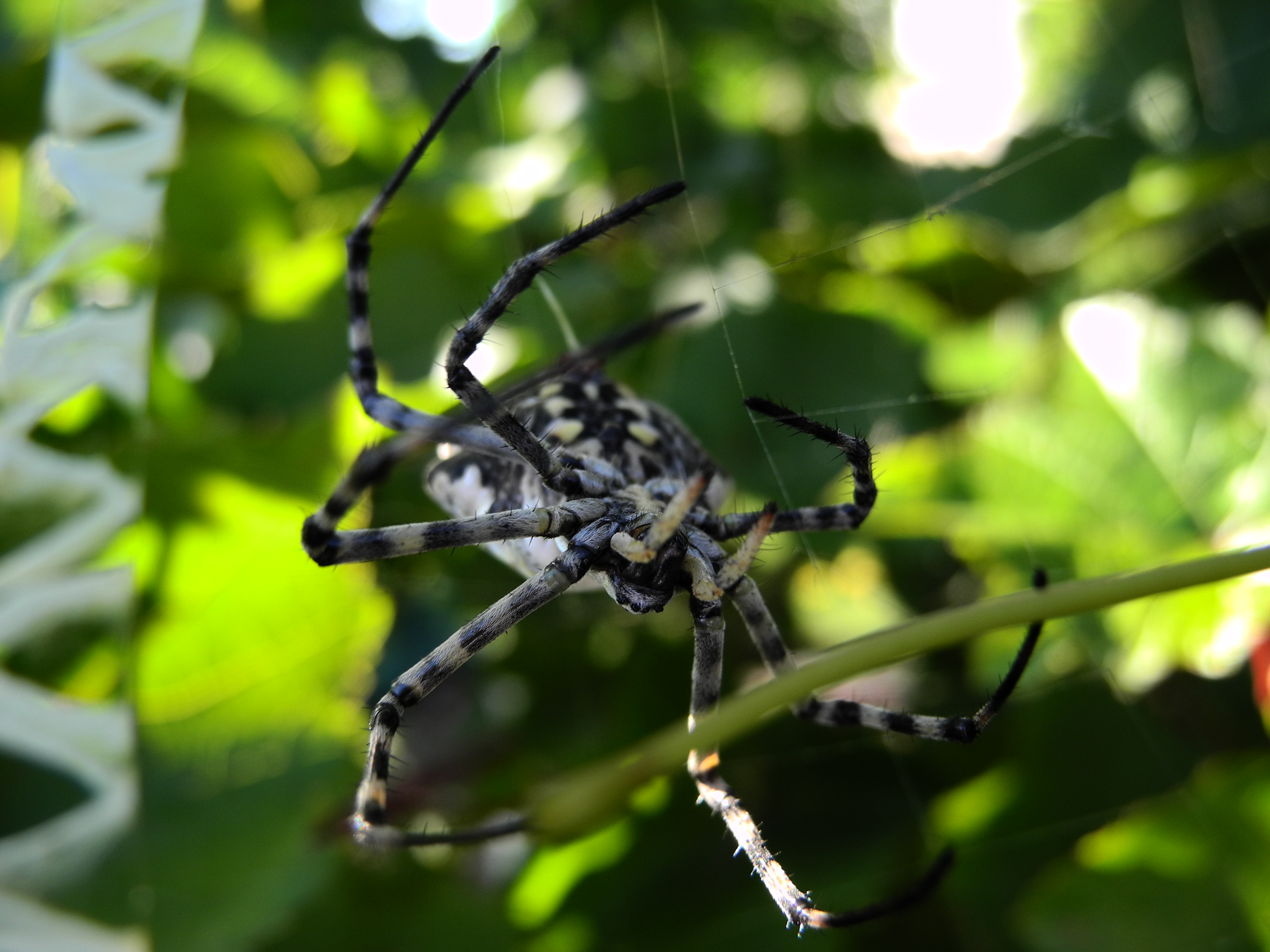
Argiope lobata

Typical for Argiope species, the male of this species is small (body length 6 mm) but the female is large and spectacular at up to 25 mm in length. The silver abdomen is marked with black and red spots and carries deep furrows and distinctive lobes around the edge. As with other spiders in this genus, the large web is usually decorated with prominent zig-zag stabilimenta.

== Conservation ==
Argiope lobata is listed as Least Concern by the South African National Biodiversity Institute due to its wide geographic distribution. The species is protected in seven protected areas including Lekgalameetse Nature Reserve and Lhuvhondo Nature Reserve.

== Taxonomy ==
The species was originally described by Pallas in 1772 as Aranea lobata. It was revised by Bjørn in 1997, who synonymized Argiope arcuata and A. lobata retracta with this species.
