= Stabilimentum =

Conspicuous, usually zig-zagged, silk structure in some orb-weaver spider webs

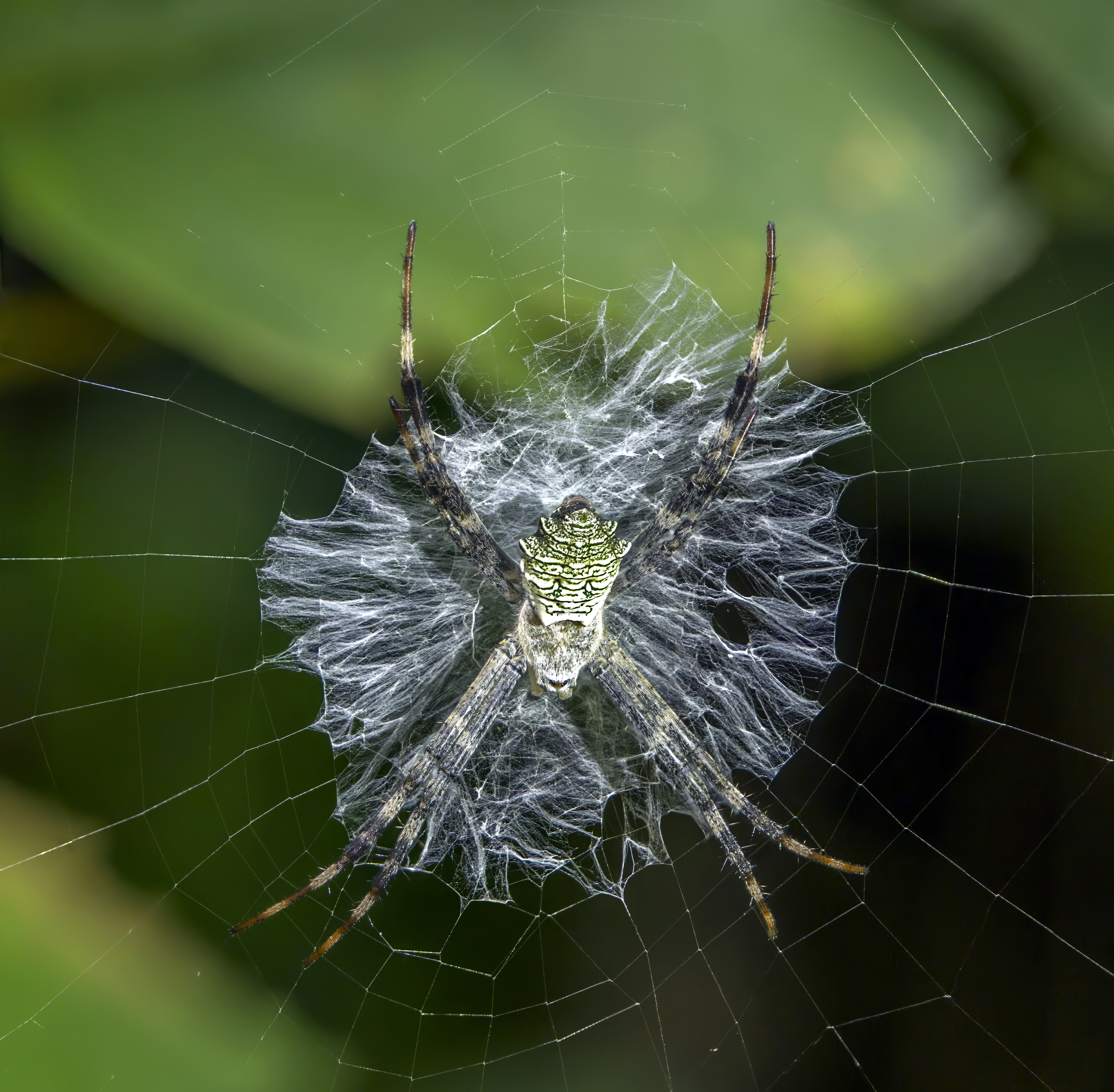
Argiope flavipalpis adult female

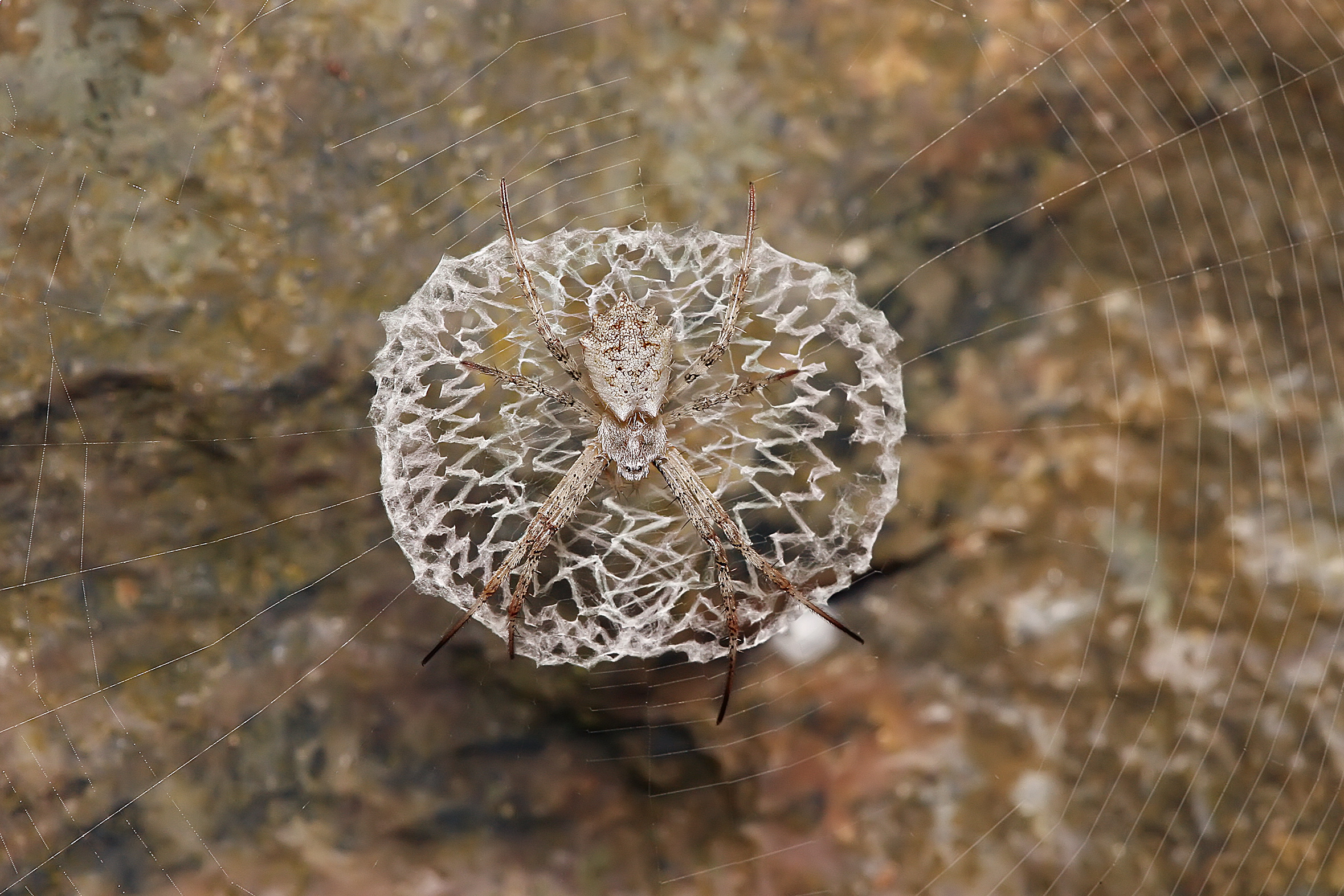
An Argiope juvenile female on the stabilimentum at the center of the web.

A stabilimentum (plural: stabilimenta), also known as a web decoration, is a conspicuous silk structure included in the webs of some species of orb-web spider. Its function is a subject of debate.

== Origin ==
Likely, the use of stabilimenta evolved independently at least nine different times. Araneus and Gasteracantha make silk stabilimenta, while Cyclosa and the closely related Allocyclosa bifurca make stabilimenta of silk, detritus, and their egg sacs. All those evolved independently from those of Argiope, although some decorations of Allocyclosa bifurca closely resemble those of Argiope.

== Form ==
Although web decorations are common in several spider species in the families Araneidae, Tetragnathidae, and Uloboridae, they are probably best known from spiders of the genus Argiope. This genus includes several species known as the Saint Andrew's Cross spiders, so named for their habit of resting in their webs with their legs outstretched in the shape of an X, the traditional shape of the cross of Saint Andrew. Argiope argentata, more commonly known as silver argiopes, are also known for spinning stabilimenta into their web. These stabilimenta can appear as zig-zag lines, and most commonly come in bouts of four creating a center-less X. Spiders in this genus also construct web decorations as vertical lines, and juveniles commonly construct disc-shaped decorations. Other spiders construct round structures covering the entire hub of the web. Some Cyclosa spiders and Azilia vachoni construct conspicuous stabilimenta with attached detritus such as egg sacs and insect carcasses (mostly their prey), and also hang debris such as dried leaves from their webs. A specialized and highly complex form of detritus stabilimentum is constructed by at least two tropical Cyclosa species in Peru and the Philippines. These spiders meticulously arrange detritus and silk into a central mass with radiating appendages that visually resemble the silhouette of a much larger orb-weaving spider.

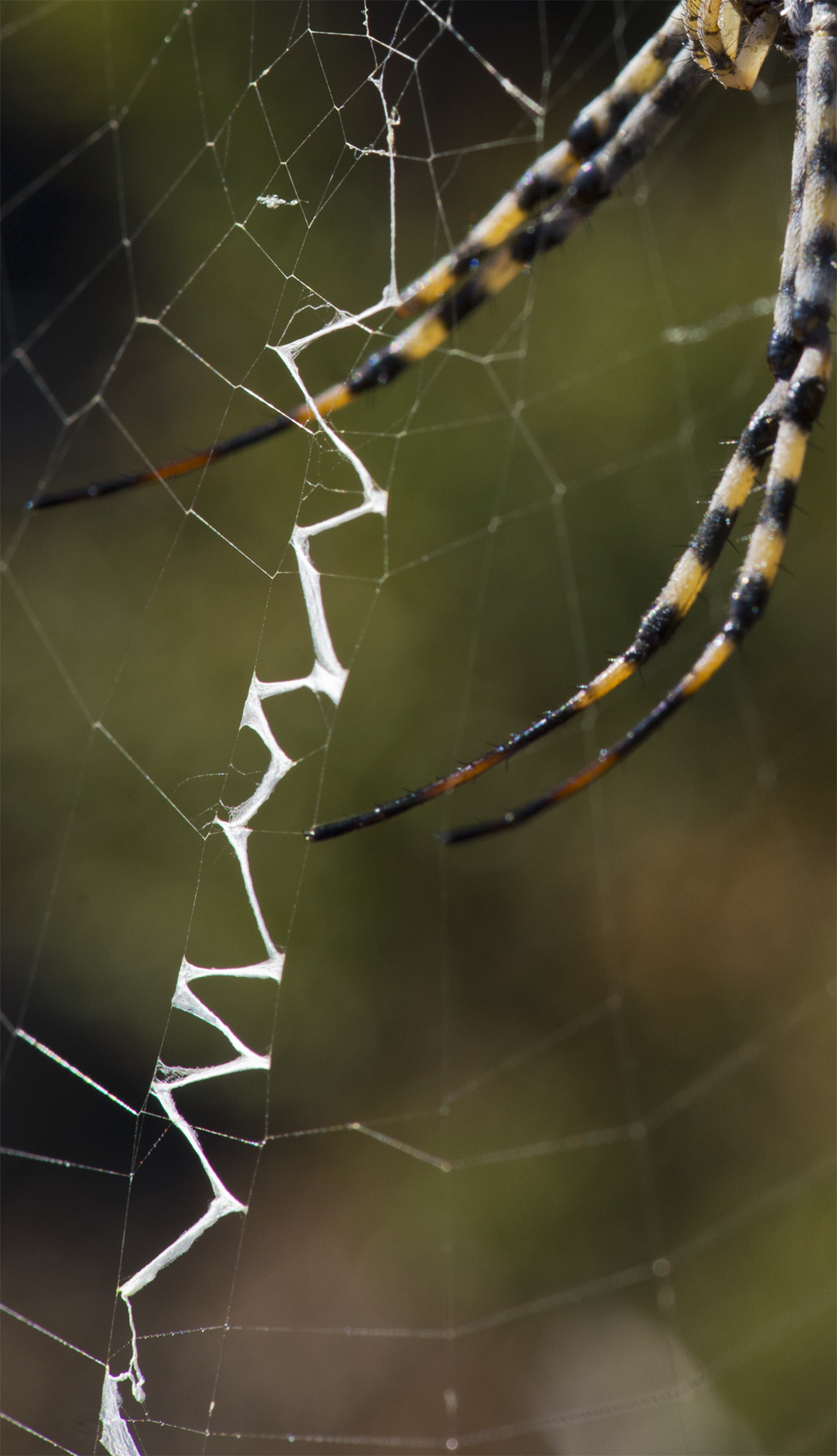
The detail of the stabilimentum in the web of a female Argiope lobata showing its zig-zag structure and rostral location

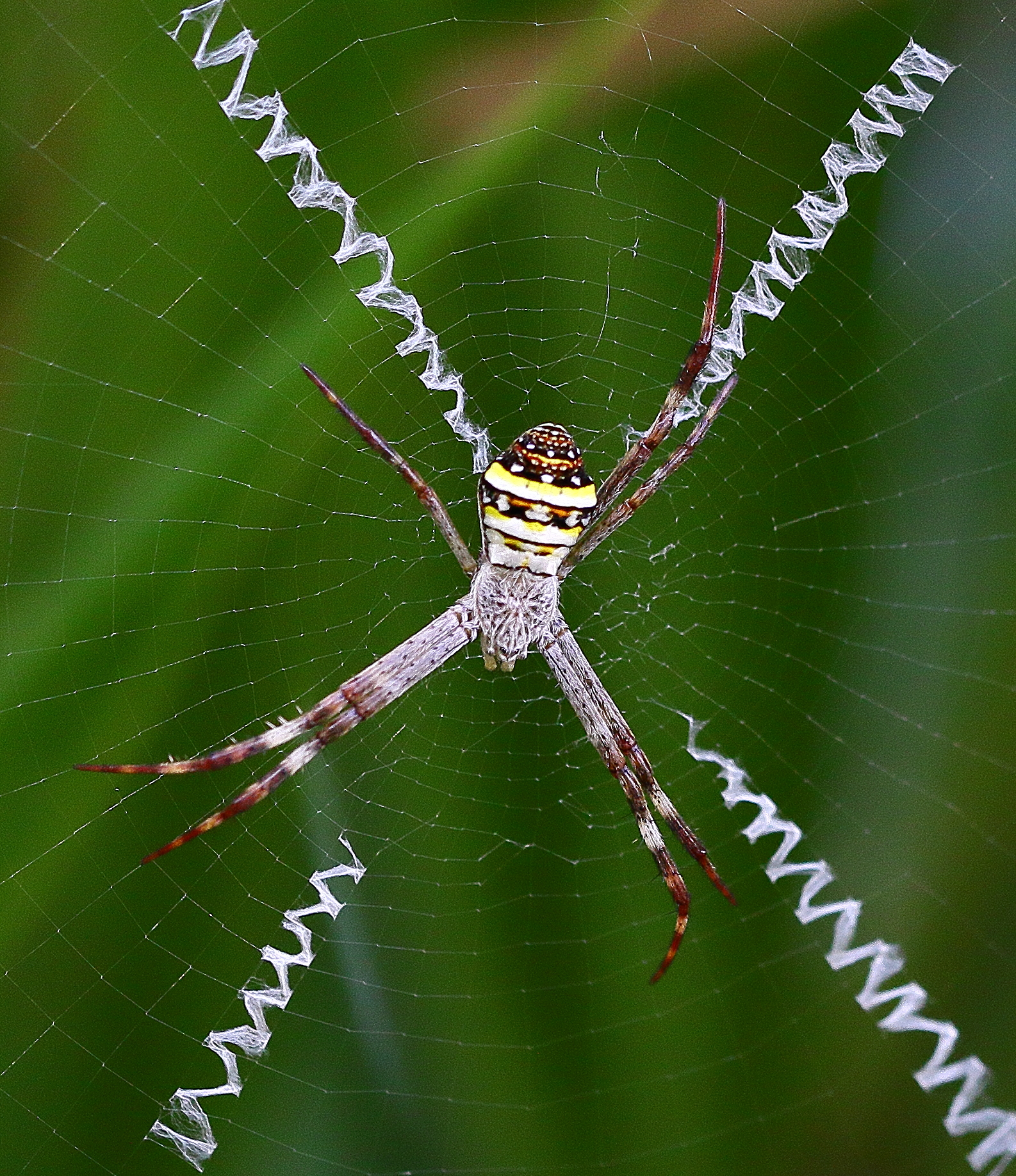
Argiope aetherea from Australia build X-shaped decorations

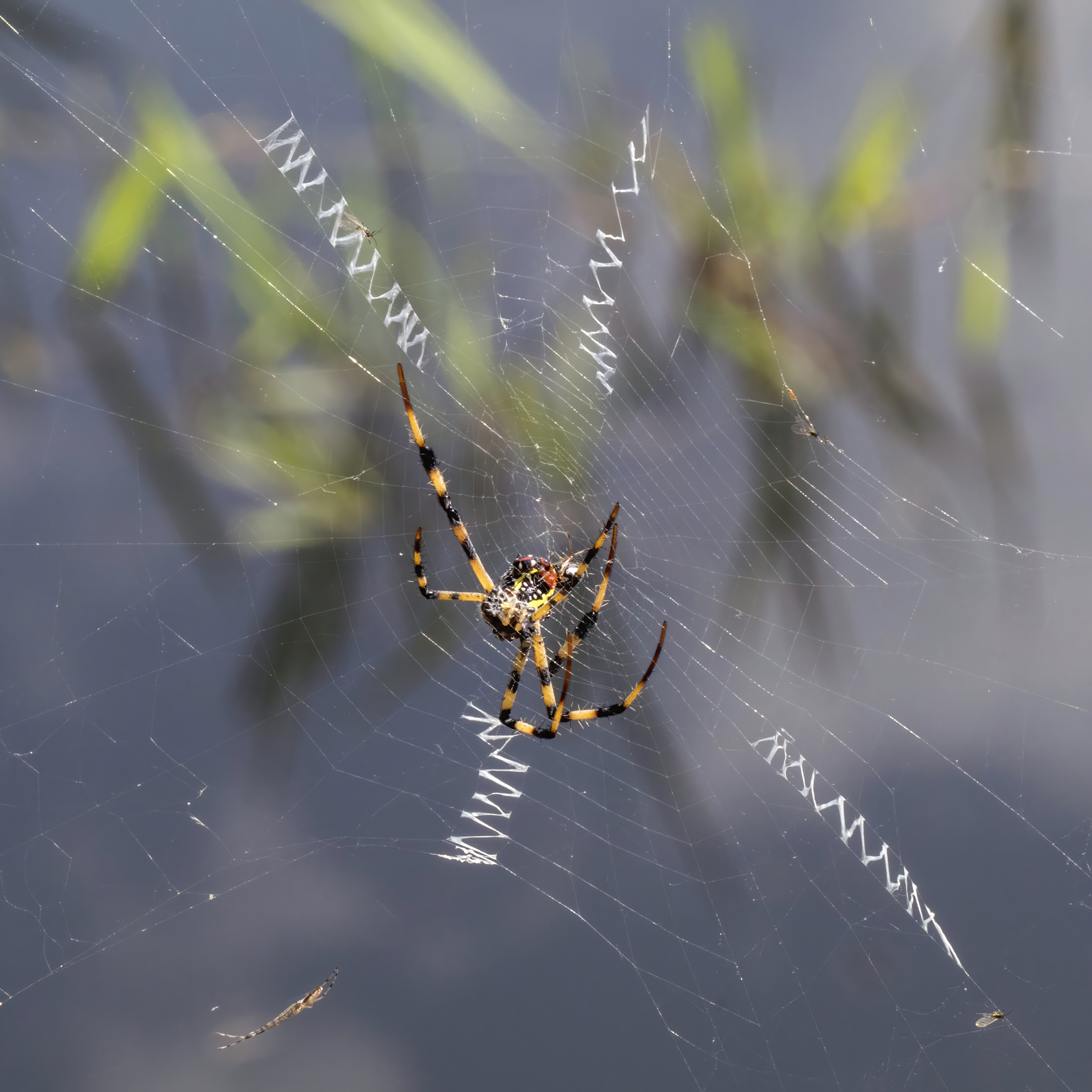
Argiope sp.

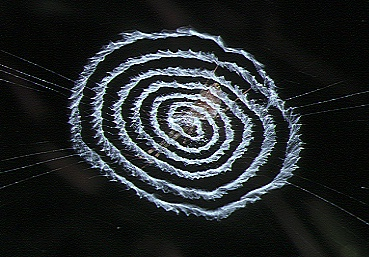
An Octonoba yaeyamensis with a spiral stabilimentum

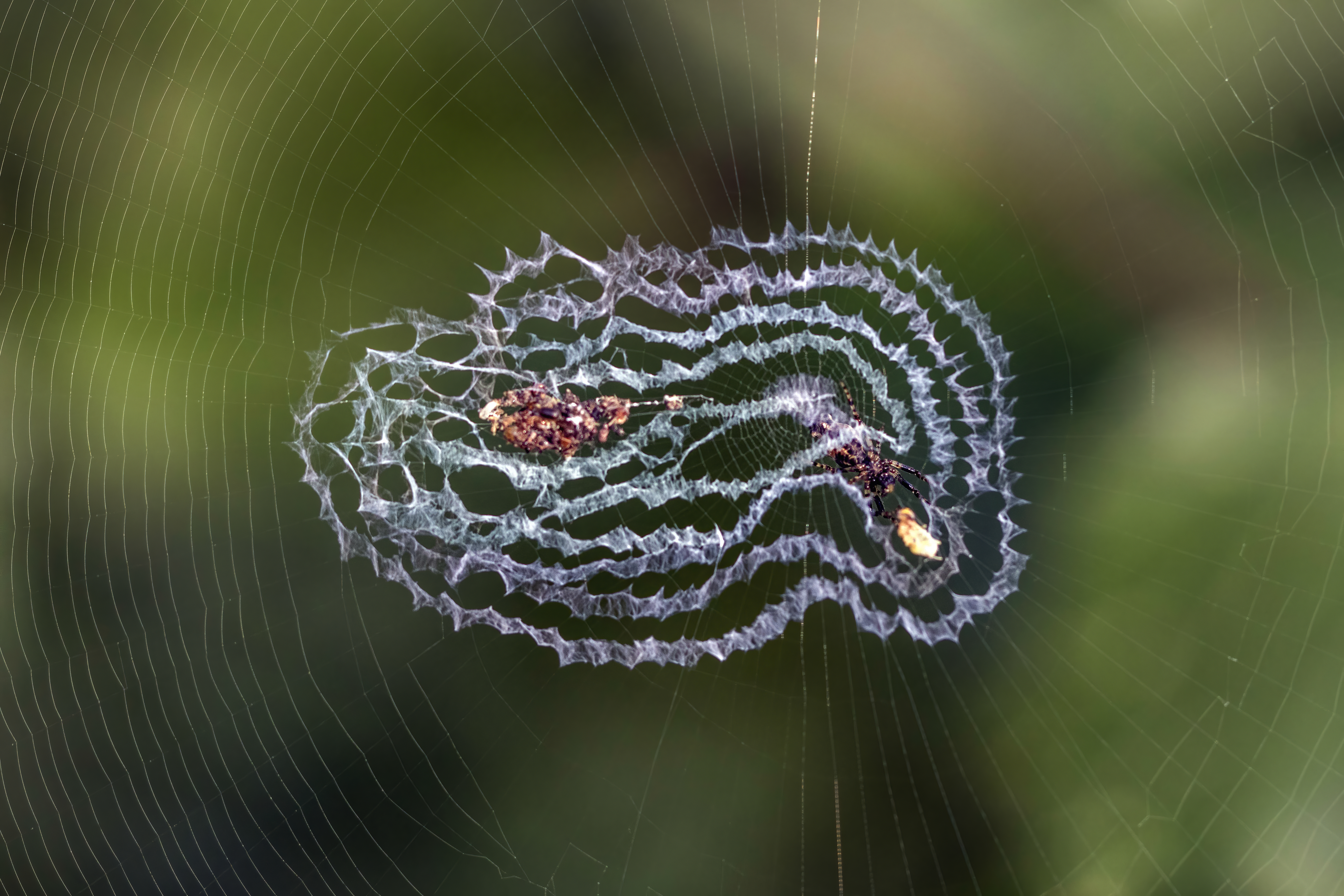
Oval spiral Cyclosa sp., India

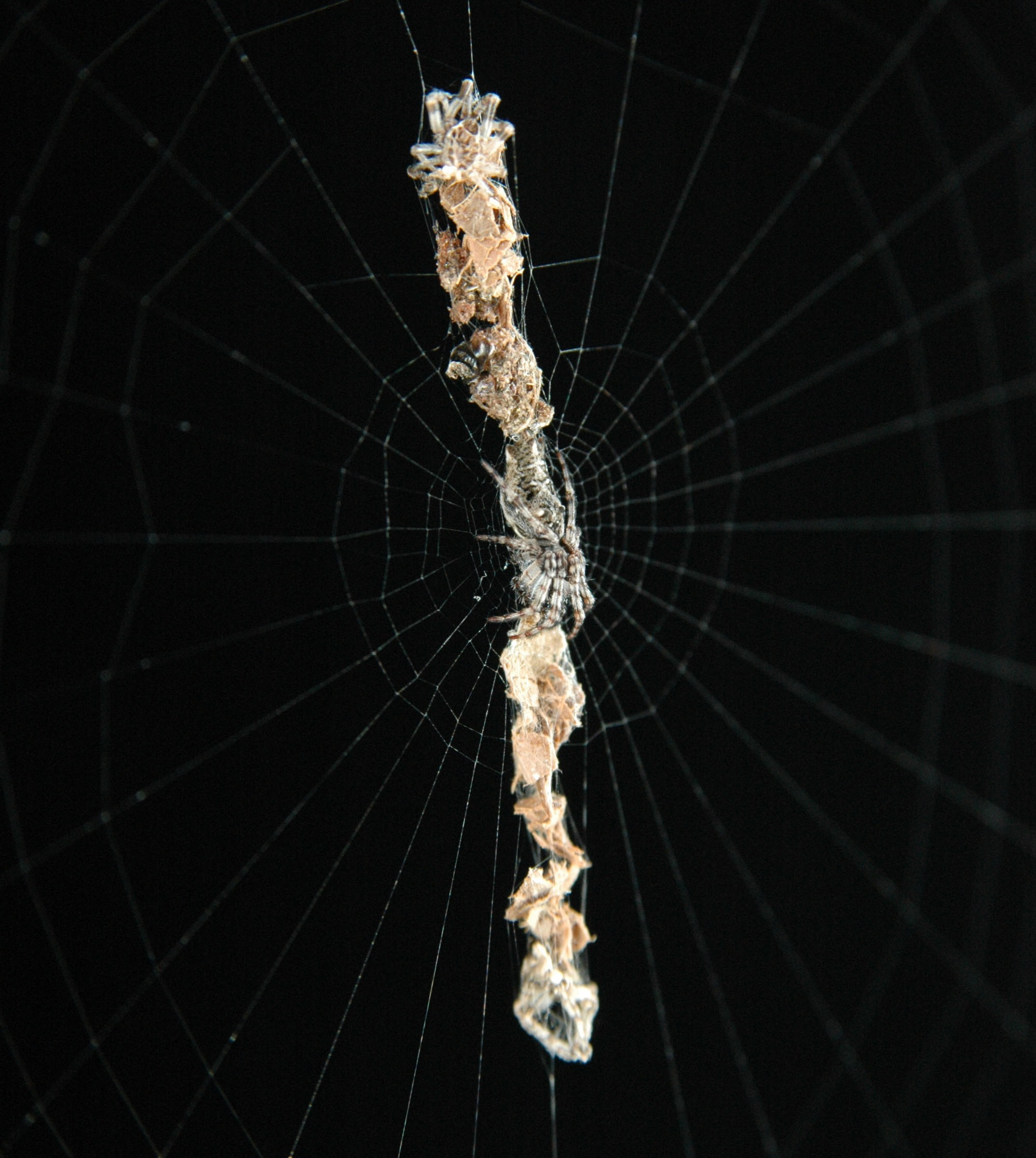
Detritus stabilimentum of Cyclosa oculata

== Function ==
There is much controversy surrounding the function of these structures, and different species likely use them for different purposes.

Originally the decorations were thought to stabilize the web (hence the term stabilimentum), though this hypothesis has since been dismissed because it was found that the decoration is only loosely attached to the web so that the actual influence on the stability could only be minor.

Notable is the fact that stabilimentum-building spiders are largely diurnal. It has been suggested that stabilimenta could protect the spider by either camouflaging it (by breaking up its outline) or making it appear larger (by extending its outline). The specialized stabilimenta of Cyclosa are hypothesized to function as a full-scale decoy. By creating a silhouette resembling a larger, potentially threatening or non-prey spider species, the structure misdirects the attacks of visually hunting predators such as birds and damselflies away from the smaller, real spider. The structure's appearance has also been discussed as a possible example of bird dropping mimicry, suggesting a multifaceted visual defense. The fact that no orb weavers that build stabilimenta construct protective retreats and that no retreat-building species construct stabilimenta at least strongly suggests that these structures have a protective function, and that stabilimenta may be equivalents of protective retreats.

Another hypothesis is that they make the web visible and therefore animals such as birds are less likely to damage the spider's web. More recent work (2016) has leaned toward this latter hypothesis, further finding that food capture was reduced by their presence. The authors note that regardless of function, there is a high cost to building a stabilimentum, and therefore the benefit must be equally large.

The other dominating hypothesis is that web decorations attract prey by reflecting ultraviolet light. Light in the ultraviolet part of the spectrum is known to be attractive to many species of insects.

Another hypothesis is that the purpose of the stabilimentum is to attract the male of the species to the web when the female is ready to reproduce. A limited study carried out in the Calahonda area of Spain in the summer of 1992 showed that there was a positive correlation between the presence of a male in the webs of Argiope lobata and the presence of a stabilimentum. Many other hypotheses have also been proposed, such as thermoregulation, stress, or regulation of excess silk. At least one species has been observed to vibrate the web, while positioned in the stabilimentum when approached by a body the size of a human.

While many Uloborus species construct stabilimenta, Uloborus gibbosus does not; it usually rests at the edge of its orb and drops to the ground if disturbed. This is thought to support the web camouflage hypothesis. In contrast, the strongly UV-reflecting stabilimentum of the uloborid Octonoba sybotides was found to be attractive to Drosophila flies.

Several evolutionary models were proposed for the inconsistency in function across species. Starks argued that although these hypotheses seemingly conflict, they might not be mutually exclusive, and suggested that we could take a hierarchical approach to model this problem: the predominant factor leading to stabilimentum production (i.e., the main function of the decoration) in each population might be different depending on the prey-and-predating context of that population. For example, in an environment where the food is abundant but predation pressure is high, the food resources are less important than prey avoidance. Therefore, the stabilimentum might have little to no effect on attracting prey but functions well as a distraction for predators. Walter offered a similar but more specific solution. He stated that the function of stabilimenta might not even be pattern or species-specific. Instead, he hypothesized that the visual signaling effect of stabilimenta might be derived from some non-signaling trait that is connected to other aspects of web-building behavior, such as silk disposition; this behavior was then selected preferentially to the specific ecological environment and therefore would be displayed through different patterns and functions among various habitats.

In Cyclosa argenteoalba, web decorations were found to support Starks' hypothesis above in that they do not attract prey and instead deter predators. This was determined through experiments where the spiders produced longer silk decorations when there was an increased predation risk, but were not affected by the amount of available prey.

== Materials ==
While the most conspicuous and well-studied decorations are constructed entirely of silk (for example in Argiope), some spiders combine silk with other items such as egg sacs and debris (for example in Cyclosa). For Cyclosa species, the structure is composed mainly of scavenged prey carcasses and plant detritus. It seems likely that these decorations camouflage the spider, thus protecting it from predators.

Something different occurs in some species of the golden orb spiders in the genus Nephila. These spiders commonly attach lines of uneaten prey items to their webs. Recent studies have shown that these items help the spider to attract more prey.

== In popular culture ==
It is claimed that, after observing stabilimenta in a spider web, E. B. White came up with the idea of a writing spider for his book Charlotte's Web.

== See also ==
- Spider web
