= Jewel spider =

Jewel spider is the common name of several different species of orb weaver spiders:

- Araneus gemmoides, the North American jewel spider
- Austracantha minax, the Australian jewel spider
- Gasteracantha cancriformis, sometimes known as the jewel box spider or jewel spider
- Gasteracantha fornicata, the northern jewelled spider of Australia
