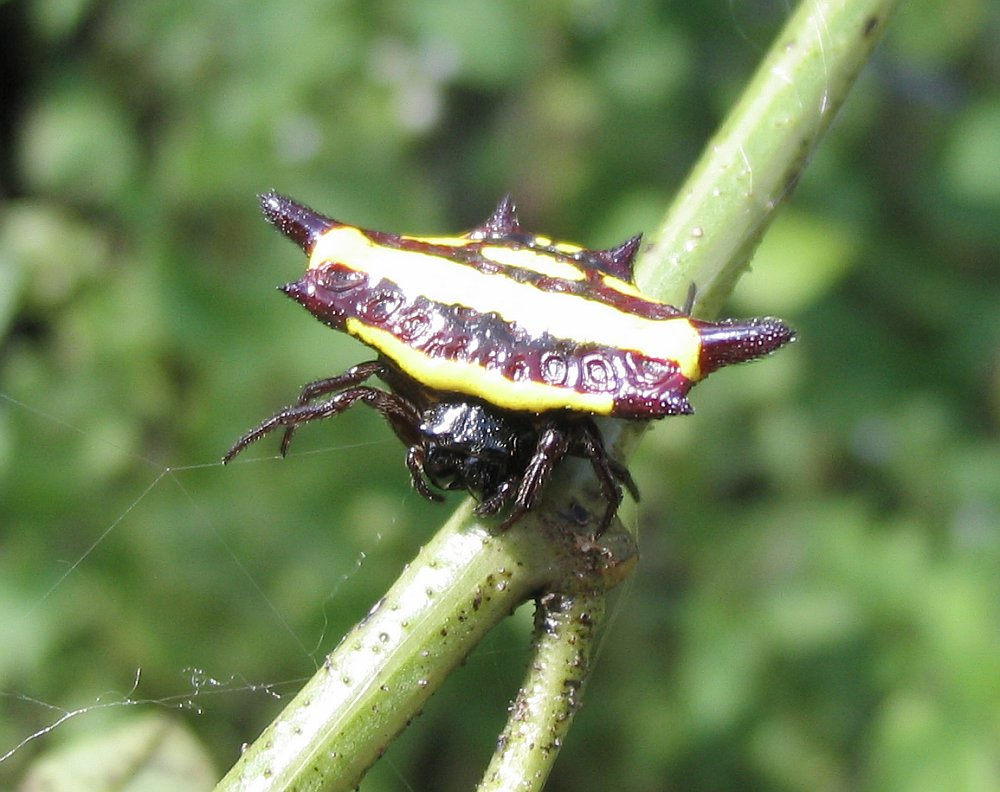
- In Northern Queensland, Australia

Scientific classification
- Kingdom: Animalia
- Phylum: Arthropoda
- Subphylum: Chelicerata
- Class: Arachnida
- Order: Araneae
- Infraorder: Araneomorphae
- Family: Araneidae
- Genus: Gasteracantha
- Species: G. fornicata

Binomial name
- Gasteracantha fornicata Fabricius, 1775

Synonyms
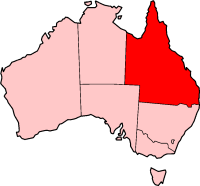
- Aranea fornicata Fabricius, 1775; Gasteracantha vittata L. Koch, 1871; Gasteracantha bradleyi Thorell, 1881; Gasteracantha fornicata is found in Queensland, Australia

= Gasteracantha fornicata =

Species of spider

Gasteracantha fornicata (northern jewelled spider) is a species of spiny orb-weavers (family Araneidae) found in Queensland Australia. It is similar in shape to Austracantha minax which was originally described as Gasteracantha minax. It was described by Johan Christian Fabricius in 1775, the first Australian species of spider to be named and classified.

One of the synonyms of the species is Gasteracantha vittata, a name given to it by Ludwig Carl Christian Koch in 1871. However, it was later discovered that Fabricius had described the species earlier, and according to taxonomic rules, the earlier name has precedence and is the only one that should be used. Also, there are other species that were identified G. vittata at times, namely Gasteracantha irradiata (by Thorell, 1859), Gasteracantha sanguinolenta (by Keyserling, 1877) and Gasteracantha transversa (as subspecies G. v. longicornis by Strand, 1907), further complicating the issue.

G. fornicata is known for its female spiders that have a stark banded pattern along its dorsal side, with yellow or white stripes contrasting its dark-coloured body. It has small yellow or white spots along the ventral side. This spider has been described as a "sit-and-wait" predator, where it waits for small insects to approach its web. Gasteracantha fornicata is known for its circular, "orb-shaped" webs with silk tuft decorations.

== Description ==
Gasteracantha fornicata is a small spider that displays multiple morphs in size and colour. It has exoskeletal spines across its dorsal side. The wide cephalothorax structure of Gasteracantha may prevent it from being as mobile compared to spiders of similar size. Males are typically two millimeters while females grow up to twelve millimeters. Females have distinct stripes across the dorsal region that are known to attract prey. These yellow/white bands starkly contrast with the spider's dark coloured body. Like other orb-weaving spiders the bright colouration of the spider has been shown to help attract prey. On the ventral side, the body is darker and has small yellow spots. Like other spiny spiders, Gasteracantha fornicata has a hard exoskeleton with spines along the dorsal side for predatorial protection. The bright colouration of the spiders have been suggested to signal to predators that they are not ideal prey.

Female Gasteracantha fornicata spiders have two different morphs, one with bright yellow bands, and another with white bands (spectral curves at 447 nanometers and 496 nanometers). Although the spider can have white-coloured stripes, it does not possess the same UV properties as the closely related Gasteracanthra cancriformis. Different coloured morphs inhabit different regions of the rainforest habitat with varying frequencies. Changes in light exposure of brighter forest clearings and cloudier sky overhang regions, create microhabitats for Gasteracantha fornicata. Levels of cloudiness serve as a threshold marker for colour morph frequency. Specifically, white morphs are found more frequently in darker areas because they have a better contrast against cloudy skies.

== Population structure, speciation, and phylogeny ==
Gastericantha fornicata is a member of the family Araneidae, also known as the orb-weaver spiders. Spiders within this group all build circular, "orb" shaped webs. A diverse range of spiders within this family have been shown to adorn their webs with decorations like Gasteracantha fornicata (seventy-eight species across twenty -two genera). Gasteracantha (gaster, abodomen; acantha, spiny) spiders are known for their spiny protrusions as well as bright designs. This spider is suggested to be closely related to Gasteracantha minax.

== Habitat and distribution ==
Gasteracantha fornicata originates from the Northeastern Australian rainforest. This spider has been found strictly in the rainforest, specifically at the border of the tree line as a microhabitat. Variations in cloud coverage and sunny clearing within the habitat have been found to impact the colouration frequencies of female spiders. In addition, long periods of rainfall within the region render their webs ineffective.

== Diet ==
=== Predatory feeding ===
The diet of Gasteracantha fornicata is largely consistent with that of other spiders in the genus. This includes small dipterans (flies), small hymenopterans (members of the bee family), Orthoptera, Odonata, and Lepidoptera. The range of prey species does not vary with spider colour. Building a web is the main foraging cost of this species.

Gasteracantha fornicata orients itself and its web to take advantage of light and dark patches in the vegetation. The light and dark bands mimic the environment and serve to attract prey as a part of the colour-as-prey-attraction hypothesis. These spiders effectively utilize their colouration to have the best web visibility and attractiveness within their habitat. Prey typically mistaken the light patches as forager or mating sites, serving as a strategy for Gasteracantha fornicata. This strategy has varying effects on the capture environment of yellow striped spiders versus the white striped spiders. Yellow striped spiders have been found to have the largest number of prey-capture events when it stood in greatest chromatic contrast with the surrounding area (the yellow stripes stand out the most when compared to other colours in the environment). White striped spiders best capture prey when in achromatic contrast with the surrounding area (the brightness of the white stands out the most when compared to the luminescence of the environment). Neither capture rate, prey consumption rate, nor capture success was found to be significantly different between the two morphs.

The colouration of Gasteracantha fornicata has also been shown to take advantage of prey visual systems of hymenopterans and dipterans. Using an insect colour vision modeling, the white striped version of Gasteracantha fornicata are indistinguishable from sympatric flowers, and the yellow striped version are perceptually indistinguishable from yellow flowers. It has been shown that hiding and covering the distinctive stripes of Gasteracantha fornicata have contributed to diminished prey acquisition.

== Webs ==
=== Web type ===
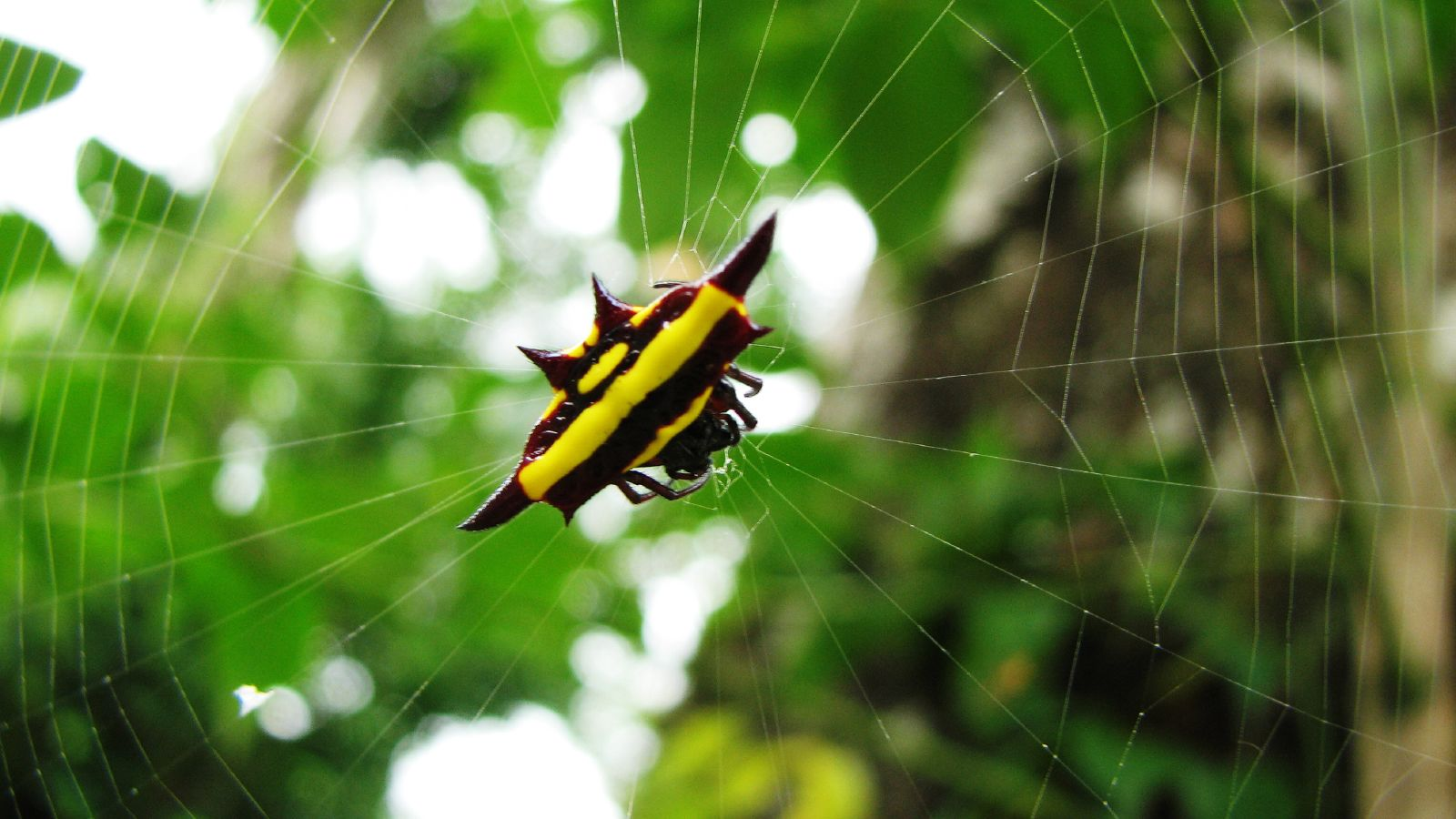
On its web

Gasteracantha fornicata creates a circular "orb" shaped web, typical of the family Araneidae. Gasteracantha spiders are known to have particularly strong webs compared to other spider species. Like other spiders within the family, Gasteracantha fornicata utilizes a "sit-and-wait" strategy to capture prey. Unlike other "sit-and-wait" predators however, instead of secretive colouration and camouflaging, Gasteracantha fornicata is brightly coloured. This colouration aids spiders in prey capture as a part of the "colour-as-prey-attractant" hypothesis. Spiders with their stark bands are able to attract prey to the web at higher rates compared to spiders that were painted over to conceal their stripes.

=== Prey capture technique ===
Aside from their colouration, members of the Gasteracantha genus frequently display silk tufts as web decoration, placing the tufts along the frame of the web. These lures have been hypothesized to visually attract prey as a "sensory trap"; however, presence of web decoration has not been attributed to better feeding success. These decorations also have been hypothesized to serve as a detractor for birds or other predators. In non-decorated webs, predators and large animals are more likely to destroy the web, even when the presence of the spider on the web was controlled for. This hypothesis has also been put into question because Gasteracantha build their webs in already sheltered areas in shrubs and rainforest understory, regions that are unlikely to be disrupted by larger predators. While decorations help protect destruction from other creatures, because of the rainforest habitat, webs are frequently rendered ineffective during extended rainstorm periods. In addition, no evidence has found that Gasteracantha fornicata makes assumptions of optimal foraging sites when building their webs.

== Reproduction and life cycle ==
=== Life-span ===
The life cycle of Gasteracantha fornicata starts from eggs. The egg sac of Gasteracantha fornicata is made of fluorescent green silk. It measures twelve to fifteen millimeters at its widest point and is shaped as a three-dimensional oval. Gasteracantha fornicata grows through a progressive series of instars. After its series of transitions, its final adult form has a highly sclerotized skeleton and namesake spinal projections. The total body mass and appearance of the spider is subject to change throughout the lifetime. When resources are scarce or when rainfall is low, the spider is found to lose mass and become less vibrant in colour.

== Mating ==
=== Male/female interaction and courtship ===
A strong sexual dimorphism is present in the males and females of Gasteracantha fornicata. Smaller males (2mm) live on the outskirts of the web compared to females (12mm) and possess a different shape compared to females. Whereas sexual cannibalism drives the development of larger males, Gasteracantha spiders do not participate in this practice. To court the female, the small sized male must inconspicuously travel to the female at the center of the orb-web without freezing or being shaken off by female movement. It then mounts the female and copulates. This courtship behaviour is unique to the genus Gasteracantha. Other spiders in the Araneidae family will create a mating thread within the female's central hub where the female will follow vibratory cues to meet the male.

== Enemies ==
=== Predators ===
Potential predators of this spider include avians and humans. The webs of Gasteracantha fornicata and other decorated web spiders are described to have anti-predatorial properties, explained by the warning hypothesis. In particular, the conspicuous decorations of the webs of Gasteracantha fornicata' draw larger creature's attention to the web and prevent them from destruction. The fused head and body spikes (cephalothorax region) also serve as a defense mechanism. While the mud dauber wasp (Sceliphron laetum) solely uses orb-weaving spiders to feed its young, it does not feed the larvae with Gasteracantha because of the particularly hard exoskeleton. The brightly coloured body has been described as a possible aposematic signal, where having bright colouration signals to larger predators not to hunt this spider.

== Protective colouration and behaviour ==
The distinctive yellow bands on the female Gasteracantha fornicata are the result of biochemical pigments. These bands contain ommochrome pigments that absorb at roughly five-hundred nanometers to selectively absorb different kinds of light.Gasteracantha fornicata has been shown to mimic spatial, spectral, and symmetric patterns of local flowers to intercept prey at their webs. The pattern of Gasteracantha fornicata possesses a striped, radial pattern of yellow/white and black that shares the same attractive cues of flowers to the prey insects looking for nectar and pollen. Whereas colour alone was shown to be attractive to prey, the pattern was not sufficient to have an effect on prey capture. However, other studies have shown that the orientation of stripes is significant.

== Physiology ==
=== Thermoregulation ===
Thermoregulation of Gasteracantha fornicata is related to the amount of sun it gets along the rainforest floor. This sun exposure can be further detailed in the posture the spider takes in the web, the Fabian position. In the Fabian position, the spider is positioned parallel to the direction of sunlight along its longitudinal axis to maximize the level of exposure. Whereas some spiders construct web structures to shade themselves, webs have not shown to serve as a cooling mechanism in Gasteracantha for thermoregulation.

== Interactions with humans and livestock ==
Gasteracantha fornicata was the first spider to be classified with the European system from Australia. J. Banks or C. Solander first collected this spider on a voyage with James Cook in 1770 (see first voyage of James Cook). On this expedition, the spider was likely collected from the Endeavour River near present-day Cooktown.

== Gallery ==
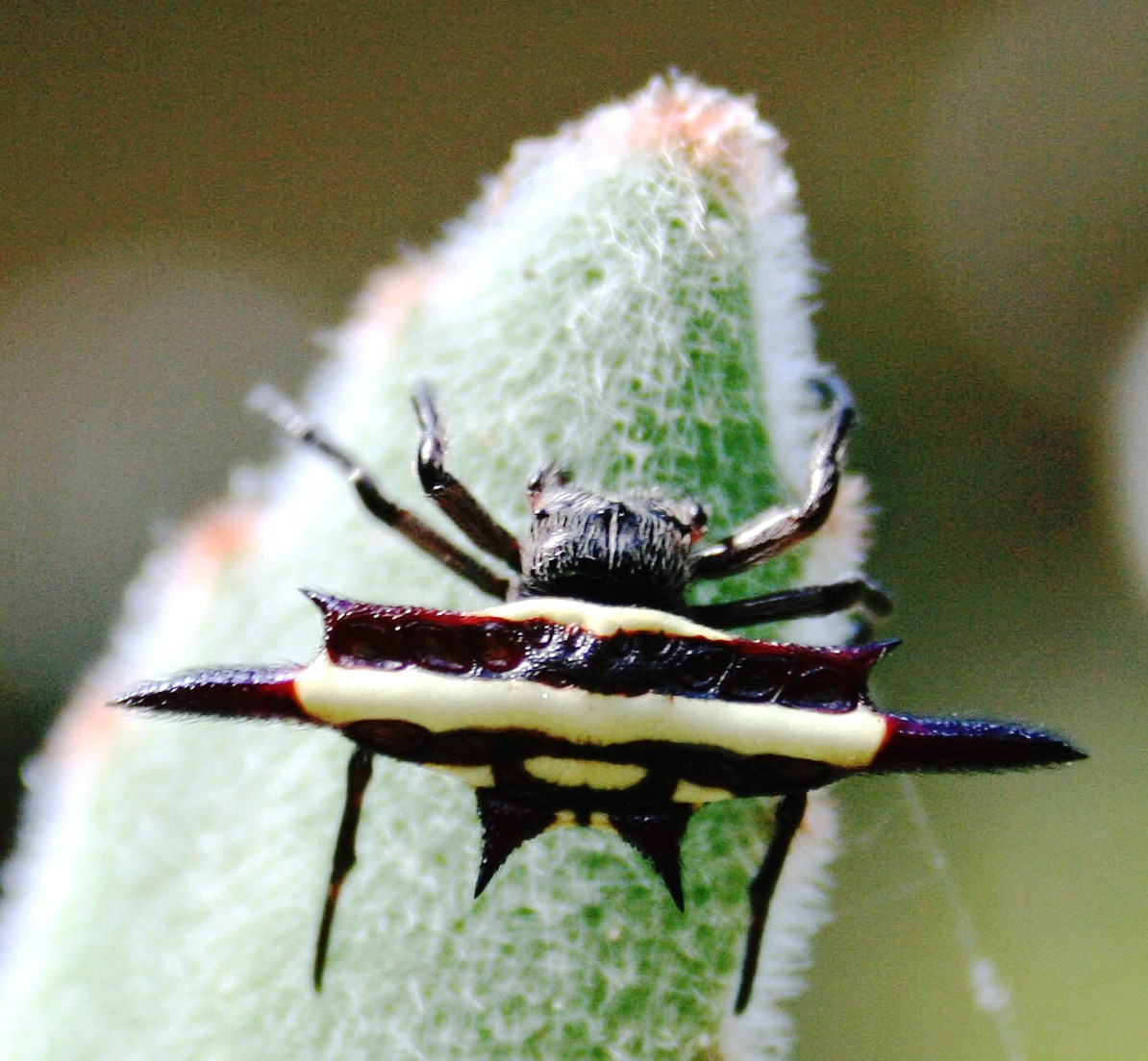
In Cooktown

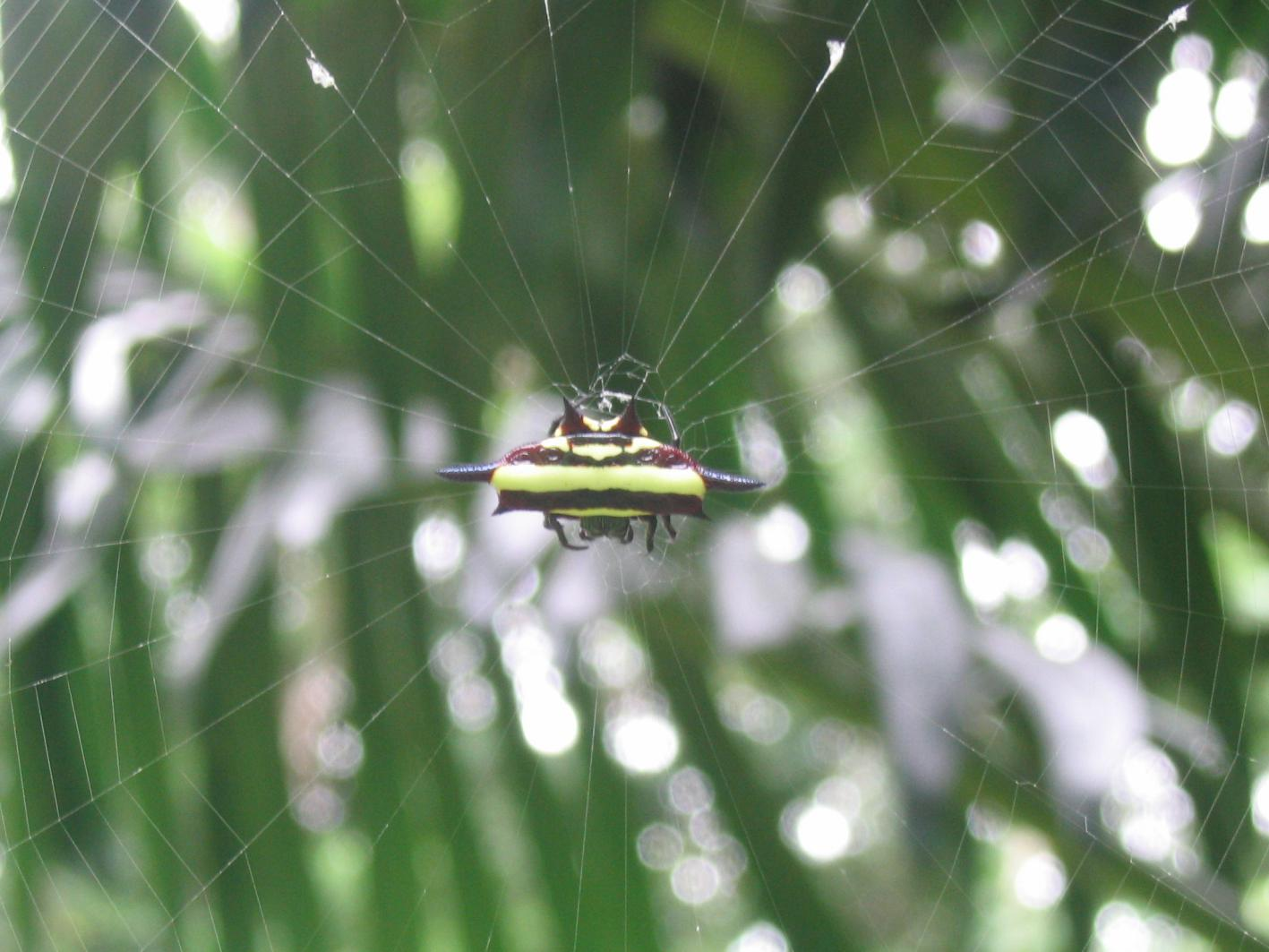
In Daintree, Queensland

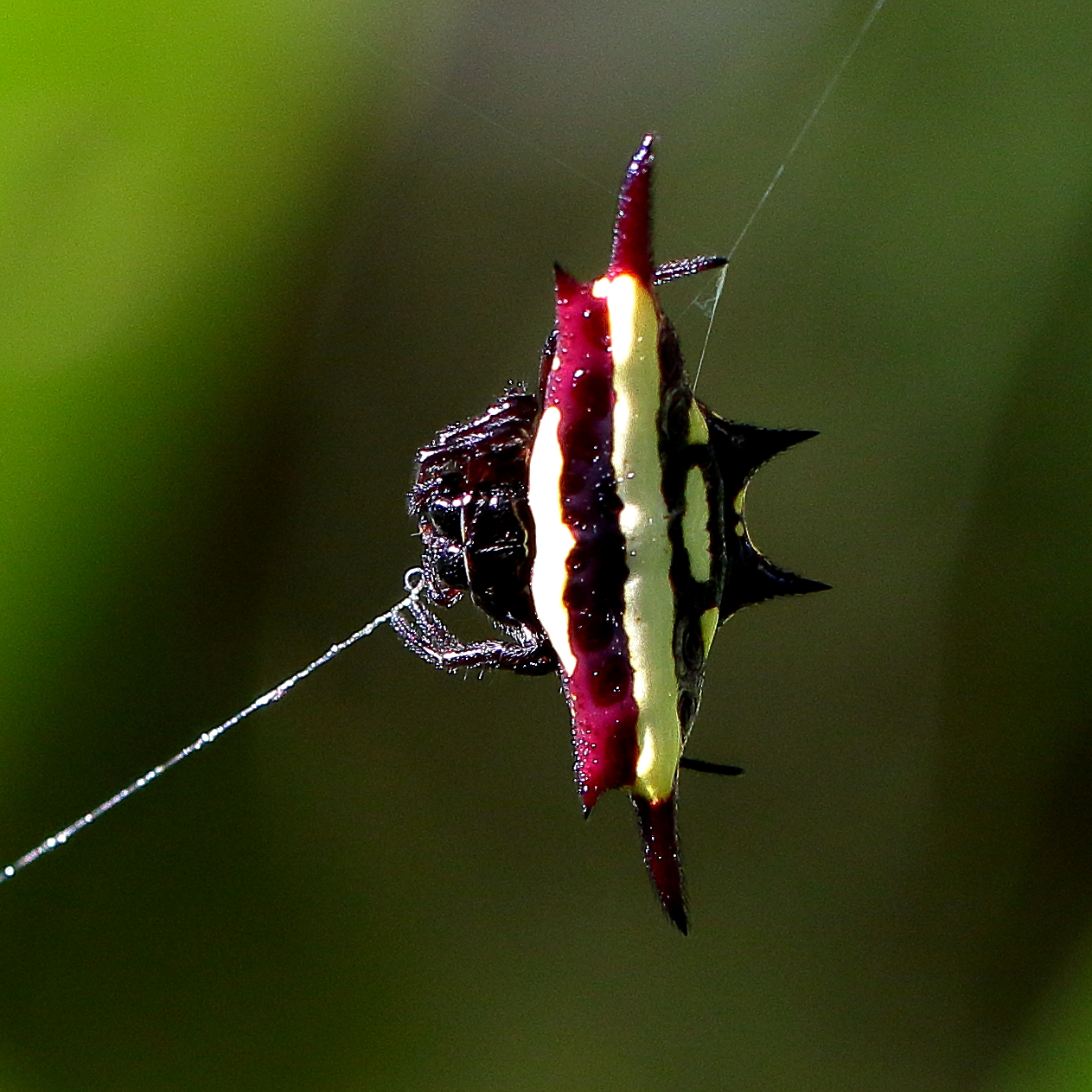
