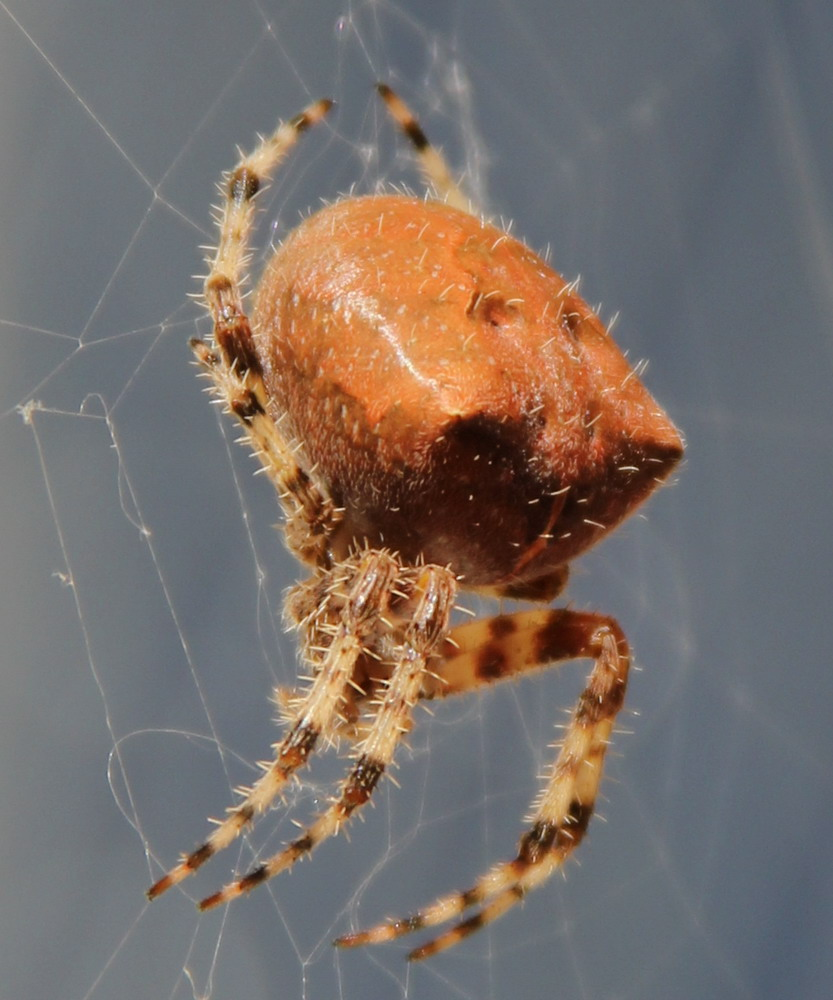

Conservation status
- Secure (NatureServe)

Scientific classification
- Kingdom: Animalia
- Phylum: Arthropoda
- Subphylum: Chelicerata
- Class: Arachnida
- Order: Araneae
- Infraorder: Araneomorphae
- Family: Araneidae
- Genus: Araneus
- Species: A. gemmoides

Binomial name
- Araneus gemmoides Chamberlin & Ivie, 1935

= Araneus gemmoides =

Jewel spider

Species of spider

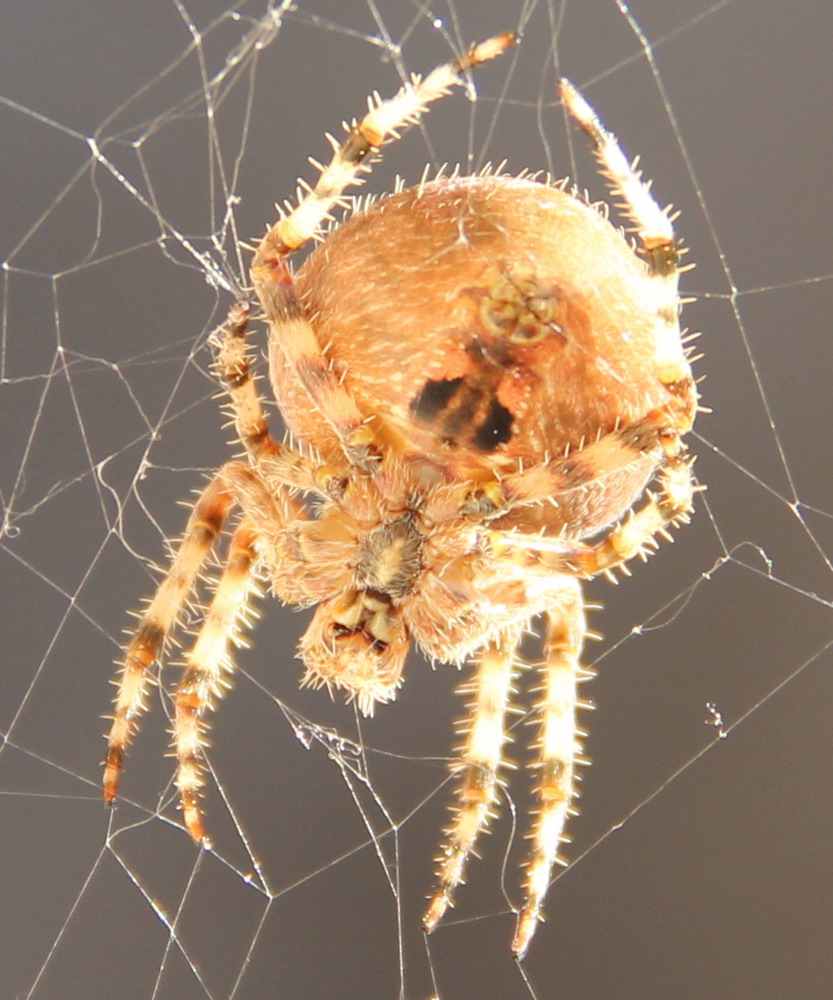
A view of A. gemmoides from below.

Araneus gemmoides, commonly known as the jewel spider (a name shared with Austracantha minax) and cat-faced spider (a name shared with Araneus gemma), is a common, outdoor, orb-weaver spider found in Canada and the USA. It is considered harmless and has a low-toxicity venom. A. gemmoides is a useful natural predator for insects.

A. gemmoides makes its webs near lights, closed spaces, and on the sides of buildings. It can also be found under wood, overhangs, or guarded places such as animal burrows. The species occurs in varying colors, but is easily identified by the two horn-shaped growths on its relatively large abdomen. Its color changes from summer to winter.

The females die within days of laying a single egg sac with hundreds of eggs. Egg sacs can survive over winter, and the emerging spiderlings eat their siblings. The babies ride strands of silk in warm air currents, which are able to transport them to locations miles away.

Females have a larger abdomen and head. Males have much smaller abdomens and longer bodies. Both eat a variety of food, ranging from fish flies, house flies, and mosquitoes to other small spiders.
