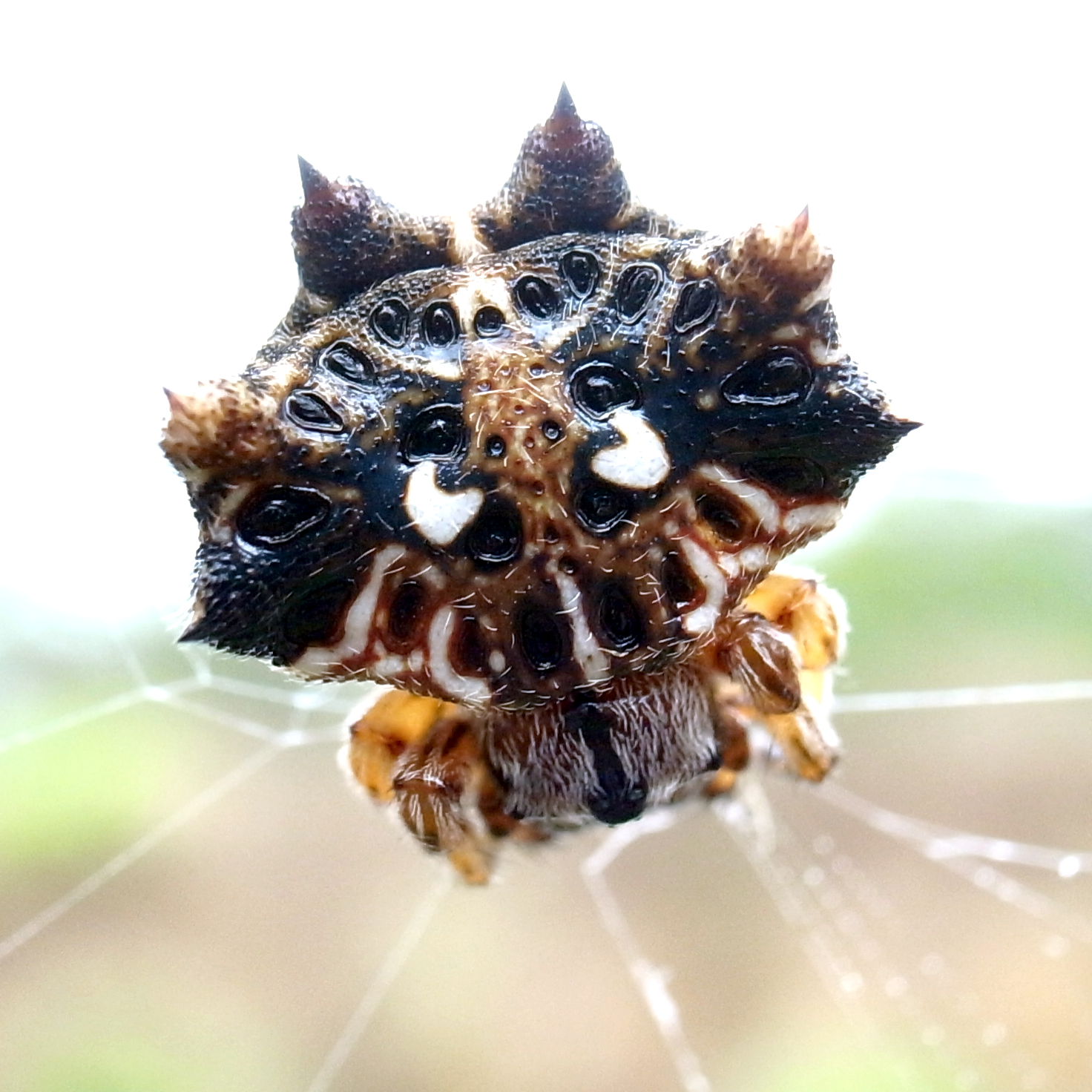
- T. brevispina, female from Taiwan
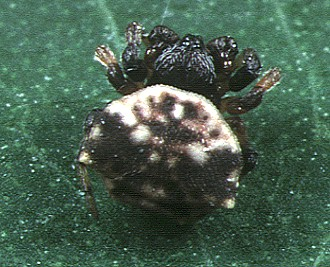
- T. brevispina, male from Japan

Scientific classification
- Kingdom: Animalia
- Phylum: Arthropoda
- Subphylum: Chelicerata
- Class: Arachnida
- Order: Araneae
- Infraorder: Araneomorphae
- Family: Araneidae
- Genus: Thelacantha; Hasselt, 1882
- Species: T. brevispina

Binomial name
- Thelacantha brevispina (Doleschall, 1857)

Synonyms
- Plectana brevispina Doleschall, 1857

= Thelacantha =

Genus of spiders

Thelacantha (Asian spinybacked orbweaver) is a genus of orb-weaver spiders containing the single species, Thelacantha brevispina. It was first described by A. W. M. van Hasselt in 1882, and has been found in Australia, Madagascar, the Indian subcontinent, and Southeast Asia, as well as parts of Japan. It has also been introduced into Hawaii. T. brevispina is closely related to those in the genus Gasteracantha and was briefly synonymized with it in 1859, but revalidated in 1974. Saito described three other Thelacantha species in 1933, which were later synonymized with T. brevispina.

== Description ==
Females grow to about 6 to 10 millimetres (0.24 to 0.39 in) long, while males reach a size of 3 to 5 millimetres (0.12 to 0.20 in). Females have six abdominal spines ending in distinct sharp points. Most have two large white spots on the upper surface of their abdomens, which are otherwise mottled with black, brown, and white patterns.

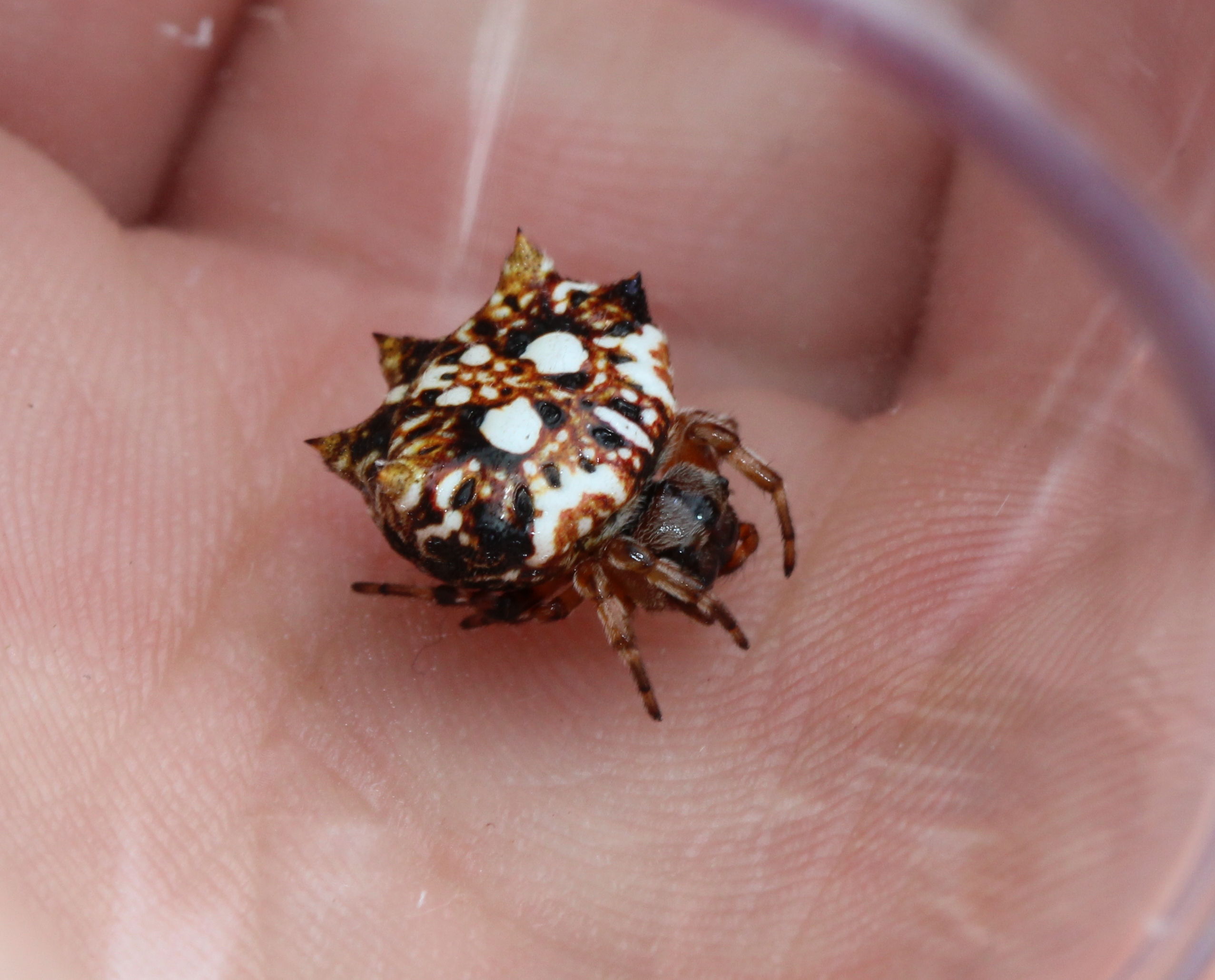
Large female T. brevispina from Hilo, Hawai'i ('Akaka Falls region)

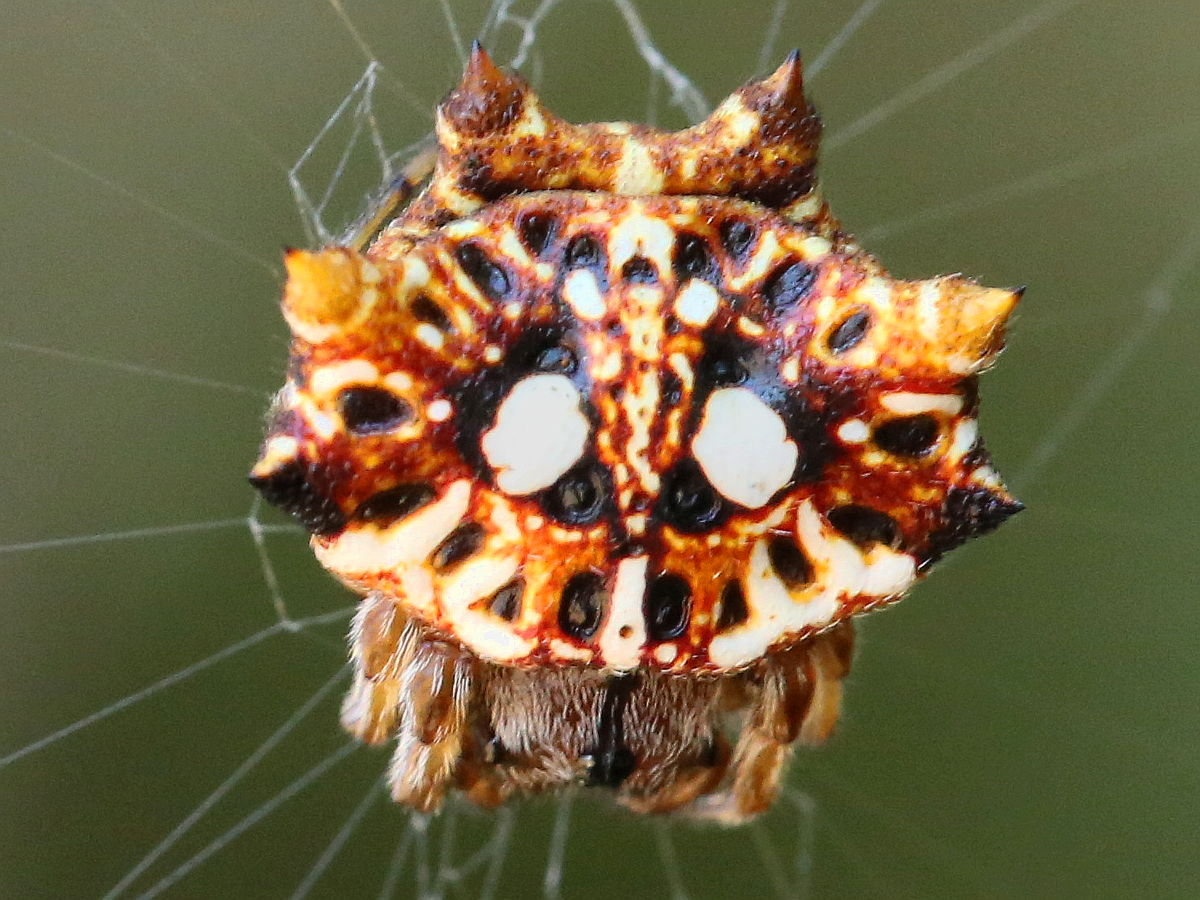
Female at Molokai, Hawaii

== Taxonomy ==
T. brevispina has often been misidentified as Gasteracantha mammosa, which is now G. cancriformis. It has gone through a checkered name history, with many synonyms:

- Gasteracantha alba Vinson, 1863
- Gasteracantha borbonica Vinson, 1863
- Plectana brevispina Doleschall, 1857
- Gasteracantha brevispina (Doleschall, 1857)
- Thelacantha brevispina (Doleschall, 1857)
- Gasteracantha canningensis Stoliczka, 1869
- Sitticus distinguendus Fontana et al., 1996
- Attulus distinguendus (Fontana et al., 1996)
- Plectana flavida Doleschall, 1859
- Gasteracantha flavida (Doleschall, 1859)
- Gasteracantha formosana Saitō, 1933
- Gasteracantha guttata Thorell, 1859
- Stanneoclavis latronum Simon, 1890
- Actinacantha maculata Karsch, 1878
- Gasteracantha mammeata Thorell, 1859
- Gasteracantha mastoidea L. Koch, 1872
- Stanneoclavis mastoidea (L. Koch, 1872)
- Gasteracantha observatrix O. Pickard-Cambridge, 1879
- Plectana roseolimbata Doleschall, 1859
- Gasteracantha sola Saitō, 1933
- Gasteracantha sparsa Saitō, 1933
- Gasteracantha suminata L. Koch, 1871
- Stanneoclavis suminata (L. Koch, 1871)
Diversity of females from Japan

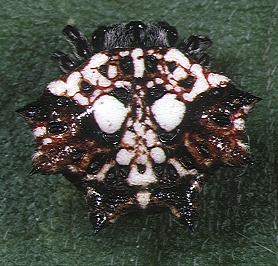

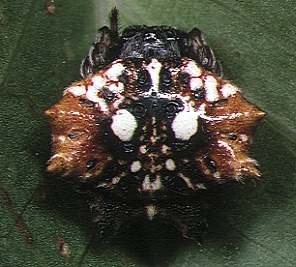

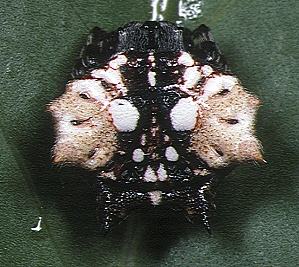

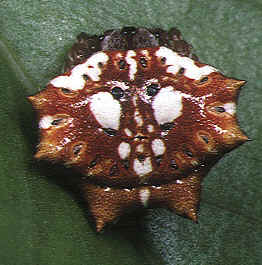

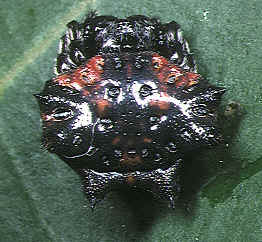

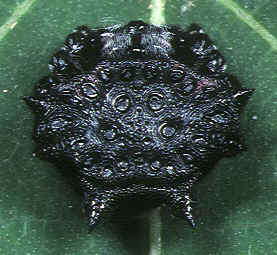

== See also ==
- Gasteracantha cancriformis
