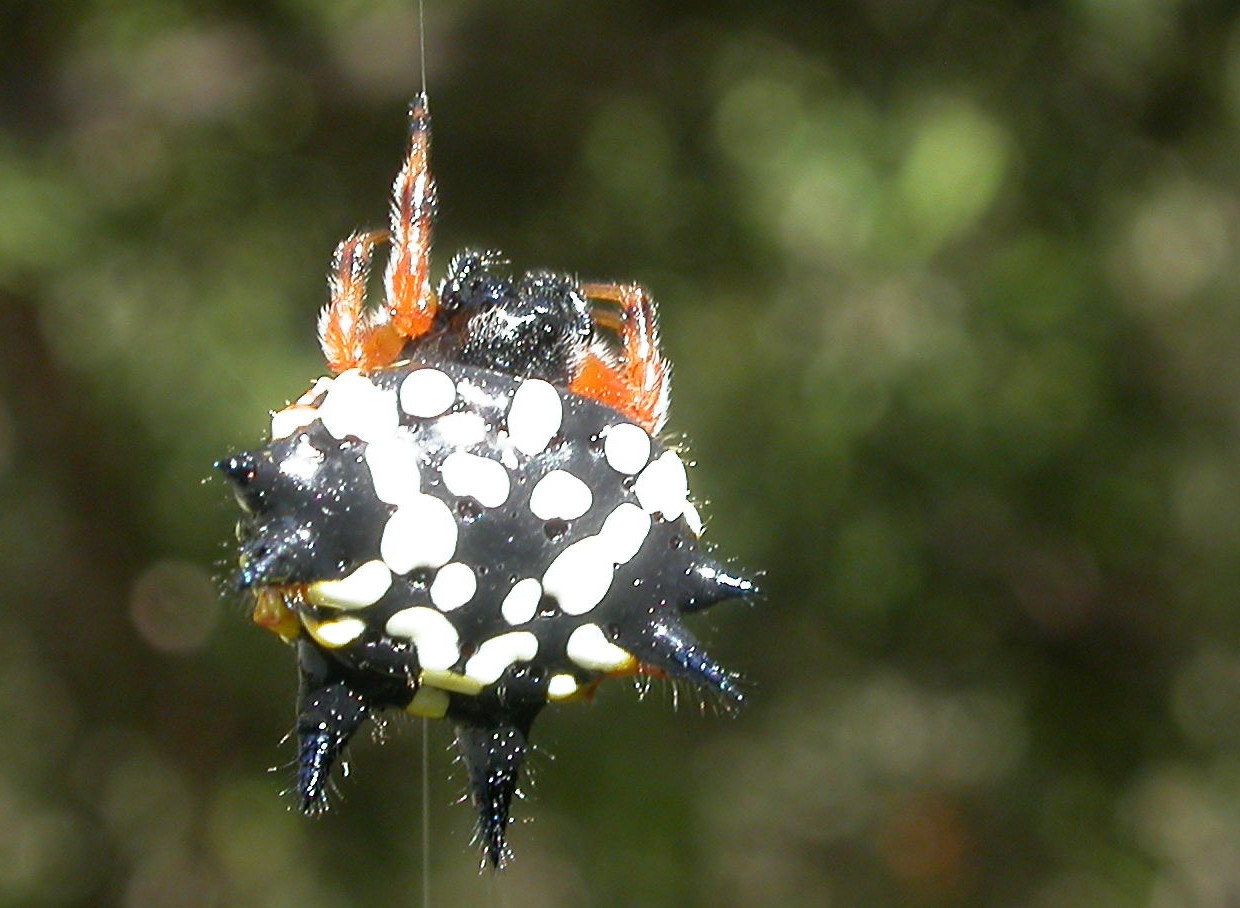
- Female from Aranda
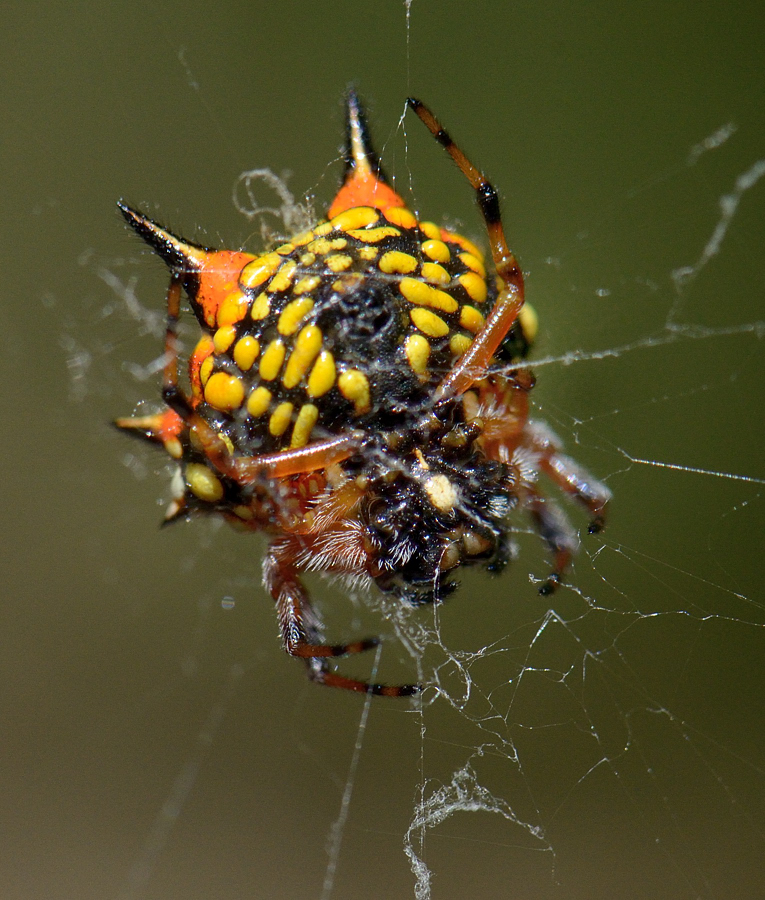
- Female from Darlington

Scientific classification
- Kingdom: Animalia
- Phylum: Arthropoda
- Subphylum: Chelicerata
- Class: Arachnida
- Order: Araneae
- Infraorder: Araneomorphae
- Family: Araneidae
- Genus: Austracantha; Dahl, 1914
- Species: A. minax

Binomial name
- Austracantha minax (Thorell, 1859)

Subspecies
- See text

Synonyms
- Gasteracantha astrigera L. Koch, 1871; Gasteracantha flavomaculata Keyserling, 1865; Gasteracantha lugubris L. Koch, 1871; Gasteracantha minax Thorell, 1859; Isacantha minax (Thorell, 1859)

= Austracantha =

Jewel spider

Genus of spiders

Austracantha is a genus of spider with a single species, Austracantha minax, commonly known as the jewel spider or the Christmas spider. It is a member of the family Araneidae (the orb-weavers) and is endemic to Australia. They are relatively small spiders, reaching a maximum total body length of only around 12 mm (0.47 in) for females, and 5 mm (0.20 in) for males. Their abdomen has six distinctive projections ("spines") that makes them easy to identify. They are predominantly a shiny black, with variable white, yellow, and orange patterns. Melanistic forms also occur during autumn. They are facultatively gregarious, and can be found in large aggregations of overlapping orb webs. They feed on small flying insects that get entangled in their webs. They are harmless to humans, though the webs can be a nuisance for bushwalkers. They are most abundant during the summer months.

== Taxonomy and nomenclature ==
Austracantha minax is most commonly known as "jewel spiders" due to their body colouration. This may sometimes be specified further as "Australian jewel spiders" due to the common name being shared with the unrelated North American jewel spider Araneus gemmoides, as well as the widespread jewel box spider Gasteracantha cancriformis. In some parts of Australia they are also widely known as "Christmas spiders" because they are most numerous during the summer months (December and January). Other common names for the species include "six-spined spiders" and "spiny spiders" in reference to the spine-like projections on their abdomens.

Austracantha minax is classified under the monotypic genus Austracantha of the orb-weaver family Araneidae. The generic name is derived from Latin auster ("south") and Greek ἄκανθα (ákantha, "thorn"). The specific name is from Latin mināx ("jutting out" or "projecting").

It was first described in 1859 by the Swedish arachnologist Tamerlan Thorell from a female specimen recovered from Sydney. He classified it under the genus Gasteracantha. In 1914, the German arachnologist Friedrich Dahl moved it to its own subgenus, Austracantha, within Gasteracantha. Austracantha was elevated to genus in 1974 by the French arachnologist Michel Emerit. Austracantha minax has five recognised subspecies.

=== Subspecies ===
The five subspecies of Austracantha minax are the following:

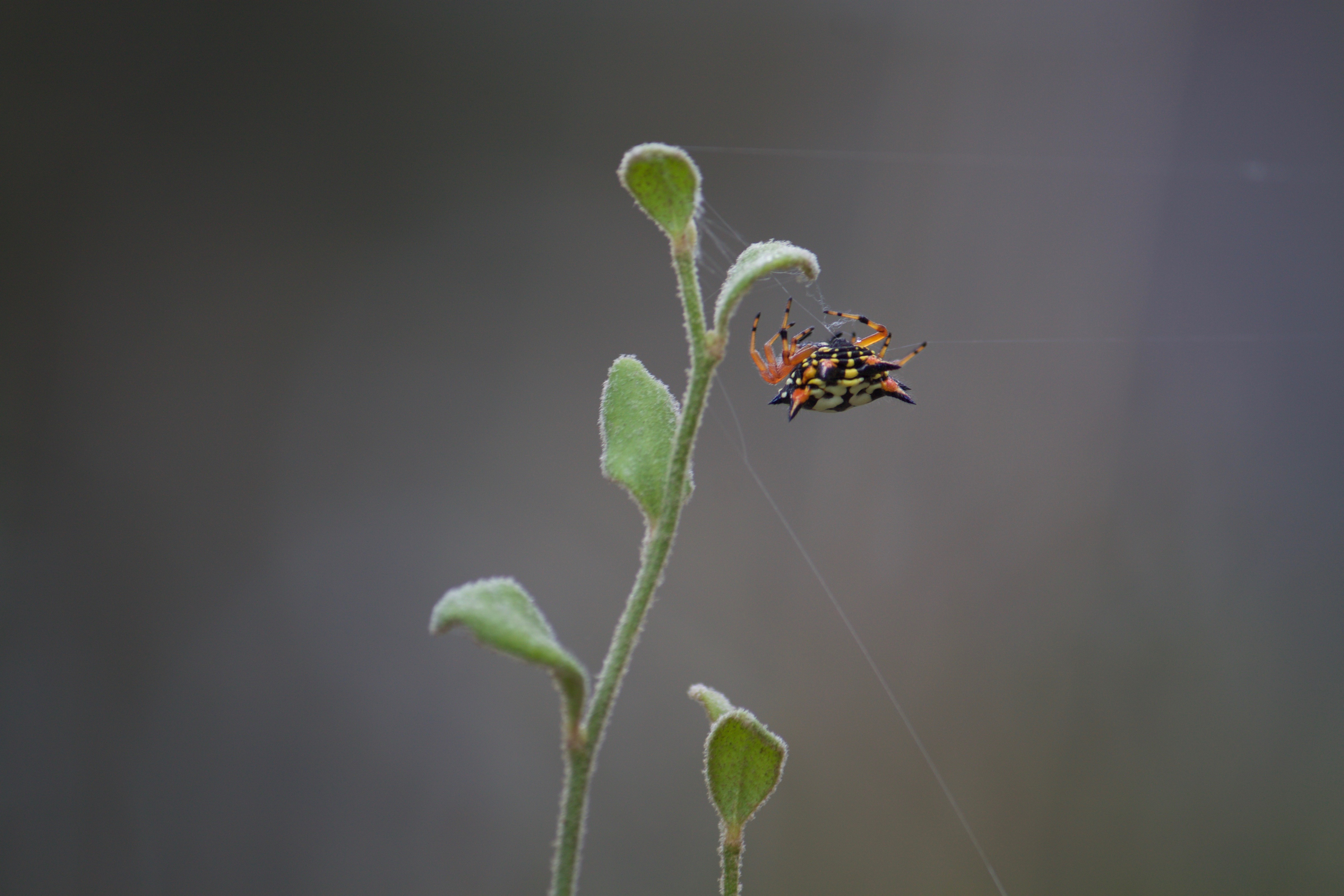
A jewel spider building a web

Synonyms indicated by (=)

- Austracantha minax astrigera (L. Koch, 1871) - Found in mainland Australia. Characterised by an abdomen that is mainly black on top and patterned with yellow on the bottom surfaces. The spines are thicker and curved, with the rear spines visibly longer than the side spines. The sternum (chest) has a bright orange spot. First described by German arachnologist Ludwig Carl Christian Koch in 1871. The subspecific name is from Latin astriger ("star-bearing" or "starry").

(=) Gasteracantha astrigera L. Koch, 1871
(=) Gasteracantha minax astrigera (L. Koch, 1871)

- Austracantha minax minax (Thorell, 1859) - Found in mainland Australia and surrounding islands, including Tasmania. Characterised by yellow to orange colouration being prevalent on the bottom of the abdomen and on the legs. The spines are more slender and are barely arched. The rear spines are almost the same length as the side spines. This is the nominate subspecies.

(=) Gasteracantha minax Thorell, 1859
(=) Gasteracantha flavomaculata Keyserling, 1865
(=) Isacantha minax (Thorell, 1859)

- Austracantha minax hermitis (Hogg, 1914) - Endemic to the Montebello Islands. The abdomen is pearl grey on top. The legs, cephalothorax, and the sternum are bright orange. First described by British arachnologist Henry Roughton Hogg in 1914. The subspecific name means "from Hermite [Island]", one of the islands in the Montebello archipelago.

(=) Gasteracantha minax hermitis Hogg, 1914b

- Austracantha minax leonhardii (Strand, 1913) - Found in central Australia. Characterised by reddish cephalothorax and mandibles. The legs are brownish-yellow, with only the second and third segments from the last (the tibiae and metatarsi) showing black rings at the tip. First described by Norwegian arachnologist Embrik Strand in 1913. It is named after the German anthropologist Moritz von Leonhardi, from whose spider collection the type specimen was obtained from.

(=) Gasteracantha minax leonhardii Strand, 1913c

- Austracantha minax lugubris (L. Koch, 1871) - Found in mainland Australia. Characterised by legs and abdomen that are mostly black with no bright markings. The spines are slender and taper downwards. First described by German arachnologist Ludwig Carl Christian Koch in 1871. The subspecific name is from Latin lūgubris ("mournful" or "gloomy").

(=) Gasteracantha lugubris L. Koch, 1871
(=) Gasteracantha minax lugubris (L. Koch, 1871)

== Description ==
Diagnostic images for Austracantha minax

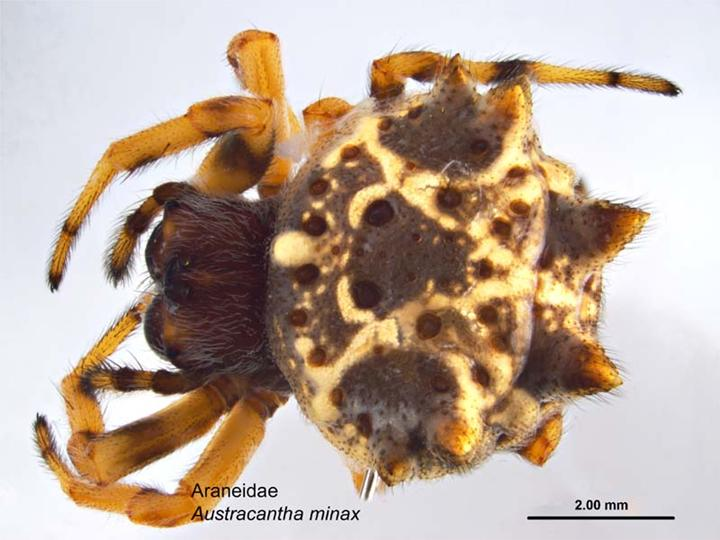
Dorsal view (female)

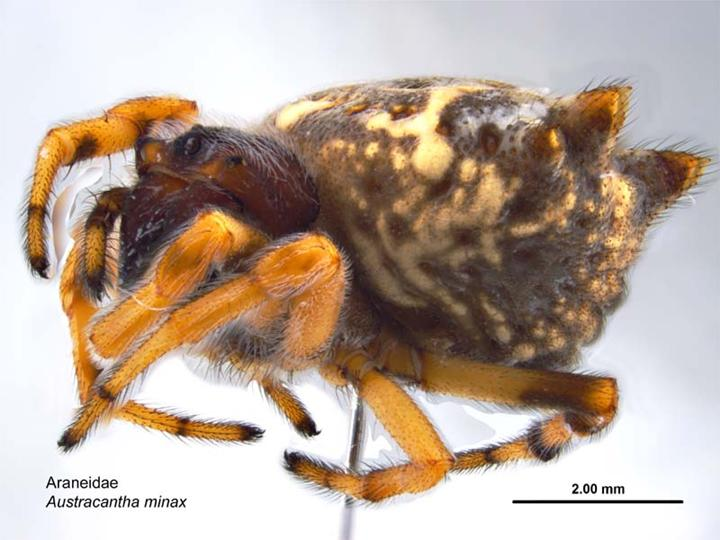
Lateral view (female)

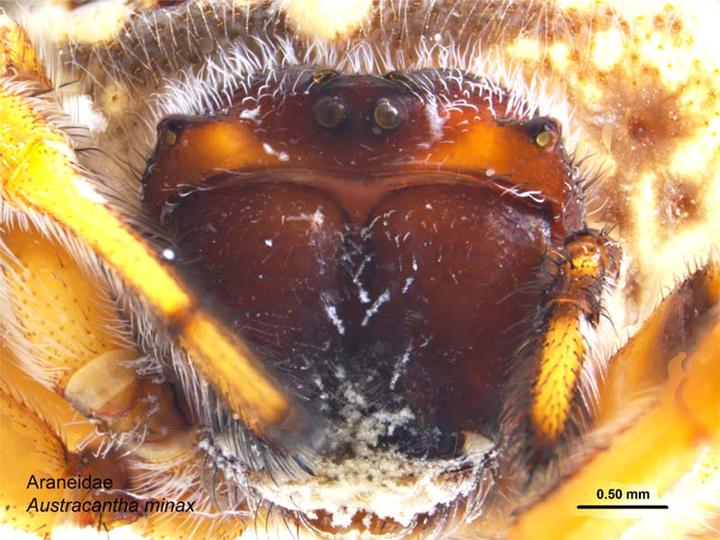
Head of female

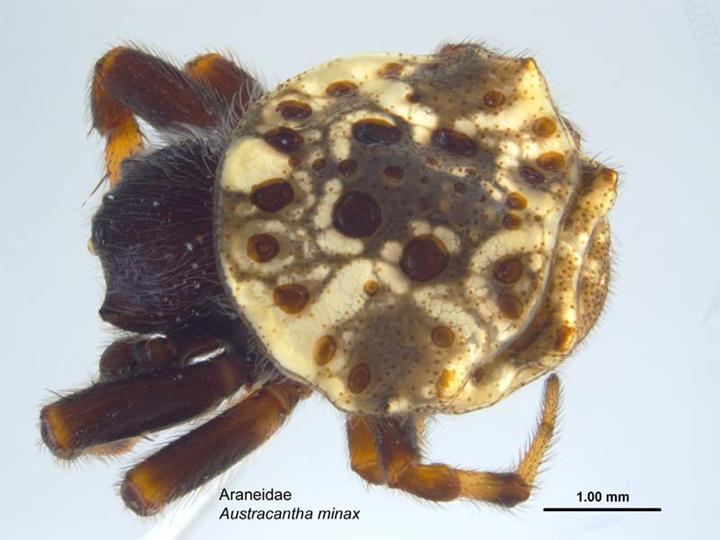
Dorsal view (male)

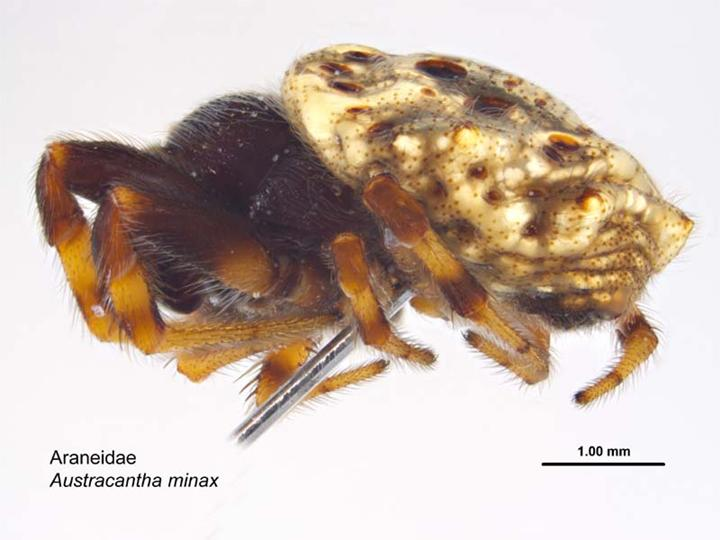
Lateral view (male)

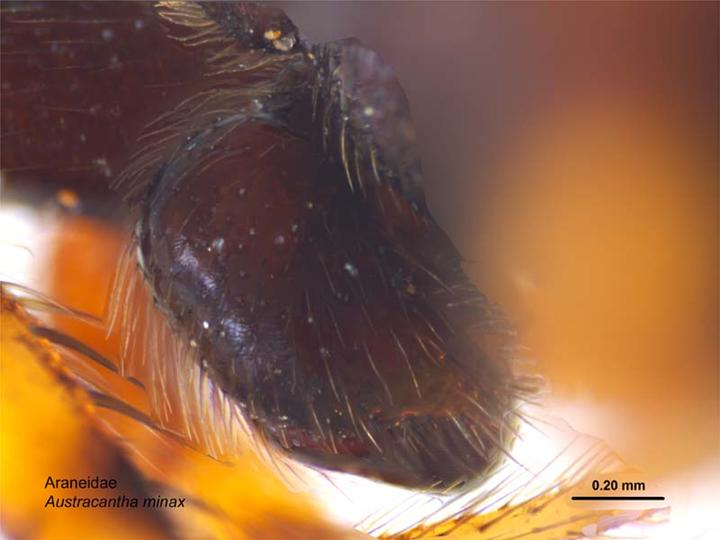
Pedipalps of male

Jewel spiders have a distinctive appearance that makes them relatively easy to identify. The cephalothorax is black in colour with a bluish metallic sheen. It is covered with small white hairs (setae). The carapace (upper part of the cephalothorax) is rectangular in shape. The sternum (chest) is brownish black, with a yellow central area. The chelicerae (fangs) are black with four to six small teeth. The maxillae and other mouthparts are black at the base, lightening to brown and bright yellow at the tips. The pedipalps are dark brown.

Jewel spiders have eight eyes arranged in two rows. The front row is recurved, with the two middle eyes (anterior median eyes) further in front than the two at the sides (anterior lateral eyes). The back row is procurved, with the two middle eyes (posterior median eyes) further in the back than the two at the sides (posterior lateral eyes). The legs in females are predominantly dirty yellow to orange in colour. Black tips are present on the last three segments of the legs (the tibiae, metatarsi, and tarsi). The first pair of legs are longer than the others. In males, the legs are mostly black, with brownish tips.

The opisthosoma (abdomen) is large, slightly wider than it is long, and strongly rounded at the front and back. It is shiny black with bright colourful patterns. These colours can vary, but they are usually white, yellow, or yellow-orange. Its most distinctive feature are the three pairs of large "spines" projecting outwards. The first two pairs on the front are close to each other, forming a V-shape as they point to the sides. They are short and roughly conical. The spines on the rear are longer and point backwards. There are wide spaces between them and the two front pairs. The spines are black or brownish black from above, but has a yellow-orange to rusty red lower surfaces.

Jewel spiders are sexually dimorphic. Females are about twice as large as males, reaching 7 to 12 mm (0.28 to 0.47 in) in total length. Their carapace (upper part of cephalothorax) is squarish, usually around 2.7 to 3 mm (0.11 to 0.12 in) long and 2.5 to 3 mm (0.10 to 0.12 in) wide.

Males are usually only around 3 to 5 mm (0.12 to 0.20 in). The carapace is slightly rectangular, usually around 2.1 mm (0.08 in) long and 1.8 mm (0.07 in) wide They are also less colourful than females; with predominantly dark reddish brown bodies. The spines are blunt and are much shorter than the spines of the females. Like all mature male spiders, they are relatively easy to identify because of their greatly enlarged pedipalps used in sperm transfer during mating.

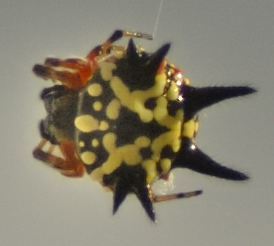
A female yellow morph

Jewel spiders exhibit colour polymorphism. They can be found in white, yellow, or red colour morphs. Jewel spiders found later in autumn (from March to April) are also sometimes melanistic, being entirely dark brown to black in colouration. It is believed that the appearance of these colour morphs are triggered by environmental factors, rather than by genetics. For example, it has been speculated that the purpose of the melanistic colour morphs may be to facilitate better heat absorption during the colder months.

== Distribution ==
Jewel spiders are endemic to Australia. They can be found all throughout the mainland, as well surrounding islands, including Tasmania, Barrow Island (Western Australia), and the Montebello Islands. They are more common on the southern regions of the continent, from southern Queensland and New South Wales, through Victoria and Southern Australia, to Western Australia. Though they can be found in the Northern Territory, they are less common and their place is usually taken by species from the genus Gasteracantha instead.

== Ecology and behaviour ==
=== Web-building and aggregations ===
Jewel spiders are cathemeral, remaining active both day and night. Females build vertically-oriented orb webs about 1 to 2 m (3.3 to 6.6 ft) from the ground and 0.45 to 1 m (1.5 to 3.3 ft) in diameter. They are circular with a very dense spiral pattern woven around twenty to thirty rays attached to support threads. The rays do not meet at the centre, but are connected to a small central ring.

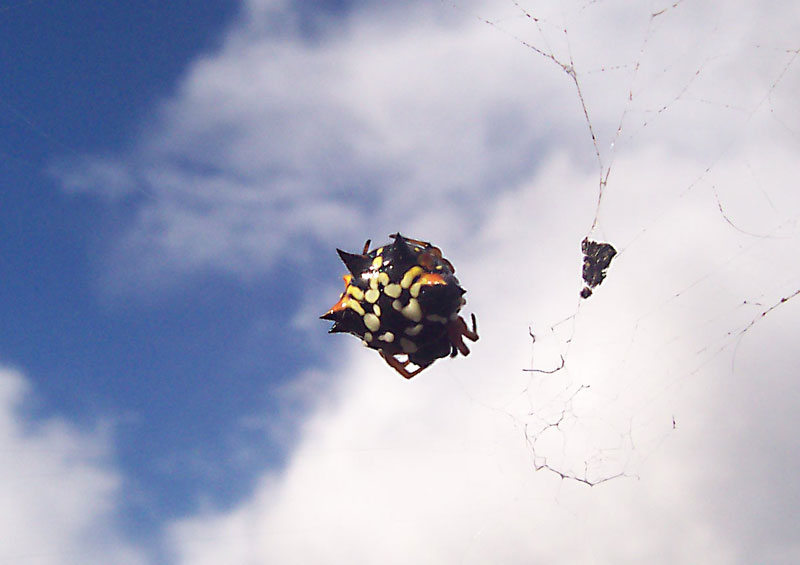
A female on its orb web from the Victorian High Country

Jewel spiders are unusual in that they deliberately make their support threads visible to larger animals. They do this by adding white silk tufts along the support threads at intervals of about 20 mm (0.8 in). It is believed that this is to prevent larger animals from inadvertently walking into the webs and damaging them. Nonetheless, the webs may sometimes be encountered damaged and reduced to only a few threads. The webs are more or less permanent, unlike many other orb weaver spiders which regularly destroy and rebuild their webs every day. Females do not make retreats near their webs. Instead they rest in the centre of the web with their head downwards. Males are usually found on nearby vegetation.

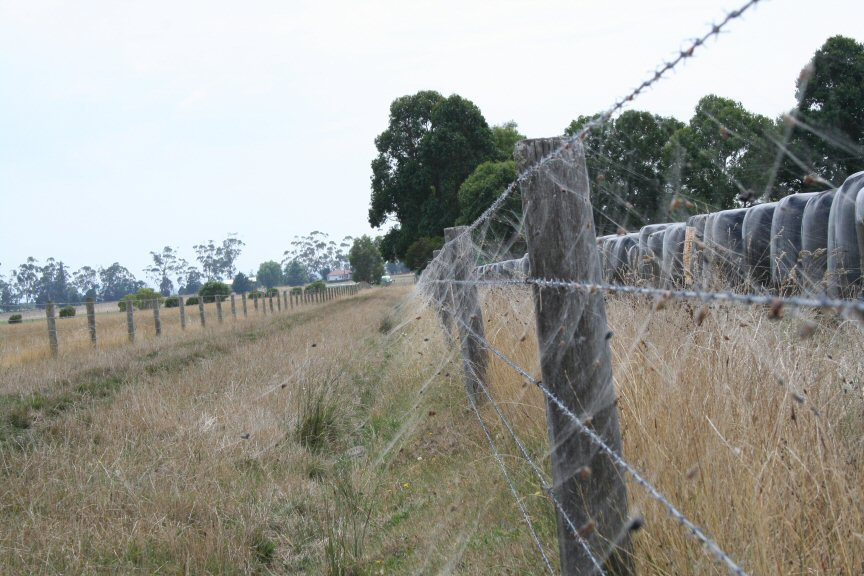
A large aggregation of jewel spider orb webs enshrouding a fenceline in rural Victoria

Jewel spiders are facultatively gregarious. They can often be found living near each other in large overlapping aggregations of orb webs of usually thirty individuals. These can entirely blanket shrubs, tree branches, or man-made structures. A 1997 study observed that aggregations do not seem to increase the amount of prey caught, but it is believed that they still benefit the individual members in other ways. One such advantage is foraging efficiency. By attaching their webs to neighbouring webs, jewel spiders do not need to produce as much silk as they would have when building solitary orb webs. The use of neighbouring webs for support may also allow them to build webs in prey-rich areas they normally can not reach alone (such as the wide gaps between trees). Prey capture may further be enhanced by the creation of a "ricochet effect", wherein prey that escapes one web, may be caught by a neighbouring web.

Aggregations were also observed to attract more males as well as protect the females from predators. However, the egg sacs in communal webs were attacked more often by parasitoids than the egg sacs laid by solitary females.

=== Reproduction and life cycle ===
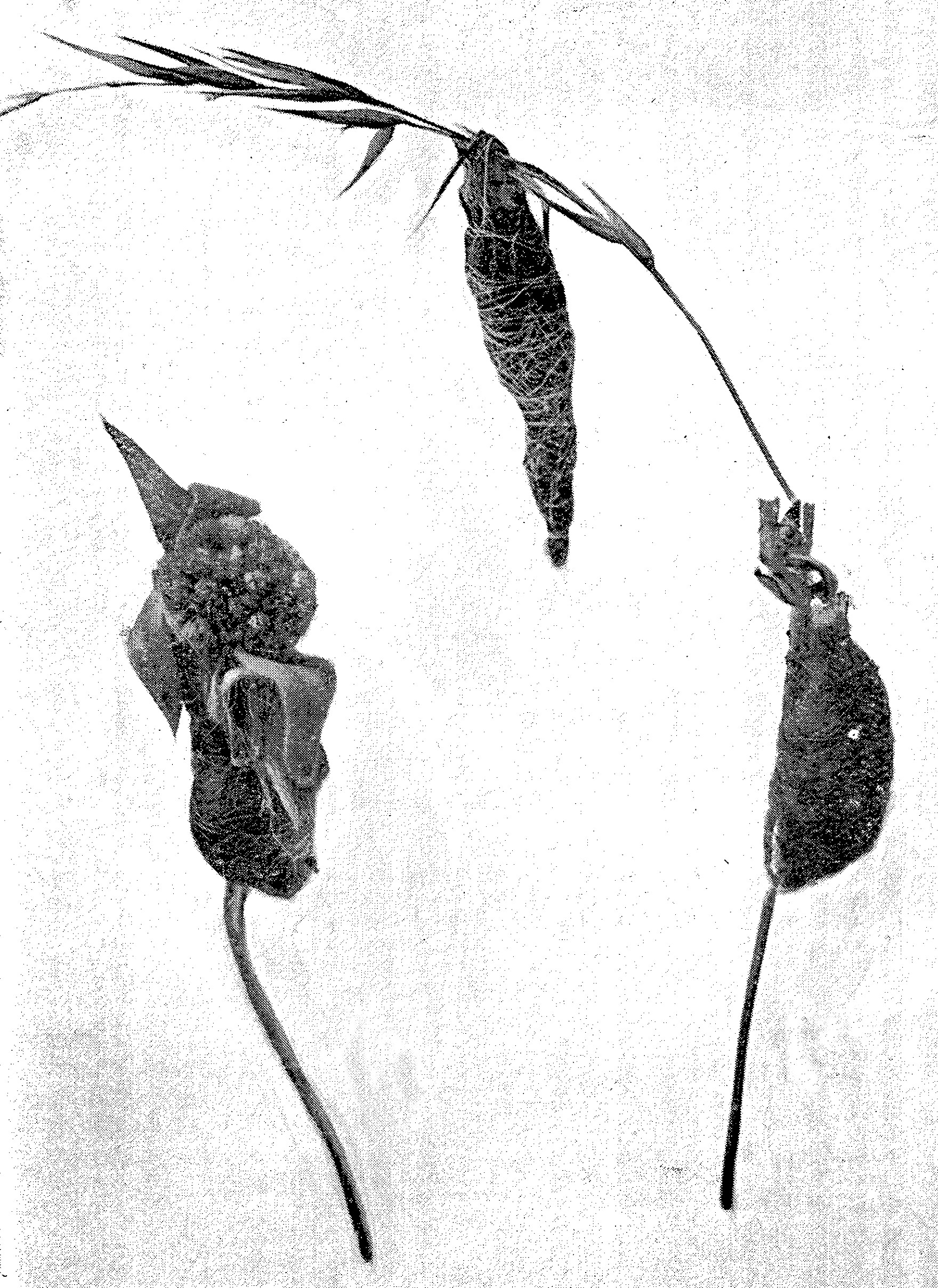
Egg sacs attached to a grass stalk and a flower (Sydney, 1909)

After locating a receptive female, male jewel spiders will begin courtship by first attaching a "mating thread" from nearby plants to the edge of the female's orb web. It then positions itself in the middle of this thread and begins strumming it with their first and second pair of legs. The female will respond by moving towards the source of the vibrations, eventually climbing unto the mating thread itself. Once this happens, the male will wrap its legs around the female tightly and insert its pedipalps into the female's epigyne, transferring its spermatophores (silk packets containing sperm) into the female's spermathecae.

A female jewel spider can mate with multiple males during a single reproductive cycle. If given the chance, the female will still readily mate with other males shortly after a successful mating. To prevent sperm competition, the successful male will defend the female shortly before and after mating. It actively drives away other rival males until the female enters a refractory period and ceases to be receptive to further matings. This usually happens an hour to a day after a successful mating, during which the female will herself aggressively attack and drive away all courting males.

Females usually attach their egg sacs on vegetation and other surfaces near the edges of their webs (including grass blades, leaves, and twigs). They are usually bound longitudinally with loose lengths of silk, but they can sometimes be found dangling. The egg sacs are around 15 to 35 mm (0.59 to 1.38 in) in length and can vary in shape from circular to pointed at both ends. They are reddish brown to golden brown in colour, though rarely they may also be bright yellow. They are made from closely woven silk.

The spiderlings overwinter within the egg sacs until early spring. Females reach sexual maturity at around the middle of January, while males mature earlier in the middle of December.

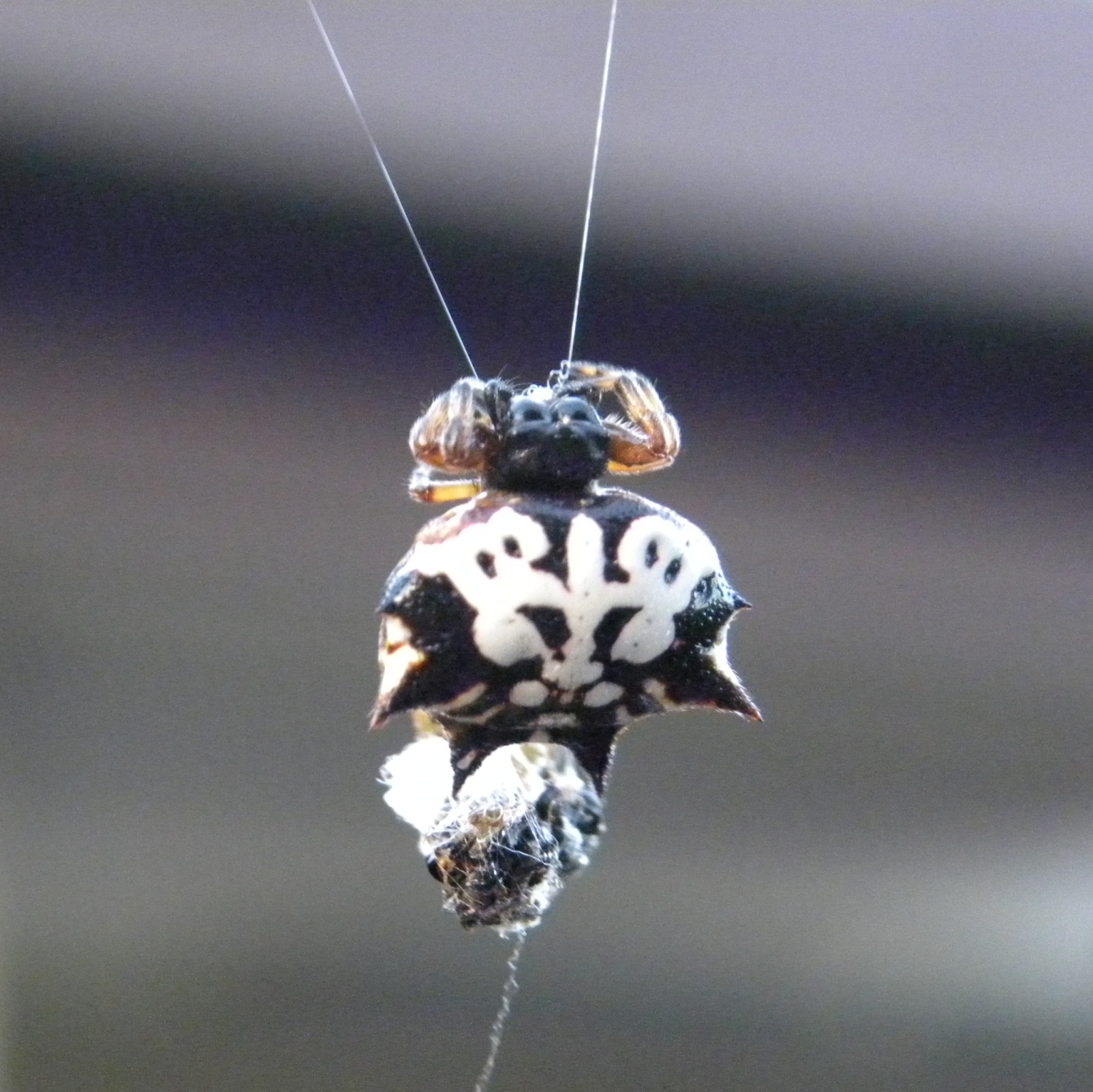
Female with prey wrapped in silk from Central Queensland

=== Diet ===
Jewel spiders are opportunistic predators. They prey on small flying insects like flies and mosquitoes that get entangled on their webs.

== Relationship with humans ==
Jewel spiders are considered harmless, though their web aggregations can be a nuisance to bushwalkers. They are not aggressive and will invariably flee from potential threats. When disturbed, they will try to escape by clambering upside down along their support threads to nearby surfaces (albeit slowly due to their short stubby legs). Failing that, they will drop to the ground.

Like almost all spiders, they possess venom glands which they use to subdue prey, but they rarely bite when handled. Their bites are only mildly painful to humans. Temporary reactions like redness, swelling, or itching can sometimes be experienced on the bite area.

In Perth and the rest of Western Australia, the appearance of jewel spiders in large numbers in gardens (as well as the flowering of Nuytsia floribunda) is often associated with the coming of Christmas.

== See also ==
- Social spiders
- Spiny orb-weavers
- Thelacantha brevispina
