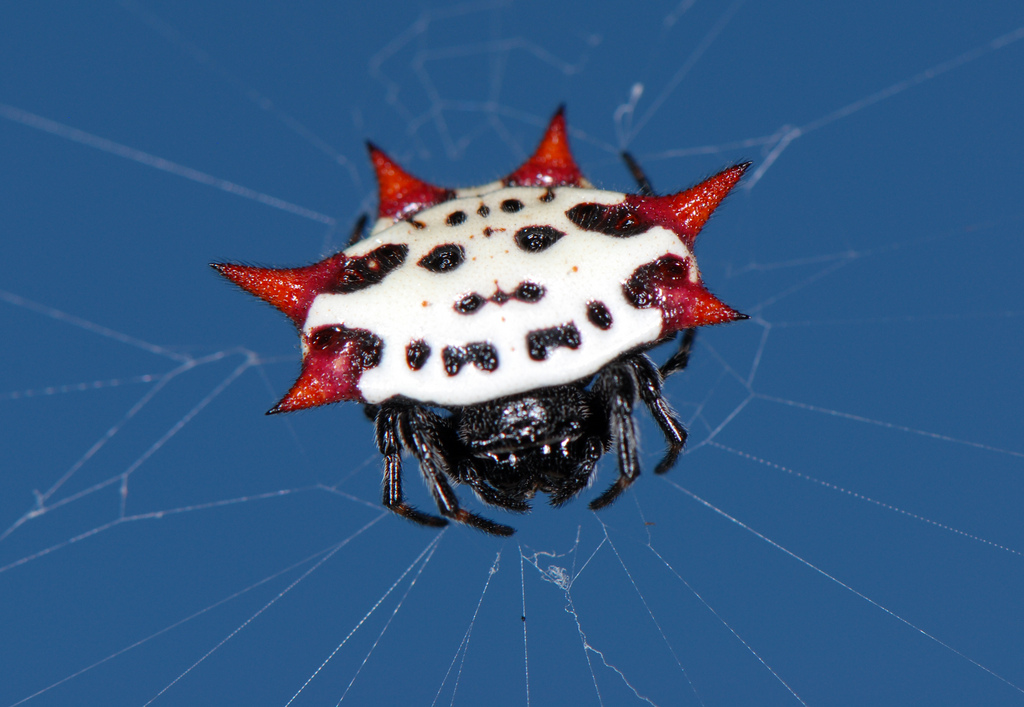
- Female

Scientific classification
- Kingdom: Animalia
- Phylum: Arthropoda
- Subphylum: Chelicerata
- Class: Arachnida
- Order: Araneae
- Infraorder: Araneomorphae
- Family: Araneidae
- Genus: Gasteracantha
- Species: G. cancriformis

Binomial name
- Gasteracantha cancriformis (Linnaeus, 1758)

Synonyms
- Aranea cancriformis Linnaeus, 1758; Aranea conchata Slabber, 1769; Aranea tetracantha Linnaeus, 1767; Dicantha lata (Walckenaer, 1805); Epeira cancer Hentz, 1850; Epeira lata Walckenaer, 1805; Epeira servillei Guérin, 1825; Gasteracantha biolleyi Banks, 1905; Gasteracantha callida O. Pickard-Cambridge, 1879; Gasteracantha canestrinii O. Pickard-Cambridge, 1879; Gasteracantha columbiae Giebel, 1863; Gasteracantha comstocki Mello-Leitão, 1917; Gasteracantha elliptica Gétaz, 1893; Gasteracantha hilaris Thorell, 1859; Gasteracantha insulana Thorell, 1859; Gasteracantha kochii Butler, 1873; Gasteracantha mammosa C. L. Koch, 1844; Gasteracantha mascula Strand, 1916; Gasteracantha maura McCook, 1894; Gasteracantha moesta Thorell, 1859; Gasteracantha oldendorffii Holmberg, 1876; Gasteracantha pallida C. L. Koch, 1844; Gasteracantha picea C. L. Koch, 1844; Gasteracantha preciosa McCook, 1894; Gasteracantha proboscidea Taczanowski, 1879; Gasteracantha quadridens C. L. Koch, 1844; Gasteracantha raimondii Taczanowski, 1879; Gasteracantha rubiginosa C. L. Koch, 1844; Gasteracantha rufospinosa Marx, 1886; Gasteracantha servillei (Guérin, 1825); Gasteracantha tetracantha (Linnaeus, 1767); Gasteracantha velitaris C. L. Koch, 1837; Micrathena triserrata (Walckenaer, 1841); Plectana atlantica Walckenaer, 1841; Plectana cancriformis (Linnaeus, 1758); Plectana elipsoides Walckenear, 1841; Plectana lata (Walckenaer, 1805); Plectana quinqueserrata Walckenaer, 1841; Plectana servillei (Guérin, 1825); Plectana sexserrata Walckenaer, 1841; Plectana triserrata Walckenaer, 1841; Plectana velitaris (C. L. Koch, 1837); Vibradellus carolinus Chamberlin, 1925

= Gasteracantha cancriformis =

Species of spider

Gasteracantha cancriformis (spinybacked orbweaver) is a species of orb-weaver spider (family Araneidae). It is widely distributed in the New World.

The genus name Gasteracantha derives from the Ancient Greek γαστήρ (gastḗr), meaning "belly", and ἄκανθα (ákantha), meaning "thorn", while the specific epithet cancriformis derives from the Latin words cancer ("crab") and forma ("shape, form, appearance").

== Description ==
Females are 5–9 mm (0.20–0.35 in) long and 10–13 mm (0.39–0.51 in) wide. The six abdominal spine-like projections on the abdomen are characteristic. The carapace, legs, and underside are black with white spots under the abdomen. Variations occur in the colour of the upperside of the abdomen - a white or yellow colour with both featuring black spots. A white upper side can have either red or black spines while a yellow upperside can only have black ones. Like with many other spiders, males are much smaller (2 to 3 mm long) and longer than wide. All morphs have six abdominal spines. They are similar to the females in colour, but have a gray abdomen with white spots and the spines are reduced to four or five stubby projections.

This species of spider does not live very long. In fact, the lifespan lasts only until reproduction, which usually takes place in the spring following the winter when they hatched. Females die after producing an egg mass, and males die six days after a complete cycle of sperm induction to the female.

== Distribution and habitat ==
G. cancriformis is native to North America, Central America, the Caribbean and South America. It has been introduced elsewhere, including Hawaii. It prefers living around the edge of woodland and shrubby gardens. Many studies about G. cancriformis are performed in citrus groves in Florida.

G. cancriformis is seen to coexist within and on the edges of the colonies of other colonial orb-weaver spiders, mainly Metepeira incrassata. M. incrassata is known to form large colonies ranging from few hundreds to few thousands of spiders, and their colonies often accommodate other species of orb-weavers including G. cancriformis.

A unique attribute of Gasteracantha members includes their abnormal 19-hour circadian rhythm, making them one of the few complex organisms with a non-nocturnal, non-diurnal wake-sleep cycle.

== Taxonomy ==
G. cancriformis was first described by Carl Linnaeus in 1758 as Aranea cancriformis. The type locality is given only as "America". G. cancriformis has two subspecies, G. c. cancriformis and G. c. gertschi.

== Gallery ==
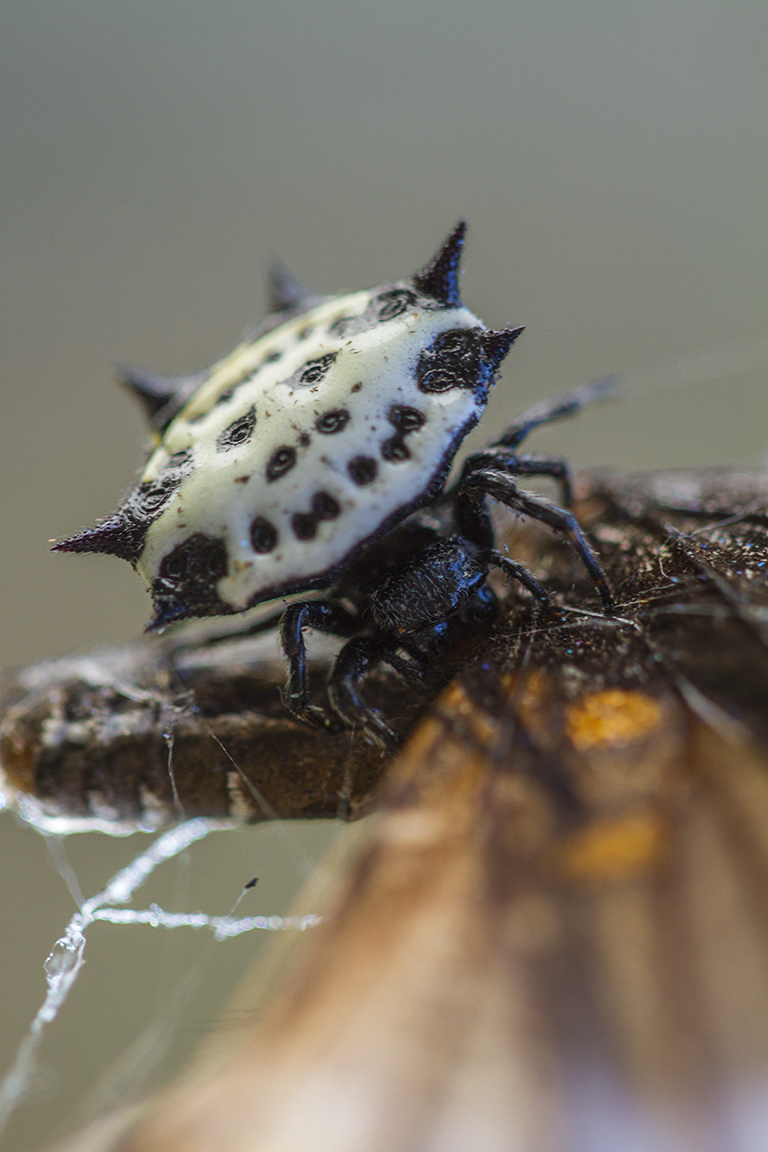
Eating a butterfly

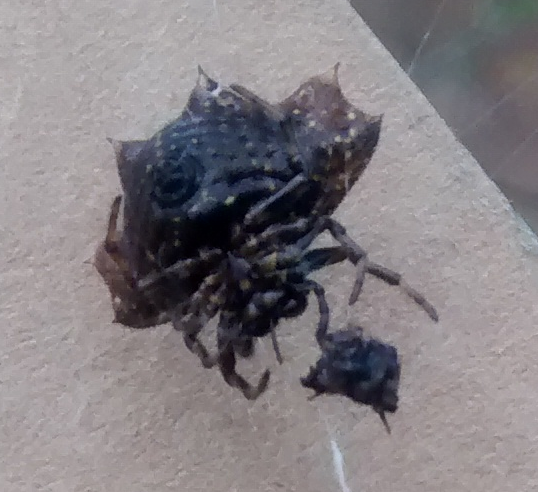
Ventral view, with spinneret visible

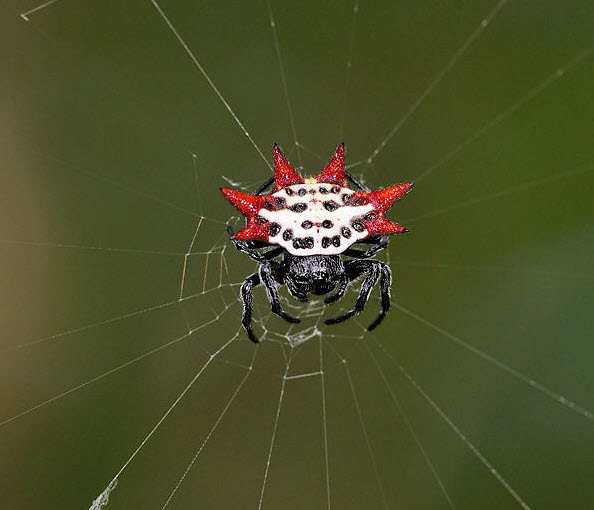
In Miami

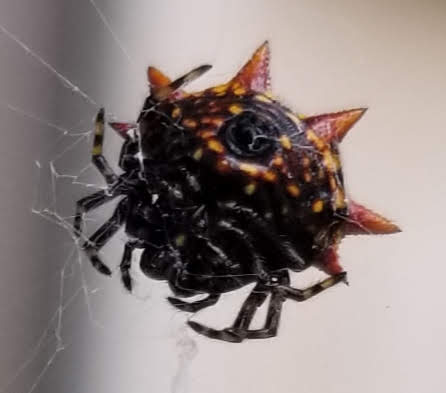
In Miami Lakes

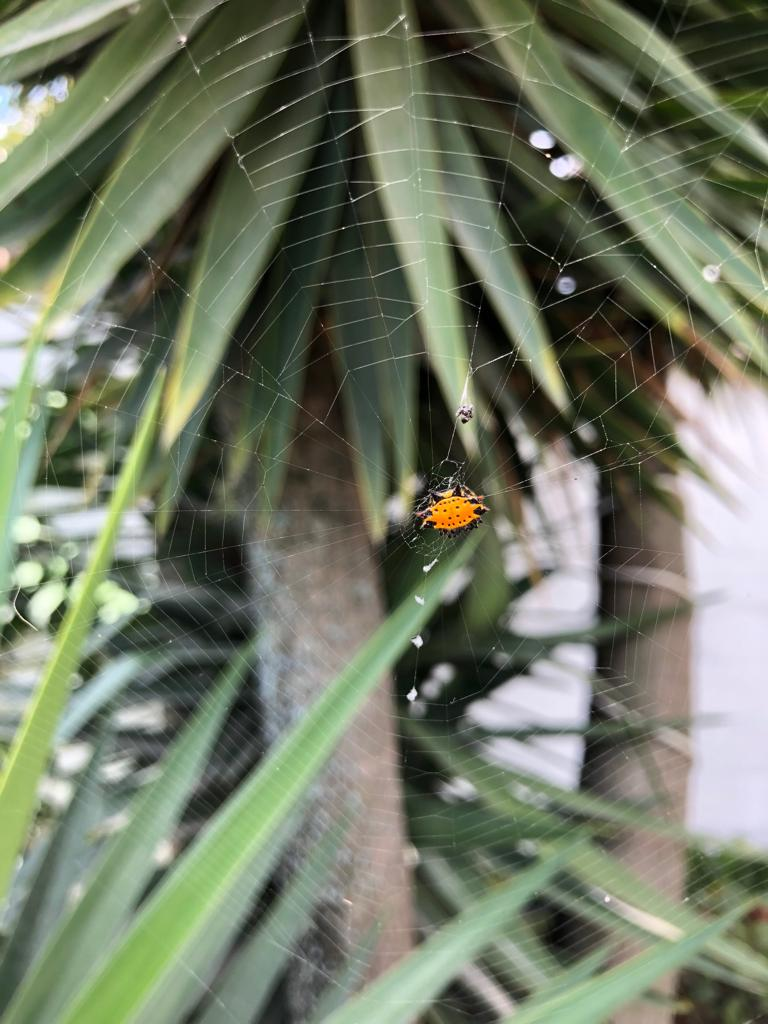
In Ecuador

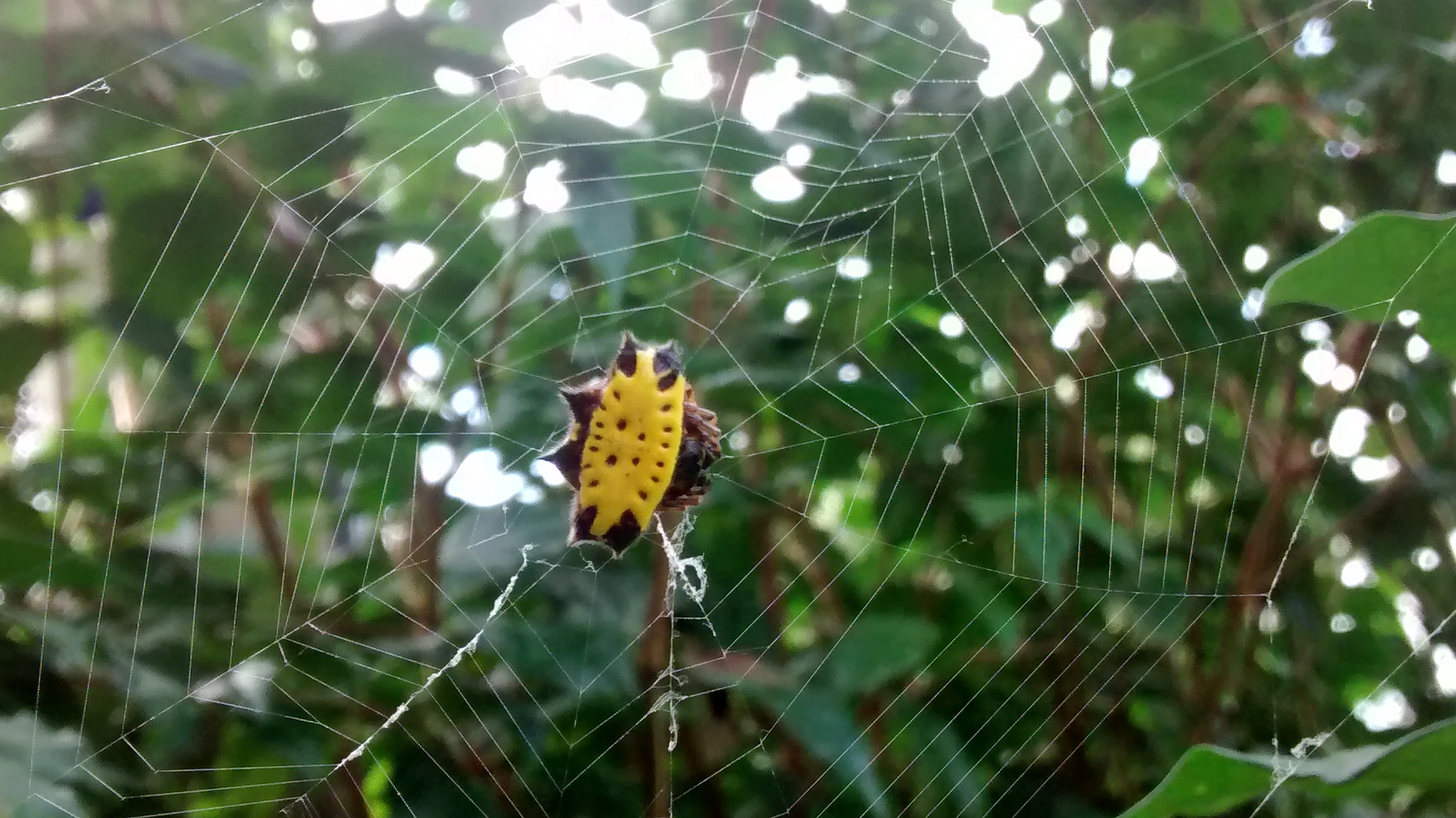
In Novo Hamburgo (southern Brazilian population), with focus on the web

Mating in the Summer

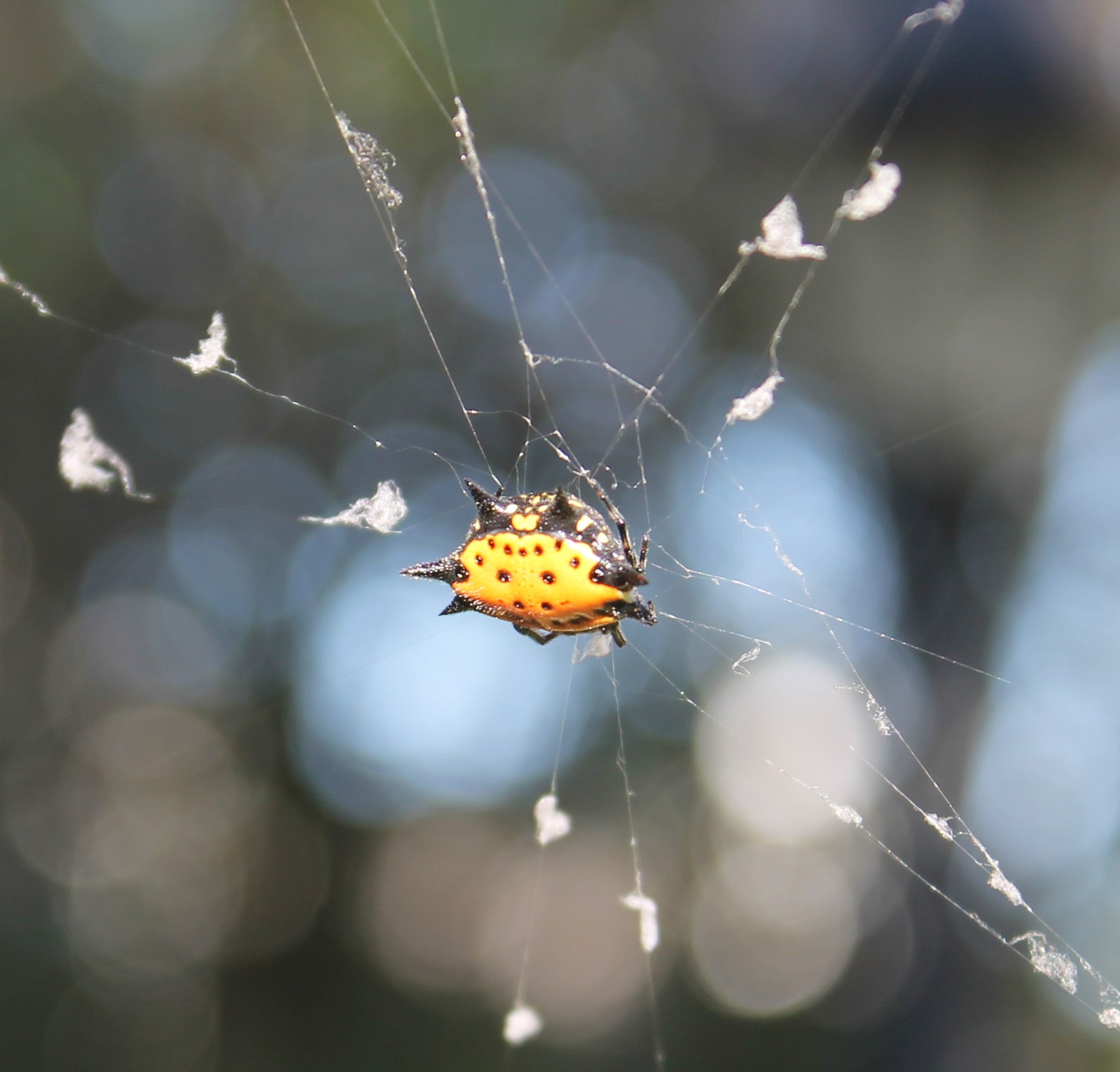
On a tufted web in Houston, Texas

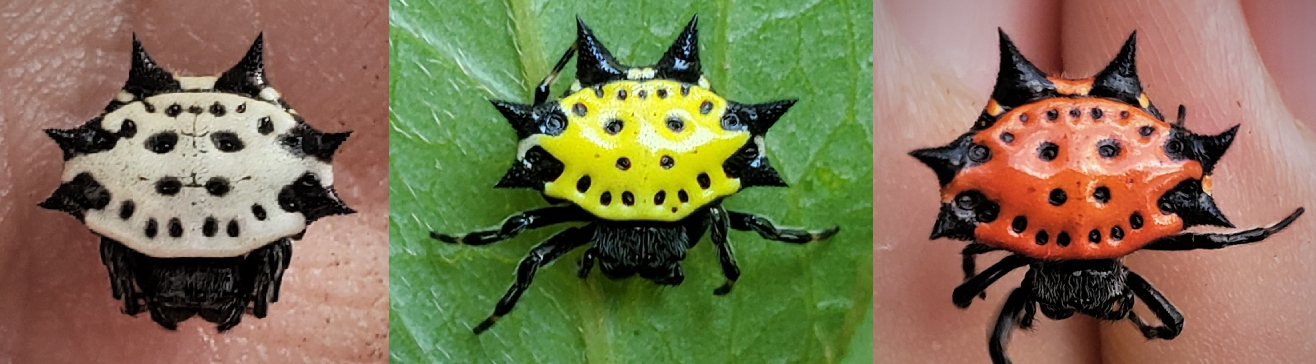
Color variation, near Houston

Underside of orange specimen, showing spinner and thread. For scale, band in background is 6 mm wide. Near Houston

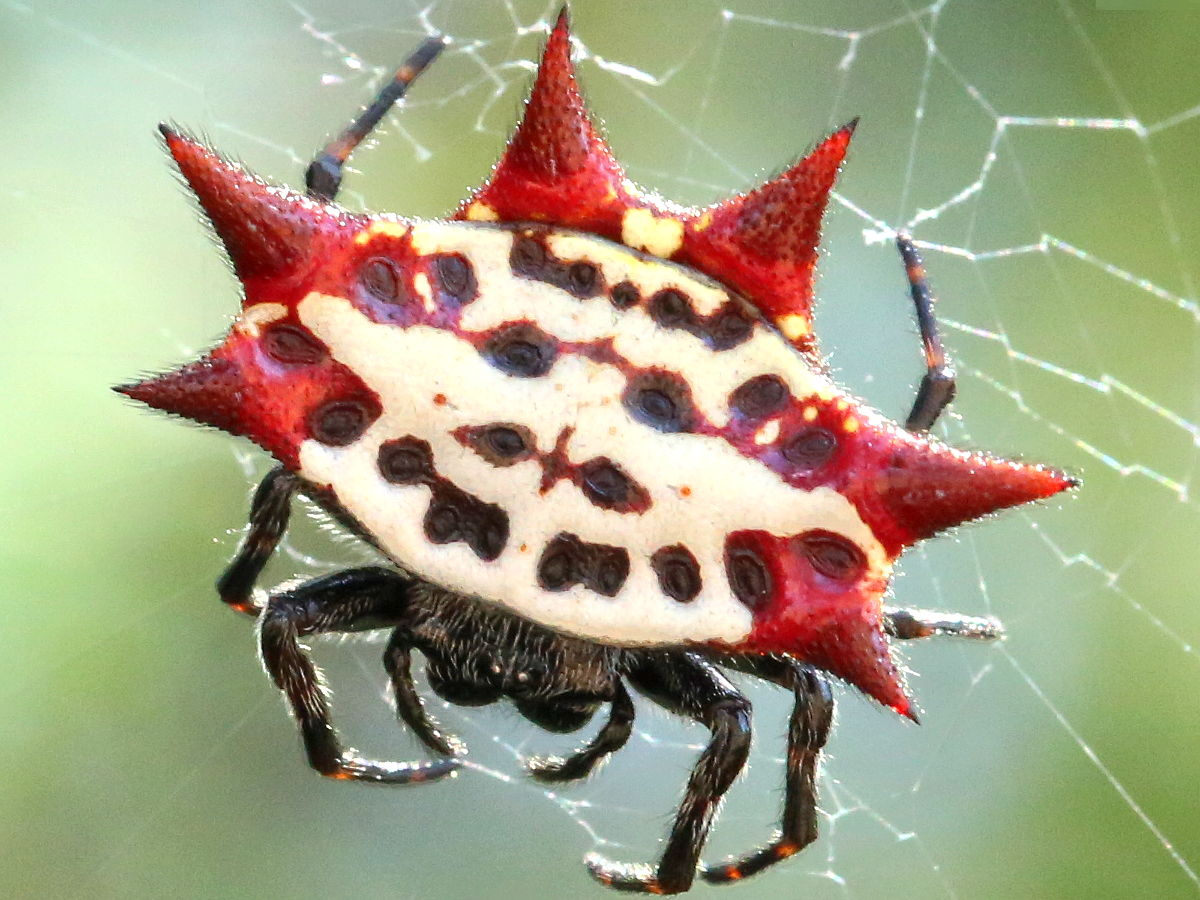
In Molokai, Hawaii

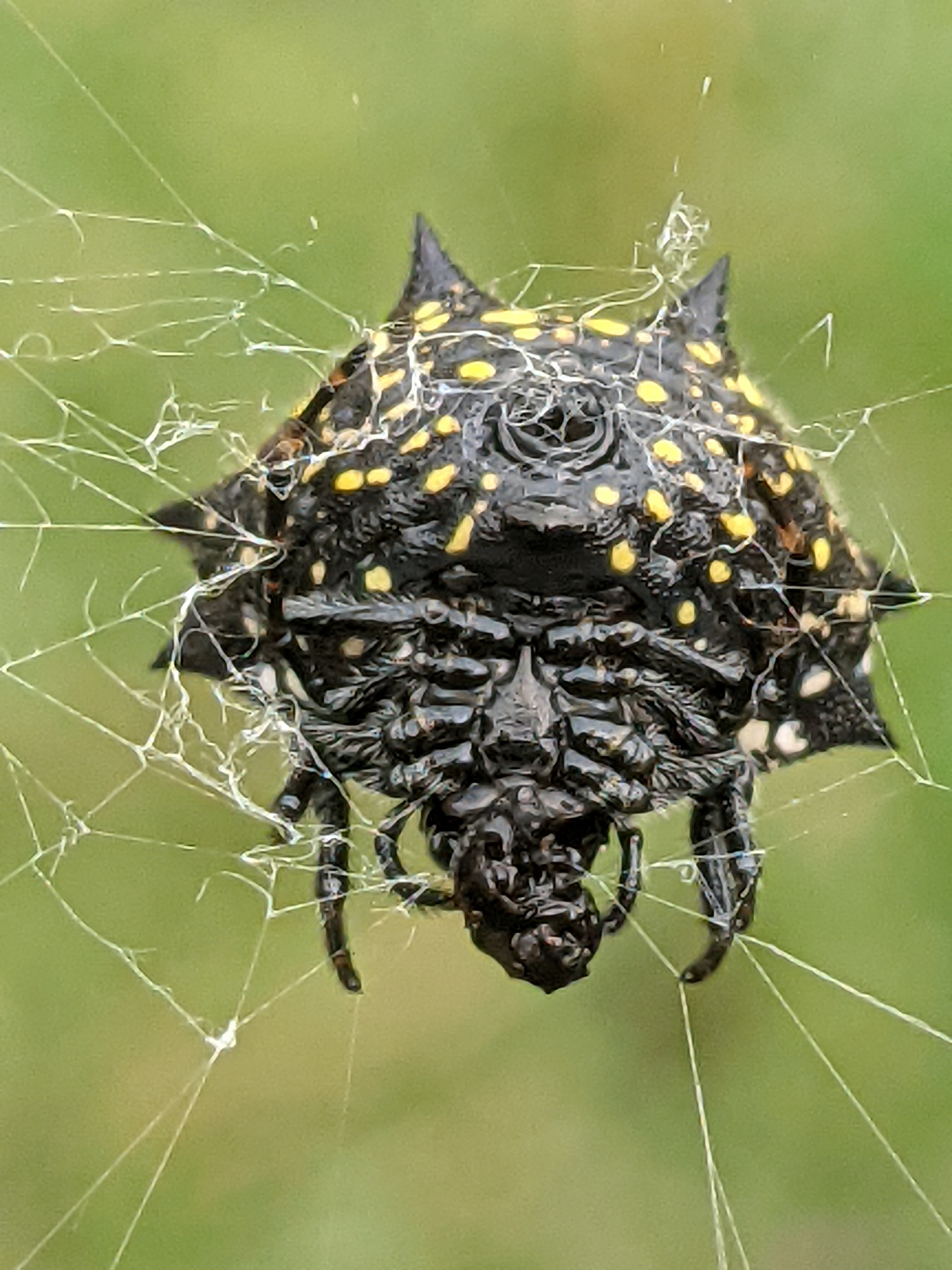
Ventral view, in North Carolina

== See also ==
- Thelacantha brevispina
- Austracantha minax
