= Toxicodynamics =

Study of interactions between the toxicant and a biological target

Toxicodynamics, termed pharmacodynamics in pharmacology, describes the dynamic interactions of a toxicant with a biological target and its biological effects. A biological target, also known as the site of action, can be binding proteins, ion channels, DNA, or a variety of other receptors. When a toxicant enters an organism, it can interact with these receptors and produce structural or functional alterations. The mechanism of action of the toxicant, as determined by a toxicant’s chemical properties, will determine what receptors are targeted and the overall toxic effect at the cellular level and organismal level.

Toxicants have been grouped together according to their chemical properties by way of quantitative structure-activity relationships (QSARs), which allows prediction of toxic action based on these properties. endocrine disrupting chemicals (EDCs) and carcinogens are examples of classes of toxicants that can act as QSARs. EDCs mimic or block transcriptional activation normally caused by natural steroid hormones. These types of chemicals can act on androgen receptors, estrogen receptors and thyroid hormone receptors. This mechanism can include such toxicants as dichlorodiphenyltrichloroethane (DDE) and polychlorinated biphenyls (PCBs). Another class of chemicals, carcinogens, are substances that cause cancer and can be classified as genotoxic or nongenotoxic carcinogens. These categories include toxicants such as polycyclic aromatic hydrocarbon (PAHs) and carbon tetrachloride (CCl_{4}).

The process of toxicodynamics can be useful for application in environmental risk assessment by implementing toxicokinetic-toxicodynamic (TKTD) models. TKTD models include phenomena such as time-varying exposure, carry-over toxicity, organism recovery time, effects of mixtures, and extrapolation to untested chemicals and species. Due to their advantages, these types of models may be more applicable for risk assessment than traditional modeling approaches.

== Overview ==
A box model explaining the processes of toxicokinetics and toxicodynamics.

While toxicokinetics describes the changes in the concentrations of a toxicant over time due to the uptake, biotransformation, distribution and elimination of toxicants, toxicodynamics involves the interactions of a toxicant with a biological target and the functional or structural alterations in a cell that can eventually lead to a toxic effect. Depending on the toxicant’s chemical reactivity and vicinity, the toxicant may be able to interact with the biological target. Interactions between a toxicant and the biological target may also be more specific, where high-affinity binding sites increase the selectivity of interactions. For this reason, toxicity may be expressed primarily in certain tissues or organs. The targets are often receptors on the cell surface or in the cytoplasm and nucleus. Toxicants can either induce an unnecessary response or inhibit a natural response, which can cause damage. If the biological target is critical and the damage is severe enough, irreversible injury can occur first at the molecular level, which will translate into effects at higher levels of organization.

== Endocrine disruptors ==
EDCs are generally considered to be toxicants that either mimic or block the transcriptional activation normally caused by natural steroid hormones. These chemicals include those acting on androgen receptors, estrogen receptors and thyroid hormone receptors.

=== Effects of endocrine disruptors ===
Endocrine disrupting chemicals can interfere with the endocrine system in a number of ways including hormone synthesis, storage/release, transport and clearance, receptor recognition and binding, and postreceptor activation.

In wildlife, exposure to EDCs can result in altered fertility, reduced viability of offspring, impaired hormone secretion or activity and modified reproductive anatomy. The reproductive anatomy of offspring can particularly be affected if maternal exposure occurs. In females, this includes mammary glands, fallopian tubes, uterus, cervix, and vagina. In males, this includes the prostate, seminal vesicles, epididymitis and testes. Exposure of fish to EDCs has also been associated with abnormal thyroid function, decreased fertility, decreased hatching success, de-feminization and masculinization of female fish and alteration of immune function.

Endocrine disruption as a mode of action for xenobiotics was brought into awareness by Our Stolen Future by Theo Colborn. Endocrine disrupting chemicals are known to accumulate in body tissue and are highly persistent in the environment. Many toxicants are known EDCs including pesticides, phthalates, phytoestrogens, some industrial/commercial products, and pharmaceuticals. These chemicals are known to cause endocrine disruption via a few different mechanisms. While the mechanism associated with the thyroid hormone receptor is not well understood, two more established mechanisms involve the inhibition of the androgen receptor and activation of the estrogen receptor.

=== Androgen-receptor mediated ===
Certain toxicants act as endocrine disruptors by interacting with the androgen receptor. DDE is one example of a chemical that acts via this mechanism. DDE is a metabolite of DDT that is widespread in the environment. Although production of DDT has been banned in the Western world, this chemical is extremely persistent and is still commonly found in the environment along with its metabolite DDE. DDE is an antiandrogen, which means it alters the expression of specific androgen-regulated genes, and is an androgen receptor (AR)-mediated mechanism. DDE is a lipophilic compound which diffuses into the cell and binds to the AR. Through binding, the receptor is inactivated and cannot bind to the androgen response element on DNA. This inhibits the transcription of androgen-responsive genes which can have serious consequences for exposed wildlife. In 1980, there was a spill in Lake Apopka, Florida which released the pesticide dicofol and DDT along with its metabolites. The neonatal and juvenile alligators present in this lake have been extensively studied and observed to have altered plasma hormone concentrations, decreased clutch viability, increased juvenile mortality, and morphological abnormalities in the testis and ovary.

=== Estrogen-receptor mediated ===
Toxicants may also cause endocrine disruption through interacting with the estrogen receptor. This mechanism has been well-studied with PCBs. These chemicals have been used as coolants and lubricants in transformers and other electrical equipment due to their insulating properties. A purely anthropogenic substance, PCBs are no longer in production in the United States due to the adverse health effects associated with exposure, but they are highly persistent and are still widespread in the environment. PCBs are a xenoestrogen, which elicit an enhancing (rather than inhibiting) response, and are mediated by the estrogen receptor. These are often referred to as estrogen mimics because they mimic the effects of estrogen. PCBs often build up in sediments and bioaccumulate in organisms. These chemicals diffuse into the nucleus and bind to the estrogen receptor. The estrogen receptor is kept in an inactive conformation through interactions with proteins such as heat shock proteins 59, 70, and 90. After the toxicant binding occurs, the estrogen receptor is activated and forms a homodimer complex which seeks out estrogen response elements in the DNA. The binding of the complex to these elements causes a rearrangement of the chromatin and transcription of the gene, resulting in production of a specific protein. In doing this, PCBs elicit an estrogenic response which can affect numerous functions within the organism. These effects are observed in various aquatic species. The levels of PCBs in marine mammals are often very high as a result of bioaccumulation. Studies have demonstrated that PCBs are responsible for reproductive impairment in the harbor seal (Phoca vitulina). Similar effects have been found in the grey seal (Halichoerus grypus), the ringed seal (Pusa hispida) and the California sea lion (Zalophys californianus). In the grey seals and ringed seals, uterine occlusions and stenosis were found which led to sterility. If exposed to a xenoestrogen such as PCBs, male fish have also been seen to produce vitellogenin. Vitellogenin is an egg protein female fish normally produce but is not usually present in males except at very low concentrations. This is often used as a biomarker for EDCs.

== Carcinogens ==
Carcinogens are defined as any substance that causes cancer. The toxicodynamics of carcinogens can be complex due to the varying mechanisms of action for different carcinogenic toxicants. Because of their complex nature, carcinogens are classified as either genotoxic or nongenotoxic carcinogens.

=== Effects of carcinogens ===
The effects of carcinogens are most often related to human exposures but mammals are not the only species that can be affected by cancer-causing toxicants. Many studies have shown that cancer can develop in fish species as well. Neoplasms occurring in epithelial tissue such as the liver, gastrointestinal tract, and the pancreas have been linked to various environmental toxicants. Carcinogens preferentially target the liver in fish and develop hepatocellular and biliary lesions.

=== Genotoxic carcinogens ===
Genotoxic carcinogens interact directly with DNA and genetic material or indirectly by their reactive metabolites. Toxicants such as PAHs can be genotoxic carcinogens to aquatic organisms. PAHs are widely spread throughout the environment through the incomplete burning of coal, wood, or petroleum products. Although PAHs do not bioaccumulate in vertebrate tissue, many studies have confirmed that certain PAH compounds such as benzo(a)pyrene, benz(a)anthracene, and Benzofluoranthene, are bioavailable and responsible for liver diseases like cancer in wild fish populations. One mechanism of action for genotoxic carcinogens includes the formation of DNA adducts. Once the PAH compound enters an organism, it becomes metabolized and available for biotransformation.

The biotransformation process can activate the PAH compound and transform it into a diol epoxide, which is a very reactive intermediate. These diol-epoxides covalently bind with DNA base pairs, most often with guanine and adenine to form stable adducts within the DNA structure. The binding of diol epoxides and DNA base pairs blocks polymerase replication activity. This blockage ultimately contributes to an increase in DNA damage by reducing repair activity.

Due to these processes, PAH compounds are thought to play a role in the initiation and early promotion stage of carcinogenesis. Fish exposed to PAHs develop a range of liver lesions, some of which are characteristic of hepatocarcinogenicity.

=== Nongenotoxic carcinogens ===
Nongenotoxic, or epigenetic carcinogens are different and slightly more ambiguous than genotoxic carcinogens since they are not directly carcinogenic. Nongenotoxic carcinogens act by secondary mechanisms that do not directly damage genes. This type of carcinogenesis does not change the sequence of DNA; instead it alters the expression or repression of certain genes by a wide variety of cellular processes. Since these toxicants do not directly act on DNA, little is known about the mechanistic pathway. It has been proposed that modification of gene expression from nongenotoxic carcinogens can occur by oxidative stress, peroxisome proliferation, suppression of apoptosis, alteration of intercellular communication, and modulation of metabolizing enzymes.

Carbon tetrachloride is an example of a probable nongenotoxic carcinogen to aquatic vertebrates. Historically, carbon tetrachloride has been used in pharmaceutical production, petroleum refining, and as an industrial solvent. Due to its widespread industrial use and release into the environment, carbon tetrachloride has been found in drinking water and therefore, has become a concern for aquatic organisms. Because of its high hepatotoxic properties, carbon tetrachloride could potentially be linked to liver cancer. Experimental cancer studies have shown that carbon tetrachloride may cause benign and malignant liver tumors to rainbow trout. carbon tetrachloride works as a nongenotoxic carcinogen by formulating free radicals which induce oxidative stress. It has been proposed that once carbon tetrachloride enters the organism, it is metabolized to trichloromethyl and trichloromethyl peroxy radicals by the CYP2E1 enzyme. The more reactive radical, trichloromethyl peroxy, can attack polyunsaturated fatty acids in the cellular membrane to form fatty acid free radicals and initiate lipid peroxidation. The attack on the cellular membrane increases its permeability, causing a leakage of enzymes and disrupts cellular calcium homeostasis. This loss of calcium homeostasis activates calcium dependent degradative enzymes and cytotoxicity, causing hepatic damage. The regenerative and proliferative changes that occur in the liver during this time could increase the frequency of genetic damage, resulting in a possible increase of cancer.

== Applications ==
Toxicodynamics can be used in combination with toxicokinetics in environmental risk assessment to determine the potential effects of releasing a toxicant into the environment. The most widely used method of incorporating this are TKTD models.

=== Setup of TKTD models ===
Both toxicokinetics and toxicodynamics have now been described, and using these definitions models were formed, where the internal concentration (TK) and damage (TD) are simulated in response to exposure. TK and TD are separated in the model to allow for the identification of properties of toxicants that determine TK and those that determine TD. To use this type of model, parameter values for TK processes need to be obtained first. Second, the TD parameters need to be estimated. Both of these steps require a large database of toxicity information for parametrization. After establishing all the parameter values for the TKTD model, and using basic scientific precautions, the model can be used to predict toxic effects, calculate recovery times for organisms, or establish extrapolations from the model to toxicity of untested toxicants and species.

=== History of TKTD models ===
It has been argued that the current challenges facing risk assessments can be addressed with TKTD modeling. TKTD models were derived in response to a couple of factors. One is the lack of time being considered as a factor in toxicity and risk assessment. Some of the earliest developed TKTD models, such as the Critical Body Residue (CBR) model and Critical Target Occupation (CTO) model, have considered time as a factor but a criticism has been that they are for very specific circumstances such as reversibly acting toxicants or irreversibly acting toxicants. Further extrapolation of the CTO and CBR models are DEBtox, which can model sublethal endpoints, and hazard versions of the CTO, which takes into account stochastic death as opposed to individual tolerance. Another significant step to developing TKTD models was the incorporation of a state variable for damage. By using damage as a toxicodynamic state-variable, modeling intermediate recovery rates can be accomplished for toxicants that act reversibly with their targets, without the assumptions of instant recovery (CBR model) or irreversible interactions (CTO model). TKTD models that incorporate damage are the Damage Assessment Model (DAM) and the Threshold Damage Model (TDM). For what may seem like straightforward endpoints, a variety of different TKTD approaches exist. A review of the assumptions and hypotheses of each was previously published in the creation of a general unified threshold model of survival (GUTS).

=== Advantages for risk assessment ===
As referenced above, TKTD models have several advantages to traditional models for risk assessments. The principal advantages to using TKTD models are:

- The consequences of time-varying or repeated exposures can be explained and simulated by the TKTD model.
- Carry-over toxicity as well as delayed effects can be simulated, whether the carry-over toxicity is due to TK or TD or both. In this way, TKTD models can quantify risks from pulsed or fluctuating exposures.
- Organism recovery time depends on the time course of TK and TD, which makes the TKTD models suitable for calculating organism recovery time.
- TKTD models have the potential to predict effects of mixtures, including both environmental and chemical stressors and also be used as mechanism-based extrapolation to untested toxicants or untested species.
- Linking TKTD models with Individual Based Models (IBM) may improve risk assessment of toxicants by simulating temporal aspects as well as ecological aspects.

Due to its advantages, TKTD models may be more powerful than the traditional dose-response models because of their incorporation of chemical concentrations as well as temporal dimensions. Toxicodynamic modeling (such as TKTD models) has been shown to be a useful tool for toxicological research, with increasing opportunities to use these results in risk assessment to permit a more scientifically based risk assessment that is less reliable on animal testing. Overall, these types of models can formalize knowledge about the toxicity of toxicants and organism sensitivity, create new hypotheses, and simulate temporal aspects of toxicity, making them useful tools for risk assessment.

== See also ==
- Ecotoxicology
