= Synthesizing unit =

Synthesizing units (SUs) are generalized enzymes that follow the rules of classic enzyme kinetics with two modifications:

- product formation is not taken to be a function of substrate concentrations but of substrate fluxes that arrive at the SUs
- the dissociation rate of the substrate-SU complex to (unchanged) substrate and (unbounded) SU is assumed to be small.

== One substrate One synthesizing unit ==
$S + \theta_. \rightleftharpoons \theta_S \rightleftharpoons P + \theta_.$

where S is the substrate, $\theta$ is the synthesizing unit (SU), and P is the product. There are two stages:

1. Binding stage: $S + \theta_. \rightleftharpoons \theta_S$
2. Processing stage: $\theta_S \rightleftharpoons P + \theta_.$

To describe the changes in SU:

$$\begin{cases} \frac{d\theta_.}{dt} = -bS\theta_. + k\theta_S \\ \frac{d\theta_S}{dt} = bS\theta_. - k\theta_S \\ \theta_. + \theta_S = 1 \end{cases}$$

Where b is binding rate, and k is processing rate. Since the dissociation rate of the substrate-SU complex to (unchanged) substrate and (unbounded) SU is assumed to be small, $\frac{d\theta_.}{dt}$ and $\frac{d\theta_S}{dt}$ are assumed to be zero.

This system of equation suggests the free SU percentage is $\theta_. = \frac{k}{bS + k}$ and the product of flux is $J_p = \frac{kS}{S + S/b}$

== Modifications of classic theory ==
=== Extension ===
The first modification is an extension of the classic theory; if arrival fluxes are taken proportional to substrate concentrations, the classic theory results. This extension allows application in spatially heterogeneous environments (such as in living cells), and to treat photons and molecules in the same framework (important in photosynthesis).

=== Simplification ===
The second modification allows a substantial simplification of the classic theory, and so application in complex metabolic networks. The theory on synthesizing units is used in dynamic energy budget theory, where 4 basic modes are distinguished:

- the substrates can be substitutable or supplementary (= complementary); if the transformations A -> C and B -> C can occur, substrates A and B are said to be substitutable with respect to their transformation to C, if both are required to produce C they are said to be supplementary
- the processing of these substrates by SUs can be sequential or parallel; if in the transformation A + B -> C the binding of substrate A to the SU does not affect that of B, these substrates are processed simultaneously, if not these substrates are processed sequentially

Mixtures of the 4 basic modes can occur, especially if the substrates represent generalized compounds, rather than pure chemical compounds. A generalized compound is a mixture of chemical compounds that does not change in composition.

== Sources ==
- Kooijman SA (July 1998). "The Synthesizing Unit as model for the stoichiometric fusion and branching of metabolic fluxes". Biophys. Chem. 73 (1–2): 179–88. doi:10.1016/S0301-4622(98)00162-8. PMID 17029722.
- Kooijman, S.A.L.M; Segel, L.A. (2005). "How growth affects the fate of cellular metabolites" (PDF). Bulletin of Mathematical Biology. 67 (1): 57–77. doi:10.1016/j.bulm.2004.06.003. PMID 15691539. S2CID 8570975.
