= Shape correction function =

The shape correction function is a ratio of the surface area of a growing organism and that of an isomorph as function of the volume. The shape of the isomorph is taken to be equal to that of the organism for a given reference volume, so for that particular volume the surface areas are also equal and the shape correction function has value one.

For a volume $V$ and reference volume $V_d$, the shape correction function $M(V)$ equals:

- V0-morphs: $M(V) = (V/V_d)^{-2/3}$
- V1-morphs: $M(V) = (V/V_d)^{1/3}$
- Isomorphs: $M(V) = (V/V_d)^0 = 1$

Static mixtures between a V0 and a V1-morph can be found as: $M(V) = w(V/V_d)^{-2/3} + (1-w)(V/V_d)^{1/3}$ for $0<w<1$

The shape correction function is used in Dynamic Energy Budget theory to correct equations for isomorphs to organisms that change shape during growth. The conversion is necessary for accurately modelling food (substrate) acquisition and mobilization of reserve for use by metabolism.
