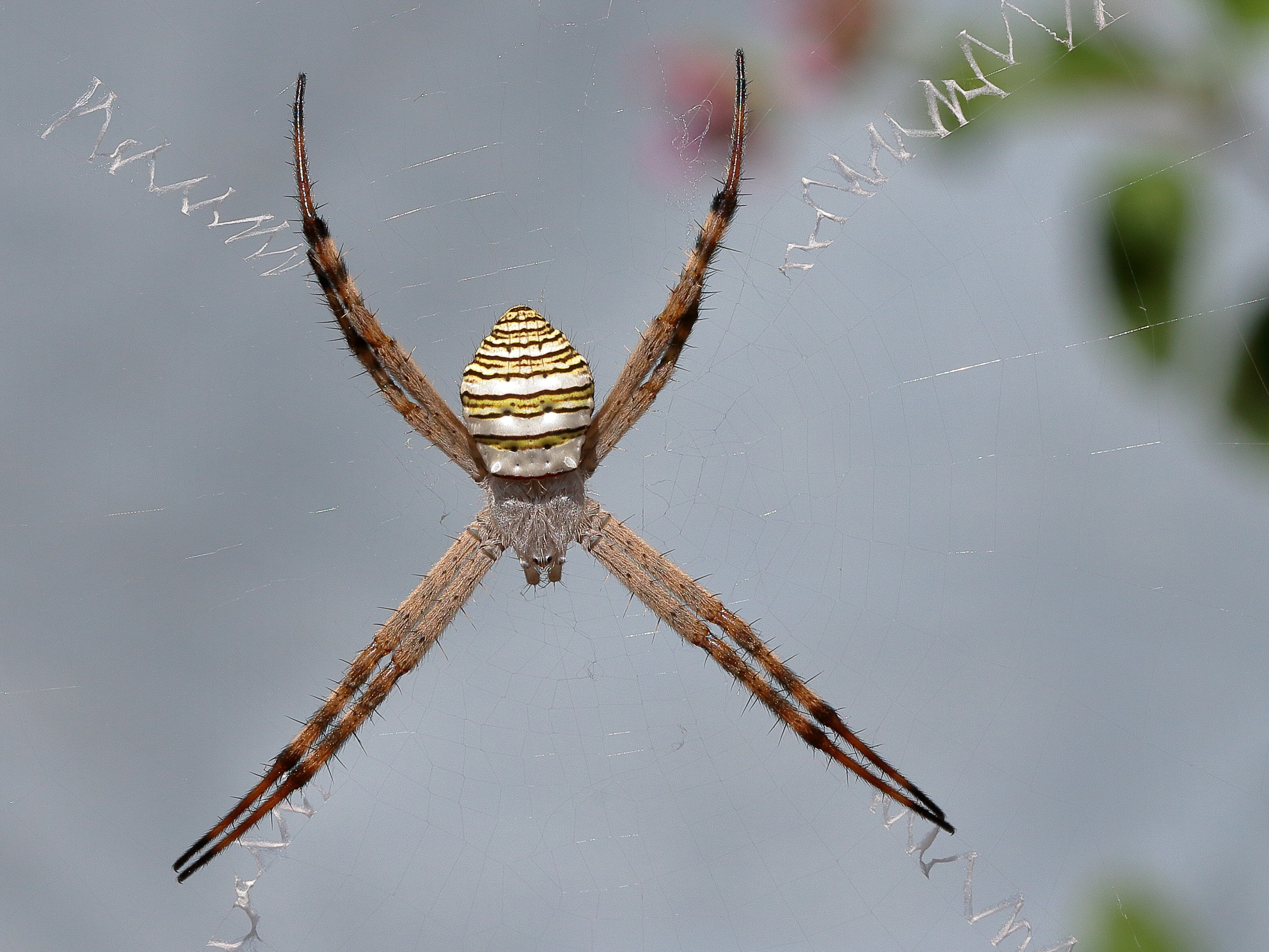
- Argiope magnifica female dorsal view, Cairns
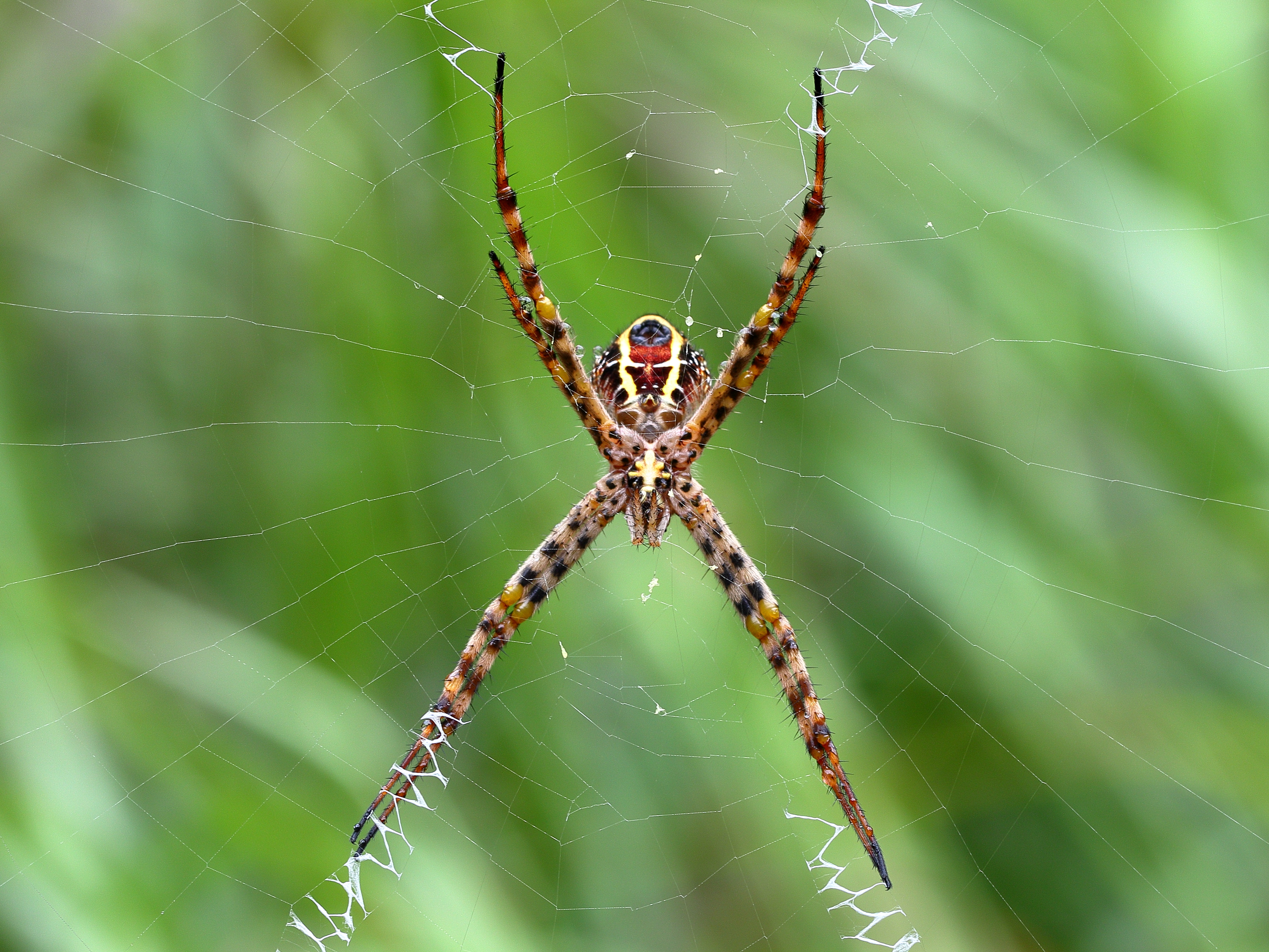
- Ventral view

Scientific classification
- Domain: Eukaryota
- Kingdom: Animalia
- Phylum: Arthropoda
- Subphylum: Chelicerata
- Class: Arachnida
- Order: Araneae
- Infraorder: Araneomorphae
- Family: Araneidae
- Genus: Argiope
- Species: A. magnifica

Binomial name
- Argiope magnifica L. Koch, 1871

Synonyms

= Argiope magnifica =

Species of spider

Argiope magnifica is a species of orb web spider found in tropical areas of north-east Queensland, Australia, eastern Papua New Guinea and the Solomon Islands. It is commonly known as the magnificent St Andrew's cross spider. This species is similar in size to the sympatric Argiope keyserlingi; females can be distinguished from those of A. keyserlingi via extensive differences in abdominal colouration and patterns. The males of these two species are almost indistinguishable.

Little is known about the biology of Argiope magnifica. However, like most orb-web spiders, males are much smaller than females. Females of this species construct web decorations. As of October 2020, there are 57 records of Argiope magnifica listed in the Atlas of Living Australia.

== Gallery ==
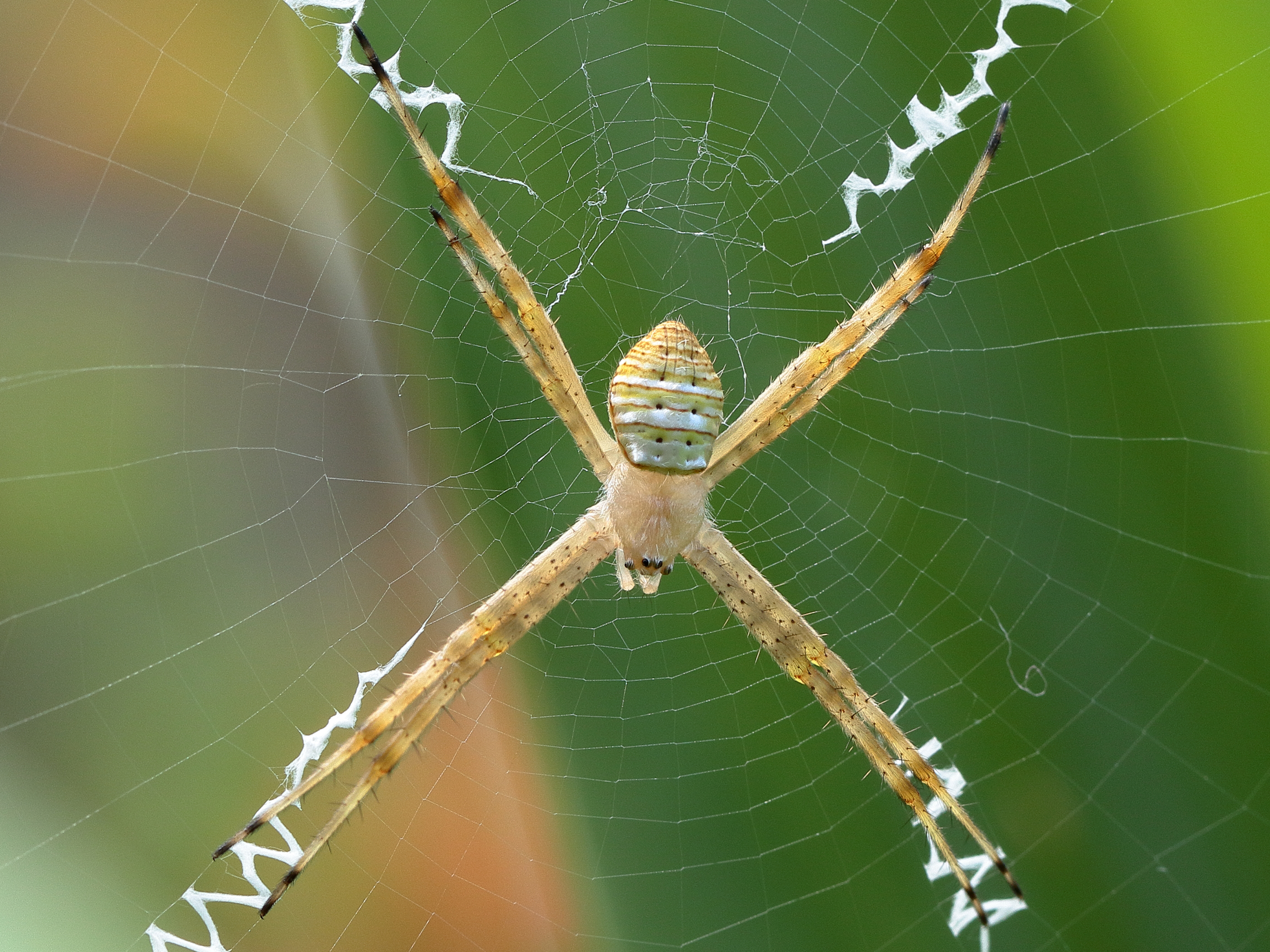
A.magnifica juvenile dorsal

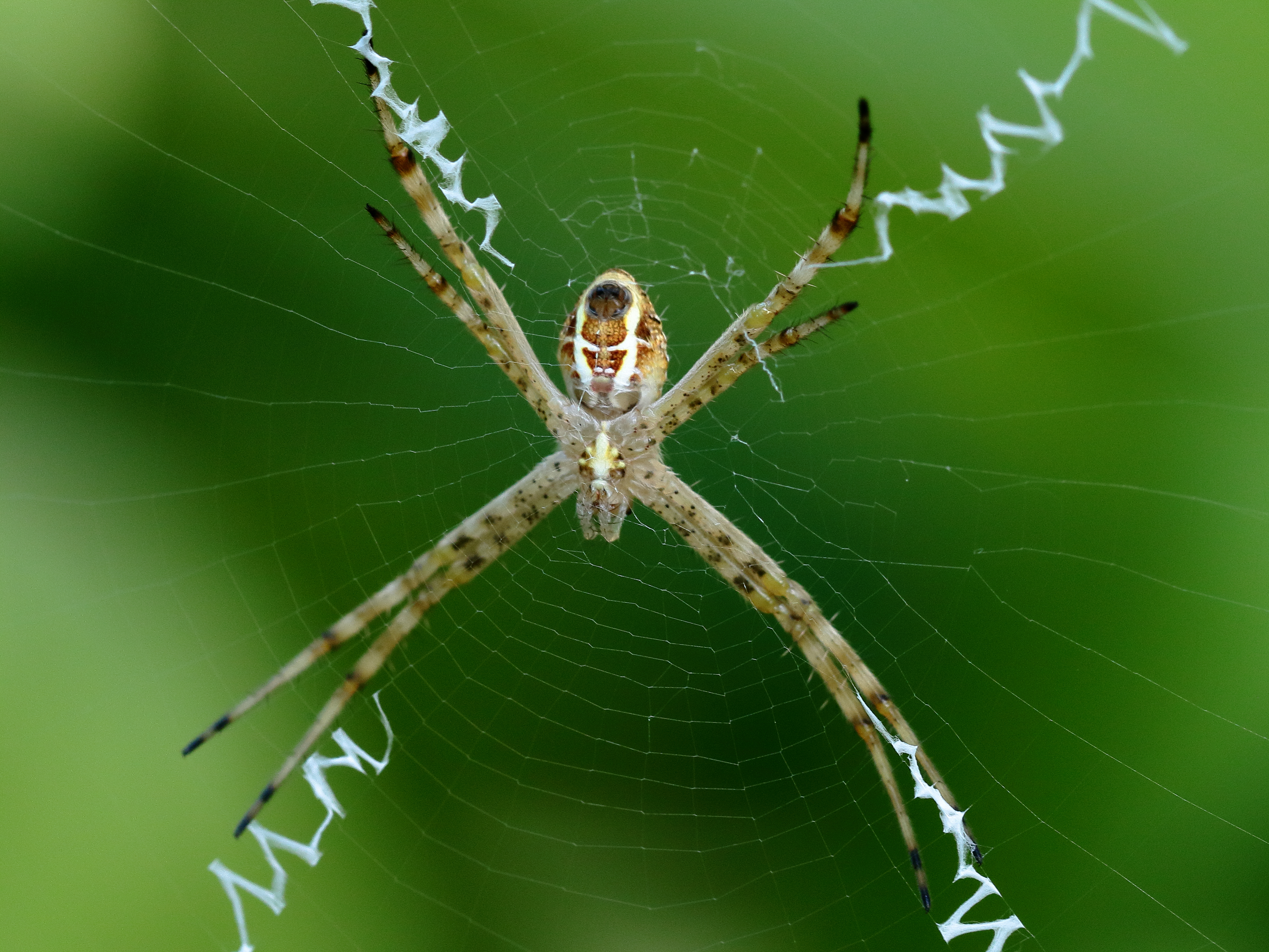
A.magnifica juvenile ventral
