= Metabolic ecology =

Metabolic ecology is a field of ecology aiming to understand constraints on metabolic organization as important for understanding almost all life processes. Main focus is on the metabolism of individuals, emerging intra- and inter-specific patterns, and the evolutionary perspective.

Two main metabolic theories that have been applied in ecology are Kooijman's Dynamic energy budget (DEB) theory and the West, Brown, and Enquist (WBE) metabolic scaling theory. Both theories have an individual-based metabolic underpinning but have fundamentally different assumptions. Metabolic Scaling Theory is based more in first principles and makes several simplifying assumptions to better reveal the generalities of the role of metabolism in shaping organismal form and function and its impact on ecology and evolution. In many ways, DEB is a more parameterized species-level version of the WBE theory.

Models of individual metabolism follow the energy uptake and allocation, and can focus on mechanisms and constraints of energy transport (transport models), or dynamic use of stored metabolites (energy budget models).
