= DEBtox =

The DEBtox method for the evaluation of effects of toxicants makes use of the Dynamic Energy Budget (DEB) theory to quantify the effect. See the Organisation for Economic Co-operation and Development (OECD) report, below, for a description of the method.

Toxicants, after they have been taken up by the organism and reached the target site, are assumed to affect one or more metabolic processes as specified in DEB theory. Examples of such processes are the costs for maintenance, assimilation of energy from food, costs for producing somatic tissues, costs for the production of offspring, and hazards to the developing embryo.

A change in a single metabolic process has particular consequences for both growth and reproduction of the organism. Therefore, the specific pattern of growth and reproduction over time provides information about the affected process. In this way, the DEBtox method can be used to explain observed effect patterns over time, as well as the links between effects on body size and reproduction.

A key concept in this method is the determination of the No Effect Concentration. The DEBtox method is able to extract this parameter efficiently from experimental data by making use of knowledge of how effects will show up in the data if they would be present. Not all details of the DEB theory are used in this method; effects on survival as specified by the hazard model hardly uses any detail of the DEB theory, for instance, but is fully consistent with how DEB theory deals with aging as a result of the effects of free radicals.
