= V0-morph =

A V0-morph is an organism whose surface area remains constant as the organism grows.

The reason why the concept is important in the context of the Dynamic Energy Budget theory is that food (substrate) uptake is proportional to surface area, and maintenance to volume. The surface area that is of importance is that part that is involved in substrate uptake.

Biofilms on a flat solid substrate are examples of V0-morphs; they grow in thickness, but not in surface area that is involved in nutrient exchange. Other examples are dinophyta and diatoms that have a cell wall that does not change during the cell cycle. During cell-growth, when the amounts of protein and carbohydrates increase, the vacuole shrinks. The outer membrane that is involved in nutrient uptake remains constant. At cell division, the daughter cells rapidly take up water, complete a new cell wall and the cycle repeats.

Rods (bacteria that have the shape of a rod and grow in length, but not in diameter) are a static mixture between a V0- and a V1-morph, where the caps act as V0-morphs and the cylinder between the caps as V1-morph.The mixture is called static because the weight coefficients of the contributions of the V0- and V1-morph terms in the shape correction function are constant during growth.

Crusts, such as lichens that grow on a solid substrate, are a dynamic mixture between a V0- and a V1-morph, where the inner part acts as V0-morph, and the outer annulus as V1-morph.The mixture is called dynamic because the weight coefficients of the contributions of the V0- and V1-morph terms in the shape correction function change during growth. The Dynamic Energy Budget theory explains why the diameter of crusts grow linearly in time at constant substrate availability.

== See also ==
- Dynamic energy budget
- isomorph
- V1-morph
- shape correction function
