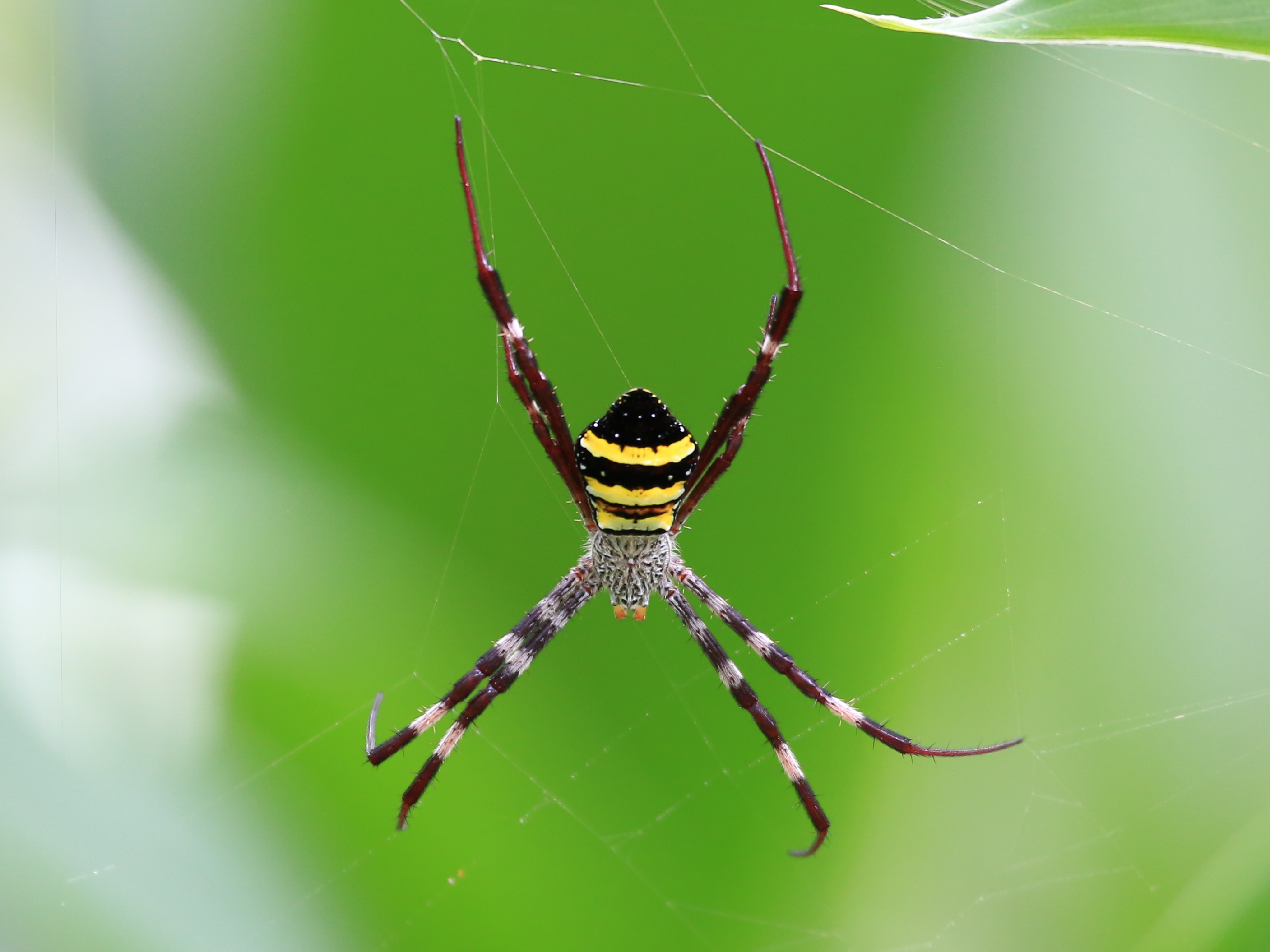

Scientific classification
- Kingdom: Animalia
- Phylum: Arthropoda
- Subphylum: Chelicerata
- Class: Arachnida
- Order: Araneae
- Infraorder: Araneomorphae
- Family: Araneidae
- Genus: Argiope
- Species: A. aetherea

Binomial name
- Argiope aetherea (Walckenaer, 1841)

Synonyms
- List: Epeira aetherea Walckenaer, 1841; Argiope regalis L. Koch, 1871; Argiope variabilis Bradley, 1876; Argiope lunata Bradley, 1876; Argiope brownii O. Pickard-Cambridge, 1877; Argiope verecunda Thorell, 1878; Argiope aetherea (Walckenaer, 1841); Argiope friedericii Strand, 1911; Argiope wolfi Strand, 1911; Argiope maerens Kulczyński, 1911; Argiope udjirica Strand, 1911; Argiope wogeonicola Strand, 1913; Gea rotunda Hogg, 1915; Argiope novae-pommeraniae Strand, 1915

= Argiope aetherea =

Species of spider

Argiope aetherea is a common, large orb-web spider (family Araneidae). Like other species of Argiope, it is commonly known as the St Andrew's Cross spider, due to the characteristic cross-shaped web decorations female spiders often include in their webs. A. aetherea is similar in appearance to A. keyserlingi, however female A. aetherea are generally larger than A. keyserlingi. Like most orb-web spiders, A. aetherea shows considerable sexual size dimorphism, with females being many times larger than males.

== Distribution ==
Argiope aetherea is found from China to Australia.

== Subspecies ==
There exists a subspecies from New Guinea:

- Argiope aetherea annulipes Thorell, 1881

== Gallery ==
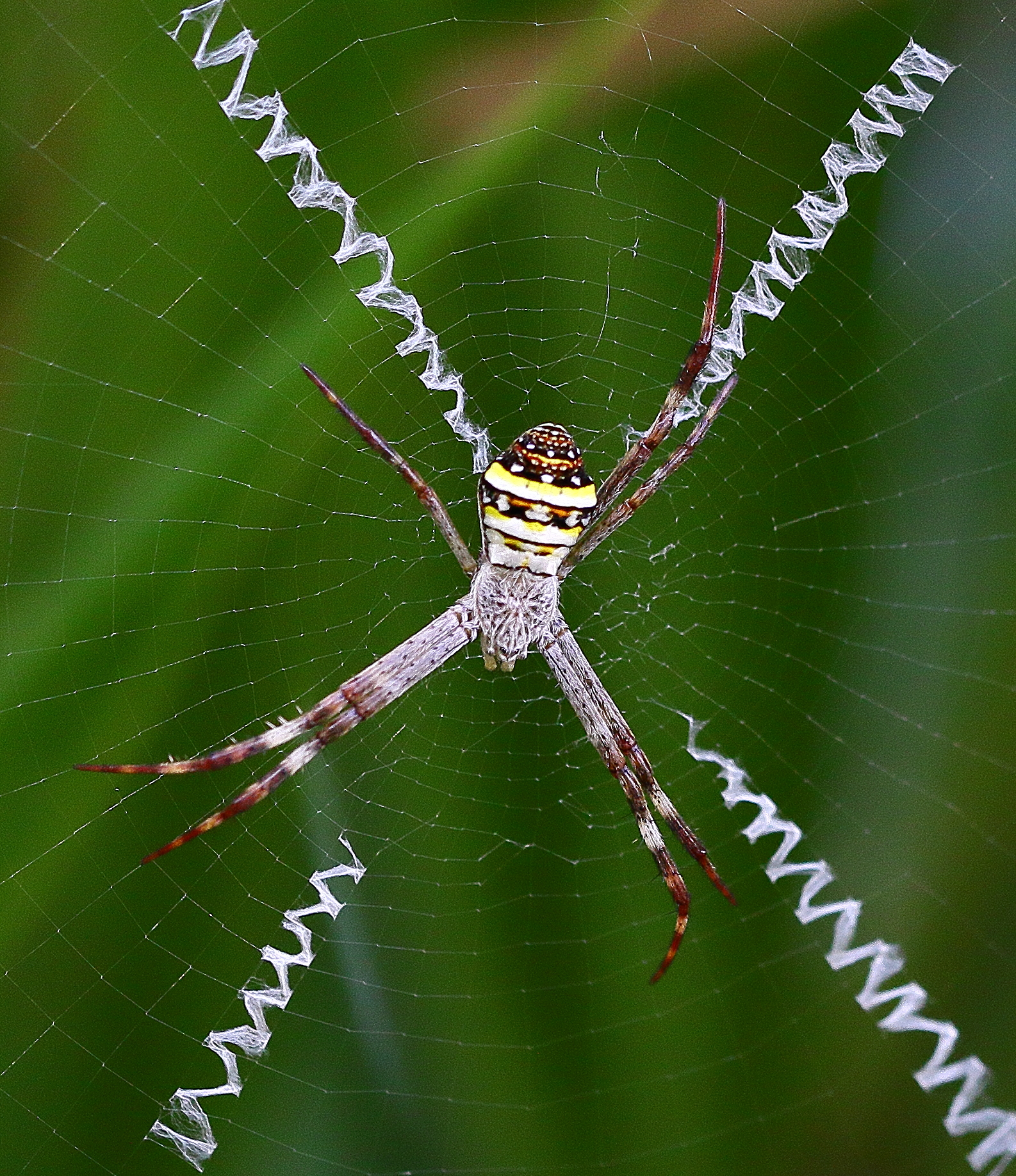
Argiope aetherea with cross shaped web decoration

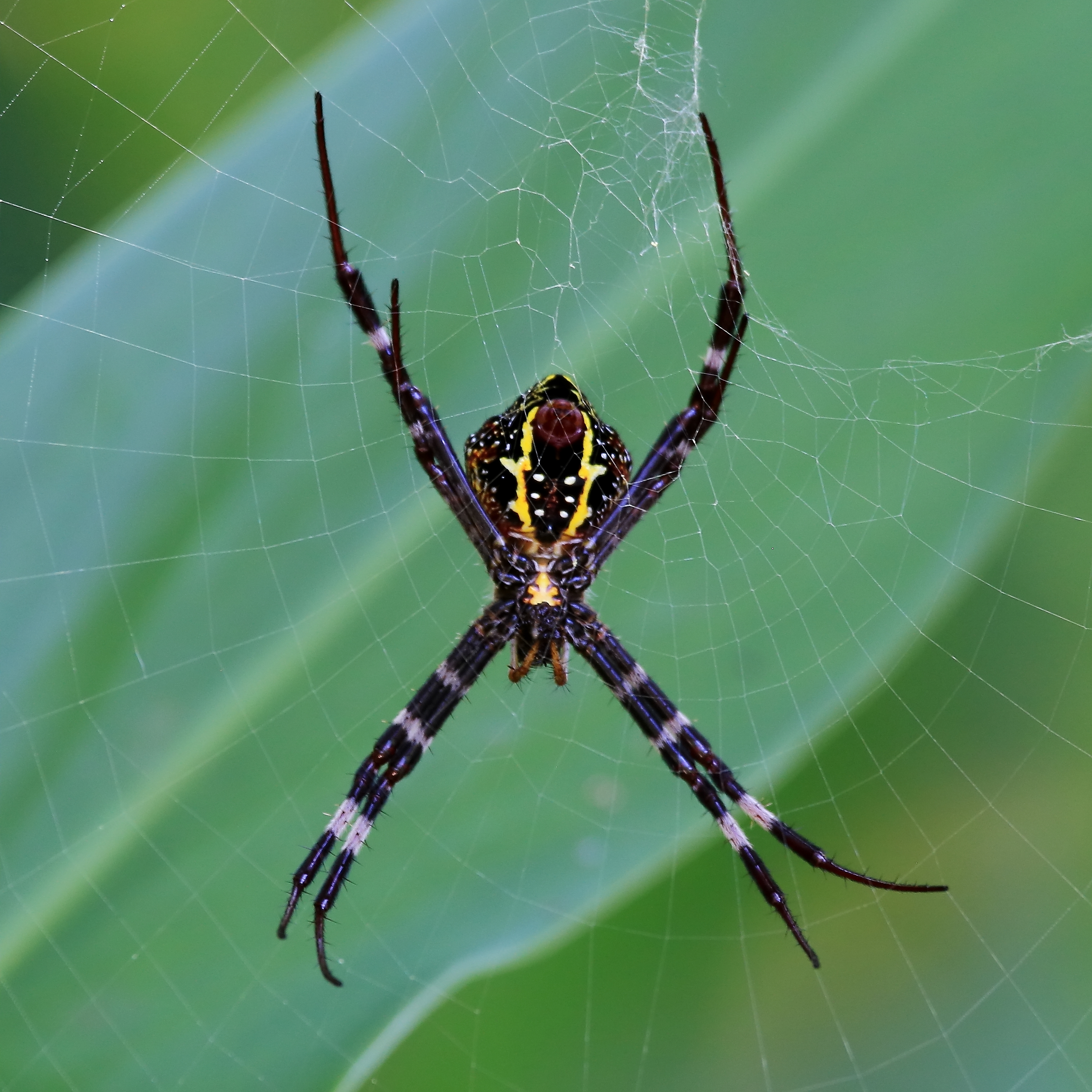
Argiope aetherea (female, ventral)

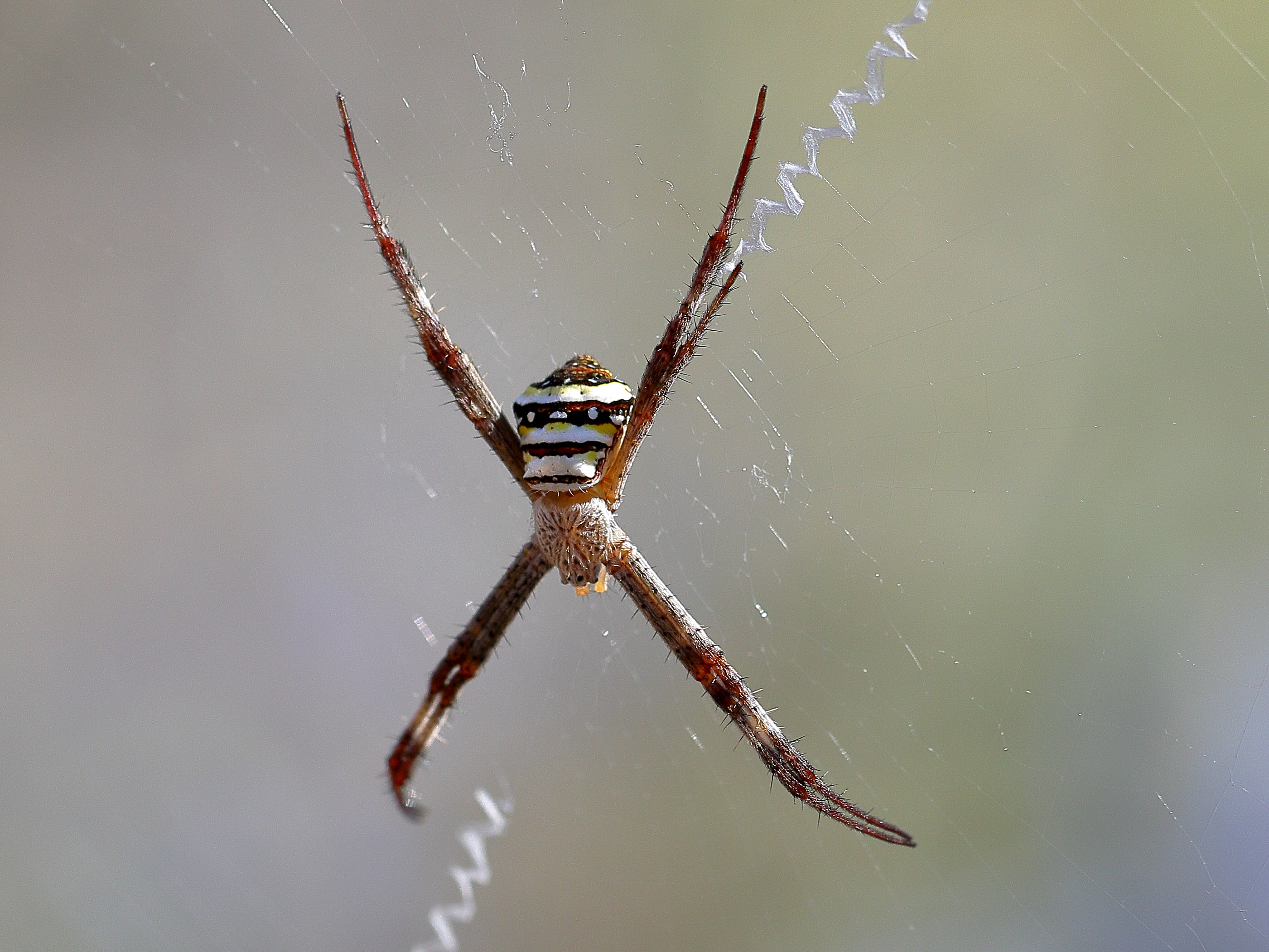
Female, dorsal

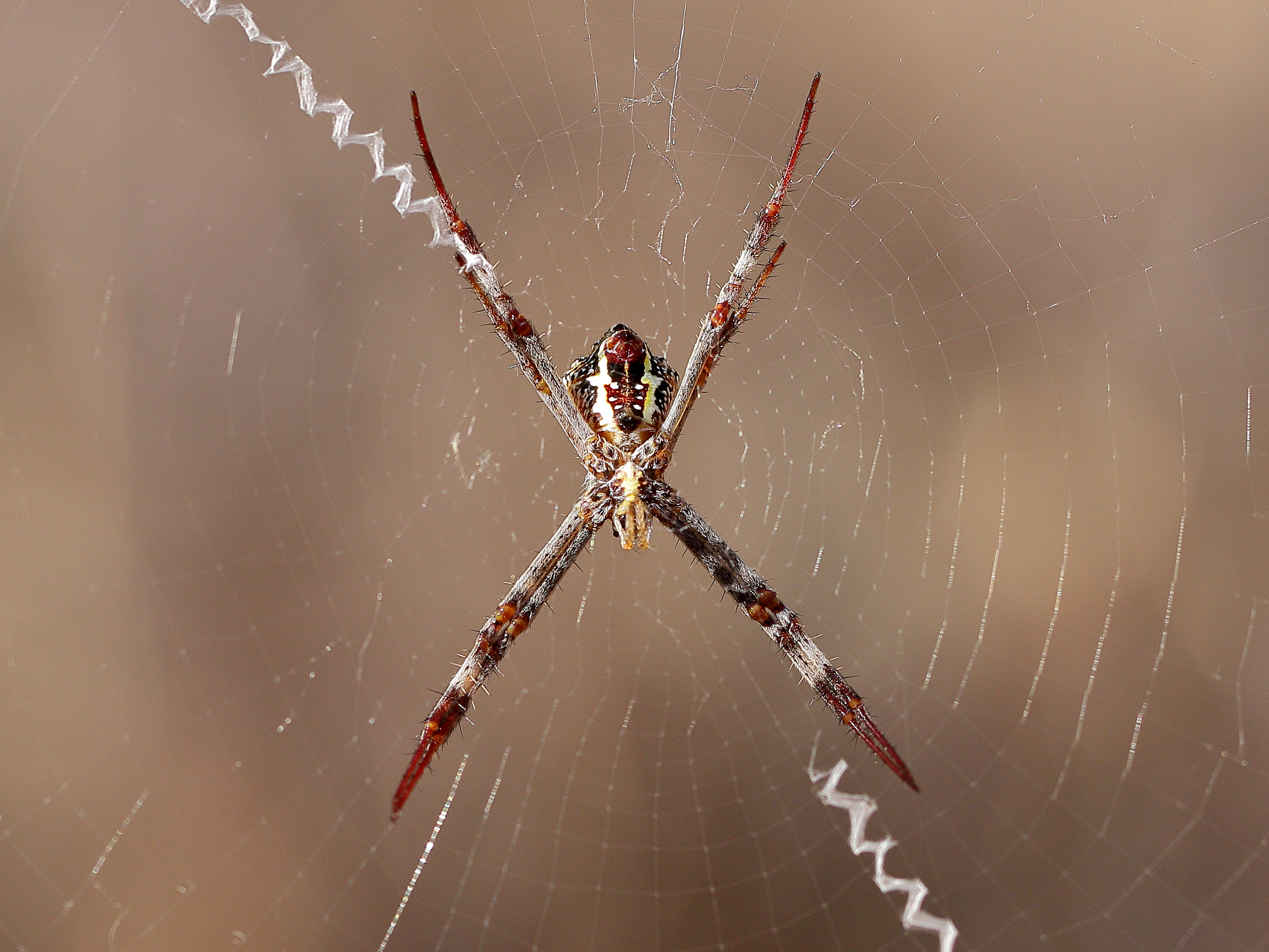
Same spider, ventral

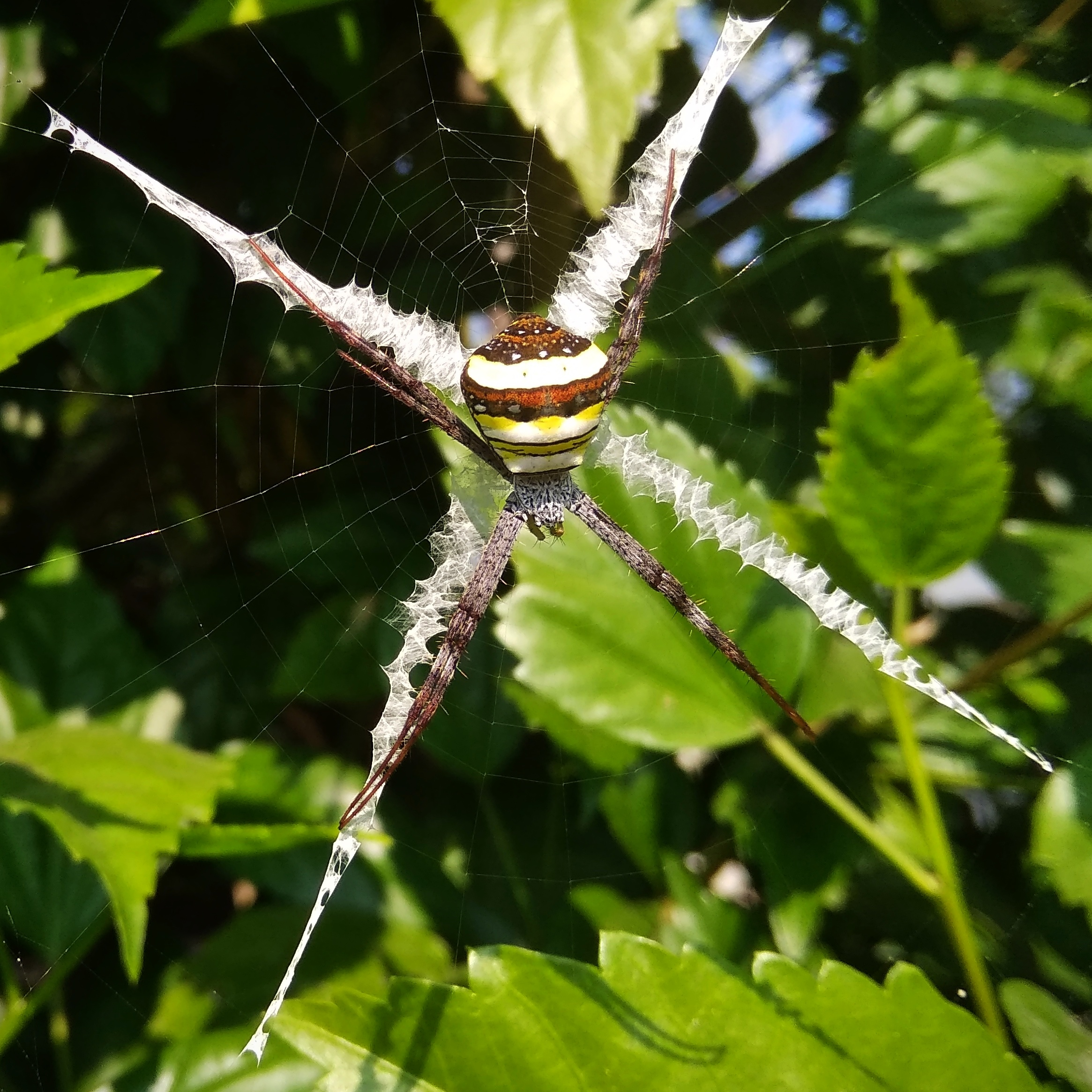
Argiope aetherea

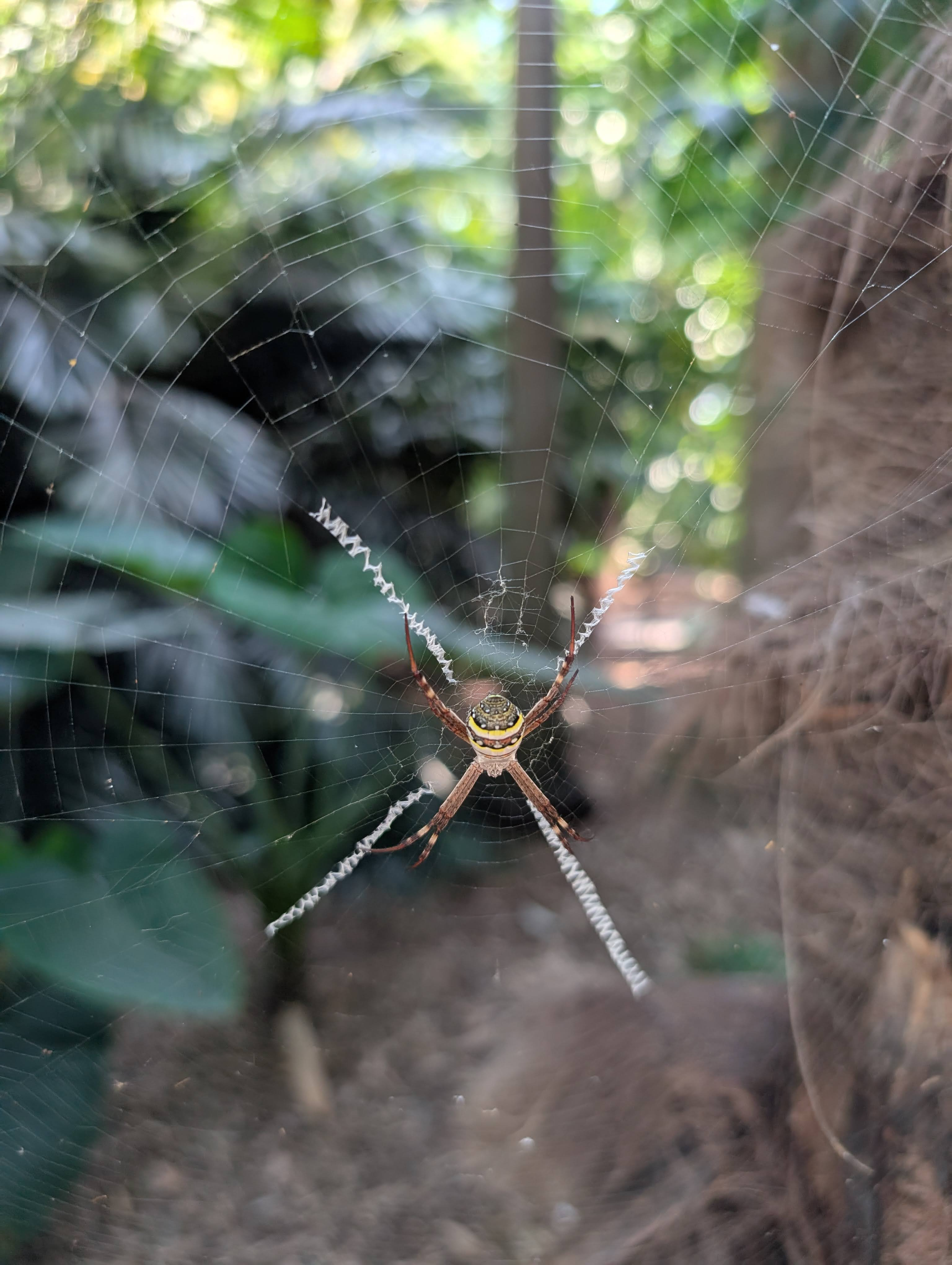
Argiope aetherea, Royal Botanic Garden Sydney, Australia
