= Isomorph =

Organism that does not change in shape during growth

An isomorph is an organism that does not change in shape during growth. The implication is that its volume is proportional to its cubed length, and its surface area to its squared length. This holds for any shape it might have; the actual shape determines the proportionality constants.

The reason why the concept is important in the context of the Dynamic Energy Budget (DEB) theory is that food (substrate) uptake is proportional to surface area, and maintenance to volume. Since volume grows faster than surface area, this controls the ultimate size of the organism. Alfred Russel Wallace wrote this in a letter to E. B. Poulton in 1865. The surface area that is of importance is the part that is involved in substrate uptake (e.g. the gut surface), which is typically a fixed fraction of the total surface area in an isomorph. The DEB theory explains why isomorphs grow according to the von Bertalanffy curve if food availability is constant.

Organisms can also change in shape during growth, which affects the growth curve and the ultimate size, see for instance V0-morphs and V1-morphs. Isomorphs can also be called V2/3-morphs.

Most animals approximate isomorphy, but plants in a vegetation typically start as V1-morphs, then convert to isomorphs, and end up as V0-morphs (if neighbouring plants affect their uptake).

== See also ==
- Dynamic energy budget
- V0-morph
- V1-morph
- shape correction function
