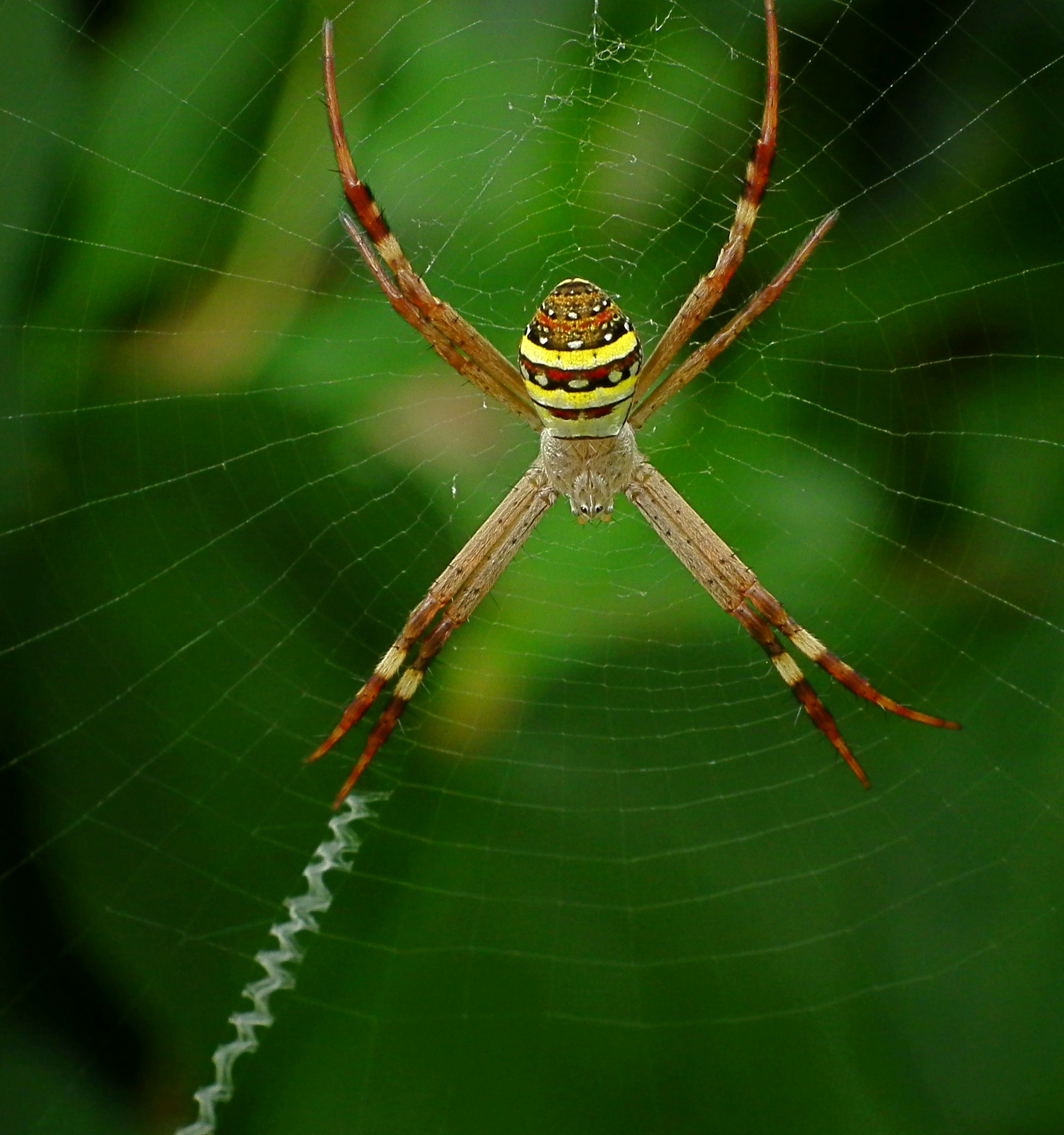
- Juvenile female Argiope keyserlingi from Brisbane

Scientific classification
- Kingdom: Animalia
- Phylum: Arthropoda
- Subphylum: Chelicerata
- Class: Arachnida
- Order: Araneae
- Infraorder: Araneomorphae
- Family: Araneidae
- Genus: Argiope
- Species: A. keyserlingi

Binomial name
- Argiope keyserlingi Karsch, 1878

= Argiope keyserlingi =

St Andrew's cross spider

St Andrew's cross spider

Argiope keyserlingi is a species of orb-web spider found on the east coast of Australia, from Victoria to northern Queensland. It is very similar in appearance to a closely related north Queensland species, Argiope aetherea. A. keyserlingi is commonly found in large populations in suburban parks and gardens, particularly among the leaves of Lomandra longifolia. Like many species of orb-web spiders, A. keyserlingi shows considerable sexual dimorphism, with the females being many times larger than the males. Mature females can be seen during the summer, and seeing multiple males on the web of one female is not uncommon.

A. keyserlingi is commonly known as the St. Andrew's cross spider, due to the construction of bands of silk forming the arms of an X-shaped cross, similar to the one upon which St. Andrew is traditionally said to have been crucified. Juveniles of this species sometimes build a spiral-shaped pattern of silk. Referred to as web decorations or stabilimenta, these bands are thought to increase the species' prey capture rate, but as in other species, they have been found to protect the spider against predators.

A. keyserlingi is an important model species in studies of spider ecology and behaviour. Using this species, scientists have investigated sperm competition, sexual size dimorphism, cryptic female choice, the role of pheromones in mating behaviour, and the function and evolution of web decorations.

Its main predators in Sydney are mantids and birds.

This type of orb-weaver is cathemeral.

== Taxonomy ==
The spider was named by Fredrich Karsch in 1878 after the mythological Greek character of Argiope, a nymph from the town Eleusis in southern Greece. The specific name keyserlingi was chosen to honor arachnologist Eugen von Keyserling.

== Description ==
Females of the species vary from 10 to 16 mm in size. Their glossy carapaces consist of silver, yellow, red, and black bands on their upper segment with two horizontal yellow belts beneath. Males of the species generally vary from 3 to 4 mm in size. They are brown and pearly coloured. St. Andrew's cross spiders rest with their legs oriented in pairs.

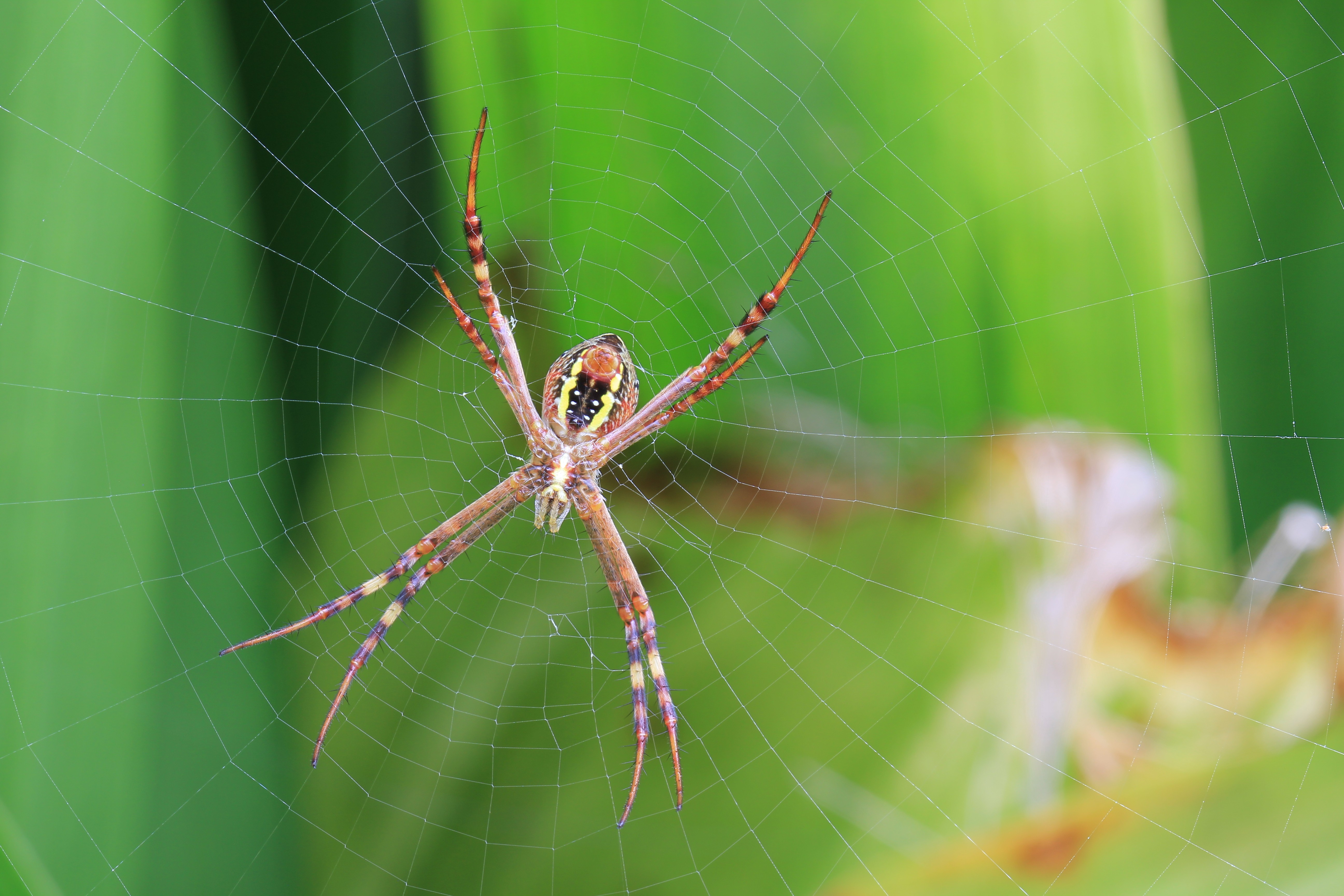
A photograph of the underside of a female St Andrew's cross spider

== Distribution and habitat ==
The St Andrew's cross spider can be found mostly in rainforest margins, open forests, and heathlands of eastern Australia. They can also be found in the northern segment of the Northern Territory, in the northern segment of Tasmania, in the western segment of Western Australia, near Tedi River of Papua New Guinea, on the Malakula island of Vanuatu, and on Lord Howe Island. They construct medium-sized webs on low, shrubby vegetation.

Individuals tend to prefer closed habitats, with preferences being determined by foliage density and predator density. They avoid placing their webs within or between trees when there is bird presence. Juveniles are exclusively found in closed habitats, likely to avoid insectivores like birds and lizards and to find more favourable vegetation for building webs. A. keyserlingi may move into open habitats as subadults or adults, possibly due to requiring larger prey to sustain growth.

== Web ==
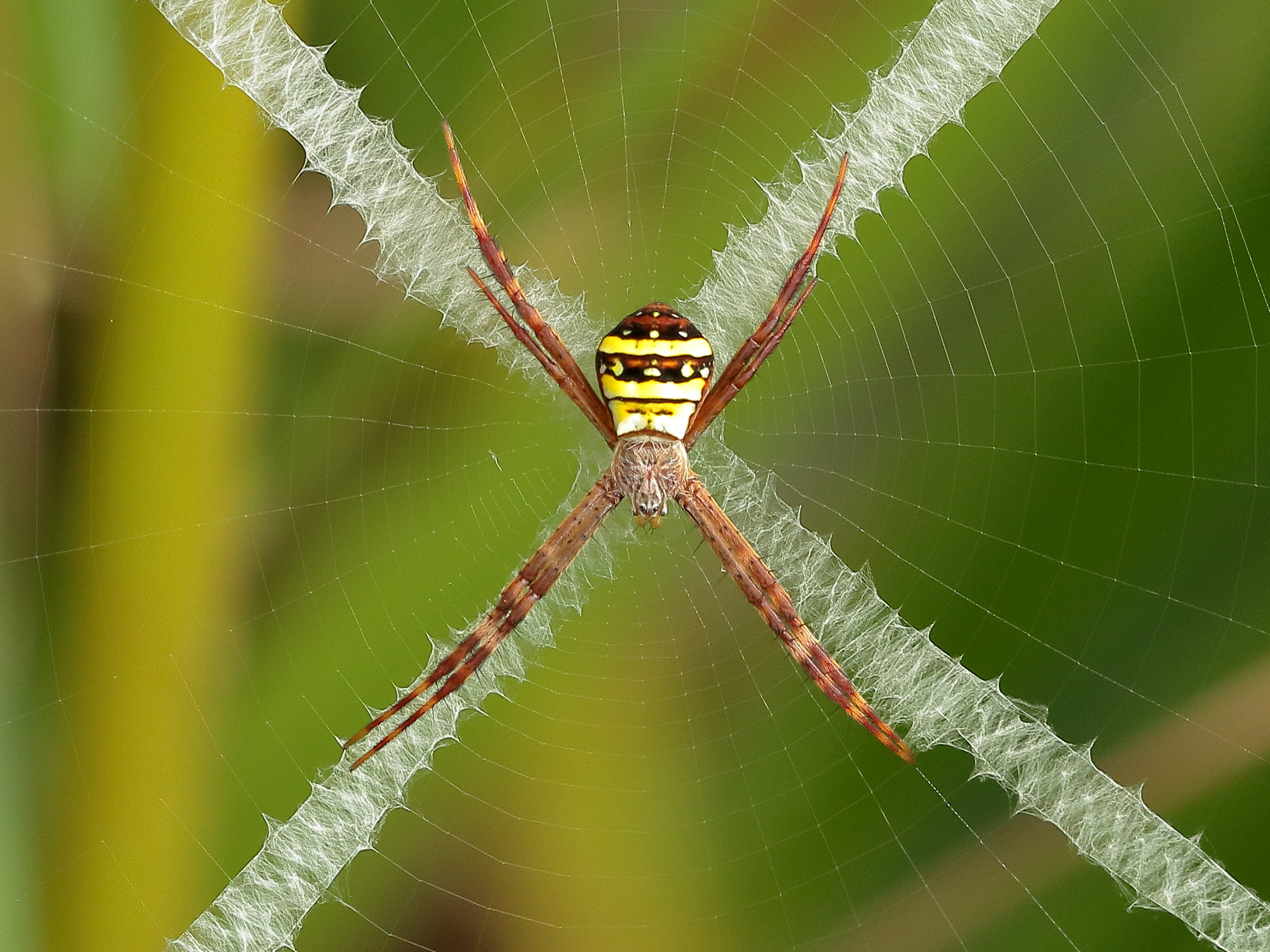
A female St Andrew's Cross spider on her web with its distinct X-shaped decorations.

The web of the orb-weaving spider possesses meandering, bluish-white ribbons consisting of silk that can form either a full or partial cross through the center of the web. The web decorations are usually cruciform, and are comprised zig-zag silk bands. The purpose of the stabilimentum has long perplexed biologists, who first thought that the stabilimentum's purpose was to strengthen the web. Other ideas associate it with capturing prey or evading its predators.

The web patterns of A. keyserlingi can be highly variable and context-dependent, even within the same individual. The size of the web increases with the spider's size, but the size of the web decorations does not increase based on web size. A. keyserlingi will reconstruct their webs daily or every few days, depending on damage, with the frequency decreasing when exposed to predators or preparing to moult. If the web hasn't been destroyed (e.g. by predators or weather), the spider will consume the silk of the old web, allowing them to recycle the materials for construction of a new web.

=== Web architecture ===
The architecture of the web is influenced by several factors, including the availability of space, air temperature, and prey abundance. A. keyserlingi also adjusts the size and design of their webs depending on their feeding history. Food-deprived spiders invest more energy in web-building by producing more silk to increase their chances of catching prey. They tend to construct larger webs with a denser spiral arrangement, presumably to increase the likelihood of prey capture. In contrast, food-satiated spiders build smaller webs with larger mesh sizes, which might help reduce exposure to predators and conserve energy for reproduction.

While the design of the stabilimentum is independent of the web's overall arrangement, it is affected by factors such as prey populations, light intensity, and temperature. Spiders also modify their web decoration depending on food availability. Specifically, when food is more scarce, they reduce the number of silk bands (decorations) and when prey is plentiful, they increase the number of bands. Prior to moulting, A. keyserlingi will add additional web decorations to their existing web, possibly to provide mechanical support to the web and reduce exposure to predators in their vulnerable state during and following moulting. The oversized web decorations are removed following the moult.

=== Prey capture ===
The stabilimentum in the web of Argiope keyserlingi appears to function as a prey attractant. One feature of the stabilimentum is that it effectively reflects ultraviolet light, making it attractive to flying insects. Research suggests that the stabilimentum uses UV light and/or blue light to exploit a visual bias in insects, as most insect receptors are sensitive to both blue and UV light, and many prey species of A. keyserlingi, including bees and flies, are attracted to UV light.

However, the design of the stabilimentum also makes the web and the spider more visible to diurnal predators, such as birds and mantids. The shape of the decoration can vary among a complete cross, a partial cross with one to three arms, or occasionally an absence of decoration. This variability can induce web-recognition problems for predators, potentially providing a form of camouflage or distraction.

Once potential prey land on the web, the spider's attack strategy varies depending on the prey type. For example, A. keyserlingi wraps larger prey like bees and blowflies in silk before feeding, whereas it does not wrap smaller prey like Drosophila.

== Diet ==
Prey of the St Andrew's cross spider include flies, moths, butterflies, bees, and other insects. The orb-weaver wraps its prey immaculately with silk before digesting, and smaller prey may be prioritized.

== Threat response ==
When the orb-weaver is threatened, it responds by either ejecting from its web or vibrating the web strenuously so the web becomes a blur, confusing its predator. These two methods may not always succeed, though, as sometimes their corpses can be found in mud cells of Sceliphron wasps and their webs can be left empty and damaged.

When exposed to chemical cues from predators, the attack behaviour of A. keyserlingi will change. They respond to and attack prey caught in the web faster, decreasing their foraging time overall, which is thought to decrease exposure to predators.

== Breeding ==
Mating takes place from summer to autumn and is a perilous occasion for miniature male St Andrew's cross spiders. Males settle on the upper segment of the web; some of them may be missing legs, caused by encountering inhospitable females. The male then materializes a mating thread within the web, which he uses to attract the hospitable female by oscillating the thread. The female then hangs her pear-shaped sac in a mesh of threads, frequently surrounded by leaves to camouflage the sac's greenish silk, because egg sacs are the target of wasps and flies.

== Mating behaviour ==
=== Mate choice ===
In Argiope keyserlingi, mate choice dynamics differ between males and females, influenced by factors such as prior mating experiences and food availability. Virgin males tend to prefer virgin females, while mated males display no discernible preference. Female aggression towards courting males can vary based on the female's level of food satiation, with better-fed females showing more aggression.

==== Sex pheromones ====
Female spiders embed contact pheromones into their web silk. Males detect these pheromones through physical contact with the silk to determine if the female has been mated already and gain other information such as species identity and sexual receptivity. A. keyserlingi is also known to use airborne pheromones, possibly to signal the female's location to males, but the role of these in male mate choice is not known.

==== Courtship ====
A male Argiope keyserlingi engaging in vibratory courtship

Courtship in A. keyserlingi takes place on the female's web and mating takes place on a mating thread. Male courtship behaviours are characterized by a series of vibratory signals from the male, including shudders, abdominal wags, and mating thread dances.

Below is a breakdown of the courtship process leading into copulation:

1. The male approaches the female by crawling along the outer threads surrounding the web.
2. Once in the web, the male slowly makes his way to the centre of the web (the hub), where the female is located.
3. At the hub, the male 'tastes' the female by touching her legs and abdomen with his legs, then passing his legs through his mouth. This may last several minutes to over an hour, occurring in intervals with periods of rest.
4. The male cuts a small section of the web above the female and constructs a mating thread, possibly reinforcing it with additional lines of silk.
5. Hanging from the mating thread, the male produces vibrations by plucking and bouncing on the thread.
6. The female moves onto the mating thread and exposes her genital opening (the epigyne).
7. The male 'waggles' and begins copulation.

Shudders have been shown to have a strong influence on the female's time to enter a copulatory position. Higher rates of shuddering correspond to greater female reluctance (higher delay), possibly because high shudder rates compromise the duration and quality of the shudder, but high shudder rates while maintaining an 'acceptable' duration is preferred. Longer shudders may also reduce the female's aggression, reducing the risk of being attacked and cannibalised following copulation.

Females may also display 'aggressive pumping' during courtship. Males adjust their courtship behavior based on these signals, with higher rates of female pumping leading to higher delays in the male building the mating thread for copulation.

Courtship behaviour is also affected by the age of both the male and female. Males display longer shudders when courting older females and older males take longer to approach females and perform more shudders, suggesting that males invest more into courtship with age.

=== Sexual cannibalism ===
A male and a female St Andrew's Cross Spider initiate copulation, followed by the female cannibalising the male

Argiope keyserlingi is a sexually cannibalistic species, with females potentially consuming the male after copulation. About 50% of males survive their first mating, but are always consumed following their second mating, resulting in a phenomenon where males never mate more than twice. Research also indicates that each pedipalp cannot be used more than once, suggesting males are also physiologically limited to two copulations. Levi suggests that the embolus, found on the pedipalp and involved in sperm transfer, may become damaged during copulation, preventing further mating.

Cannibalism in A. keyserlingi does not seem to be influenced by the female's physical condition or serve as a strategy to gain nutrients for egg production. It may function as a form of cryptic female choice, allowing females to influence fertilization outcomes. Females can adjust the timing of cannibalism to limit the copulation duration, and therefore amount of sperm transferred, typically favouring males with a smaller size.

Despite no direct link to fecundity, females that consume the male will produce eggs with higher nutrient density. Given the differences in nutrient composition between the spider and the egg and the species' sexual size dimorphism, post-copulatory feeding is not the source this energy but instead, the energy is drawn from the female's somatic reserves. Blamires suggests that protein uptake acts as a trigger to draw out the energy from these reserves.
