= V1-morph =

Organism that changes shape during growth

An V1-morph is an organism that changes in shape during growth such that its surface area is proportional to its volume. In most cases both volume and surface area are proportional to length

The reason the concept is important in the context of the Dynamic Energy Budget theory is that food (substrate) uptake is proportional to surface area, and maintenance to volume. The surface area that is of importance is that part that is involved in substrate uptake. Since uptake is proportional to maintenance for V1-morphs, there is no size control, and an organism grows exponentially at constant food (substrate) availability.

Filaments, such as fungi that form hyphae growing in length, but not in diameter, are examples of V1-morphs. Sheets that extend, but do not change in thickness, like some colonial bacteria and algae, are another example.

An important property of V1-morphs is that the distinction between the individual and the population level disappears; a single long filament grows as fast as many small ones of the same diameter and the same total length.

== See also ==
- Dynamic Energy Budget
- V0-morph
- isomorph
- shape correction function
