= Dynamic reserve =

Theory of metabolism

Dynamic reserve, in the context of the dynamic energy budget theory, refers to the set of metabolites (mostly polymers and lipids) that an organism can use for metabolic purposes. These chemical compounds can have active metabolic functions, however. They are not just "set apart for later use." Reserve differs from structure in the first place by its dynamics. Reserve has an implied turnover, because it is synthesized from food (or other substrates in the environment) and used by metabolic processes occurring in cells. The turnover of structure depends on the maintenance of an organism. Maintenance is not required for reserve. A freshly laid egg consists almost exclusively of reserve, and hardly respires. The chemical compounds in the reserve have the same turnover, while that in the structure can have a different turnover, and so it depends on the compound.

== Functionality ==
Reserves are synthesized from environmental substrates (food) for use by the metabolism for the purpose of somatic maintenance (including protein turnover, maintenance of concentration gradients across membranes, activity and other types of work), growth (increase of structural mass), maturity maintenance (installation of regulation systems, preparation for reproduction, maintenance of defense systems, such as the immune system), maturation (increase of the state of maturity) and reproduction. This organizational position of reserve creates a rather constant internal chemical environment, with only an indirect coupling with the extra-organismal environment. Reserves as well as structure are taken to be generalised compounds, i.e. mixtures of a large number of compounds, which do not change in composition. The latter requirement is called the strong homeostasis assumption. Polymers (carbohydrates, proteins, ribosomal RNA) and lipids form the main bulk of reserves and of structure.

Some reasons for including reserve are to give an explanation for (from):

1. the metabolic memory; changes in food (substrate) availability affect production (growth or reproduction) with some delay. Growth continues for some time during starvation; embryo development is fueled by reserves
2. the composition of biomass depends on growth rate. With two components (reserves and structure) particular changes in composition can be captured. More complex changes require several reserves, as is required for autotrophs.
3. the body size scaling of life history parameters. The specific respiration rate decreases with (maximum) body size between species because large bodied species have relatively more reserve. Many other life history parameters directly or indirectly relate to respiration.
4. the observed respiration patterns, which reflect the use of energy. Freshly laid eggs hardly respire, but their respiratory rates increase during development while egg weight decreases. After hatching, however, the respiration rate further increases, while the weight now also increases
5. all mass fluxes are linear combinations of assimilation, dissipation and growth. If reserves are omitted, there is not enough flexibility to capture product formation and explain indirect calorimetry.
