= Generalised compound =

A generalized compound is a mixture of chemical compounds of constant composition, despite possible changes in the total amount. The concept is used in the Dynamic Energy Budget theory, where biomass is partitioned into a limited set of generalised compounds, which contain a high percentage of organic compounds. The amount of generalized compound can be quantified in terms of weight, but more conveniently in terms of C-moles. The concept of strong homeostasis has an intimate relationship with that of generalised compound.
