= Measures of pollutant concentration =

Measures of pollutant concentration are used to determine risk assessment in public health.

Industry is continually synthesizing new chemicals, the regulation of which requires evaluation of the potential danger for human health and the environment. Risk assessment is nowadays considered essential for making these decisions on a scientifically sound basis.

Measures or defined limits include:

- no-observed-adverse-effect level (NOAEL), also called no-effect concentration (NEC), no-observed-effect concentration (NOEC) or similarly
- lowest-observed-adverse-effect level (LOAEL)
- acceptable operator exposure level (AOEL)
- ECx (in percentage).

== No-effect concentration ==
No-effect concentration (NEC) is a risk assessment parameter that represents the concentration of a pollutant that will not harm the species involved, with respect to the effect that is studied. It is often the starting point for environmental policy.

There is not much debate on the existence of an NEC, but the assignment of a value is another matter. Current practice consists of the use of standard tests. In the standard tests groups of animals are exposed to different concentrations of chemicals and different effects such as survival, growth or reproduction are monitored. These toxicity tests typically result in a no-observed-effect concentration (NOEC, also called a no-observed-effect level, or NOEL). This NOEC has been severely criticized on statistical grounds by several authors and it was concluded that the NOEC should be abandoned.

== ECx ==
A proposed alternative is the use of so-called ECx – the concentration(s) showing x% effect (e.g. an EC_{50} in a survival experiment indicates the concentration where 50% of the test animals would die in that experiment). ECx concentrations also have their problems in applying them to risk assessment. Any other value for x other than zero may give the impression that an effect is accepted, and this is in conflict with the aim of maximally protecting the environment. In addition ECx values do depend on the exposure time. ECx values for survival decrease for increasing exposure time, until equilibrium has been established. This is because effects depend on internal concentrations, and that it takes time for the compound to penetrate the body of test organisms. However, sub-lethal endpoints (e.g., body size, reproductive output) may reveal less predictable effect patterns in time.

The shape of the effect patterns over time depends on properties of the test compound, properties of the organism, the endpoint considered and the dimensions in which the endpoint is expressed (e.g., body size or body weight; reproduction rate or cumulative reproduction).

== Biology-based ==
Biology-based methods not only aim to describe observed effects, but also to understand them in terms of underlying processes such as toxicokinetics, mortality, feeding, growth and reproduction (Kooijman 1997). This type of approach starts with the description of the uptake and elimination of a compound by an organism, as an effect can only be expected if the compound is inside the organism, and where the no-effect-concentration is one of the modeling parameters. As the approach is biologically based it is also possible by using the dynamic energy budget theory to incorporate multiple stressors (e.g. effects of food restriction, temperature, etc.) and processes that are active under field conditions (e.g. adaptation, population dynamics, species interactions, life cycle phenomena, etc.). The effects of these multiple stressors are excluded in the standard test procedures by keeping the local environment in the test constant. It is also possible to use these parameter values to predict effects at longer exposure times, or effects when the concentration in the medium is not constant. If the observed effects include those on survival and reproduction of individuals, these parameters can also be used to predict effects on growing populations in the field.
