= Dissociation rate =

The dissociation rate in chemistry, biochemistry, and pharmacology is the rate or speed at which a ligand dissociates from a protein, for instance, a receptor. It is an important factor in the binding affinity and intrinsic activity (efficacy) of a ligand at a receptor. The dissociation rate for a particular substrate can be applied to enzyme kinetics, including the Michaelis-Menten model. Substrate dissociation rate contributes to how large or small the enzyme velocity will be. In the Michaelis-Menten model, the enzyme binds to the substrate yielding an enzyme substrate complex, which can either go backwards by dissociating or go forward by forming a product. The dissociation rate constant is defined using K_{off}.

The Michaelis-Menten constant is denoted by K_{m} and is represented by the equation K_{m}= (K_{off} + K_{cat})/ K_{on}. The rates that the enzyme binds and dissociates from the substrate are represented by K_{on} and K_{off} respectively. K_{m} is also defined as the substrate concentration at which enzymatic velocity reaches half of its maximal rate. The tighter a ligand binds to a substrate, the lower the dissociation rate will be. K_{m} and K_{off} are proportional, thus at higher levels of dissociation, the Michaelis-Menten constant will be larger.

Direct measurements using electrospray ionization mass spectrometry (ESI-MS) have quantified dissociation rate constants for high-affinity ligand-protein interactions, such as the biotin-streptavidin system, offering a deeper understanding of enzyme-substrate dynamics. Recent computational studies have provided insights into the diffusional processes that influence the dissociation rates of bio-molecular complexes, highlighting the importance of molecular movement and binding specificity in these interactions, the importance is considering both the physical movement of molecules and their binding specificities when analyzing dissociation rates.
