= Dynamic energy budget theory =

Ecological mathematical model of metabolism

The dynamic energy budget (DEB) theory is a formal metabolic theory which provides a single quantitative framework to dynamically describe the aspects of metabolism (energy and mass budgets) of all living organisms at the individual level, based on assumptions about energy uptake, storage, and utilization of various substances. The DEB theory adheres to stringent thermodynamic principles, is motivated by universally observed patterns, is non-species specific, and links different levels of biological organization (cells, organisms, and populations) as prescribed by the implications of energetics. Models based on the DEB theory have been successfully applied to over 1000 species with real-life applications ranging from conservation, aquaculture, general ecology, and ecotoxicology (see also the Add-my-pet collection). The theory is contributing to the theoretical underpinning of the emerging field of metabolic ecology.

The explicitness of the assumptions and the resulting predictions enable testing against a wide variety of experimental results at the various levels of biological organization. The theory explains many general observations, such as the body size scaling relationships of certain physiological traits, and provides a theoretical underpinning to the widely used method of indirect calorimetry. Several popular empirical models are special cases of the DEB model, or very close numerical approximations.

== Theoretical background ==
The theory presents simple mechanistic rules that describe the uptake and allocation of energy (and nutrients) and the consequences for physiological organization throughout an organism's life cycle, including the relationships of energetics with aging and effects of toxicants. Assumptions of the DEB theory are delineated in an explicit way, the approach clearly distinguishes mechanisms associated with intra‐ and interspecific variation in metabolic rates, and equations for energy flows are mathematically derived following the principles of physics and simplicity.

Cornerstones of the theory are:

- conservation of mass, energy and time,
- relationships between surface area and volume
- stoichiometric constraints on production
- organizational uncoupling of metabolic modules (assimilation, dissipation, growth)
- strong and weak homeostasis (composition of compartments is constant; composition of the organism is constant when the food is constant)
- substrate(s) from the environment is/are first converted to reserve(s) before being used for further metabolism

The theory specifies that an organism is made up two main compartments: (energy) reserve and structure. Assimilation of energy is proportional to surface area of the structure, and maintenance is proportional to its volume. Reserve does not require maintenance. Energy mobilization will depend on the relative amount of the energy reserve, and on the interface between reserve and structure. Once mobilized, the energy is split into two branches:

- a fixed proportion (termed kappa, κ) is allocated to growth (increase of structural mass) and maintenance of structure, while
- the remaining proportion (1- κ) is allocated to processes of maturation (increase in complexity, installation of regulation systems, preparation for reproduction) and maintaining the level of attained maturity (including, e.g., maintenance of defense systems).

The κ-rule therefore states that the processes of growth and maturation do not directly compete. Maintenance needs to be paid before allocating energy to other processes.

In the context of energy acquisition and allocation, the theory recognizes three main developmental stages: embryo, which does not feed or reproduce, juvenile, which feeds but does not reproduce, and adult, which both feeds and is allocating energy to reproduction. Transitions between these life stages occur at events specified as birth and puberty, which are reached when energy invested into maturation (tracked as 'level of maturity') reaches a certain threshold. Maturity does not increase in the adult stage, and maturity maintenance is proportional to maturity.

Biochemical composition of reserve and structure is considered to be that of generalised compounds, and is constant (the assumption of strong homeostasis) but not necessarily identical. Biochemical transformation from food to reserve (assimilation), and from reserve to structure (growth) include overhead costs. These overheads, together with processes of somatic and maturity maintenance and reproduction overheads (inefficiencies in transformation from reserve to reproductive material), all contribute to the consumption of oxygen and production of carbon dioxide, i.e. metabolism.

== DEB models ==
All dynamic energy budget models follow the energy budget of an individual organism throughout its life cycle; by contrast,"static" energy budget models describe a specific life stage or size of an organism. The main advantage of the DEB-theory based model over most other models is its description of energy assimilation and utilization (reserve dynamics) simultaneously with decoupled processes of growth, development/ maturation, and maintenance. Under constant environmental conditions (constant food and temperature) the standard DEB model can be simplified to the von Bertalanffy (or better, Putter's) growth model, but its mechanistic process-based setup enables incorporating fluctuating environmental conditions, as well as studying reproduction and maturation in parallel to growth.

DEB theory specifies reserves as separate from structure: these are the two state variables that contribute to physical volume, and (in combination with reproduction buffer of adults) fully define the size of an individual. Maturity (also a state variable of the model) tracks how much energy has been invested into maturation, and therefore determines the life stage of the organism relative to maturity levels at which life stage transitions (birth and puberty) occur. Dynamics of the state variables are given by ordinary differential equations which include the major processes of energy uptake and use: assimilation, mobilization, maintenance, growth, maturation, and reproduction.

- Food is transformed into reserve, which fuels all other metabolic processes. The feeding rate is proportional to the surface area; food handling time and the transformation efficiency from food to reserve are independent of food density.
- A fixed fraction (kappa) of mobilized reserve is allocated to somatic maintenance plus growth (soma), the rest on maturity maintenance plus maturation or reproduction. Maintenance has priority over other processes. Somatic maintenance is proportional to structural body volume, and maturity maintenance to maturity. Heating costs for endotherms and osmotic work (for fresh water organisms) are somatic maintenance costs that are proportional to surface area.
- Stage transitions occur if the cumulated investment into maturation exceeds threshold values. Life stages typically are: embryo, juvenile, and adult. Reserve that is allocated to reproduction is first accumulated in a buffer. The rules for converting the buffer to gametes are species-specific (e.g. spawning can be once per season).

Parameters of the model are individual specific, but similarities between individuals of the same species yield species-specific parameter estimations. DEB parameters are estimated from several types of data simultaneously. Routines for data entry and parameter estimation are available as free software package DEBtool implemented in the MATLAB environment, with the process of model construction explained in a Wiki-style manual. Estimated parameters are collected in the online library called the Add-my-pet project.

=== The standard DEB model ===
The standard model quantifies the metabolism of an isomorph (organism that does not change in shape during ontogeny) that feeds on one type of food with a constant composition (therefore the weak homeostasis applies, i.e. the chemical composition of the body is constant). The state variables of the individual are 1 reserve, 1 structure, maturity, and (in the adult stage) the reproduction buffer. Parameter values are constant throughout life. The reserve density at birth equals that of the mother at egg formation. Foetuses develop similarly, but receive unrestricted amount of reserve from the mother during development.

=== Extensions of the standard model ===
DEB theory has been extended into many directions, such as

- effects of changes in shape during growth (e.g. V1-morphs and V0-morphs)
- non-standard embryo->juvenile->adult transitions, for example in holometabolic insects
- inclusion of more types of food (substrate), which requires synthesizing units to model
- inclusion of more reserves (which is necessary for organisms that do not feed on other organisms) and more structures (which is necessary to deal with plants), or a simplified version of the model (DEBkiss) applicable in ecotoxicology
- the formation and excretion of metabolic products (which is a basis for syntrophic relationships, and useful in biotechnology)
- the production of free radicals (linked to size and nutritional status) and their effect on survival (aging)
- the growth of body parts (including tumours)
- effects of chemical compounds (toxicants) on parameter values and the hazard rate (which is useful to establish no effect concentrations for environmental risk assessment): the DEBtox method
- processes of adaptation (gene expression) to the availability of substrates (important in biodegradation)

== Criticism ==
The main criticism is directed to the formal presentation of the theory (heavy mathematical jargon), number of listed parameters, the symbol heavy notation, and the fact that modeled (state) variables and parameters are abstract quantities which cannot be directly measured, all making it less likely to reach its intended audience (ecologists) and be an "efficient" theory.

However, more recent publications aim to present the DEB theory in an "easier to digest" content to "bridge the ecology-mathematics gap". List of parameters is a direct result of list of processes which are of interest—if only growth under constant food and temperature is of interest, the standard DEB model can be simplified to the von Bertalanffy growth curve. Adding more processes into focus (such as reproduction and/or maturation), and forcing the model with fluctuating (dynamic) environmental conditions, needless to say, will result in more parameters.

The general methodology of estimation of DEB parameters from data is described in van der Meer 2006; Kooijman et al 2008 shows which particular compound parameters can be estimated from a few simple observations at a single food density and how an increasing number of parameters can be estimated if more quantities are observed at several food densities. A natural sequence exists in which parameters can be known in principle. In addition, routines for data entry and scripts for parameter estimation are available as a free and documented software package DEBtool, aiming to provide a ready-to-use tool for users with less mathematical and programing background. Number of parameters, also pointed as relatively sparse for a bioenergetic model, vary depending on the main application and, because the whole life cycle of an organism is defined, the overall number of parameters per data-set ratio is relatively low. Linking the DEB (abstract) and measured properties is done by simple mathematical operations which include auxiliary parameters (also defined by the DEB theory and included in the DEBtool routines), and include also switching between energy-time and mass-time contexts. Add my pet (AmP) project explores parameter pattern values across taxa. The DEB notation is a result of combining the symbols from the main fields of science (biology, chemistry, physics, mathematics) used in the theory, while trying to keep the symbols consistent. As the symbols themselves contain a fair bit of information (see DEB notation document), they are kept in most of the DEB literature.

== Compatibility (and applicability) of DEB theory/models with other approaches ==
Dynamic energy budget theory presents a quantitative framework of metabolic organization common to all life forms, which could help to understand evolution of metabolic organization since the origin of life. As such, it has a common aim with the other widely used metabolic theory: the West-Brown-Enquist (WBE) metabolic theory of ecology, which prompted side-by-side analysis of the two approaches. Though the two theories can be regarded as complementary to an extent, they were built on different assumptions and have different scope of applicability. In addition to a more general applicability, the DEB theory does not suffer from consistency issues pointed out for the WBE theory.

=== Applications ===
- Add my pet (AmP) project is a collection of DEB models for over 1000 species, and explores patterns in parameter values across taxa. Routines for parameter exploration are available in AmPtool.
- Models based on DEB theory can be linked to more traditional bioenergetic models without deviating from the underlying assumptions. This allows comparison and testing of model performance .
- A DEB-module (physiological model based on DEB theory) was successfully applied to reconstruct and predict physiological responses of individuals under environmental constraints
- A DEB-module is also featured in the eco-toxicological mechanistic models (DEBtox implementation]) for modeling the sublethal effects of toxicants (e.g., change in reproduction or growth rate)
- Generality of the approach and applicability of the same mathematical framework to organisms of different species and life stages enables inter- and intra-species comparisons on the basis of parameter values, and theoretical/empirical exploration of patterns in parameter values in the evolutionary context, focusing for example on development, energy utilization in a specific environment, reproduction, comparative energetics, and toxicological sensitivity linked to metabolic rates.
- Studying patterns in body size scaling relationships: The assumptions of the model quantify all energy and mass fluxes in an organism (including heat, dioxygen, carbon dioxide, ammonia) while avoiding using the allometric relationships. In addition, same parameters describe same processes across species: for example, heating costs of endotherms (proportional to surface area) are regarded separate to volume-linked metabolic costs of both ectotherms and endotherms, and cost of growth, even though they all contribute to metabolism of the organism. Rules for the co-variation of parameter values across species are implied by model assumptions, and the parameter values can be directly compared without dimensional inconsistencies which might be linked to allometric parameters. Any eco-physiological quantity that can be written as function of DEB parameters which co-vary with size can, for this reason, also be written as function of the maximum body size.
- DEB theory provides constraints on the metabolic organisation of sub-cellular processes. Together with rules for interaction between individuals (competition, syntrophy, prey-predator relationships), it also provides a basis to understand population and ecosystem dynamics.

Many more examples of applications have been published in scientific literature.

== See also ==
- Metabolic ecology
- Comparative physiology
- Evolutionary physiology
- Metabolic theory of ecology
- Power law (also known as a scaling law), Allometry
