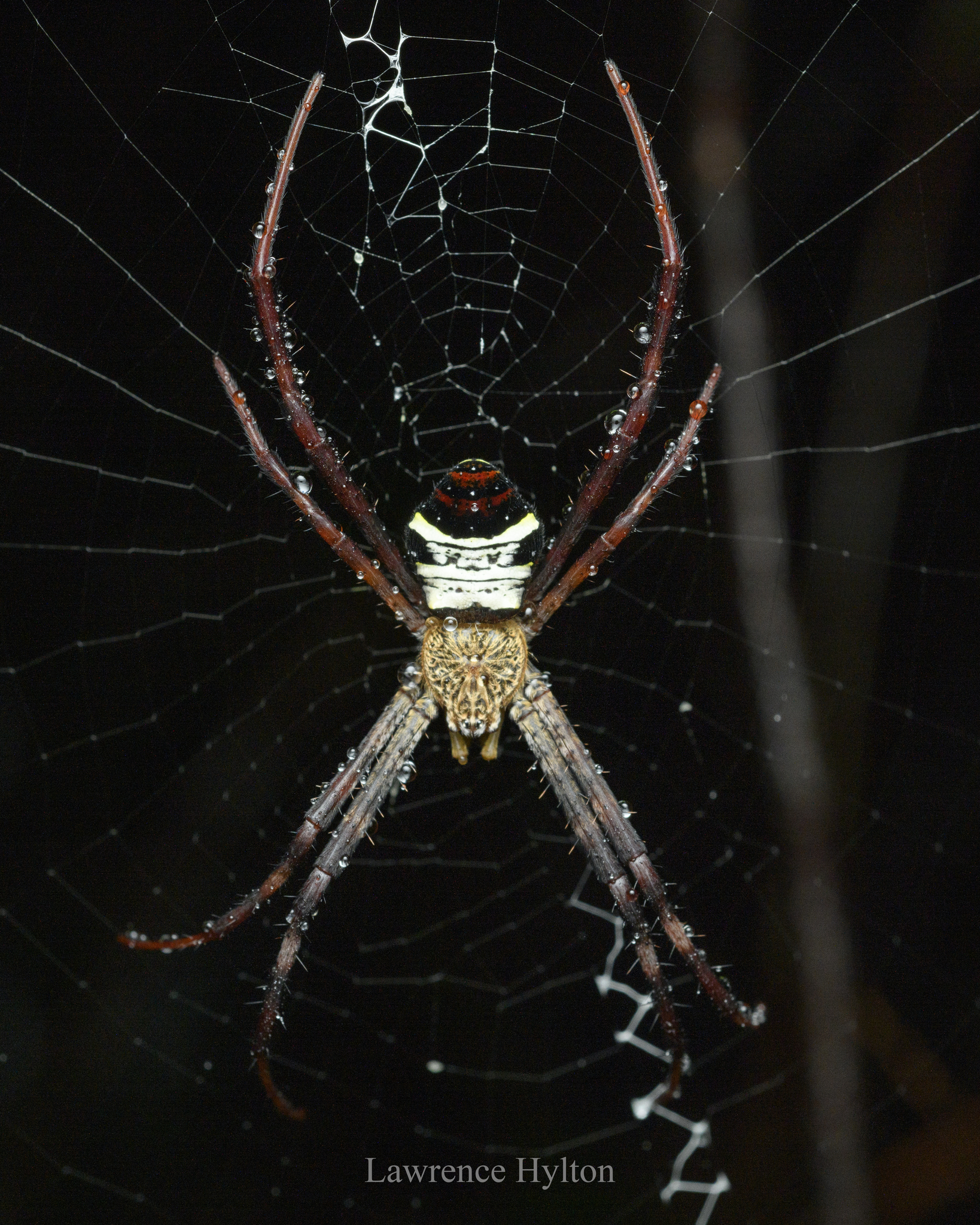
- female from Hong Kong

Scientific classification
- Kingdom: Animalia
- Phylum: Arthropoda
- Subphylum: Chelicerata
- Class: Arachnida
- Order: Araneae
- Infraorder: Araneomorphae
- Family: Araneidae
- Genus: Argiope
- Species: A. vietnamensis

Binomial name
- Argiope vietnamensis Ono, 2010

= Argiope vietnamensis =

Species of spider

Argiope vietnamensis is a species of orb-weaver spider in the genus Argiope. It was first described by Ono in 2010 from specimens collected in Vietnam. The species is known from China and Vietnam.

== Taxonomy ==
Argiope vietnamensis was described in 2010 by Ono based on female specimens from Vietnam. The male was subsequently described by Wang, Gan & Mi in 2021 from specimens collected in China.

== Distribution ==
A. vietnamensis has been recorded from China (Guangxi and Guizhou provinces) and Vietnam. In Vietnam, it was originally found near Bach Ma National Park in Thừa Thiên Huế Province at elevations of 400–500 meters. Chinese populations have been documented from various locations including Shiwan Dashan (十万大山, Ten Thousand Mountains) National Forest Park and Maolan National Nature Reserve.

== Description ==
Argiope vietnamensis is a relatively large orb weaver spider. Females are considerably larger than males, with a total body length of 22.5 mm compared to the male's 5.2 mm.

The female has a distinctive trapezoidal abdomen with a pair of small bumps at the front sides. The upper surface of the abdomen lacks the dark bands typically found in related species, instead displaying a coloration that transitions from white at the front to light yellow in the middle and brown at the rear. The underside is strikingly marked with black and white bands and spots, featuring three pairs of white spots against a black background. In living specimens, the carapace appears silver-white and the abdomen is white with black markings.

The male is much smaller with a shield-shaped abdomen that is brown, being paler at the front and darker toward the rear. The carapace is yellow-brown and covered with short thin hairs.

The species can be distinguished from similar Asian species like A. minuta and A. katherina by the smaller depressions in the female's reproductive structures and differences in the shape of associated features. Males can be identified by their reproductive organs, particularly the structure of the median apophysis which is divided into two branches, with the inner branch bearing a short spur, and the embolus being completely visible when viewed from the side.
