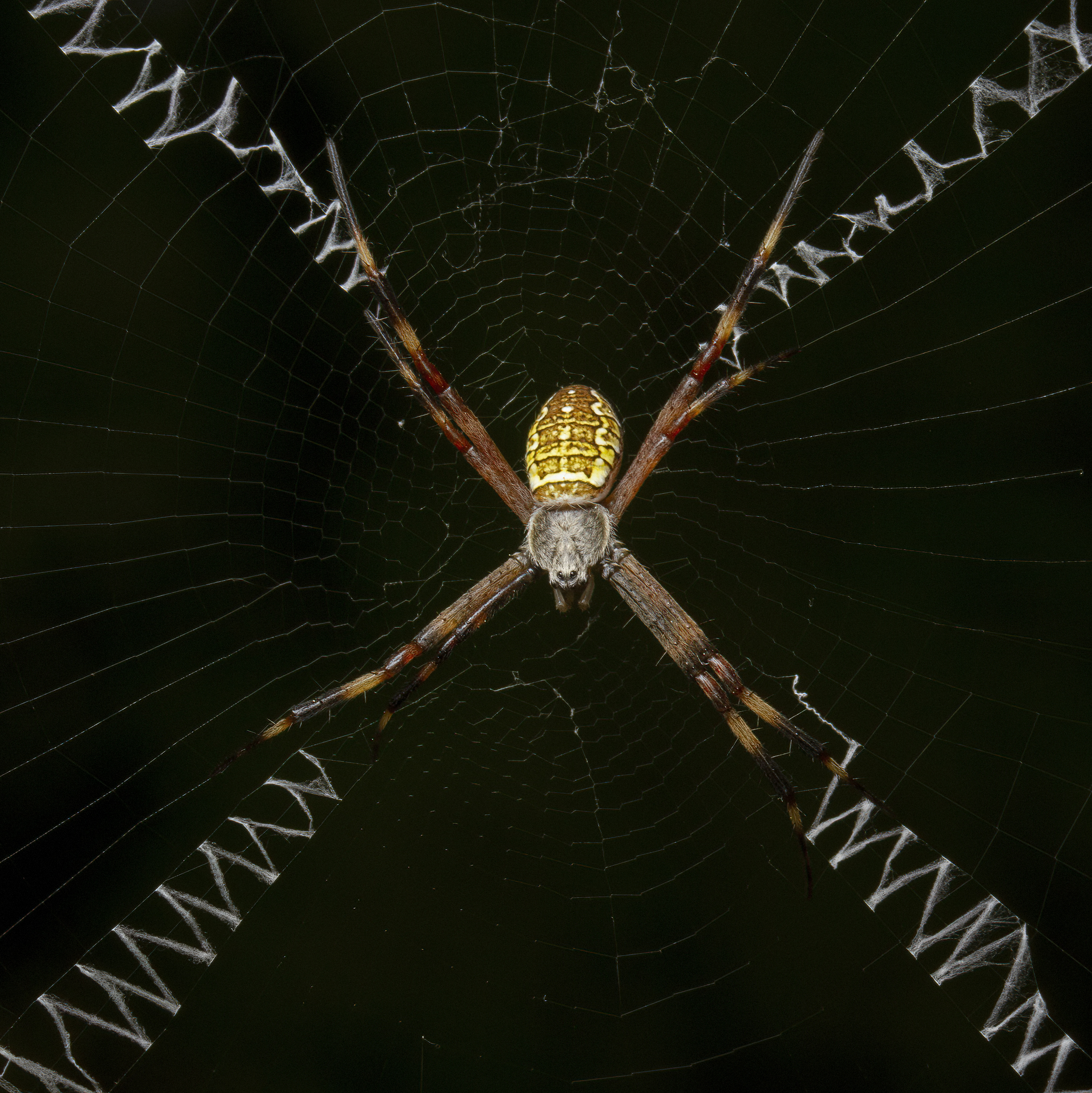
- Adult, Litchfield National Park, NT

Scientific classification
- Domain: Eukaryota
- Kingdom: Animalia
- Phylum: Arthropoda
- Subphylum: Chelicerata
- Class: Arachnida
- Order: Araneae
- Infraorder: Araneomorphae
- Family: Araneidae
- Genus: Argiope
- Species: A. katherina

Binomial name
- Argiope katherina Levi, 1983

= Argiope katherina =

Species of spider

Argiope katherina is a species of orb-weaver spider found in the northern parts of the Northern Territory and Western Australia. It was first described by Levi in 1983 and was named for Katherine Gorge. Specimens had been found at the mouth of split rock crevices up to one hundred metres from the Katherine River in sparse Pandanus-dominated territory.

== Description ==
Argiope katherina rests with its legs in four pairs on a web that often has zig-zag web decorations consisting of one to four radials. The carapace is brown covered with a light coloured down. The sternum is black with a median longitudinal mark. The abdomen has a distinctive reticulate pattern outlined with white zig-zag margins at the edges, and three or four prominent white dots on the mid-line. Females are larger than males, with adult females up to 16 mm and males 6 mm. Similar looking species are Argiope mascordi and Argiope dietrichae.

== Gallery ==
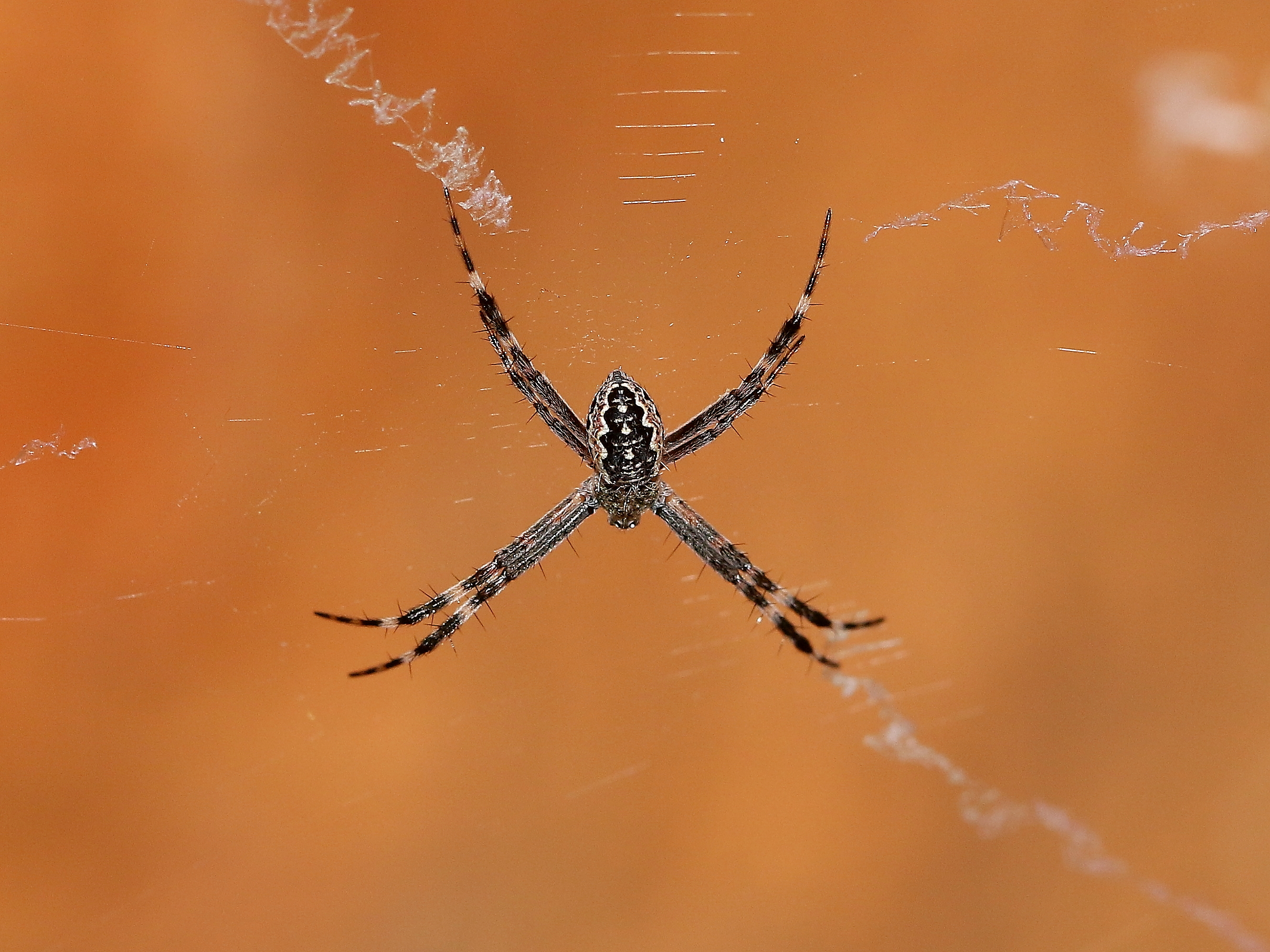
Juvenile at Katherine Gorge

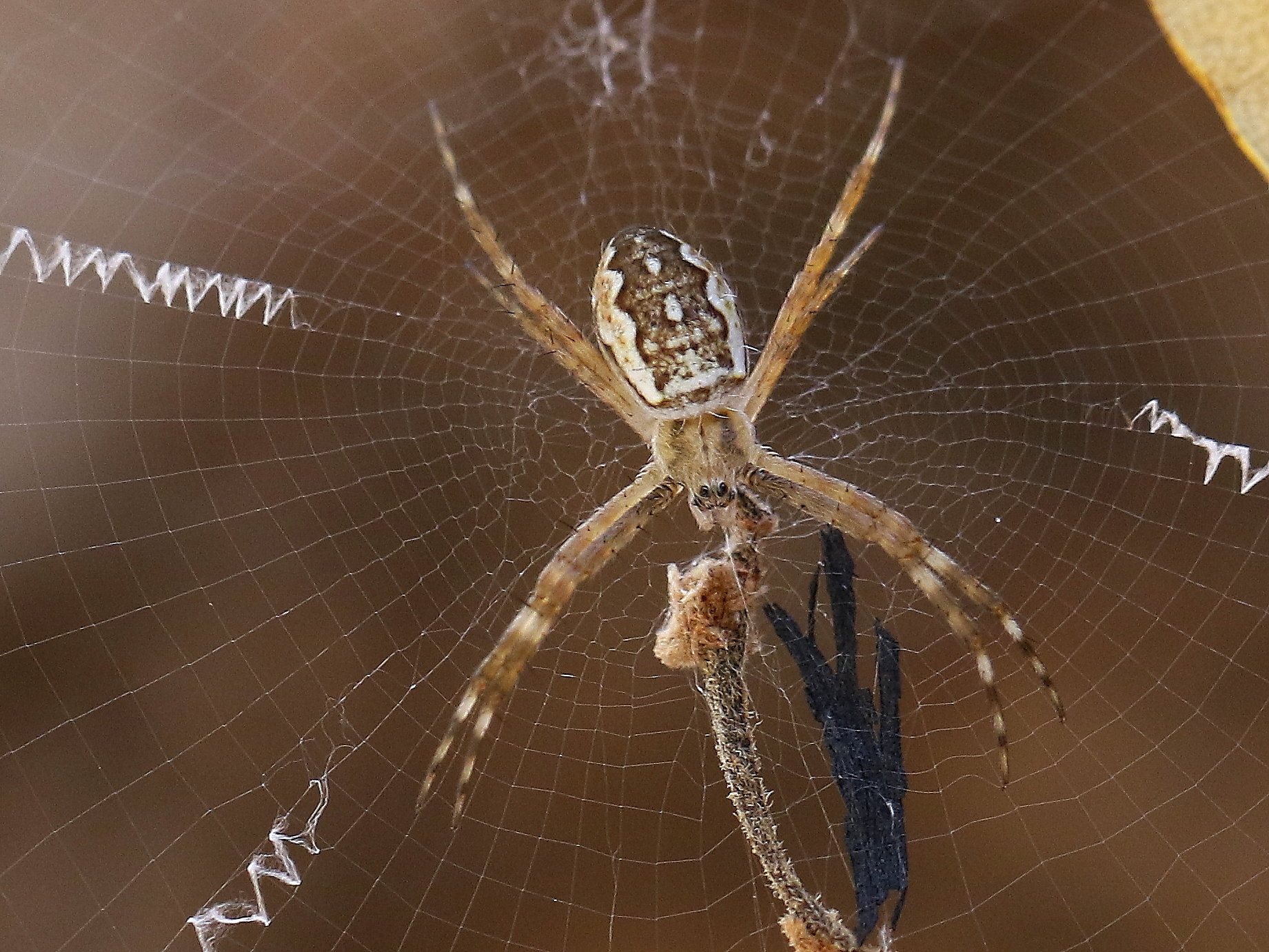
Juvenile at Katherine Gorge

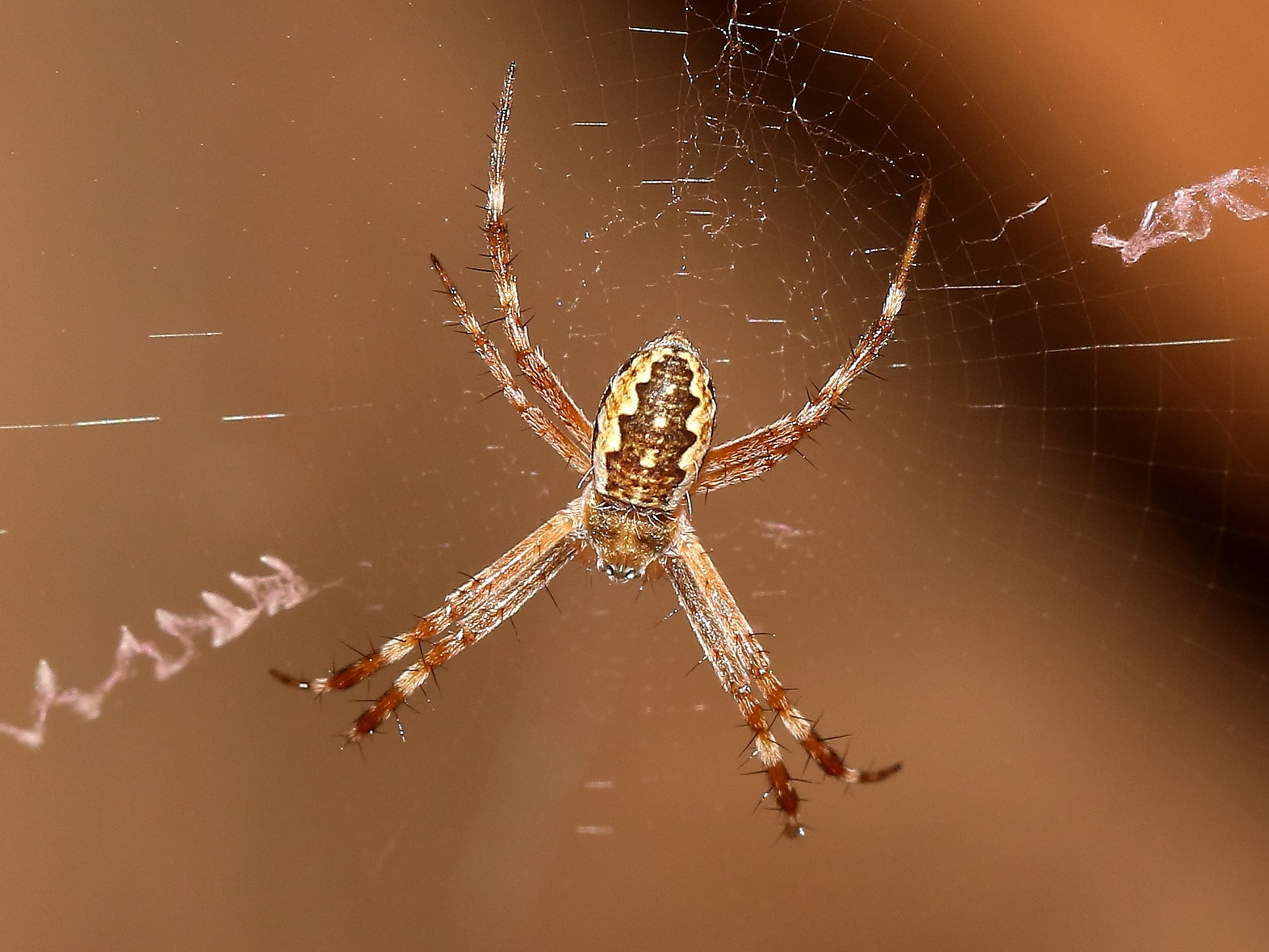
Juvenile at Katherine Gorge
