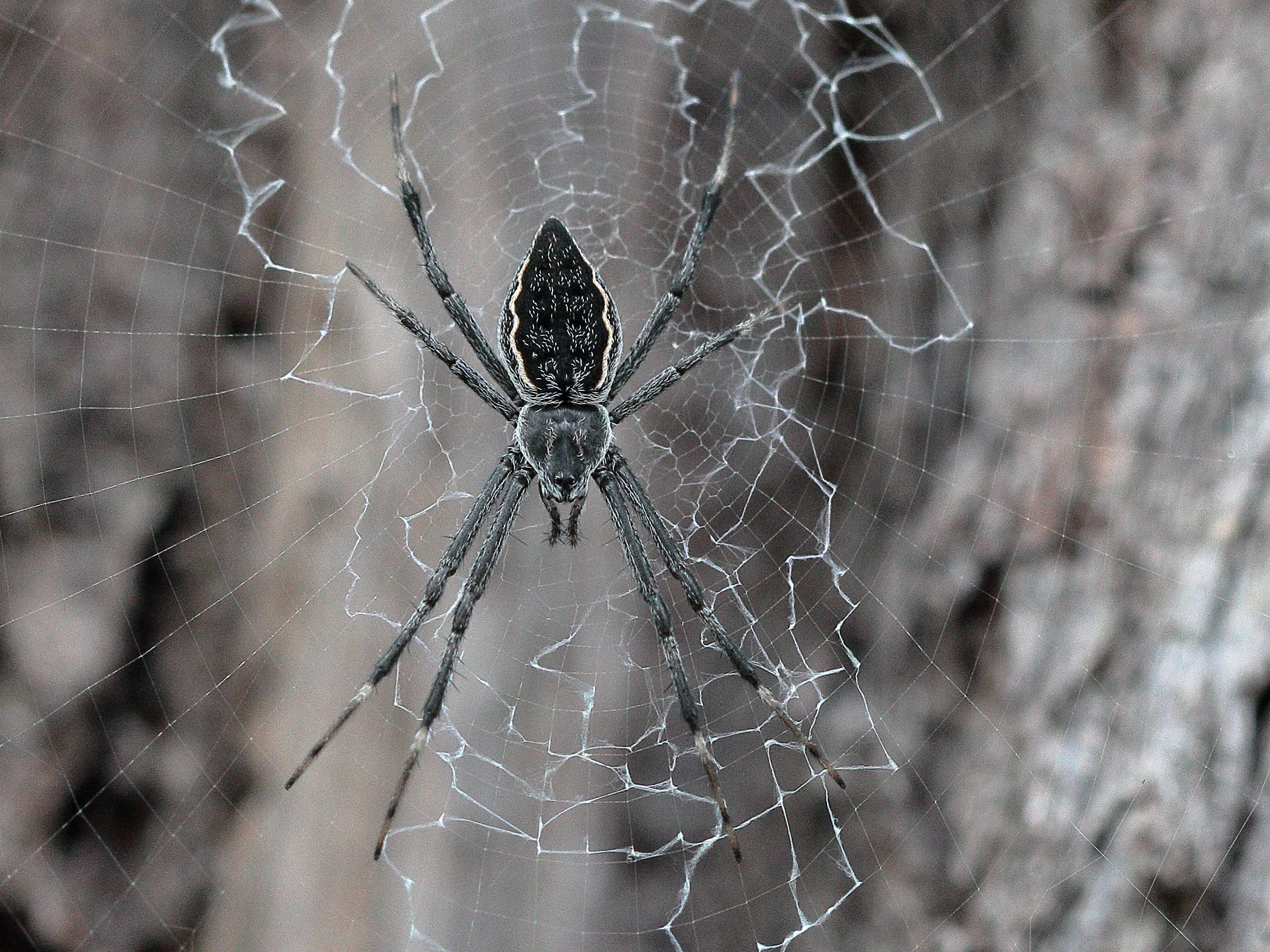
- Female Queensland, Australia

Scientific classification
- Domain: Eukaryota
- Kingdom: Animalia
- Phylum: Arthropoda
- Subphylum: Chelicerata
- Class: Arachnida
- Order: Araneae
- Infraorder: Araneomorphae
- Family: Araneidae
- Genus: Argiope
- Species: A. ocyaloides

Binomial name
- Argiope ocyaloides L. Koch, 1871

= Argiope ocyaloides =

Species of spider

Argiope ocyaloides is a species of orb-web spider found in Queensland, Australia. It is commonly known as bark-hugging St Andrews cross spider. Argiope ocyaloides can be found in crevices of dark coloured bark on eucalypt, acacia, or similar trees. It is smaller than most other species of Argiope and is dark brown to black in colour. The abdomen of Argiope ocyaloides is long with a pointed tip whereas the similar species Argiope mascordi has a shorter abdomen with rounded tip.

== Gallery ==
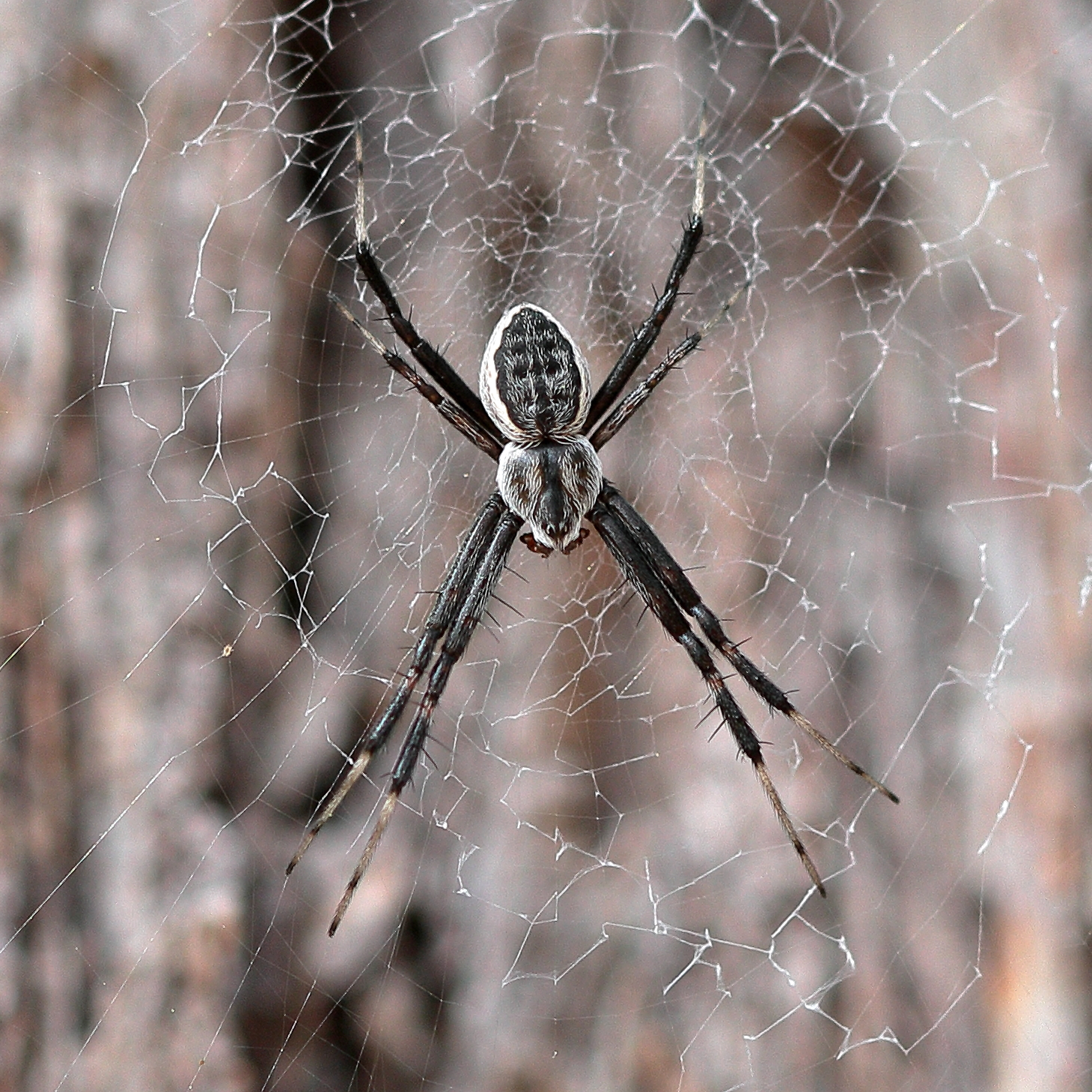
Male, north Queensland

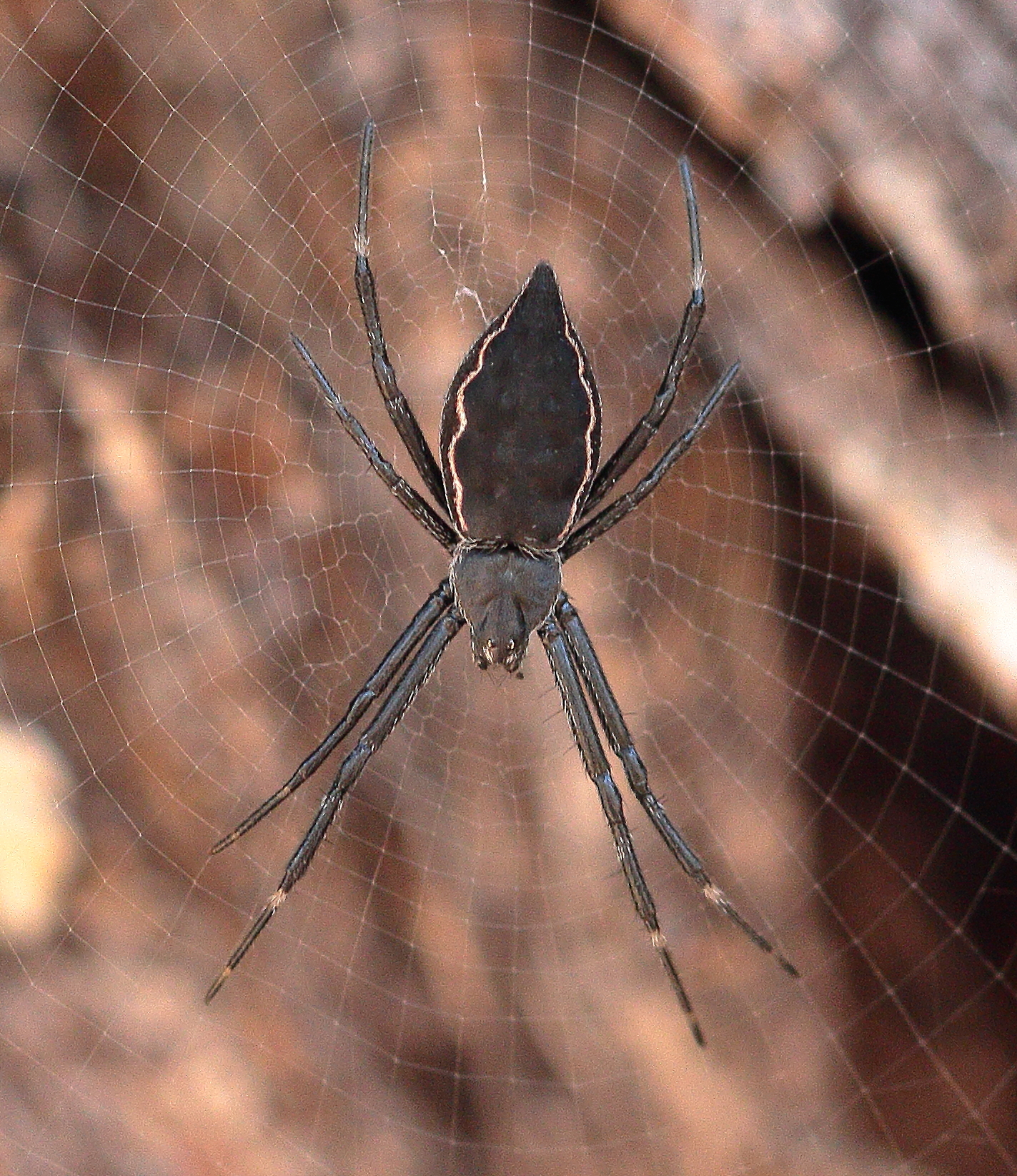
Colour variation in a female, north Queensland
