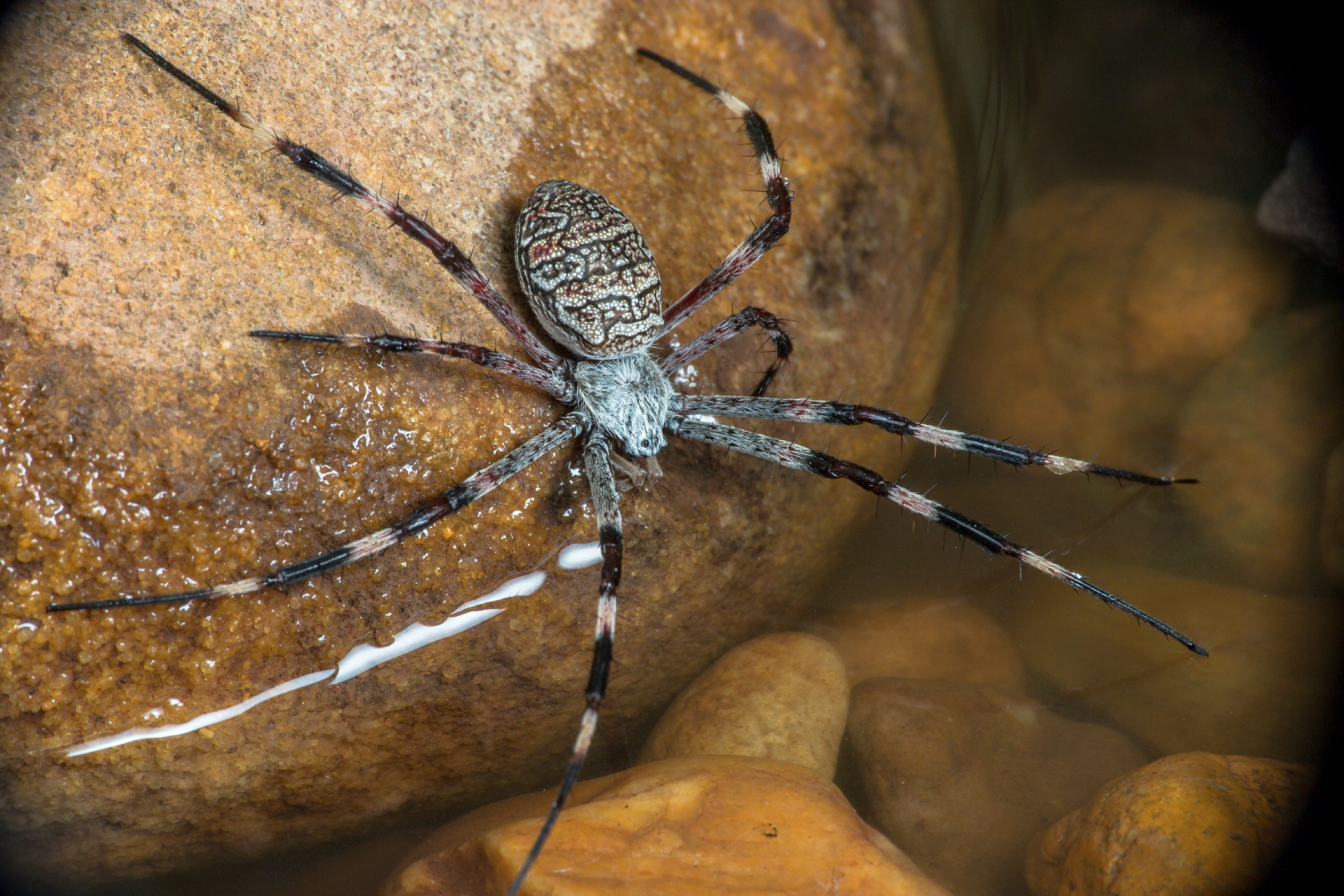
- Female in Western Australia

Scientific classification
- Domain: Eukaryota
- Kingdom: Animalia
- Phylum: Arthropoda
- Subphylum: Chelicerata
- Class: Arachnida
- Order: Araneae
- Infraorder: Araneomorphae
- Family: Araneidae
- Genus: Argiope
- Species: A. dietrichae

Binomial name
- Argiope dietrichae Levi, 1983

= Argiope dietrichae =

Species of spider

Argiope dietrichae is a rare species of orb-web spider found in the northern parts of Western Australia and the Northern Territory. It was first described by Levi in 1983, and it was named for Amalie Dietrich who collected specimens for the Godeffroy Museum in Hamburg.

== Description ==
Argiope dietrichae rest on their web head down with legs arranged in four sets of two. They have a brown carapace streaked with light coloured down. The abdomen has a tessellated pattern similar to Argiope katherina but differs ventrally by a narrower rim and septum of the epigyne. The sternum has a median posterior white mark. The legs are light brown with darker spots and bands. Females are larger than males, with adult females up to 13 mm and males 6 mm.
