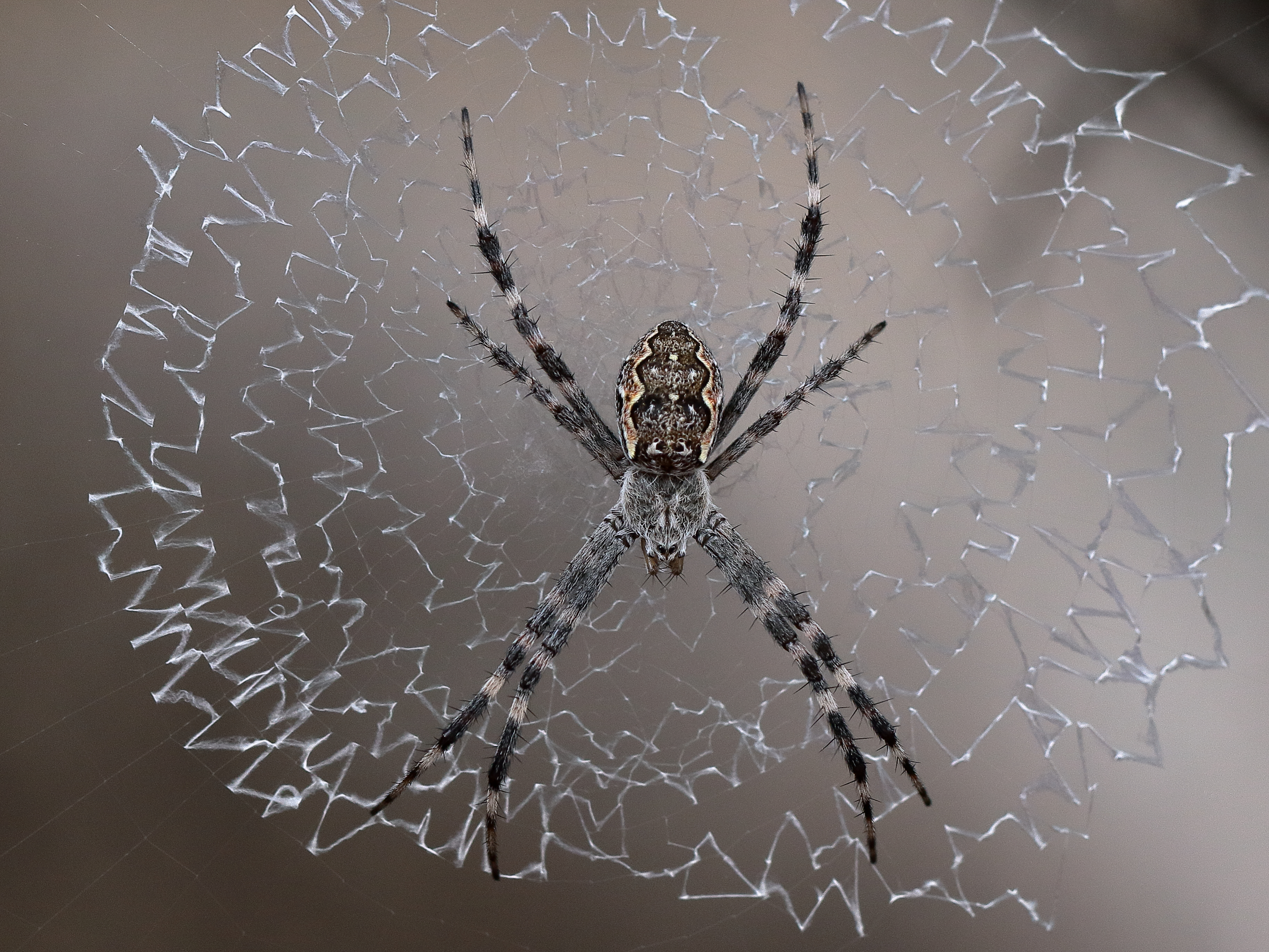
- Adult female

Scientific classification
- Kingdom: Animalia
- Phylum: Arthropoda
- Subphylum: Chelicerata
- Class: Arachnida
- Order: Araneae
- Infraorder: Araneomorphae
- Family: Araneidae
- Genus: Argiope
- Species: A. mascordi

Binomial name
- Argiope mascordi Levi, 1983

= Argiope mascordi =

Species of spider

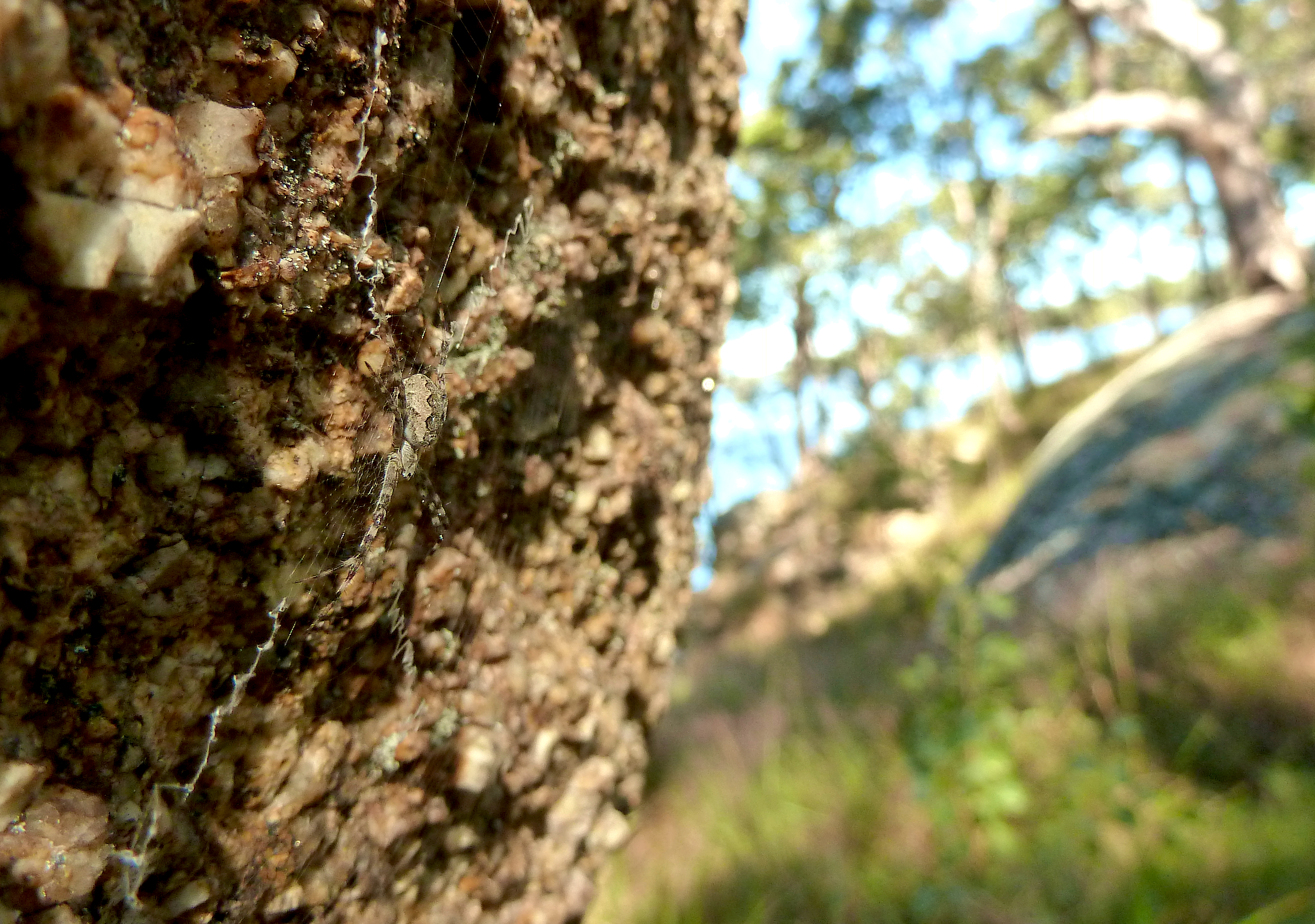
Adult female with cruciate web decoration on a rock. Picture taken at Lake Tinaroo, Queensland, Australia

Argiope mascordi is a species of orb-web spider found in Queensland, Australia. The females of this species are smaller, and males relatively larger than in many other Argiope. Individuals are generally less colourful than many other spiders in the genus Argiope. However, individual colour tones range from cream-white, over reddish to almost black. These orb weavers construct their webs predominantly on the surface of rocks, close to bodies of water. Web decorations in this species are interesting in that A. mascordi constructs both cruciate and circular patterns. While circular web decorations (stabilimenta) are typical for juvenile spiders in other Argiope species, adults of A. mascordi continue to build those as adults (similar to A. ocyaloides or A. chloreis). Both patterns can be built by the same individual and may be switched in consecutive webs. Circular decorations are more common (3/4) than cruciate forms (1/4) in this species.The reason for switching between patterns remains unknown.

== Gallery ==
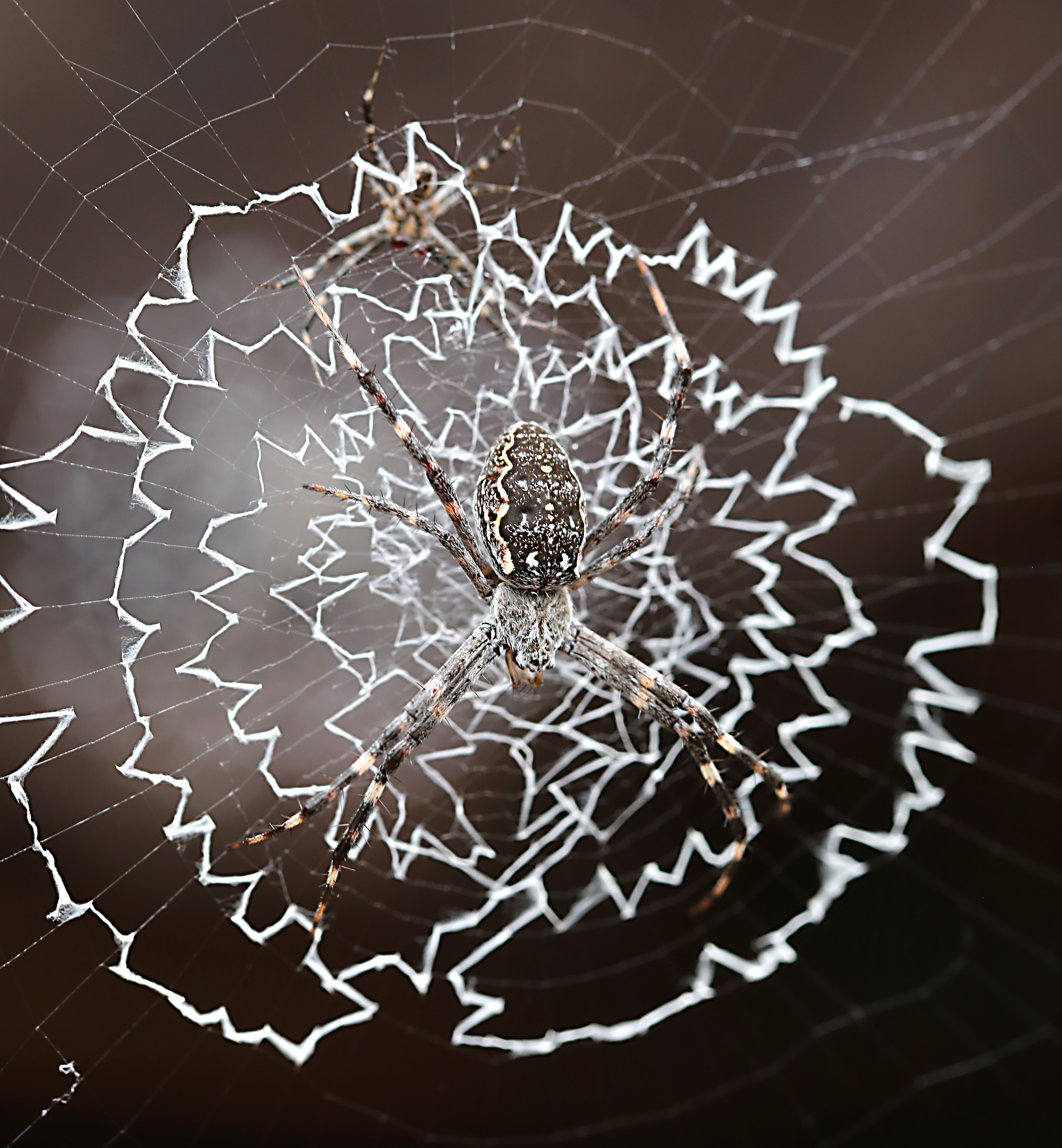
Adult female with circular stabilimentum (web decoration) and male at the top left behind the web

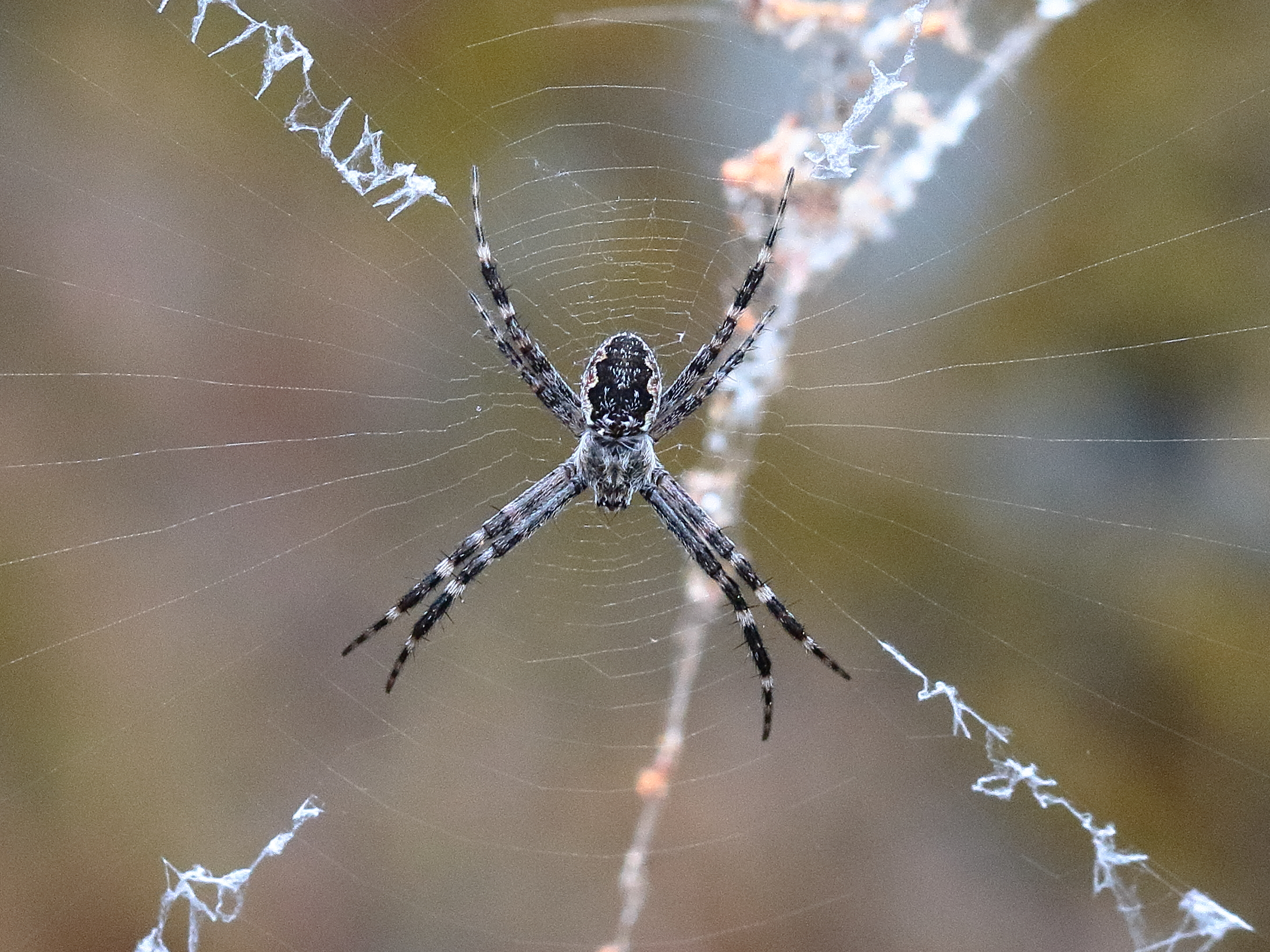
Female with cruciate stabilimentum

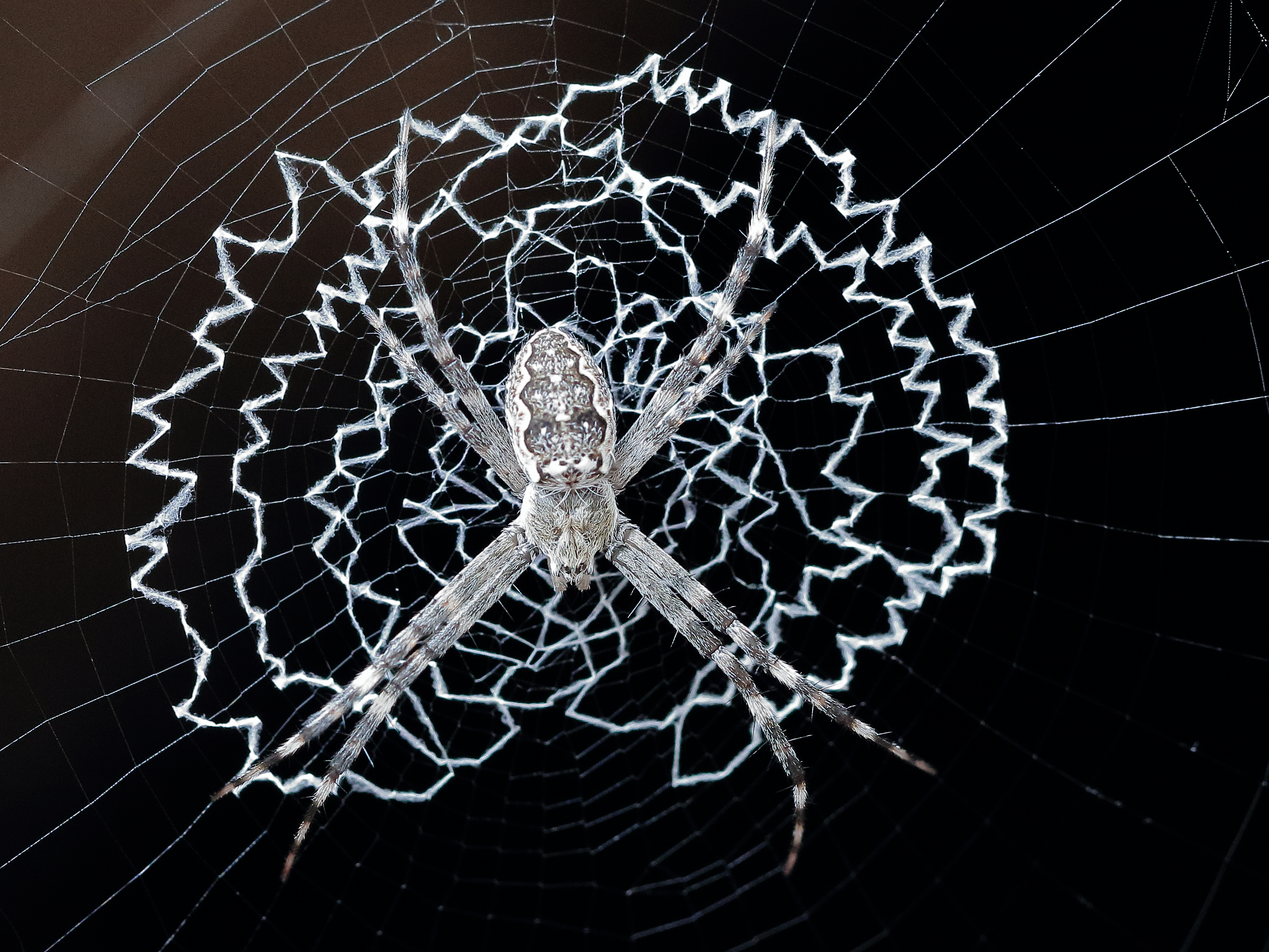
Female with circular web decoration north Queensland

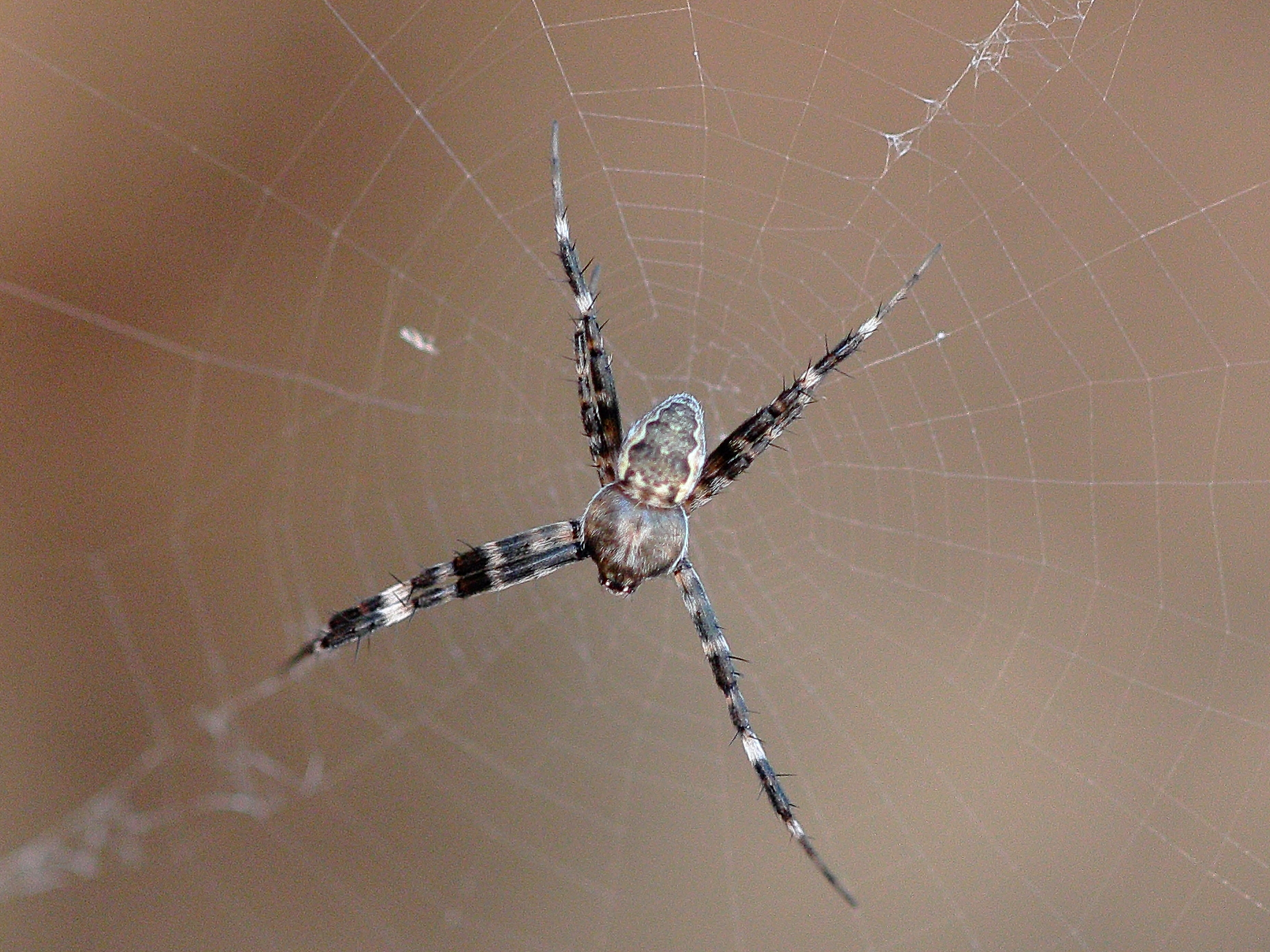
Male
