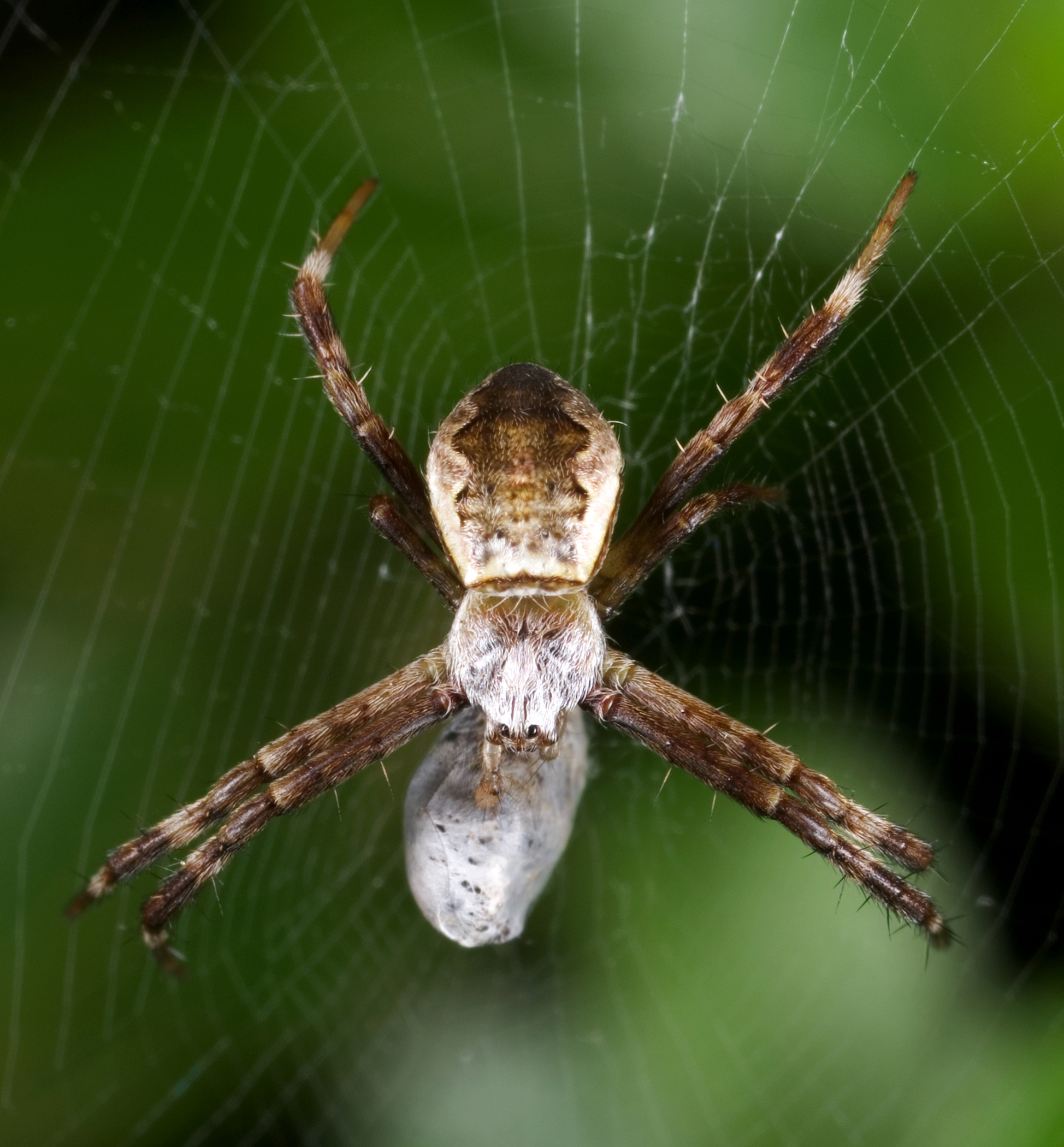
- female in web

Scientific classification
- Kingdom: Animalia
- Phylum: Arthropoda
- Subphylum: Chelicerata
- Class: Arachnida
- Order: Araneae
- Infraorder: Araneomorphae
- Family: Araneidae
- Genus: Argiope
- Species: A. minuta

Binomial name
- Argiope minuta Karsch, 1879

Synonyms
- Argiope shillongensis Sinha, 1952

= Argiope minuta =

Small Cross Spider

Species of spider

Argiope minuta is a species of spider of the genus Argiope. It is found across East Asia and South Asia, including India, Bangladesh, China, Taiwan, Korea, and Japan.

== Etymology ==
The specific epithet minuta means "small" in Latin, referring to the spider's smaller size compared to related species in the genus.

== Distribution ==
A. minuta has been recorded from India, Bangladesh, China, Taiwan, Korea, and Japan. According to Bösenberg and Strand, specimens were collected at Saga, Kompira, and Nagasaki.

== Description ==
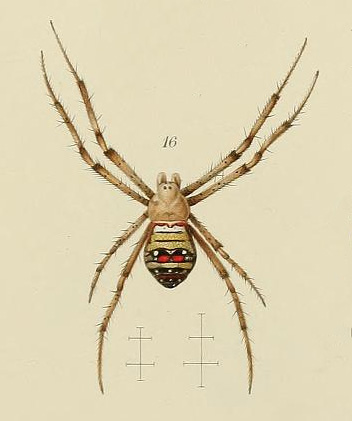
drawing of female from 1906 article

Argiope minuta displays marked sexual dimorphism, with females (6-12 mm total length) being significantly larger than males (4 mm).

In living specimens, these spiders are very colorful, with the extremities being light brown. The entire body surface is finely granulated, visible only under strong magnification. The brown cephalothorax is covered with silky, forward-directed long hairs that curve in an arc-like manner over the eye region. The sternum is black with a broad yellow median stripe and few black hairs.

Notable are three pairs of hill-like colored abdominal segments, with the last pair being yellow and forming a kind of cross with the yellow median stripe. The lip region is purely yellow, and the maxillae are yellowish at the margins. The legs display the usual dark rings and abundant black spines. The pedipalp claw is quite slender with nine side teeth.

The bald opisthosoma is covered in places with crowded, standing white silk hairs that produce silver spots. The yellow and brown stripes are created by small, crowded, standing, translucent pigment spots that are recognizable to the naked eye. At the black spots, the ground appears to have this color.

The anterior abdominal covering is white with orange-red upper margin. In front of the pointed extended corners stands a black transverse line, behind it a white, then a yellow transverse band bordered by a black line. This is followed by a white band with three yellow spots adjacent behind it.

Like other Argiope species, A. minuta constructs orb webs with a hanging net forming a cross with four zigzag bands.
