= Charlotte's Web (1973 film) =

1973 animated film

- Theatrical release poster
- Directed by: Charles A. Nichols; Iwao Takamoto
- Story by: Earl Hamner Jr.
- Based on: Charlotte's Web by E. B. White
- Produced by: Joseph Barbera; William Hanna
- Starring: Debbie Reynolds; Paul Lynde; Henry Gibson
- Edited by: Larry C. Cowan; Pat Foley
- Music by: The Sherman Brothers (songs); Irwin Kostal (score)
- Production companies: Hanna-Barbera Productions; Sagittarius Productions
- Distributed by: Paramount Pictures
- Release dates: February 22, 1973 (Radio City Music Hall); March 1, 1973 (United States)
- Running time: 94 minutes
- Country: United States
- Language: English
- Box office: $2.4 million (rentals)

Charlotte's Web is a 1973 American animated musical drama film based on the 1952 book of the same name by E. B. White. It was produced by Hanna-Barbera Productions and distributed by Paramount Pictures. Like the book, it centers on a pig named Wilbur who befriends an intelligent spider named Charlotte who saves him from being slaughtered.

Directed by Charles A. Nichols and Iwao Takamoto from a story by Earl Hamner Jr., it stars the voices of Debbie Reynolds, Paul Lynde, and Henry Gibson, alongside narration by Rex Allen. It features a score of music and lyrics written by the Sherman Brothers, who had previously written music for family films like Mary Poppins in 1964, The Jungle Book in 1967, and Chitty Chitty Bang Bang in 1968.

The film premiered at Radio City Music Hall on February 22, 1973, and was released on March 1 to moderate critical and commercial success. It is the first of only four Hanna-Barbera films not to be based upon one of their famous television cartoons, the other three being C.H.O.M.P.S. in 1979, Heidi's Song in 1982, and Once Upon a Forest in 1993.

== Plot ==
After Fern Arable convinces her father, John, not to slaughter the runt of a litter of piglets, John allows her to raise him as a pet, and she names him Wilbur. Six weeks later, Wilbur, now mature due to being a spring pig, is sold down the street to Fern's uncle, Homer Zuckerman. At Homer's farm, a goose coaxes a sullen Wilbur to speak his first words. Although delighted at this new ability, he still yearns for companionship. The other animals at the barn reject him, and a ram informs him that Homer is planning to slaughter him for food. A horrified Wilbur sobs before being comforted by a barn spider, who later introduces herself as Charlotte A. Cavatica and promises to come up with a plan to spare his life.

One morning, Homer's farmhand, Lurvy, sees the words SOME PIG spun within Charlotte's web. The incident attracts publicity among Homer's neighbors, who deem the praise to be a miracle. The publicity eventually dies down, and, after a hornet lands on Charlotte's web and ruins the message, she spins a new message reading TERRIFIC (at the suggestion of the goose). The incident becomes another media sensation, though Homer still desires to slaughter Wilbur. Charlotte then employs a rat named Templeton to pull a word from a magazine clipping at the dump for inspiration, and he returns with the word RADIANT ripped from a soap box to spin within her web. Following this, Homer decides to enter Wilbur in the county fair for the summer. Charlotte and Templeton reluctantly decide to accompany him. Charlotte sends Templeton to the trash pile to retrieve another word for her next message, and he returns with the word HUMBLE. The next morning, Wilbur awakens to find Charlotte has spun an egg sac containing her unborn offspring, and the following afternoon, the word HUMBLE is spun into her web. Though another pig named Uncle wins first prize, the county fair staff decides to hold a celebration in honor of Wilbur, and rewards him $25 and an engraved, bronze medal. Homer then announces that he will allow Wilbur to "live to a ripe old age".

Charlotte later informs Wilbur that she is dying and resolves to remain at the fairgrounds to do so, exhausted from laying eggs and writing words. Unwilling to abandon her children, Wilbur instructs Templeton to retrieve her egg sac to take back to the farm. Wilbur guards the egg sac through the winter, Wilbur overcame his fear of being slaughtered by Homer because he learned from Charlotte that death is just a natural part of life. The next spring, Charlotte's 514 children hatch, but fly away. Wilbur is saddened to the point of wanting to flee, but just as he is about to do so, the ram points out that three of them have stayed. Pleased at finding new friends, Wilbur names two of them Joy and Nellie; when Wilbur tells the third that Charlotte's middle initial was A, the third spider names herself Aranea. In a voiceover, a narrator explains that though Wilbur loves her children dearly, none of them could ever replace the memory of Charlotte.

== Voice cast ==
- Henry Gibson as Wilbur, a pig who was almost killed due to being the runt of the litter.
- Debbie Reynolds as Charlotte A. Cavatica, a spider who lives on a web in a corner of Homer's barn above Wilbur's pigpen.
- Paul Lynde as Templeton, a gluttonous rat who lives at Homer's farm.
- Agnes Moorehead as the Goose, an unnamed goose who is the one that encourages Wilbur to speak for the first time.
- Don Messick as:
  - Jeffrey, a young, undersized gosling whom Wilbur befriends shortly after his birth. He initially lives, eats, and sleeps with Wilbur rather than his mother and siblings.
  - Uncle (impersonating Candy Candido), a county fair pig who wins first prize.
  - Lamb
- Herb Vigran as Lurvy, Homer's farmhand who is the first to notice the messages in Charlotte's webs.
- Pamelyn Ferdin as Fern Arable, John's daughter who convinces him to spare Wilbur's life.
- Martha Scott as Mrs. Arable, Fern's mother
- Bob Holt as Homer Zuckerman, Mrs. Arable's brother and Fern's uncle.
- John Stephenson as:
  - John Arable, Fern's father.
  - Parking Officer
  - Mayor
  - Bandleader
- Danny Bonaduce as Avery Arable, Fern's older brother.
- William B. White as Henry Fussy, a boy of about Fern's age, whom she soon starts spending time with while Wilbur is at the fair.
- Dave Madden as:
  - The Ram, one of the first animals Wilbur meets at Homer's farm.
  - Additional Voices
- Joan Gerber as:
  - Edith Zuckerman, Homer's wife. She comes up with the idea of giving Wilbur a buttermilk bath.
  - Mrs. Fussy, Henry's stern mother who never lets him have fun.

Rex Allen narrates this film.

== Production ==
In 1967, animators John and Faith Hubley were interested in purchasing the film rights of Charlotte's Web in hopes of producing a feature-length animated adaptation. E. B. White, who had liked the Hubleys, sold the film rights, but the Hubleys were unable to acquire financial backing and the project languished. In September 1970, the Los Angeles Times reported that White had sold the film rights to Charlotte's Web to Edgar Bronfman Sr.'s Sagittarius Productions, which intended to produce a feature-length animated adaptation of the book. Director-producer Michael Campus was hired to supervise the project. Later, in November, Henry White, president of Sagittarius Pictures, and Campus approached director Gene Deitch to direct Charlotte's Web. Deitch agreed and personally met with E.B. White to discuss how the book should be adapted. As part of the contract deal with E.B. White, he would have the final approval of the character design and the casting of the spider character, Charlotte. However, Campus left the project to direct Z.P.G. (1972), and Deitch later learned he was forbidden to show his storyboards to E.B. White.

Development on the film still continued at Deitch's animation studio in Prague with Czech painter Mirko Hanák producing artwork of the film before dying of leukemia in November 1971. However, Bronfman Sr. began to grow dissatisfied with the European-influenced conceptual artwork. By May 1971, Deitch shipped his storyboards in a package to Sagittarius Productions in New York City, which notified him that his package had gone unopened and would be returned to him. On June 3, 1971, Deitch, in a mailed letter to E.B. White, stated that Sagittarius had refused to look his storyboards following six months of work on the project. That same month, it was reported that Sagittarius Productions had signed a two-picture production deal with Hanna-Barbera Productions in which both films would be distributed by Paramount Pictures, one of the films being Charlotte's Web. Around that same time, Joe Barbera had visited White at his residence in Maine, and the author had highlighted parts of the book he did not want to change, and parts that were "subject to discussion."

=== Casting ===
In January 1972, it was reported that Henry Gibson, Debbie Reynolds, and Tony Randall had signed on to provide the voices of Wilbur, Charlotte, and Templeton. Writing in his autobiography, Barbera wrote that Reynolds had called him and said that she was willing to join the project even without being paid. Although Randall had completed all of his voicework, co-director Iwao Takamoto wrote that "his readings just went flat, which surprised all of us. Tony's delivery was a bit too sophisticated and his singing was too operatic. He did not have enough of that raunchy feeling that the character required." Barbera felt Randall had to be replaced, and approached Paul Lynde, who was voicing characters in The Perils of Penelope Pitstop and other Hanna-Barbera TV shows at the time, to do a reading. Lynde was officially cast in the following spring, which was followed by Agnes Moorehead, Rex Allen, Pamelyn Ferdin, and Martha Scott who had joined the cast.

== Release ==
The film was originally slated to be released during the summer of 1972, but by September 1972, its release was pushed back to early 1973. It premiered at Radio City Music Hall on February 22, 1973, which was followed with its general release on March 1, 1973, by Paramount Pictures in the United States. It was accompanied in theaters by the animated short The Headless Horseman of Sleepy Hollow. It was also released in West Germany on March 30, 1973, as well as August 11 in Sweden, August 25 in Japan, and September 4, 1981, in Australia.

The film was first released on VHS in 1979, followed by three more re-releases in 1988, 1993, and 1996. It made its DVD debut on June 19, 2001. A second DVD release of it was released in 2006.

== Reception ==
Vincent Canby of The New York Times described the music and visuals as "exceedingly uninteresting," but noted that the screenplay "has followed the original so closely that it's still possible to be moved by the story." Variety called the film "heartwarming entertainment" with "imaginative and clever" animation. Gene Siskel of the Chicago Tribune gave the film three stars out of four, writing that although "the animation style is television-quickie (bland, static backgrounds), White's story is so blessed nice it is doubtful that anyone or anything could ruin it." Charles Champlin of the Los Angeles Times wrote, "No one, I think, could ask for a more respectful treatment of a classic ... The grownups will miss some of the artful appeal the book has, but can settle gladly enough for a cheerful and enthusiastic piece of children's fare." In a negative review for The Monthly Film Bulletin, Clyde Jeavons criticized the animation as "stiff, basic and two-dimensional" and the music as lacking "that instant catchiness which has always been a successful feature of Walt Disney's cartoon melodies. But the saddest thing of all is to see E. B. White's celebrated fantasy reduced to such plodding blandness in defiance of its rich potential."

The review aggregator website Rotten Tomatoes gives the film a 76% approval rating based on 21 reviews, with an average score of 6.6/10. The critical consensus reads: "That's some pig, with spirited vocal performances and a charmingly family-friendly adaptation of E.B. White's winsome story spun around him." Among retrospective reviews, Craig Butler of All-Movie Guide criticized the animation and the musical score, but called it a faithful adaptation, noting that "no attempt has been made to soften the existential sadness at the story's core". Dan Jardine criticized the songs and the "Saturday morning cartoon quality" of the animation, but also says that Hamner "retains just enough of White’s elegant prose in the dialogue and narration to keep the film from being simply a painfully well-intended experiment." Christopher Null of Filmcritic.com stated that the animation is sometimes "downright bad", but that White's classic fable needs little to make it come to life. TV Guide reviewed the film with generally positive remarks, stating that "The voices of Reynolds, Lynde, Gibson, and all the rest are perfectly cast, and the songs by the Sherman brothers are solid, although none of them became hits like those they wrote for such Disney movies as MARY POPPINS." When it was reissued on DVD it was awarded an Oppenheim Toy Portfolio Gold Award.

=== E. B. White's reaction ===
Despite assisting in helping keep parts of the story, White was highly displeased with the adaptation. According to Gene Deitch, White wrote him in a 1977 letter, "We have never ceased to regret that your version of 'Charlotte's Web' never got made. The Hanna-Barbera version has never pleased either of us ... a travesty ..." White himself wrote of the film, "The story is interrupted every few minutes so that somebody can sing a jolly song. I don't care much for jolly songs. The Blue Hill Fair, which I tried to report faithfully in the book, has become a Disney World, with 76 trombones. But that's what you get for getting embroiled in Hollywood." White had previously turned down Disney when they offered to make a film based on his book. According to the film's writer, Earl Hamner Jr., Katharine White, White's wife—who sometimes offered advice and suggestions to the filmmakers—would have preferred the music of Mozart in the film, rather than the music of the Sherman Brothers.

== Legacy ==
The film has developed a devoted following over the following years due to television and VHS; in 1994 it surprised the marketplace by becoming one of the best-selling titles of the year, 21 years after its first premiere. No other non-Disney musical animated film has enjoyed such a comeback in popularity, prompting a direct-to-video sequel, Charlotte's Web 2: Wilbur's Great Adventure, which Paramount released in the US on March 18, 2003 (Universal released it internationally and, through Universal Cartoon Studios, also animated it), followed by a live-action film version (co-produced by Nickelodeon Movies) of the original story, which was released on December 15, 2006.

Debbie Reynolds has stated that in her later appearances, when fans handed her items to autograph, most of them were soundtrack albums of the film.

Gary Wince, director of the 2006 CG remake of Charlotte's Web, said on the DVD commentary that the fair sequence had to be lengthened after test audiences commented that Templeton's "Smorgasbord" song was missing, referring to one of the memorable sequences in the 1973 film.

The film is recognized by American Film Institute in these lists:

- 2008: AFI's 10 Top 10:
  - Nominated Animation Film

== Sequel ==
A direct-to-video sequel titled Charlotte's Web 2: Wilbur's Great Adventure was released in 2003, co-produced by Nickelodeon and co-distributed by Universal Studios Home Entertainment. It centers on Wilbur's relationship with a lonely lamb named Cardigan and also shows Charlotte's children as adolescents. Reviews for it were generally unfavorable, with critics panning its animation and plot.

== Music ==
The soundtrack was composed by the Sherman Brothers, who are well known for their work on numerous Disney films. Their father, songwriter Al Sherman, considered it their finest score and named "Mother Earth and Father Time" his favorite song to ever come out of his sons. He died six months after the film's release. Irwin Kostal arranged, supervised, and conducted the music, resulting in his fourth out of five collaborations with the Sherman Brothers.

"Zuckerman's Famous Pig" is the title that saves Wilbur from being slaughtered in the story. It was the theme of the finale song in the film. It was written by the Sherman Brothers and arranged as a barbershop quartet by Irwin Kostal, in keeping with the time and place of the story. It was covered by the Brady Kids and was chosen for release on their first single taken from The Brady Bunch Phonographic Album by producer Jackie Mills on Paramount Records. The group also recorded the theme from the film, as did Ray Conniff for Columbia Records.

=== Songs ===
Original songs performed in the film include:

No.	Title	Performer(s)	Length
1.	"There Must Be Something More"	Pamelyn Ferdin
2.	"I Can Talk!"	Henry Gibson
3.	"Chin Up!"	Debbie Reynolds
4.	"We've Got Lots in Common"	Henry Gibson, Debbie Reynolds, Dave Madden, and Chorus
5.	"Deep in the Dark"	Debbie Reynolds
6.	"Charlotte's Web"	Chorus
7.	"Mother Earth and Father Time"	Debbie Reynolds
8.	"A Veritable Smorgasbord"	Agnes Moorehead and Paul Lynde
9.	"Zuckerman's Famous Pig"	Chorus
10.	"Charlotte's Farewell (Mother Earth and Father Time)"	Debbie Reynolds

== 1973 soundtrack album and 2018 CD reissue ==
The original soundtrack album was released in 1973 on Paramount Records, with a picture disc in 1978 on MCA Records, which bought the Paramount label. In March 2018 the Original Cast Soundtrack was released on CD for the first time by the Varèse Sarabande record label, followed by a vinyl reissue a few months later.

== See also ==
- List of American films of 1973
- List of works produced by Hanna-Barbera Productions
