= L. cornutus =

L. cornutus may refer to:

- Larinioides cornutus, an orb-weaver spider species
- Luxilus cornutus, the common shiner, a fish species

== See also ==
- Cornutus (disambiguation)
