= Charlotte's Web (2006 film) =

2006 film directed by Gary Winick

- Theatrical release poster
- Directed by: Gary Winick
- Screenplay by: Susannah Grant; Karey Kirkpatrick
- Based on: Charlotte's Web by E. B. White
- Produced by: Jordan Kerner
- Starring: Julia Roberts; Dakota Fanning; Steve Buscemi; John Cleese; Oprah Winfrey; Cedric the Entertainer; Kathy Bates; Reba McEntire; Robert Redford; Thomas Haden Church; André Benjamin
- Cinematography: Seamus McGarvey
- Edited by: Susan Littenberg; Sabrina Plisco
- Music by: Danny Elfman
- Production companies: Nickelodeon Movies; Walden Media; The K Entertainment Company
- Distributed by: Paramount Pictures
- Release dates: December 7, 2006 (Australia); December 15, 2006 (United States)
- Running time: 97 minutes
- Country: United States
- Language: English
- Budget: $85 million
- Box office: $148.9 million

Charlotte's Web is a 2006 American live-action animated fantasy comedy-drama film based on the 1952 novel by E. B. White. Directed by Gary Winick and written by Susannah Grant and Karey Kirkpatrick, it is the second theatrical film adaptation of E. B. White's book since the 1973 animated feature film produced by Hanna-Barbera Productions. The film stars Dakota Fanning, Kevin Anderson, and Beau Bridges, and features the voices of Dominic Scott Kay, Julia Roberts, Steve Buscemi, John Cleese, Oprah Winfrey, Thomas Haden Church, André Benjamin, Cedric the Entertainer, Kathy Bates, Reba McEntire, Robert Redford, and Sam Shepard as the narrator. Danny Elfman composed the film's score.

Produced by Walden Media, Jordan Kerner's The K Entertainment Company and Nickelodeon Movies, the film was released in Australia on December 7, 2006, and was released theatrically by Paramount Pictures on December 15, 2006, in the United States. It received generally positive reviews from critics and was a modest success at the box office, grossing $149 million against a budget of $85 million.

A video game of the same name, which was derived from the movie, was released by Sega.

== Plot ==
During springtime on a farm in Somerset County, Maine, 8-year-old Fern Arable discovers that her father John is about to kill a runt of a litter of newborn pigs. Fern successfully begs him to spare the piglet's life, whom she names Wilbur and nurtures him lovingly. The next morning, Fern sneaks Wilbur into her school desk, which causes her to be caught by the teacher and be sent to the principal's office along with Wilbur, resulting in her mother, Mrs. Arable, being called to pick them up from school.

When Wilbur has matured, Fern is regretfully forced to take him to her uncle Homer Zuckerman's barnyard. Mrs. Arable feels slightly concerned for her daughter's behavior and one night, she prevails upon Fern to stay home, do her homework and go straight to bed without visiting Wilbur. During this time, Wilbur feels abandoned and is left yearning for companionship, but is refused by the other barn animals - a comedic, mischievous, rebellious, misunderstood, and "potentially dangerous" rat named Templeton; a serious and steadfast sheep named Samuel; a fun-loving and kindly goose couple named Gussy and Golly; two beautiful and laid-back cow sisters named Bitsy and Betsy; and a cowardly and humorous horse named Ike - until he is befriended by Charlotte A. Cavatica, a beautiful barn spider who lives in the space above Wilbur's sty in the Zuckermans' barn.

When the other animals reveal to Wilbur that he will be prepared for dinner by Christmas, Charlotte promises to hatch a plan guaranteed to save Wilbur's life. With the help of Templeton, Charlotte convinces the Zuckerman family that Wilbur is actually quite special by spelling out descriptions of him in her web such as "Some pig", "Terrific", "Radiant" and "Humble" in the opening to the barn for the Zuckermans to see. These descriptions are even posted in newspapers that the whole town read and came out to see.

Eventually, the Arables, Zuckermans, Wilbur, Charlotte and Templeton go to a fair where Wilbur is entered in a contest. While there, Charlotte produces an egg sac containing her unborn offspring while Wilbur, despite not winning the blue ribbon, is later given a bronze medal and celebrated by the fair's staff and visitors, making him too prestigious to justify killing him. Exhausted from laying eggs, Charlotte cannot return home because she is dying. Wilbur manages to retrieve her egg sac with the help of Templeton, and then tearfully bids farewell to Charlotte before leaving the fair.

Wilbur then lives to witness his first Christmas and by the next spring, hundreds of Charlotte's offspring emerge; most of the young spiders soon leave, but three named Joy, Aranea and Nellie stay and become Wilbur's friends.

== Cast ==
- Dakota Fanning as Fern Arable
- Kevin Anderson as John Arable, Fern's father
- Gary Basaraba as Homer L. Zuckerman, Fern's maternal uncle
- Beau Bridges as Dr. Dorian
- Essie Davis as Phyllis Arable, Fern's mother
- Siobhan Fallon Hogan as Edith Zuckerman, Fern's maternal aunt
- Nate Mooney as Lurvy, the Zuckermans' farmhand
- Louis Corbett as Avery Arable, Fern's older brother
- Julian O'Donnell as Henry Fussy
- Ian Watkin as Fair Official

=== Voices ===
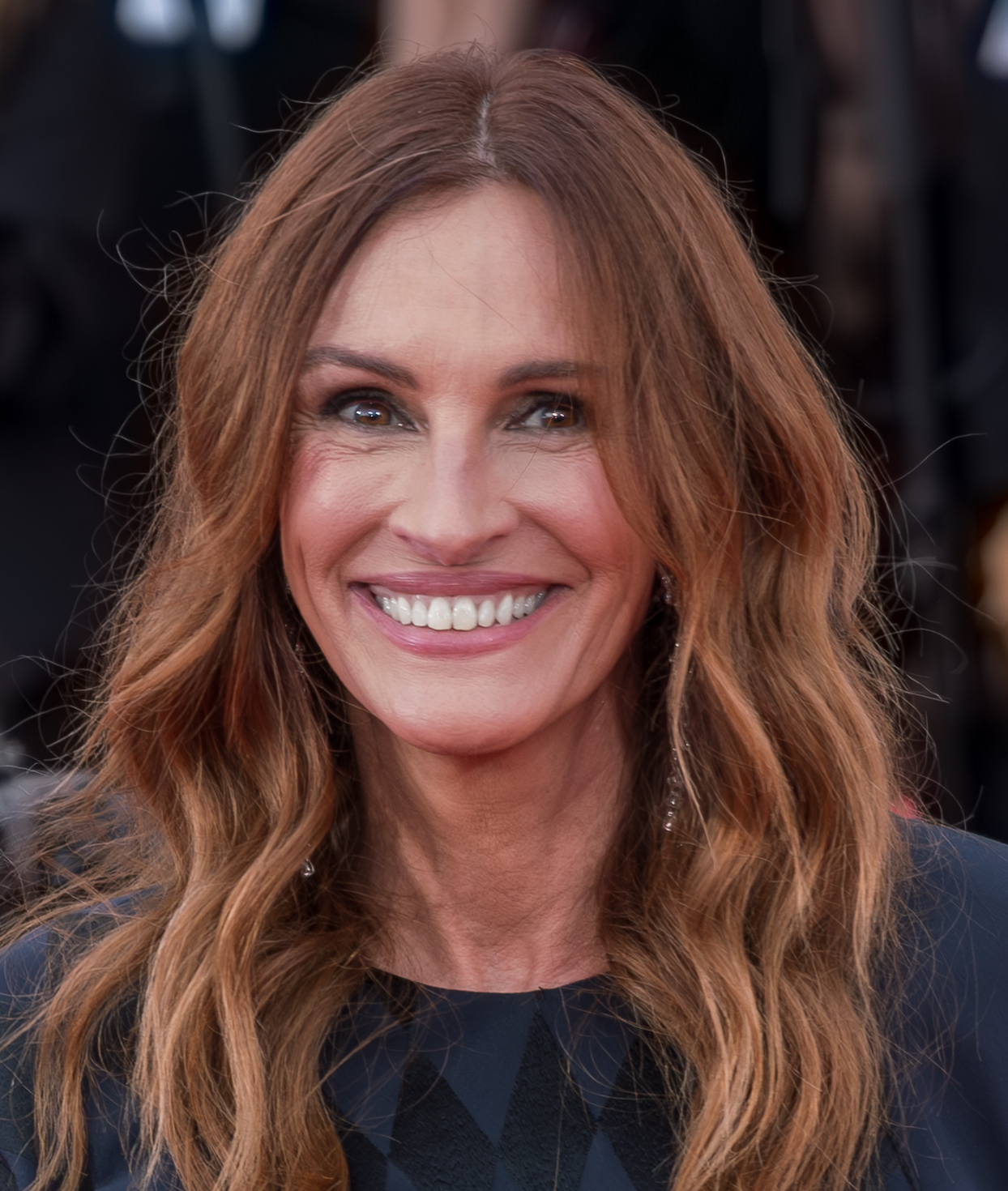
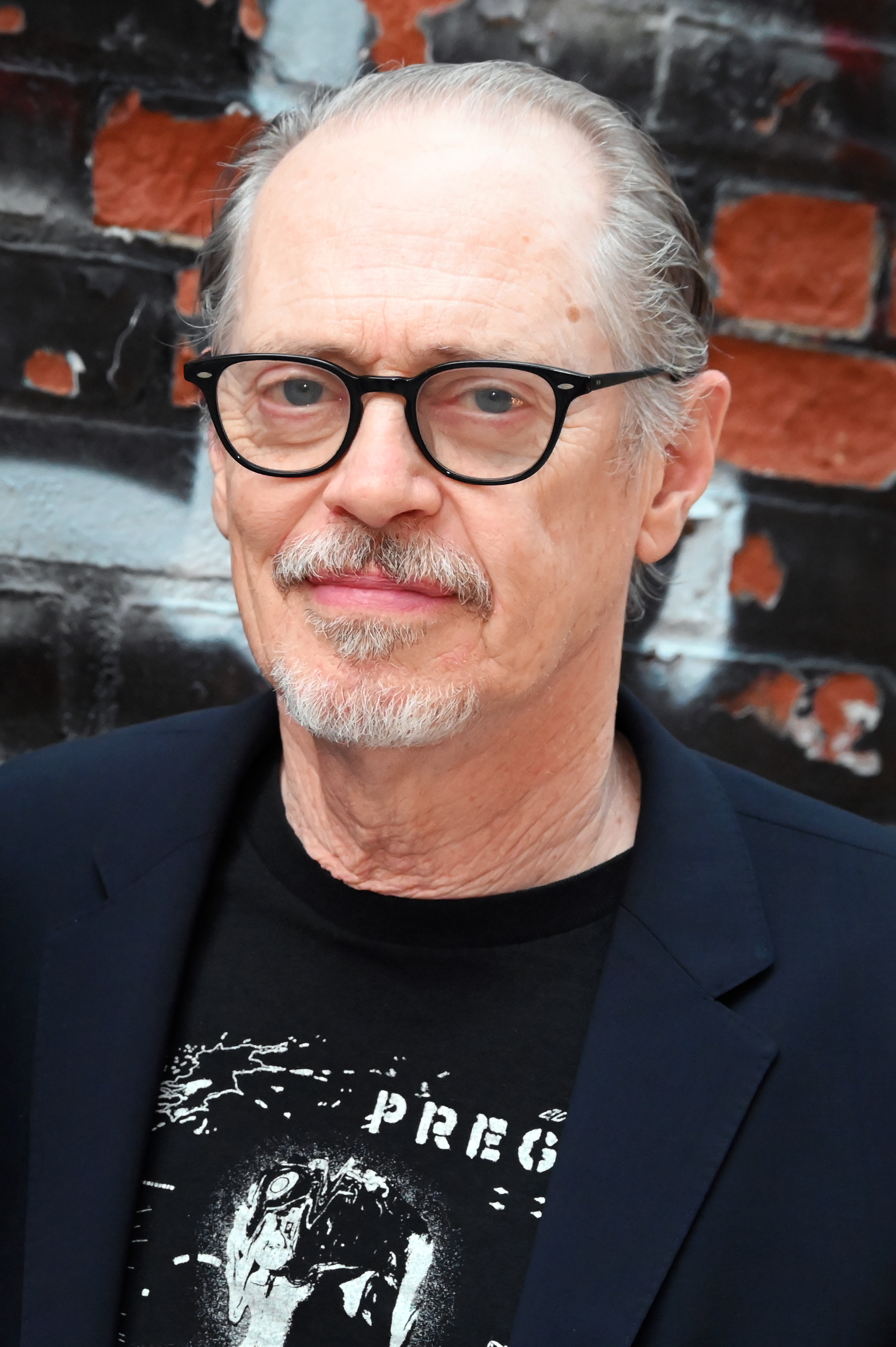
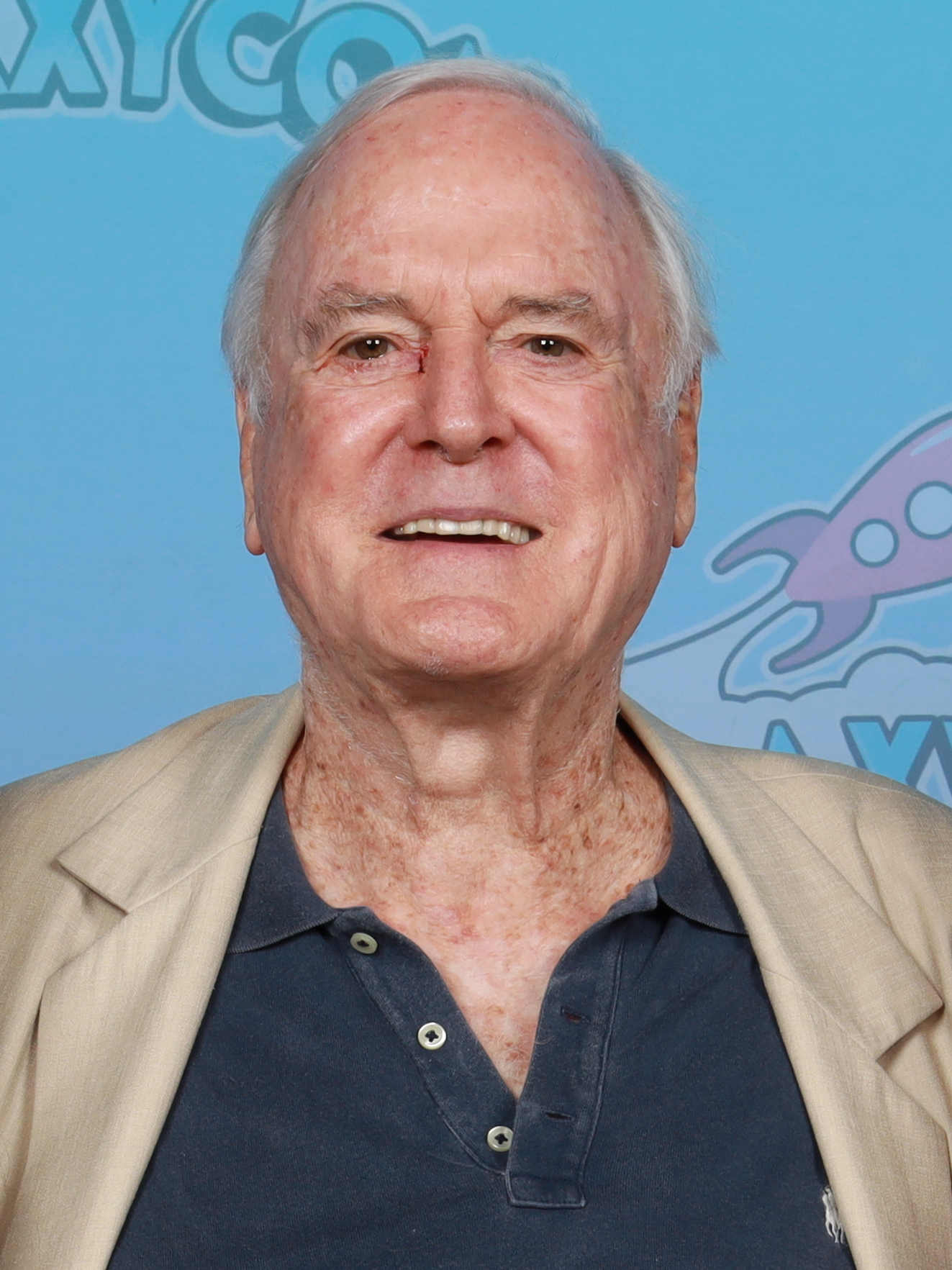
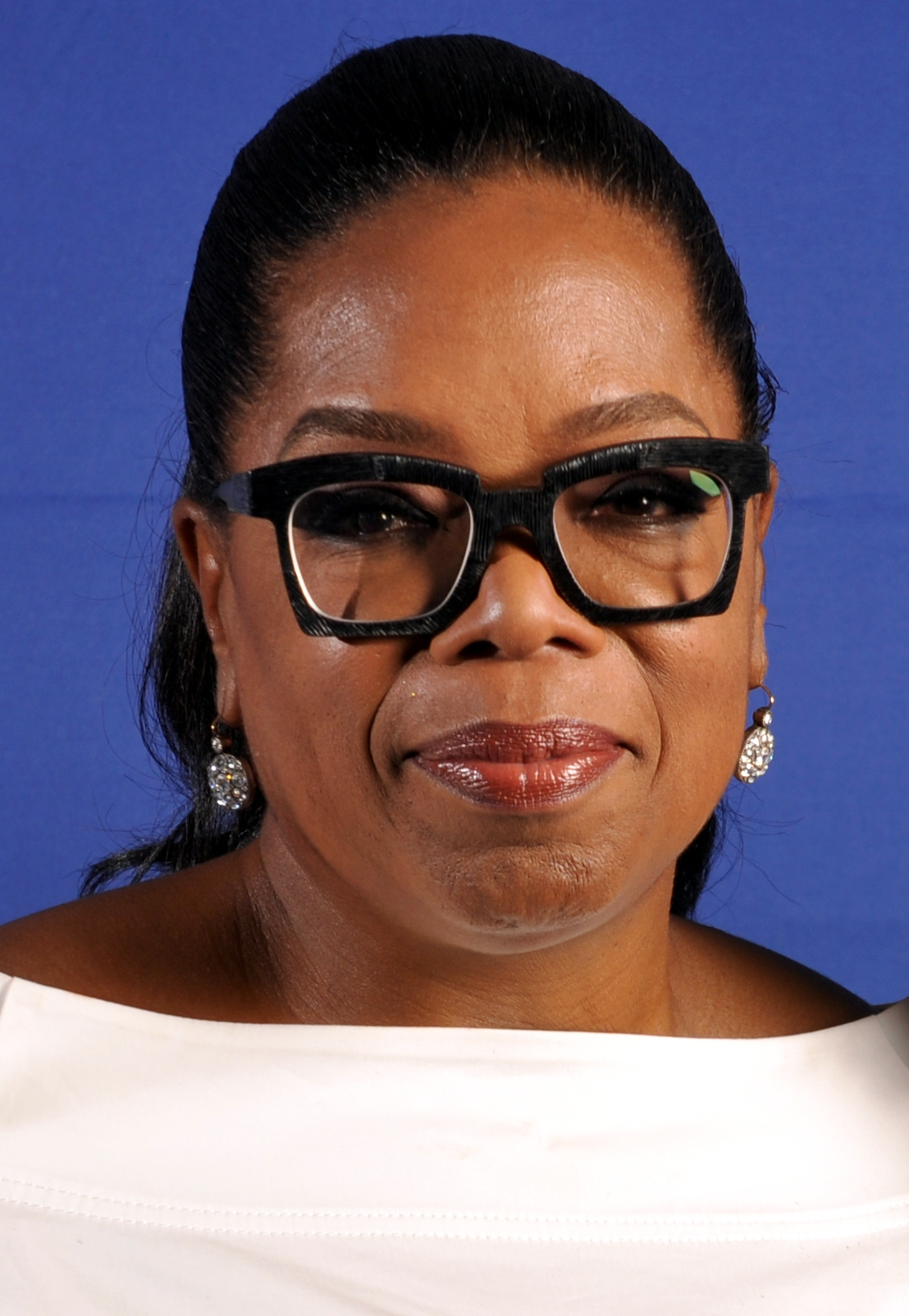
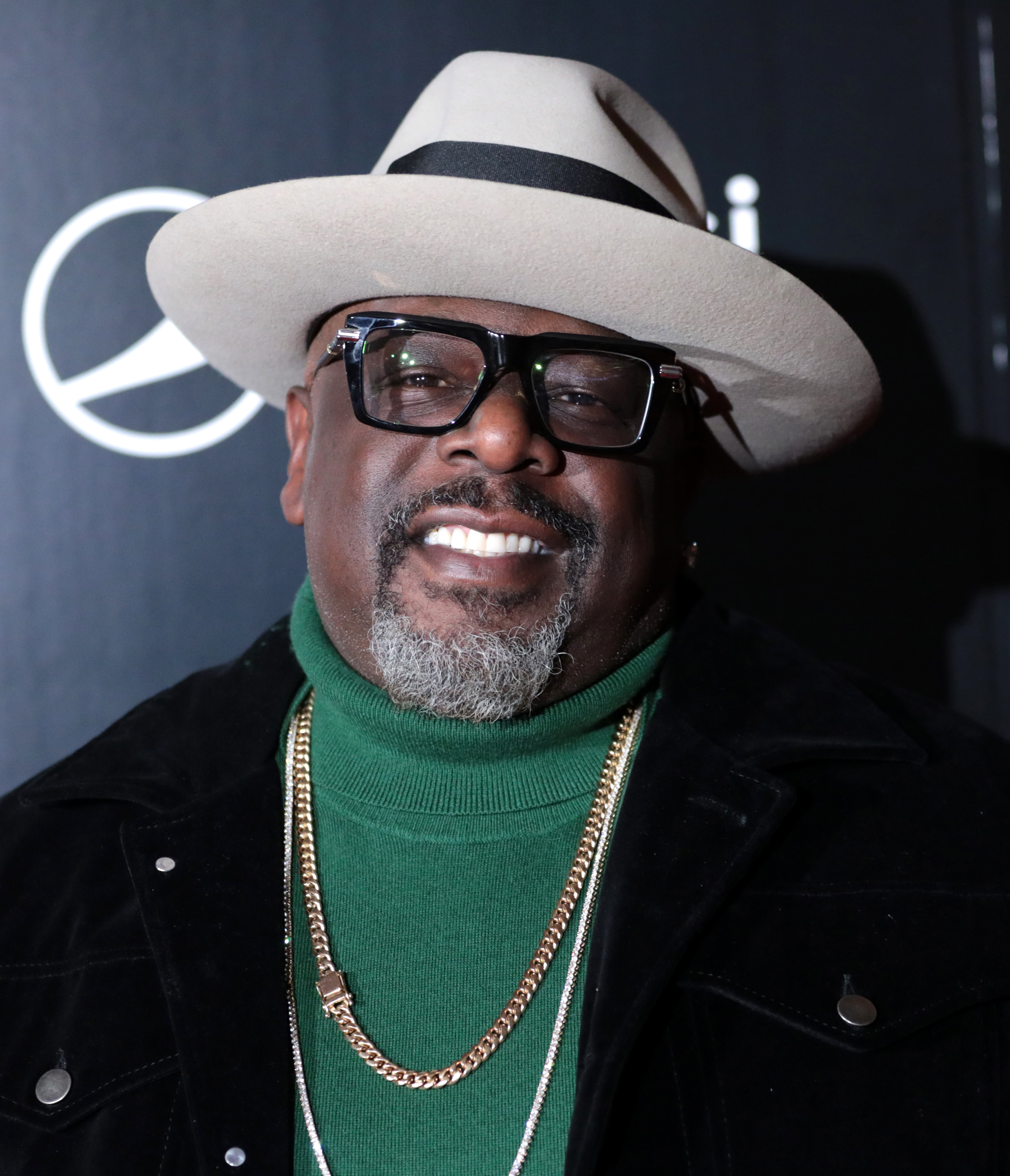
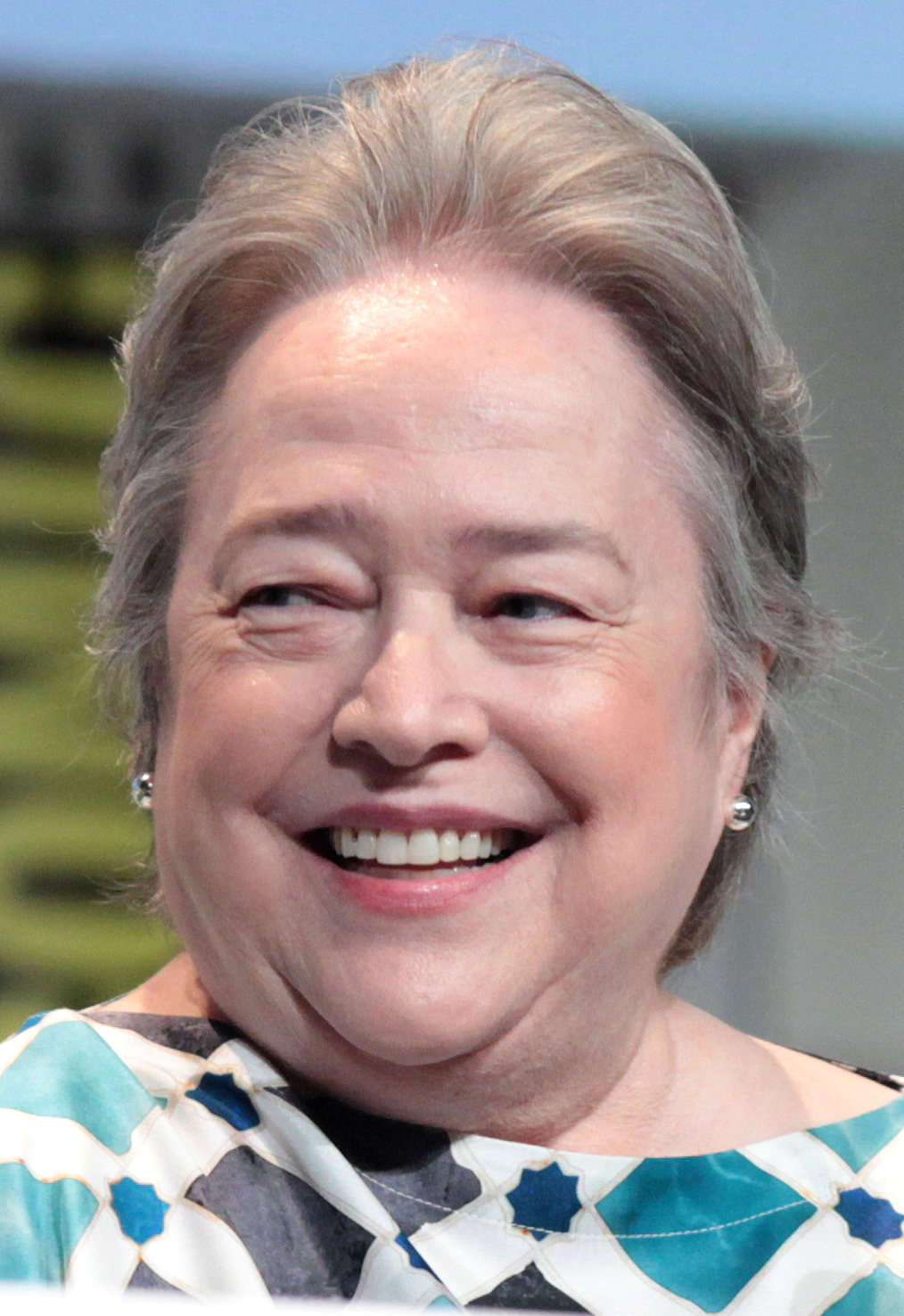
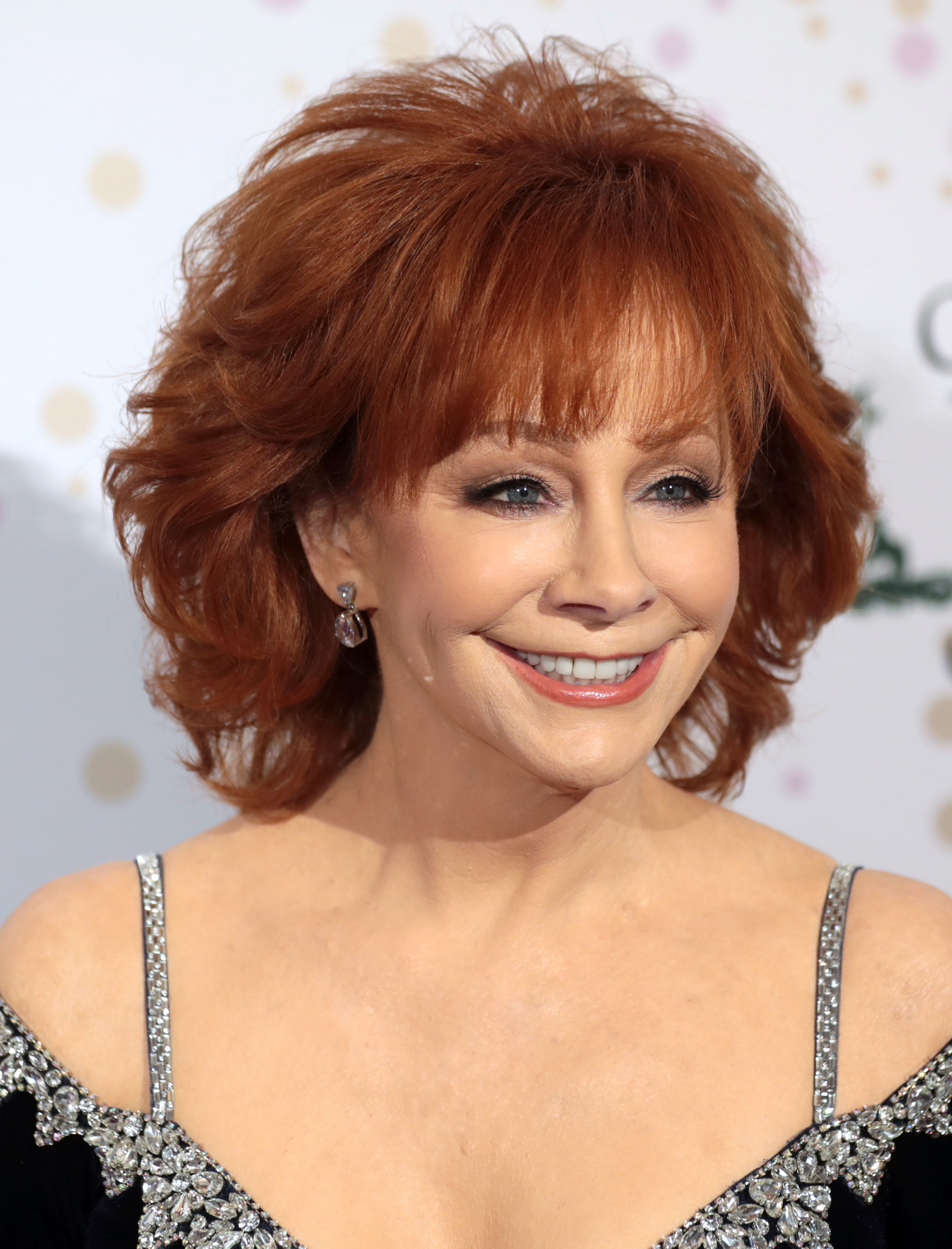
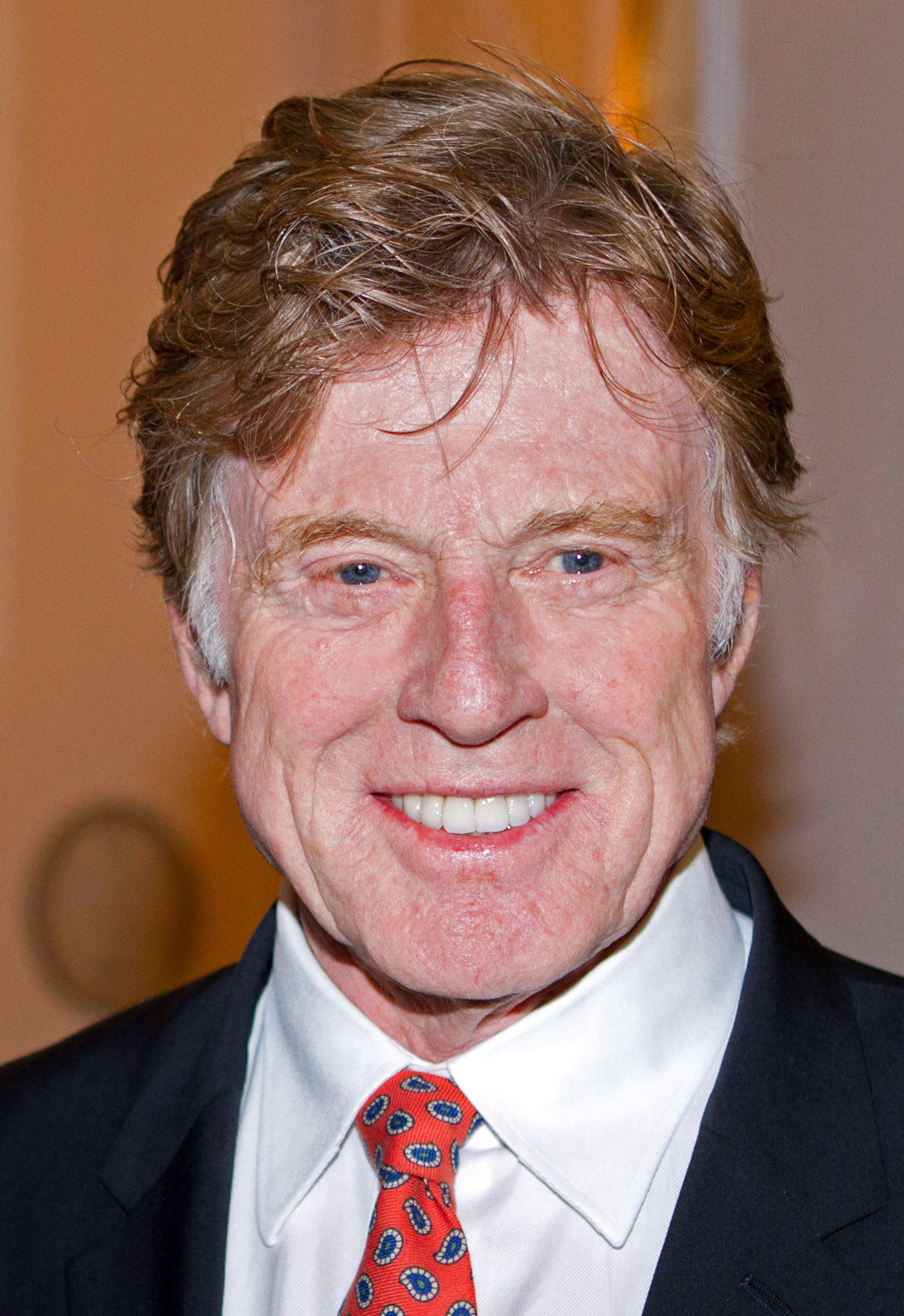
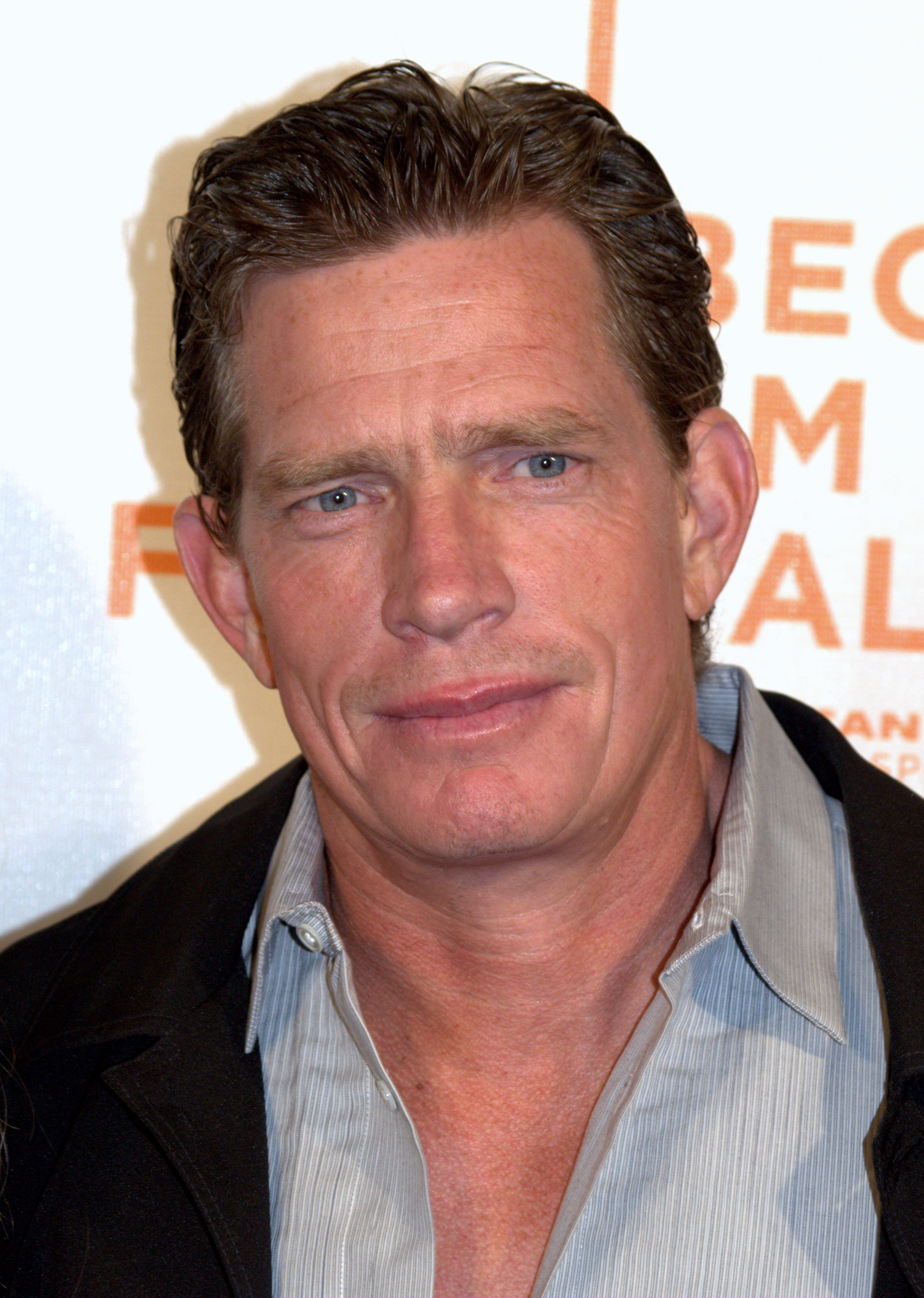
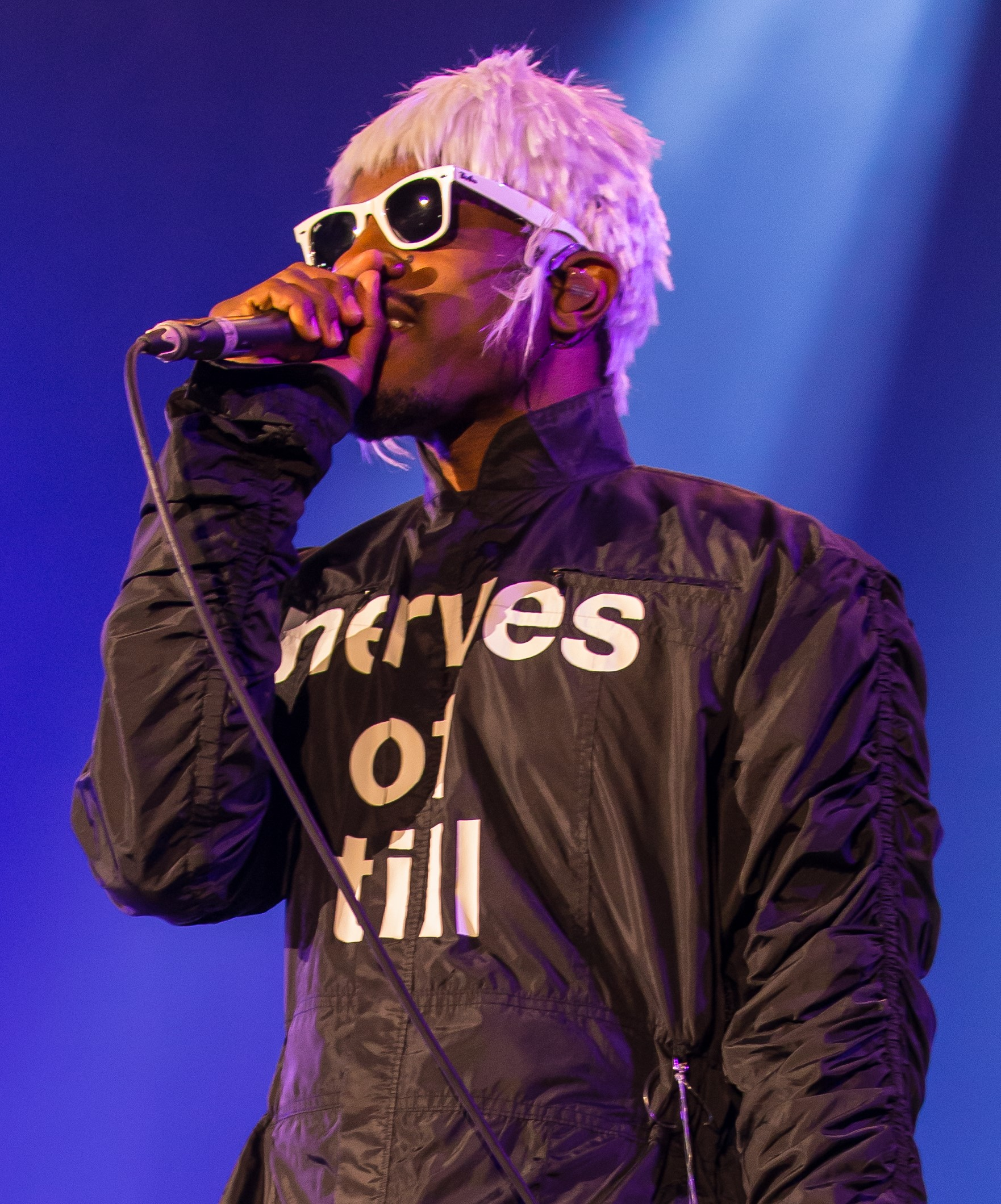
Top: Julia Roberts, Steve Buscemi, and John Cleese voice Charlotte, Templeton and Samuel

Middle: Oprah Winfrey, Cedric the Entertainer and Kathy Bates voice Gussy, Golly and Bitsy

Bottom: Reba McEntire, Robert Redford, Thomas Haden Church and André Benjamin voice Betsy, Ike, Brooks and Elwyn
- Dominic Scott Kay as Wilbur the Spring Pig
- Julia Roberts as Charlotte A. Cavatica the Barn Spider
- Steve Buscemi as Templeton the Rat
- John Cleese as Samuel the Sheep
- Oprah Winfrey as Gussy the Goose
- Cedric the Entertainer as Golly the Gander
- Kathy Bates as Bitsy the Cow
- Reba McEntire as Betsy the Cow
- Robert Redford as Ike the Horse
- Thomas Haden Church as Brooks the Crow
- André Benjamin as Elwyn the Crow
- Abraham Benrubi as Uncle the Pig
- Briana Hodge as Nellie, one of Charlotte's daughters
- Maia Kirkpatrick as Joy, one of Charlotte's daughters
- Jennessa Rose as Aranea, one of Charlotte's daughters
- Sam Shepard as the Narrator

== Production ==
This particular adaptation of Charlotte's Web was produced without any involvement from E. B. White's estate. It was the first film based on a book by E. B. White since 2001's The Trumpet of the Swan.

The filming was completed in May 2005. It was filmed on location in Ballan, Victoria and suburbs in Melbourne. The fair scene in the story was filmed in Heidelberg in Melbourne at Heidelberg West Football Club's football ground. The school scenes were filmed at Spotswood Primary School.

The talking-animal visual effects were done by various visual effect studios such as Rising Sun Pictures, Fuel International, Proof, Rhythm & Hues Studios (which also animated 1999's Stuart Little, another film based on an E. B. White book, as well as its 2002 sequel Stuart Little 2), Digital Pictures Iloura, Stan Winston Studios, and Tippett Studio. Many of the animals were live-action with the exception of Charlotte and Templeton. Much of the film was shot with a hybrid of live-action and CGI. The visual effects supervisor for the film was John Berton, who noted that a live-action version of Charlotte's Web has become much more practical in recent years due to advances in technology. Winick "was adamant" that Charlotte and Templeton should be realistic and not stylized, although they did give Charlotte almond-shaped eyes. John Dietz, visual effects supervisor for Rising Sun Pictures, notes that there was a debate over whether to give her a mouth and that in the end, they decided to have her chelicerae move in what he describes as being almost like a veil as if there were a mouth behind it. The software used for fur was “Furocious”, RenderMan was used for rendering, and SoftImageXSI was used for modeling, rigging, and animation.

== Release ==
The film was scheduled for a June 2006 release, but was pushed back to December 15, 2006, to avoid competition with two other films from Nickelodeon Movies - Nacho Libre and Barnyard - as well as Over the Hedge (which also featured Thomas Haden Church in the cast) and Cars among other films.

=== Home media ===
Charlotte's Web was released on DVD on April 3, 2007, in the United States and Canada and on May 28, 2007, in the United Kingdom. On October 6, 2008, Paramount Home Entertainment released a DVD which bundled the film together with the 1994 version of Lassie and the 1998 film Paulie (which had originally been owned by DreamWorks before 2006). It was then released on Blu-ray on March 29, 2011, alongside The SpongeBob SquarePants Movie. Almost 10 years later, the film was re-released on DVD on January 24, 2017.

== Reception ==
=== Box office ===
The film debuted in third place at the box office with only $11 million. Having spent 14 weeks in theaters, the film grossed $82 million domestically and $61 million overseas for a worldwide total of $144 million before closing on March 22, 2007.

=== Critical response ===
Review aggregation website Rotten Tomatoes gives the film a 79% rating based on 147 reviews with an average rating of 7.0/10, and a 62% audience recommendation based on 250,000+ reviews. The site's critical consensus reads, "Kids will be entertained by the straightforward plot and cute animals, and adults will be charmed by how quiet and humble the production is, a fine translation of E.B. White's genteel prose." On Metacritic the film has a score of 68 out of 100 based on 28 critics, indicating "generally favourable reviews". Audiences polled by CinemaScore gave the film an average grade of "A" on an A+ to F scale.

Michael Medved gave the film three-and-a-half out of four, calling it "irresistible" and "glowing with goodness". Medved also said that Dakota Fanning's performance was "delightfully spunky". Owen Gleiberman of Entertainment Weekly stated that the film was "a bit noisy" but praised the director for putting "the book, in all its glorious tall-tale reverence, right up on screen". He later went on to say that "What hooks you from the start is Dakota Fanning's unfussy passion as Fern." Conversely, Colm Andrew of the Manx Independent gave the film a score of six out of ten, saying that the main problem was "the ultra-cute characterisation of Wilbur, resulting in half the audience rooting for his demise" although overall it was "a competent retelling of a classic story that won't offend".

The film won the 2006 Critics' Choice Award for Best Live-Action Family Film, and Fanning won the Blimp Award for Favorite Movie Actress at the 2007 Kids' Choice Awards.

=== Awards ===
Year	Award	Category	Receiver	Result
2006	Phoenix Film Critics Society	Best Family Film	Charlotte's Web	Winner
2006	St. Louis Film Critics Association	Best Animated or Children's Film	Charlotte's Web	Nominated
2006	Las Vegas Film Critics Society Awards	Best song	David A. Stewart & Glen Ballard	Winner
2006	Las Vegas Film Critics Society Awards	Best Family Film	Charlotte's Web	Winner
2007	Visual Effects Society	Excellent visual effects in a movie	Karin Joy, Blair Clark & John Dietz	Nominated
2007	Visual Effects Society	Excellent performance of an animated character in a live action movie	Grant Adam, Daniel Fotheringham, Avi Goodman & Paul Buckley	Nominated
2007	Visual Effects Society	Excellent performance of an animated character in a live action movie	Todd Labonte, Jason Armstrong, Sven Jensen & David Richard Nelson	Nominated
2007	BMI Awards	Best Music	Danny Elfman	Winner
2007	Critics' Choice Movie Awards	Best Family Film (Live Action)	Charlotte's Web	Winner
2007	Critics' Choice Movie Awards	Best Young Actress	Dakota Fanning	Nominated
2007	Critics' Choice Movie Awards	Best song	Sarah McLachlan	Nominated
2007	Genesis Awards	Best Family Feature Film	Charlotte's Web	Winner
2007	International Film Music Critics Association	Best Original Score for an Animated Film	Charlotte's Web	Nominated
2007	Nickelodeon Kids' Choice Awards	Favorite female movie star	Dakota Fanning	Winner
2007	Satellite Awards	Best Youth DVD	Charlotte's Web	Nominated
2007	Movieguide Awards	Best Fantasy Film	Charlotte's Web	Winner
2007	Movieguide Awards	Best Family Film	Charlotte's Web	Winner
2007	Young Artist Awards	Best Performance in a Dubbing Role: Young Actor	Dominic Scott Kay	Winner
2007	Young Artist Awards	Best Performance in a Feature Film - Young Lead Actress	Dakota Fanning	Nominated
2007	Academy of Science Fiction, Fantasy and Horror Films	Best Fantasy Film	Charlotte's Web	Nominated
2007	Academy of Science Fiction, Fantasy and Horror Films	Best special effects	Karin Joy, John Andrew Berton Jr. & John Dietz	Nominated

== Soundtrack ==
Charlotte's Web

Film score by Danny Elfman
- Released: 2006

Danny Elfman chronology
Serenada Schizophrana (2006)	Charlotte's Web (2006)	Standard Operating Procedure (2008)

Charlotte's Web: Music from the Motion Picture was released by Sony Classical on December 5, 2006. In addition to the instrumental score by Danny Elfman (composing his second film for Nickelodeon Movies, following Nacho Libre, which was released the same year), the soundtrack includes the song "Ordinary Miracle", composed by Glen Ballard and Dave Stewart, and performed by Sarah McLachlan, which she also performed during the opening ceremonies of her hometown Vancouver Winter Olympics. In order to compose the score for Charlotte's Web, Elfman dropped out of Spider-Man 3. A CD compilation of "Music Inspired by the Motion Picture" was issued on December 12, 2006.

== Video game ==
A video game based on the movie, developed by Backbone Entertainment and published by Sega, was released on December 12, 2006, for the Game Boy Advance, Nintendo DS, and PC.

Another game based on the film was released in Europe for the PlayStation 2 by Blast Entertainment on April 5, 2007.
