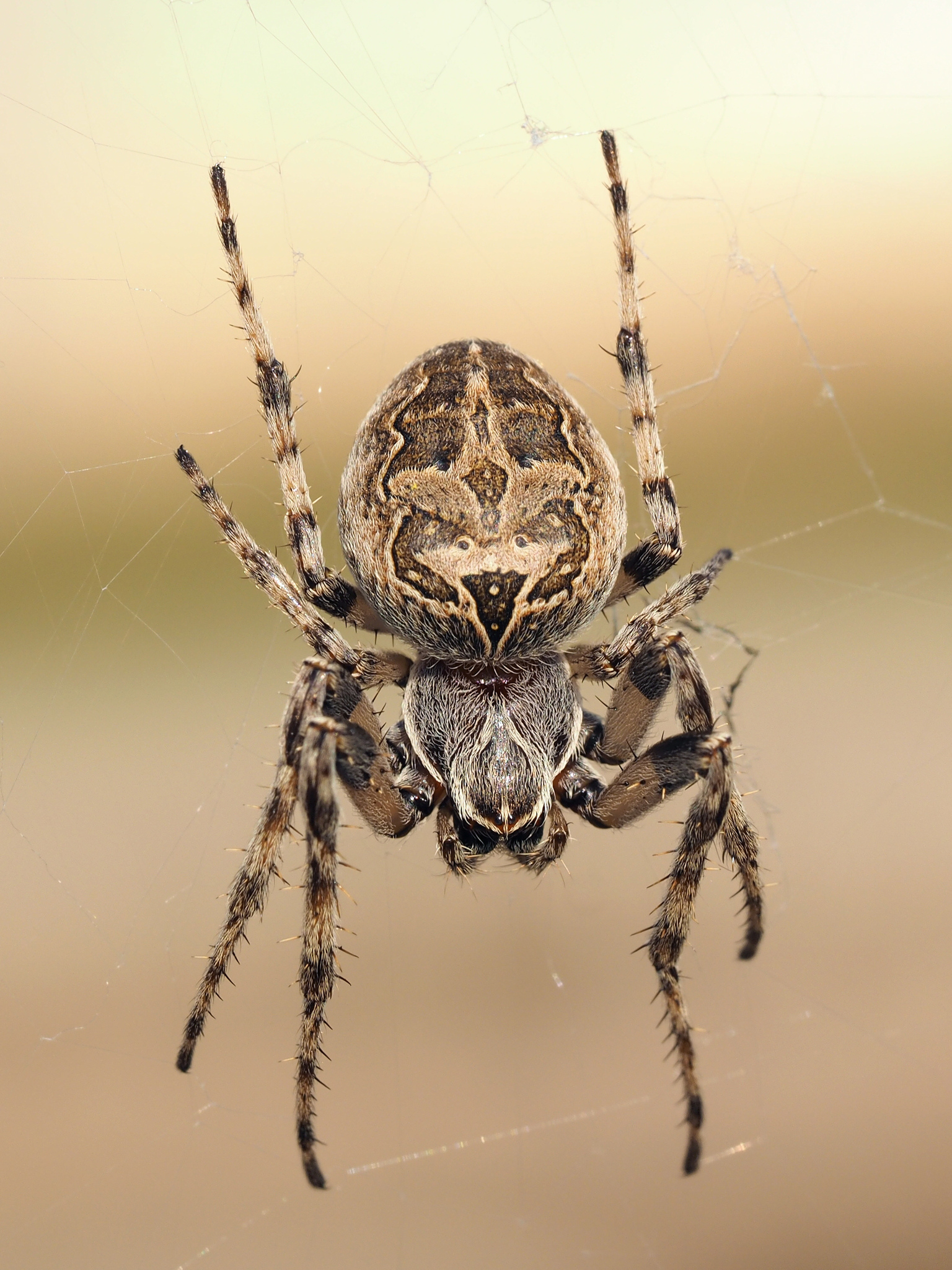
- L. sclopetarius female in Italy

Scientific classification
- Kingdom: Animalia
- Phylum: Arthropoda
- Subphylum: Chelicerata
- Class: Arachnida
- Order: Araneae
- Infraorder: Araneomorphae
- Family: Araneidae
- Genus: Larinioides
- Species: L. sclopetarius

Binomial name
- Larinioides sclopetarius (Clerck, 1757)
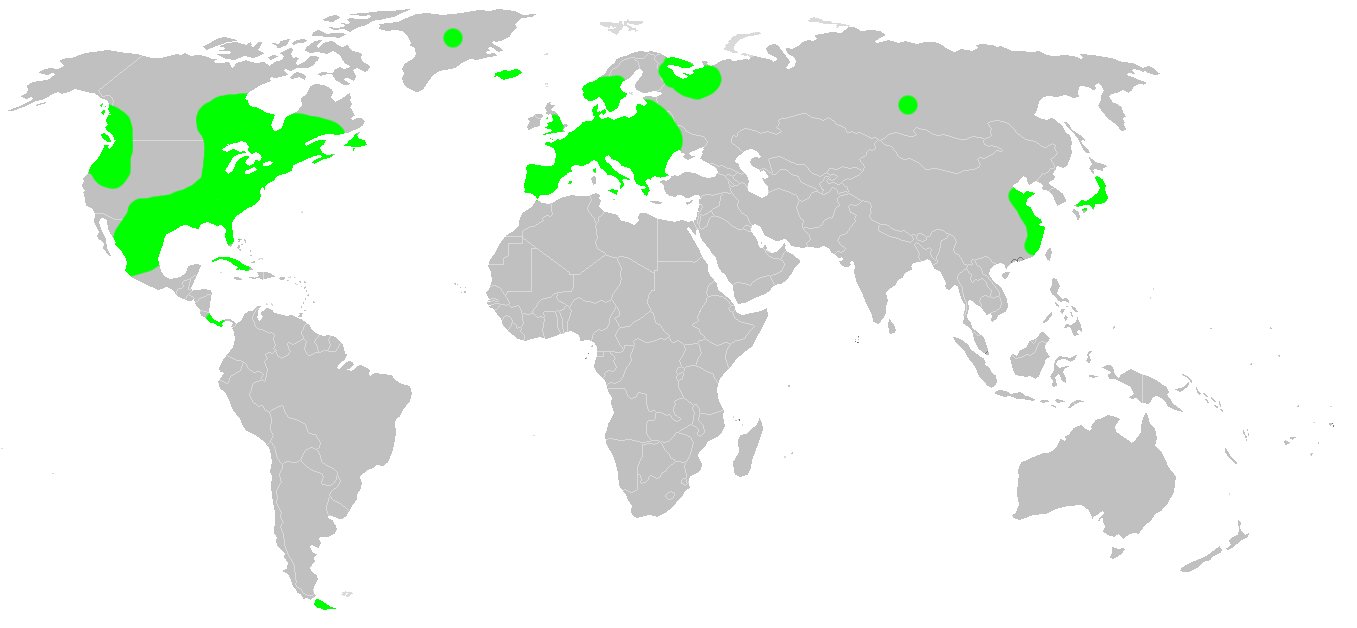
- known world range

Synonyms
- Araneus sclopetarius Araneus sericatus Aranea undata Aranea oviger Epeira sericata Epeira virgata Epeira frondosa Epeira sclopetaria Epeira umbratica Epeira hygrophila Aranea sericata Epeira undata Cyphepeira sclopetaria Aranea sclopetaria Nuctenea sclopetaria

= Larinioides sclopetarius =

Bridge-spider

Species of spider

Larinioides sclopetarius, commonly called bridge-spider or gray cross-spider, is a relatively large orb-weaver spider with Holarctic distribution. These spiders originated in Europe, have been observed as south as the Mediterranean Coast and as north as Finland, and have been introduced to North America. They are often found on bridges, especially near light and over water. The species tends to live on steel objects and is seldom seen on vegetation. Females reach a body length of 10–14 mm, and males 8–9 mm. Their orb webs can have diameters of up to 70 cm.

L. sclopetarius is attracted to light. Spiders found near light sources may be in better condition and have greater reproductive success than spiders living in unlit areas. Most of these lighted areas are found in cities or other metropolitan areas. As a result, many urban areas have become saturated with these spiders. As many as 100 of these spiders can be found in a square meter in optimal feeding locations.

L. sclopetarius often hide during the day and wait for prey in the center of their web at night. In high-density populations, spiders may remain sedentary to protect their territories. Mature females and juvenile spiders will often build webs. However, adult males generally inhabit adult female webs. Males can be found mostly during summer, while females are active until November in Central Europe.

== Taxonomy ==
The common name "bridge-spider" is attributed to its preferential habitat of building webs on bridges.

Lariniodes sclopetarius was first recorded by Carl Clerck in 1757. The genus Lariniodes indicates that they create large noticeable orb webs.

There has been some dispute in how the spider should be classified. The spider has been proposed as a synonym for L. cornutus due to their similar male pedipalps. However, their habitats vary greatly. This finding has been used as evidence that these two species are distinct.

== Description ==
L. sclopetarius exhibit a slight sexual dimorphism, where females are heavier than males. Females typically weigh around 60 mg, whereas males weigh around 38 mg. However, males may be slightly larger than females. Females can range from 4.5- 6.25 mm in length. Males vary from 4.25 mm -7 mm in length.

L. sclopetarius differs from its close relatives, L. patagiatus and L. cornutus, with a few defining characteristics. Unlike the latter two species, L. sclopetarius has white hairs that provide a silhouette for their heads and dark markings on its abdomen.

== Plasticity ==
L. sclopetarius shows high plasticity levels based on resource availability. These spiders exhibit variability in growth and weight gain between molting-periods. Their intermolt periods have a broader range of values than other spiders that inhabit urban environments such as Zygiella x‐notata.

Additionally, L. sclopetarius can alter its growth rate without increasing its risk of mortality. In resource-abundant areas, spiders have exhibited accelerated maturation. Their fast growth rates may allow them to colonize areas that can accommodate them.

== Habitat and distribution ==
In North America L. sclopetarius is most common in the Great Lakes states, but can be found throughout the country. It is mostly found near buildings. L. sclopetarius is also found in Central Europe, often near water. They are also most commonly found near artificial sources of light near water bodies such as bridges and boats. They often aggregate in high densities near light sources. The lights tend to attract more insects which increases the spider's prey capture. Their light-seeking behaviors may have some genetic basis.

In these feeding-locations, adult females tend to occupy the best foraging areas. Juveniles and immature spiders are relegated to worse feeding areas when competition is high. These behaviors may be observed because juveniles are unable to compete for better territories. However, when these spiders mature, they often search for more illuminated areas to create their webs and lay their eggs.

== Territoriality ==
L. sclopetarius is not a social spider. However, they often build webs next to each other. Females exhibit territorial defense of their webs from intruders, including other members of the same species. In high population densities, females exhibit more aggressive behavior to conspecifics due to the shortages of territories.

== Diet ==
These spiders are primarily nocturnal foragers. Their prey capture fluctuates with the seasons. Their prey capture is highest in the summer months, declining in the spring and fall. Chironomids consist of a significant portion of their diet. These small flies may comprise up to 94% of the spiders' diets. Their prey's average size ranges from 1.2 to 6.8 mm.

== Webs ==
L. sclopetarius creates circular orb webs unlike other orb-web spiders that construct elliptical orb webs. Additionally, their orb-webs change in shape as the spider ages. As the spider matures, the adhesive web's lower-section will continue to increase whereas the web's upper section will become proportionally smaller. This discrepancy in web-size becomes more prominent as the spider gets larger. Spiders in high-prey areas create webs with larger capture areas. These trends differ from other spiders such as A. keyserlingi where satiated spiders created smaller webs.

L. sclopetarius creates webs near sources of light. The part of the web adjacent to the light captures more prey than parts of the web farther away from the light .

When resting in webs, these spiders tend to orient their posteriors in the direction of the wind. When the direction of the wind changes, the spider attempts to position itself back towards it. This behavior may have evolved to reduce the spider's risk of being blown off the web's hub. Adhering to webs may be a challenge for L. sclopetarius in urban environments due to the lack of areas that can accommodate stable web sites under windy conditions.

=== Web type ===
Adults create asymmetrical webs. The outer frame threads are generally similar in structure. The hubs, which are centers of the web, are also comparable to each other. The difference lies in the radii of the capture threads. The lower region radii of the capture threads are larger than the upper regions of the web. The web's unequal sizes may be due to the spider's easier accessibility to the captured prey in the lower regions of the web. This capture web asymmetry increases with spider weight and becomes more pronounced as the spiders age. Unlike adults, juveniles create symmetrical webs.

=== Web construction ===
The mean mesh height--the distance between different capture threads--is approximately 2 mm. Unlike many other spiders, L. sclopetarius does not follow the trend of greater mesh height equating to capturing larger prey. One explanation may be the lack of prey diversity. Regardless of mesh height, L. sclopetarius primarily targets smaller dipterans.

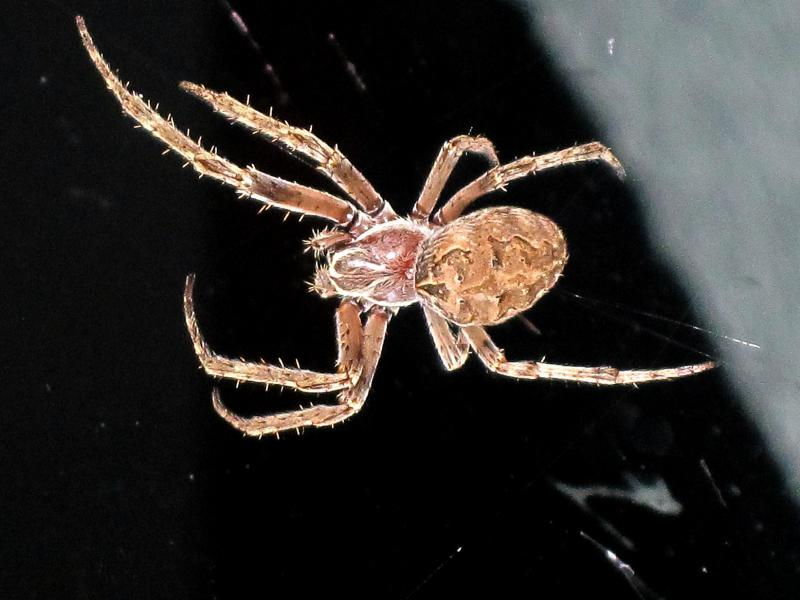
Female Lariniodes sclopetarius in the Netherlands

== Reproduction and life-cycle ==
L. sclopetarius spiders live for approximately 1.5 years under optimal conditions. Females have an above average reproductive ability producing up to 15 egg sacs. Males typically grow faster than females and mature into adults up to a month earlier.

Unlike many spiders, development is independent of the seasons. Adult spiders may mature at any point during the year, however the greatest concentration of mature spiders occurs in late Summer.

== Mating ==
Assortative mating may be at play, as aggressive males and females are more likely to mate with each other. Additionally, non-aggressive individuals are more likely to mate with each other. Aggression may be selected for as it may be important for securing the best sites for web building, which are around light sources. In some instances, groups of aggressive spiders may have lower mortality rates than mixed groups with non-aggressive and aggressive spiders.

Aggressive males tend to create more fit males. Female reproductive success was partially dependent on female size rather than aggressiveness.

=== Sexual cannibalism ===
Females may eat males when resources are scarce. Females that consume insects generally absorb more lipids, which provide a more efficient energy-source. Sexual cannibalism does not seem to affect spider egg sac mass and clutch size because protein and lipid diets had elicited similar results. However, when food sources are scarce, spiderlings from females consuming high lipid diets may have better survival rates than spiderlings from females consuming high protein diets. Males may be seen as last-resort prey where there are no better options.

Spiderlings from mothers who consumed male L. sclopetarius were observed spinning their webs sooner than mothers that solely ate insects. This observed behavior may either be due to the male providing necessary proteins for silk production or an environmental stressor that encouraged web building to compete in resource-scarce settings.

== Sexual dimorphism ==
This spider follows Rensch's rule which states that male size is more variable than female size. There is only a small sexual dimorphism between males and females. Females grow slower and have more instars than males. As a result, they become heavier than males. Males grow faster and weigh approximately 40% of females. They also have longer legs and are larger than female spiders. These longer leg lengths may be due to mating advantages due to female choice or male competition.

Diet may be related to male spider size. Poorer diets are associated with male spiders that possess shorter legs. Female spider size was unaffected by the quality of the diet. Female size may be undergoing stabilizing selection, which can explain the lack of variance in size despite diet changes.

== Social behavior ==
Female spiders live independently, defending their own webs. However, male spiders may have a kleptoparasitic relationship with a female. They often choose to live on a female's web and steal their prey.

L. sclopetarius exhibits high levels of activities in unfamiliar environments, which may have contributed to their widespread colonization of urban areas. In experimental conditions, they tend to move and explore new settings more than their other urban counterparts Zygiella x-notata.

L. sclopetarius exhibits many aggressive behaviors such as chasing and attacking conspecifics. If individuals are in the same web, they may engage in web-shaking contests. These aggressive behaviors may be genetically inherited. Males are generally more aggressive than female.

L. sclopetarius typically positions itself on the lower areas of the web. This can be seen as a defensive behavior as it allows the spider to easily escape from the web from predators by using a safety line.

== Physiology ==
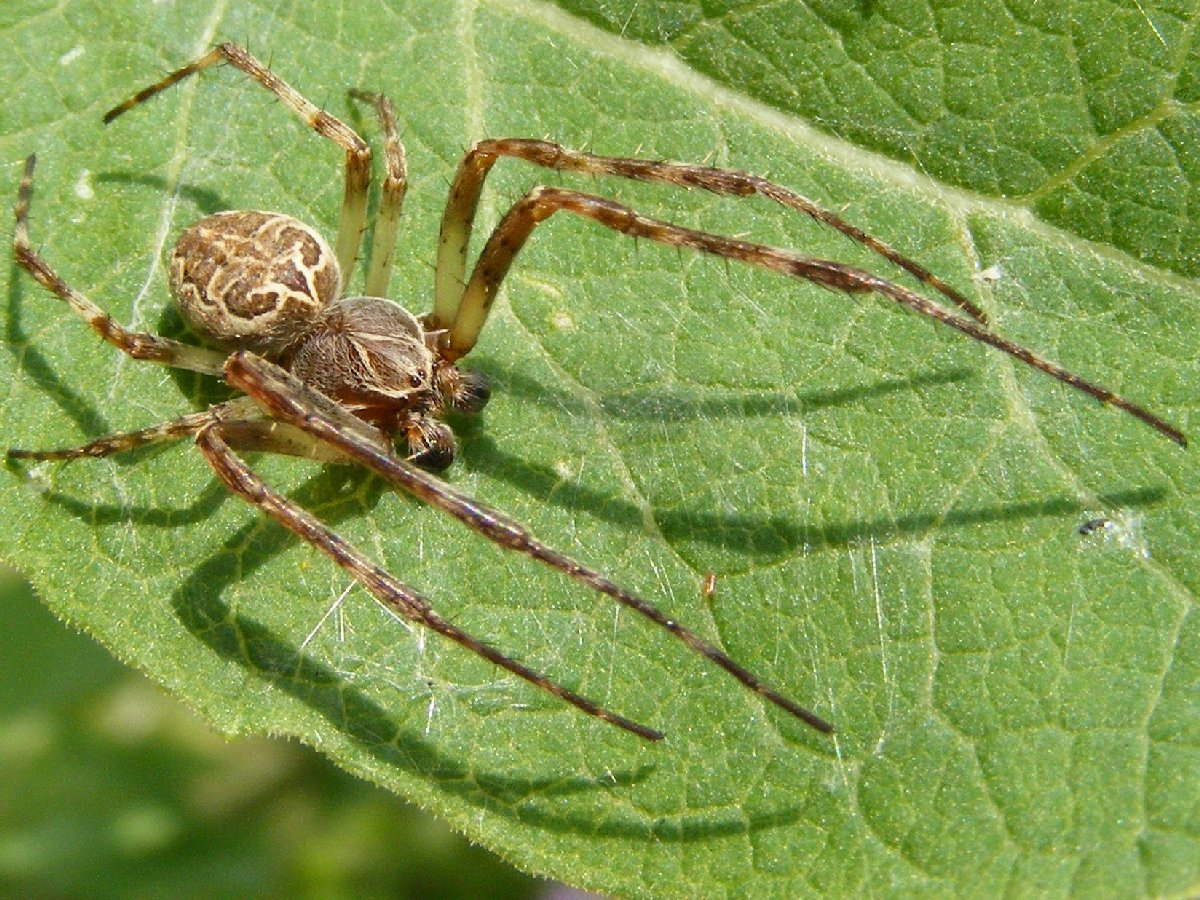
In Quebec, Canada

=== Locomotion ===
L. sclopetarius moves between areas using a ballooning technique where the spider releases threads into the wind to travel. This method allows the spider to travel to preferable feeding areas.

=== Glands and toxins ===
L. sclopetarius secretes anti-adhesive compounds that prevent its legs from sticking to their capture-threads. The mechanism for how these spiders develop and secrete this protection is currently unknown.

=== Protandry ===
Male spiders exhibit protandry. The benefits for this behavior are unknown; the number of females able to breed throughout the year is relatively constant. Other factors that encourage protandry such as mate guarding and time of mating were not seen in L. sclopetarius.

== Predators ==
Phalacrotophora epeirae is one predator that consumes L. sclopetarius eggs.

Trypoxylon attenuatum is a species of spider hunting wasp exhibited to hunt L. sclopetarius. These wasps are normally found in Southern Europe and prey on both foraging and sedentary spiders. T. attenuatum will paralyze spiders and bring them back to their nests. Once at the nest, L. sclopetarius may have an egg laid in it and serve as a food source for the wasp's larvae.

== Interactions with humans and animals ==
L. sclopetarius has been found in urban environments aggregating around light sources. In Finland, they have been found in boats and boathouses. These spiders can migrate via boats which have caused them to be found in isolated islands such as the Åland Islands and spread over much of coastal Europe. One restaurant boat owner said the staff needed to get rid of webs every morning as they were driving away customers.

The annual migration of Larinioides sclopetarius is notable in Chicago, where ballooning spiders attach themselves to high rise buildings. L. sclopetarius webs serve as a balloon to move through air currents till they find an ideal location to construct their new webs. This usually causes panic with people. However, this is a common occurrence especially in high rise buildings because these spiders prefer higher ground. Because of this, L. sclopetarius prefers to reside along hotel windows, due to the added benefit of bright lights for insect prey to get trapped in their webs.

=== Bites to humans ===
Even when these spiders are present together in large numbers, they typically do not bite humans. L. sclopetarius is venomous; however, the effect of the venom ranges from the potency of a mosquito-bite to the sting of a honeybee. If they do bite, it is when their webs are threatened, and the bite is usually superficial and heals quickly without much need for medical help.
