= Charlotte's Web (video game) =

2006 video game

- Microsoft Windows cover
- Developers: Backbone Entertainment; Atomic Planet Entertainment (PS2)
- Publishers: Sega; Blast! Entertainment (PS2)
- Platforms: Game Boy Advance; Nintendo DS; Microsoft Windows; PlayStation 2
- Release: November 14, 2006: Game Boy Advance, Nintendo DS; NA: November 14, 2006; AU: December 7, 2006; EU: February 9, 2007; Microsoft Windows; NA: November 17, 2006; EU: February 9, 2007; PlayStation 2; EU: April 5, 2007
- Genre: Adventure
- Mode: Single-player

Charlotte's Web is a 2006 adventure game based on the movie of the same name. Developed by Backbone Entertainment, it was released by Sega for Game Boy Advance, Nintendo DS, and Microsoft Windows. A separate version for PlayStation 2 was developed by Atomic Planet Entertainment and published by Blast! Entertainment in 2007, only in Europe.

The Windows version, subtitled Wilbur and Friends, features nine mini-games based around the characters from the film. The DS and GBA games are action-platform titles with several mini-games in each. Additionally, the DS version supports a 'Nintendogs' style pet simulator, which kicks in during every mid-level save point. Both titles feature the voice of Dominic Scott Kay, the actor playing Wilbur in the motion picture.

== Reception ==
Reception

Aggregate score
Aggregator	Score	
Aggregator	DS	GBA
Metacritic	60/100	53/100

Review scores
Publication	Score	
Publication	DS	GBA
IGN	6.5/10	6/10
NGamer	39%	39%
Nintendo Power	6/10	N/A

The DS and Game Boy Advance versions received "mixed" reviews according to the review aggregation website Metacritic.

== PlayStation 2 Version ==
In 2007, a separate version of the game was released exclusively in Europe for the PlayStation 2, titled simply Charlotte's Web, excluding the subtitle of Wilbur and Friends. This version of the game is entirely different to the Game Boy Advance and PC versions. In this version of the game, players primarily play as Wilbur, exploring an open farm from a third person perspective. These sections often involve running around the farm collecting items for other characters while avoiding dogs and farmers that will send the player back to the start of the level. In addition to this, Charlotte the Spider and Templeton the Rat are also playable in the form of more linear minigames in between Wilbur's levels.
