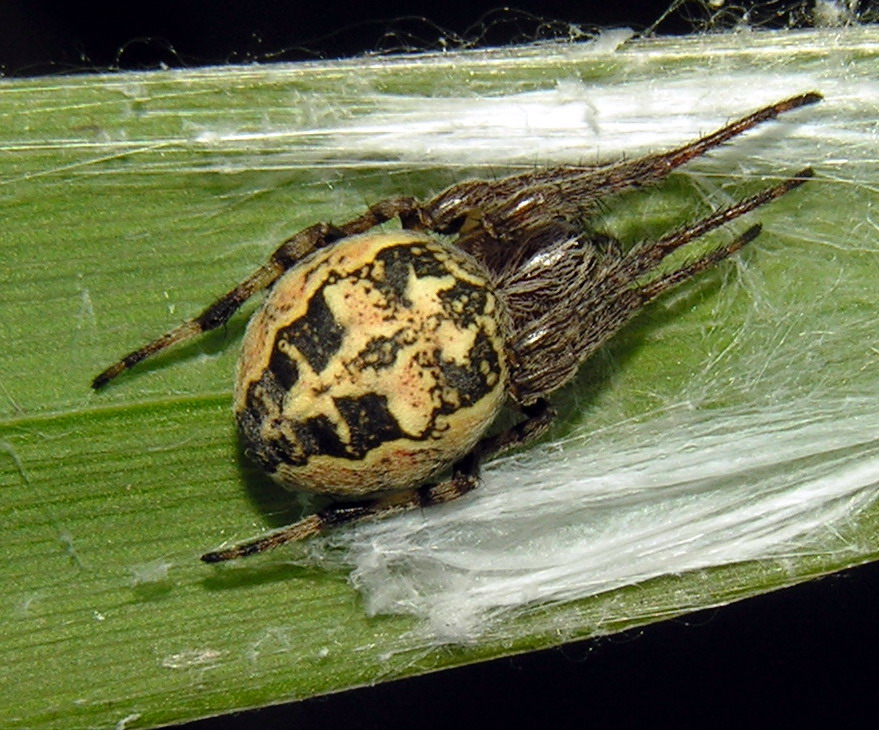
- L. cornutus
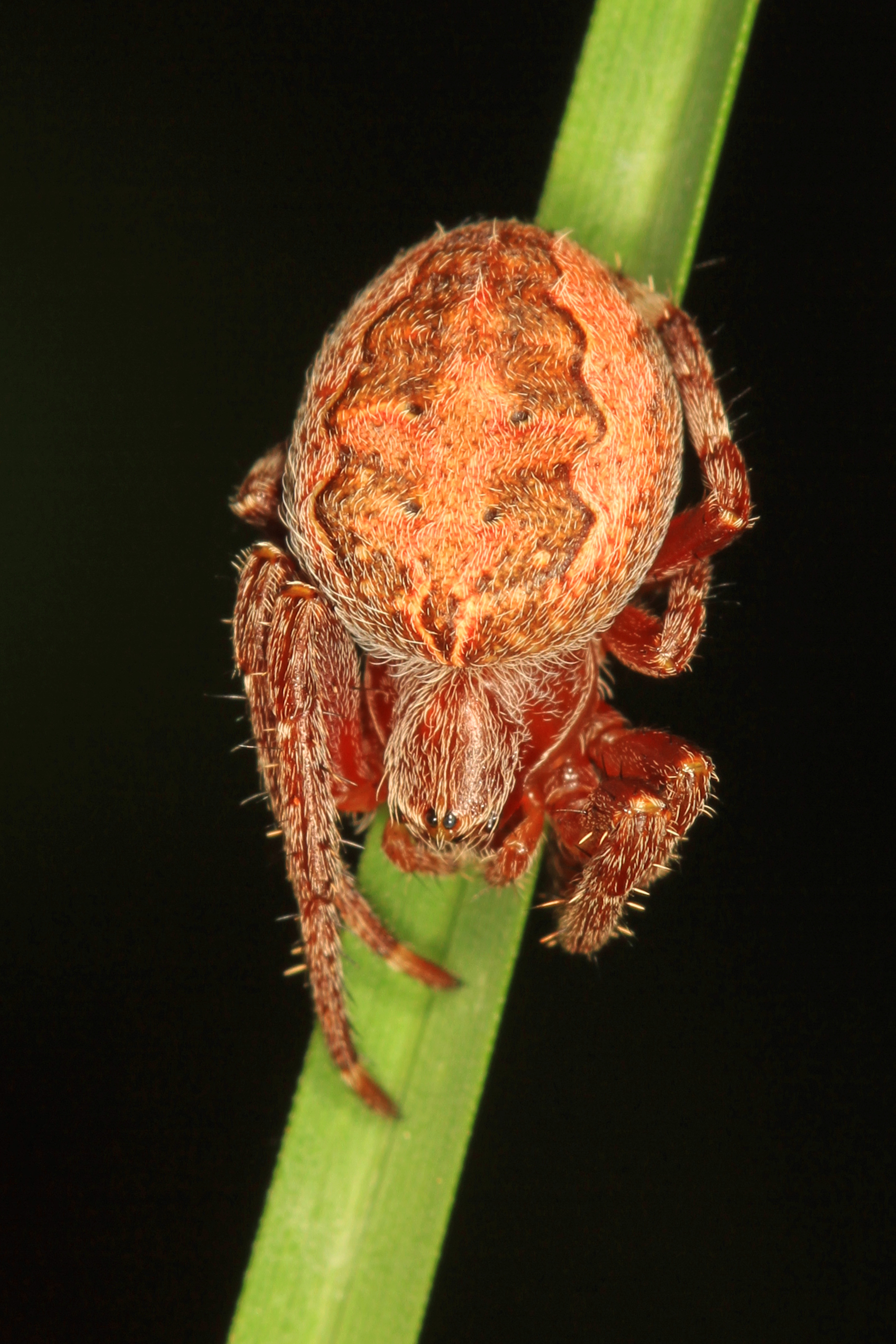
- L. patagiatus

Scientific classification
- Kingdom: Animalia
- Phylum: Arthropoda
- Subphylum: Chelicerata
- Class: Arachnida
- Order: Araneae
- Infraorder: Araneomorphae
- Family: Araneidae
- Genus: Larinioides; Caporiacco, 1934

Type species
- L. suspicax (O. Pickard-Cambridge, 1876)

Species
- 7, see text

= Larinioides =

Genus of spiders

Larinioides is a genus of orb-weaver spiders first described by Lodovico di Caporiacco in 1934. They mostly occur in temperate climates around the northern hemisphere. The name is derived from the related araneid spider genus Larinia, with the meaning "like Larinia".

== Species ==
As of November 2026 it contains seven species:

- Larinioides chabarovi (Bakhvalov, 1981) – Russia (Central Siberia to Far East)
- Larinioides cornutus (Clerck, 1757) – North America, Europe, Turkey, Israel, Caucasus, Russia (Europe to Far East), Iran, China, Korea, Japan, Northern Africa
- Larinioides ixobolus (Thorell, 1873) – Western Europe to Central Asia
- Larinioides jalimovi (Bakhvalov, 1981) – Russia (Far East), Korea
- Larinioides patagiatus (Clerck, 1757) – North America, Europe, Turkey, Caucasus, Russia (Europe to Far East), Central Asia, China, Mongolia, Japan, Tunisia, Libya
- Larinioides sclopetarius (Clerck, 1757) – Europe, Morocco Caucasus, Russia (Europe to Central Asia), Kazakhstan, China, Korea. Introduced to North America
- Larinioides suspicax (O. Pickard-Cambridge, 1876) – Europe, North Africa to Central Asia
