= Charlotte's Web 2: Wilbur's Great Adventure =

- DVD cover
- Directed by: Mario Piluso
- Screenplay by: Elana Lesser; Cliff Ruby
- Based on: Characters created by E. B. White
- Produced by: James Wang
- Starring: Julia Duffy; David Berón; Charlie Adler; Amanda Bynes
- Edited by: Christopher Hink
- Music by: Michael Tavera
- Production companies: Universal Home Entertainment Productions; Paramount Pictures Corporation; Nickelodeon Animation Studio
- Distributed by: Paramount Home Entertainment (North America); Universal Pictures Video (International)
- Release date: March 18, 2003
- Running time: 79 minutes
- Country: United States
- Language: English

Charlotte's Web 2: Wilbur's Great Adventure is a 2003 American animated direct-to-video musical adventure film. The sequel to the 1973 film Charlotte's Web (itself based on the children's novel Charlotte's Web by E.B. White), the film is a co-production between Universal Home Entertainment Productions and Paramount Pictures Corporation, with Nickelodeon Animation Studio handling production services, and Paramount Home Entertainment and Universal Pictures Video respectively handling North American and overseas distribution.

The film centers around Wilbur, who lives on Homer Zuckerman's farm and is taking care of Nellie, Aranea and Joy (Charlotte's three daughters). He also must save his new friend, a friendly black lamb named Cardigan, from being eaten by an evil fox named Farley.

Charlotte's Web 2: Wilbur's Great Adventure was released on March 18, 2003, to negative reviews from critics, with criticism for its animation, voice acting, and plot.

== Plot ==
The film opens in springtime, the year after Charlotte has died. Her three daughters, Nellie, Aranea, and Joy, are now in the stages of adolescence, with Wilbur serving as a companion and mentor.

During this time, Wilbur befriends Cardigan, a newborn lamb that is frowned upon and made fun of by the other lambs and the younger sheep of his flock because he has black wool. Wilbur takes Cardigan under his wing and shows him the farm, the ways of animal life, and dangers to look out for. However, after only a few weeks, Farmer Zuckerman suddenly sells Cardigan to another farmer, so Wilbur, along with Nellie, Aranea, Joy, and Templeton, set out to visit Cardigan and make sure he is safe; Templeton requires Wilbur to babysit his children in return for guidance.

On the journey to visit Cardigan, however, Wilbur is hungry so he gets some blackberries which make him look purple. He then gets his foot tangled in some brambles which Templeton frees him from (under the promise that Wilbur will babysit the rat kids for an additional two weeks). Some bark from the trees comes and lands on Wilbur's head. This makes him look like a wild pig. A near hit by a truck then reveals that two other guys have now seen the wild pig. This makes it hard for Wilbur to visit Cardigan.

Meanwhile, an evil fox named Farley comes and steals a hen from the barn, and Wilbur is framed for the attack after trying to stop him. Farley comes back, steals Cardigan from the barn, and plans to eat him. Wilbur now must save his friend, and does so by trapping Farley in a "pig web". Nellie, Aranea, and Joy spin the word "fox" in a spider web, and Fern arrives just in time to save Wilbur. Aranea and Joy decide to stay with Cardigan, and the film ends as Wilbur has to babysit Templeton's children.

== Voice cast ==
- Julia Duffy as Charlotte A. Cavatica, Wilbur's best friend who died at the end of the first film. She appears briefly in flashbacks.
- David Berón as Wilbur, a pig who lives on Homer's farm and is taking care of Charlotte's three daughters, Nellie, Aranea, and Joy. He still has anxiety as in the first film. He befriends Cardigan, a lonely lamb. When Cardigan is sold to another farmer, Wilbur sets out to make sure he is still safe.
- Charlie Adler as Templeton, a carefree, egotistical rat who lives at Homer's farm. He has four bratty children of his own: Henrietta, Lester, Ralphie, and Junior. He accompanies Wilbur, Nellie, Aranea, and Joy on the journey to visit Cardigan on the condition that Wilbur babysits his bratty children.
  - Adler also voices Lurvy, Homer's assistant.
- Amanda Bynes as Nellie, one of Charlotte's three daughters. She serves as their leader.
  - Mimi Manners provides Nellie’s singing voice.
- Anndi McAfee as Joy, the cynical, sarcastic member of the trio.
- Maria Bamford as Aranea, the kinder, gentler member of the trio. She always gets disappointed due to being unable to spin a proper web.
  - Bamford also voices Button, Mrs. Hirsch's spoiled pet dog.
- Harrison Chad as Cardigan, a lonely lamb whom Wilbur befriends. When Mr. Zuckerman decides to sell Cardigan to another farmer, Wilbur becomes determined to see him again. Later, Wilbur has to save him from being eaten by Farley.
- Rob Paulsen as Farley, an evil, pompous fox responsible for the loss of many chickens and eggs from various farms.
  - Paulsen also voices Fern's father, Mr. John Arable.
- Debi Derryberry as Fern Arable, the spirited young girl who saved Wilbur in the first film. She enters the tomato-growing contest at the fair.
- Laraine Newman as Gwen, the goose who Wilbur befriended in the first film. She has a noticeably smaller role this time around.
  - Newman also voices Mother Sheep
- Dawnn Lewis as Bessie, a cow owned by Mr. Hirsch. She gets annoyed easily but also learns to like Wilbur because he was the only one to find her milk tastes good.
  - Lewis also voices the Female contest judge at the fair who gives the prize tomato.
- Danny Mann as Mr. Conrad Hirsch, the farmer who buys Cardigan.
- Brenda Vaccaro as Mrs. Sally Hirsch, Mr. Hirsch's wife who mistakes Wilbur for a wild pig.
- Jerry Houser as Mr. Homer Zuckerman, the current owner of Wilbur and former owner of Cardigan.
- Valery Pappas as High Strung Chicken
- Nika Futterman as Baby Rats, Templeton's bratty children, named: Henrietta, Lester, Ralphie, and Junior.
- Bridget Sienna as Flo, a snobby cow who mocks Bessie for producing sour milk.
- Bobby Block as Snotty Lamb
- Ashley Edner as Bully Lamb
- Pat Fraley as Donkey
- Frank Welker as Animals' vocal effects

== Reception ==
Upon release, Charlotte's Web 2: Wilbur's Great Adventure received generally unfavorable reviews from critics. Robert Pardi of TV Guide reviewed the film saying that "This 20-years-later follow-up fails to capture the zest of the original cartoon, transforming E.B. White's beloved characters into cute sidekicks worthy of Barney. The animation is only workmanlike, and the character conceptions are as pallid as the "original" tunes". Brian Webster of Apollo Guide gave the film 59/100, stating "This is the sort of bland adventure that kids will have seen a hundred times before, with not-so-tense near-misses and not-so-exciting chases along the way." Mike Long of DVD Talk opined that "The lame story isn't helped by the mediocre at best animation. The art has no real style and could have come from any Saturday morning cartoon. The colors are good, but they only draw attention to the overall lack of detail here. For some reason, Wilbur has been given a ring of fur around his neck that keeps him from looking like the pig from the original film. Also, the Fern here looks nothing like the original. Typically, if an animated film is dull, viewers can hope for good animation to keep them entertained, but that's not the case here." Entertainment Weekly's Allyssa Lee gave the movie a C− grade, writing, "A sloppy second of a sequel, Web 2 unravels all the charm of E.B. White’s classic (not only has Wilbur become a swine who belches, but he sings about it, too)."

Richard Rowell of lifesuccessfully.com wrote a mixed review and concluded that "Overall, this film would have never done very well had it not been packaged with the DVD release of the original film. It was a direct-to-DVD film and it shows. While it makes for a cute spectacle for fans of the original story, it has all sorts of plot-holes that kill it for me. It's clear that there was some effort put into character development, and I did enjoy seeing Aranea, Joy, and Nellie come to life. They were the best part of the film for me. But overall, the film was so corny and cliched that it just can't hold a candle to the original. For what it is, though, it's OK. But unless you're a huge fan of the original story, it's not really worth watching." Jules Faber of dvd.net similarly called it "A disappointing excursion that merges old school with new school and succeeds in distancing itself from both. There are plenty of characters to amuse the children, but as far as grown-ups are concerned, this is less than plausible. Bunches of pretty colours and some beautiful backgrounds were the highlight here for me and are also sure to capture the kids’ eye for the entire 80 minutes. I’ve seen better animation in better packages, but I’ve also seen much, much worse for around the same money." Mirella Roche-Parker of michaeldvd.com rated it with 1.5/5 stars with the final comment "Who can know the minds of children when it comes to children's movies? If your particular batch of little'uns enjoyed the original, they may very well enjoy this. For my taste, it simply made me miss the original more." The DVD made a cumulative gross of $5.26 million in rental revenue and $10.23 million in its total first quarter.

== Soundtrack ==
A soundtrack available on MCA Records on March 18, 2003, reissued in early 2004 on Geffen Records.

- "It's Not So Hard to Be a Pig" – Written and produced by Michele Brourman and Amanda McBroom, Performed by David Berón and Harrison Chad
- "Watch Out, Wilbur the Pig!" – Written and produced by Michele Brourman and Amanda McBroom, Performed by Kevin Dorsey and Elizabeth Lamers
- "It's Good to Be Me" – Written and produced by Michele Brourman and Amanda McBroom, Performed by Rob Paulsen
- "Charlotte's Kids" – Written and produced by Michele Brourman and Amanda McBroom, Performed by Anndi McAfee, Maria Bamford, and Mimi Manners
