= Mirko Hanák =

Mirko Hanák (26 June 1921 in Turčiansky Svätý Martin — 4 November 1971 in Prague) was a Czech painter, graphic artist and illustrator. He became famous mainly for his distinctive illustrations and lithographs with natural themes. The theme of his drawings and prints were often wild animals coming from the Czech countryside. Hanák was inspired by his life and visits to many areas including Turčiansky Svätý Martin (from 1951 known as Martin) in Slovakia and the Czech towns of Olomouc and Kroměříž.

He first studied visual arts in Zlín after World War II, then at the Academy of Arts in Prague. He was also an illustrator of a series of fictional works with themes of the natural environment, the author or co-author of calendars, posters, and other single-purpose prints. During World War II, he was forced into the Nazi labour camps after two years of college. He was sent with a friend, and they escaped together in 1944. After the war, he went back to college in Prague, where he studied at the Academy of Arts, Architecture and Design in Prague. It was after his parents moved that he started to paint nature. This would lead him to designing books, where he would win multiple awards. He was inspired by the animals, and published his five books of his drawings in the early 1950s. He died age 50 of leukemia.
