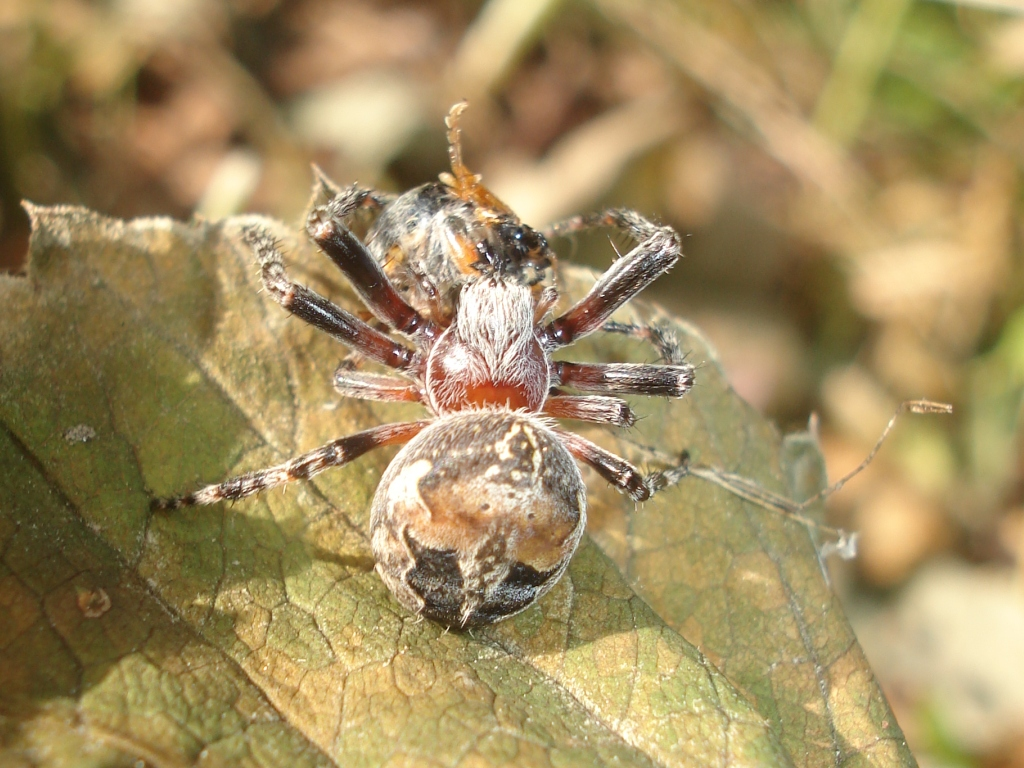

Scientific classification
- Domain: Eukaryota
- Kingdom: Animalia
- Phylum: Arthropoda
- Subphylum: Chelicerata
- Class: Arachnida
- Order: Araneae
- Infraorder: Araneomorphae
- Family: Araneidae
- Genus: Larinioides
- Species: L. patagiatus

Binomial name
- Larinioides patagiatus (Clerck, 1757)

= Larinioides patagiatus =

Species of spider

Larinioides patagiatus is a species of orb weaver in the family Araneidae. It is found in North America, Europe, Turkey, Caucasus, Russia to Central Asia, China, Mongolia, and Japan.

== Subspecies ==
- Larinioides patagiatus islandicola (Strand, 1906)
- Larinioides patagiatus patagiatus (Clerck, 1757)
