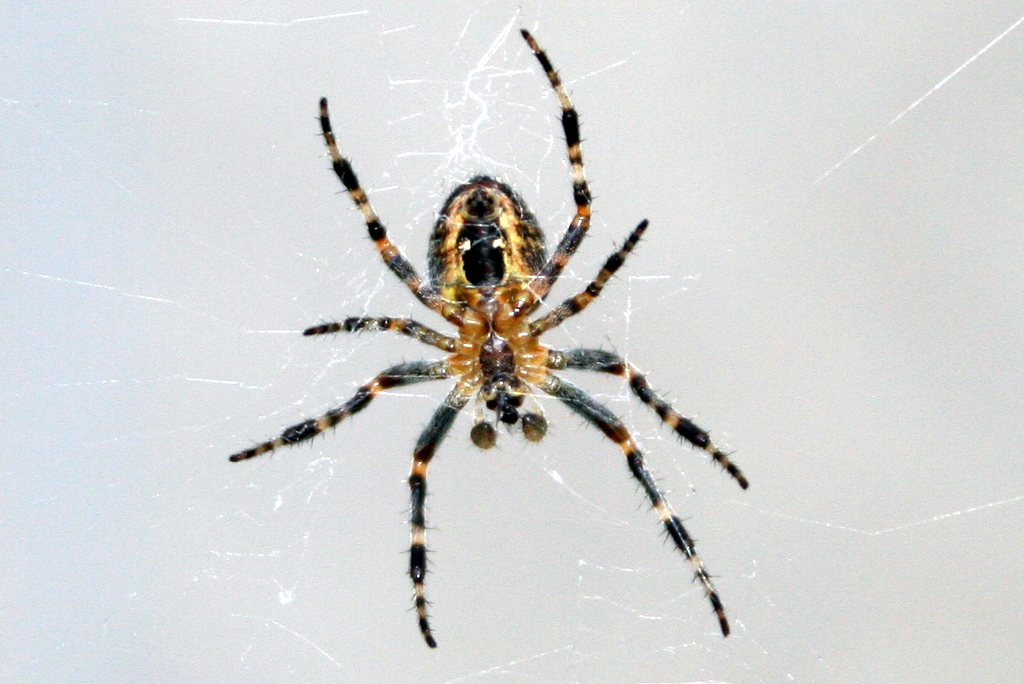

Scientific classification
- Kingdom: Animalia
- Phylum: Arthropoda
- Subphylum: Chelicerata
- Class: Arachnida
- Order: Araneae
- Infraorder: Araneomorphae
- Family: Araneidae
- Genus: Araneus
- Species: A. cavaticus

Binomial name
- Araneus cavaticus (Keyserling, 1882)

Synonyms
- Epeira cavatica Keyserling, 1881; Epeira cinerea Emerton, 1884; Aranea cavatica (Keyserling, 1881)

= Barn spider =

Species of spider

The barn spider (Araneus cavaticus) is a common orb-weaver spider native to North America. They are around three-quarters of an inch (20 mm) in length and are usually yellow and brown in color. They often construct their webs in wooden human structures, hence their common name. The species is notable for being the basis for the character Charlotte in the book Charlotte's Web by American writer E. B. White.

== Description ==
Barn spiders are predominantly yellow and brown in coloration with striped legs. Their undersides are typically black with white marks inside, although color ranges can be quite variable. They are about three-quarters of an inch (20 mm) long but can grow up to and above an inch (25 mm) long with large, round abdomens.

This species displays sexual dimorphism, and, like most orb-weaver spiders, the females are significantly larger than the males.

== Ecology and behavior ==
Barn spiders are nocturnal, constructing (under cover of darkness) a web with symmetrical spokes connected by sticky spirals. They then typically retreat to a nearby silk-lined hiding spot, and wait for an insect to become ensnared. The females are typically the only ones that build webs.

These spiders may or may not have a venomous bite. Their venom is considered non-toxic to most humans on the level of any other non-toxic insect bite. These spiders are aggressive toward each other. They attack each other if in close quarters, though many may inhabit the same structure or area at any given time. They are most commonly found in rafters and wooden structures in suburban and rural structures or areas, and on boats near lakes, thus getting their name, "barn spider".

When agitated (by a puff of air, for instance), these spiders sometimes bounce up and down in the center of their webs, possibly in an attempt to look larger and more threatening. This reaction could be due to their response to vibrations in the web when prey is trapped. Barn spiders shake or sway their webs to instigate further reaction from the prey caught within the web or to confirm that it was debris or other environmental disturbances (fallen leaves, sticks, etc.). They are also able to glean information about the object/insect, through the feel of the web as it shakes. If the spider senses a likely meal has been caught, it moves to it and immediately begins to wrap it with silk.

== Distribution ==
Araneus cavaticus is native to Canada and the United States.

== In popular culture ==
This spider was made well known in Charlotte's Web by E. B. White, with a particularly interesting point that the spider's full name is Charlotte A. Cavatica, a reference to the barn spider's scientific name, Araneus cavaticus. In addition, one of Charlotte's daughters, after asking what her mother's middle initial was, names herself Aranea.
