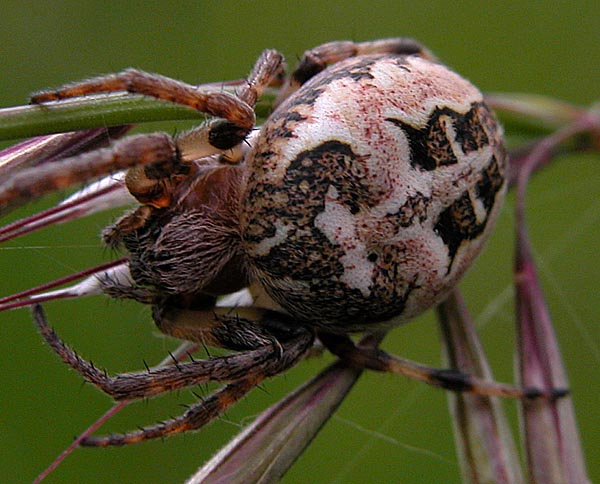

Scientific classification
- Kingdom: Animalia
- Phylum: Arthropoda
- Subphylum: Chelicerata
- Class: Arachnida
- Order: Araneae
- Infraorder: Araneomorphae
- Family: Araneidae
- Genus: Larinioides
- Species: L. cornutus

Binomial name
- Larinioides cornutus (Clerck, 1757)
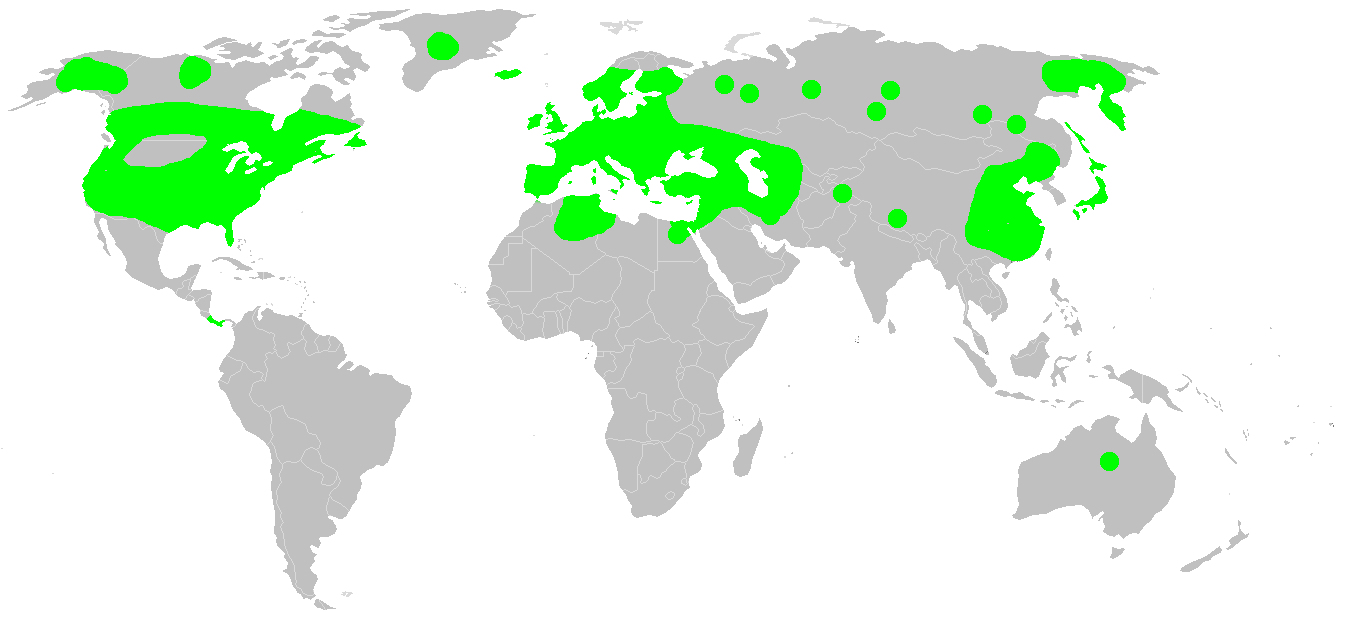

Synonyms
- Aranea apoclisa; Aranea foliata; Aranea frondosa; Aranea leuwenhoekii; Araneus cornutus; Cyphepeira cornuta; Epeica apoclisa; Epeira affinis; Epeira apoclysa; Epeira arundinacea; Epeira cornuta; Epeira foliata; Epeira foliosa; Epeira lyrata; Epeira marmorata; Epeira strix; Epeira tectorum; Epeira tricolor; Epeira vicaria; Larinioides cornuta; Nuctenea cornuta

= Larinioides cornutus =

Species of spider

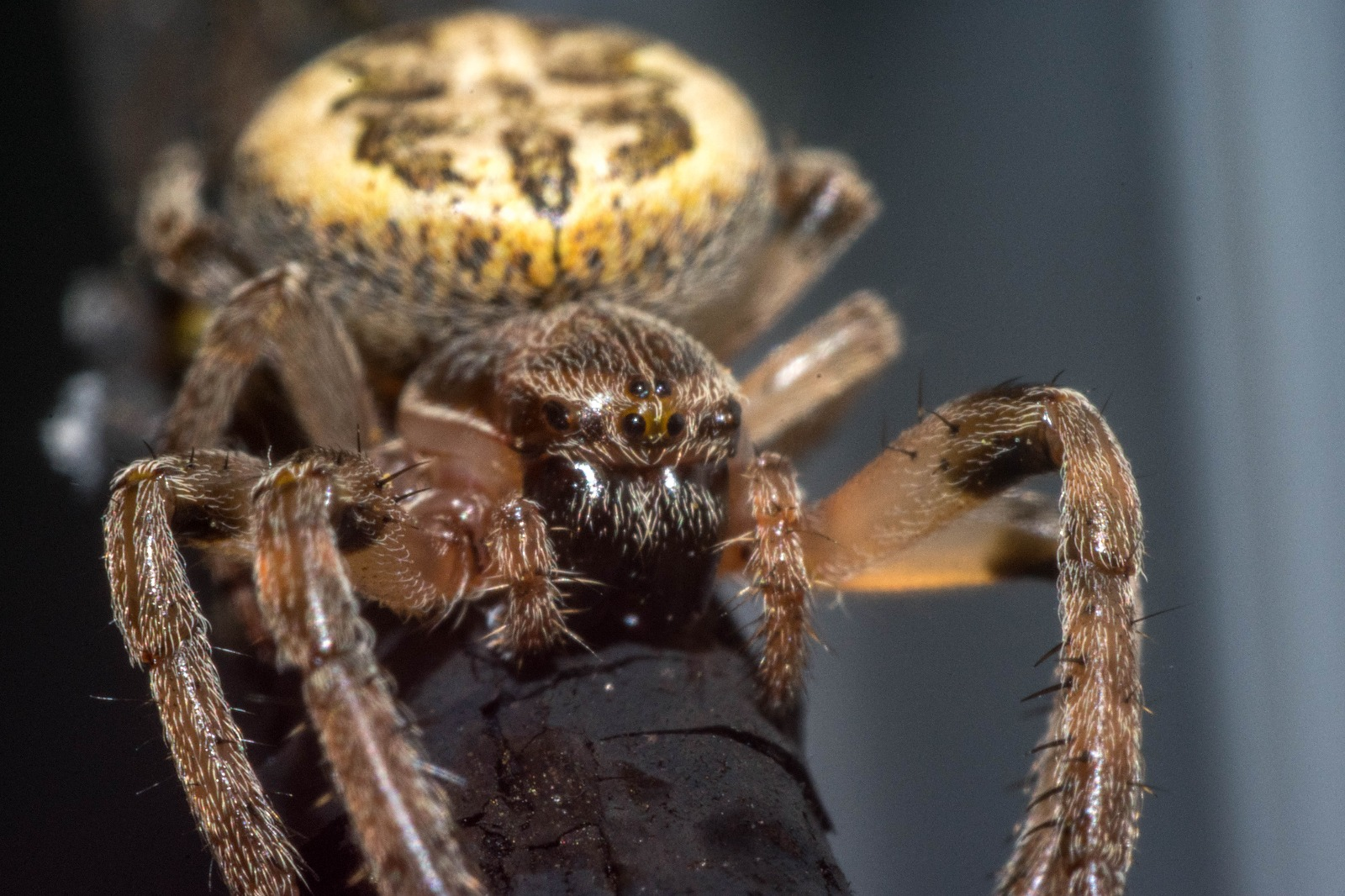
Furrow Orb Weaver found in Northern Kentucky

Larinioides cornutus, the furrow spider, furrow orb spider, or foliate spider is an orb-weaver spider with Holarctic distribution. Orb weaver bites are not especially dangerous for humans, though symptoms include mild pain, numbness, and swelling. Rarely, nausea and dizziness may occur.

== Physical description ==
Females reach a body length of about 6–14 mm, males up to 5–9 mm. Leg spans range from 18 to 35 mm.

These spiders can be identified by their large, oval-shaped, bulbous abdomens. Colors can range from black, grey, and shades of red. The carapace on their abdomen almost always has a lighter shaded arrow pointing toward their cephalothorax, while the legs also have a similar arrow pattern.

Their eye structure consists of a horizontal row of 6 eyes, with an additional pair above the center of the row. A common misconception is that spiders cannot hear, due to their lack of ears or other common structures. However, these animals do have the ability to sense sound due to macrosetae and filiform hairs on their legs.

== Habitat ==
These spiders are most often found in moist areas, especially near water. The web is built between grass or in low shrubbery. They hide during the day in a silken retreat that opens at the bottom, masked with plant and animal matter and leave it during the night. The web is remade in the evening. Unlike many other species of animal and spider, the cornutus does not hibernate in winter, and instead has an annual cycle of seasonal resistance. While their supercooling point in summer is −8 °C, in winter it drops to −20 °C.

== Reproduction ==
Like mating in many other spiders, the females create a silk cocoon for copulation. The females reside in the cocoon, and emit pheromones to lure males, who can sense them through chemoreceptors. The males insert sperm using their pedipalps, and fertilize the eggs of the female. These become yellow egg sacs. Like many other types of spiders, males typically die after mating, oftentimes by being eaten by the female. This evolutionary trait of spiders still remains partially unknown.

The male lives with the female during mating time, which is in autumn and again in spring. The female produces three to five yellow egg sacs during the summer.

There is possibly a distinct species L. folium, which is very similar but occurs in dry habitat.

Larinioides cornutus with prey

== Gallery ==
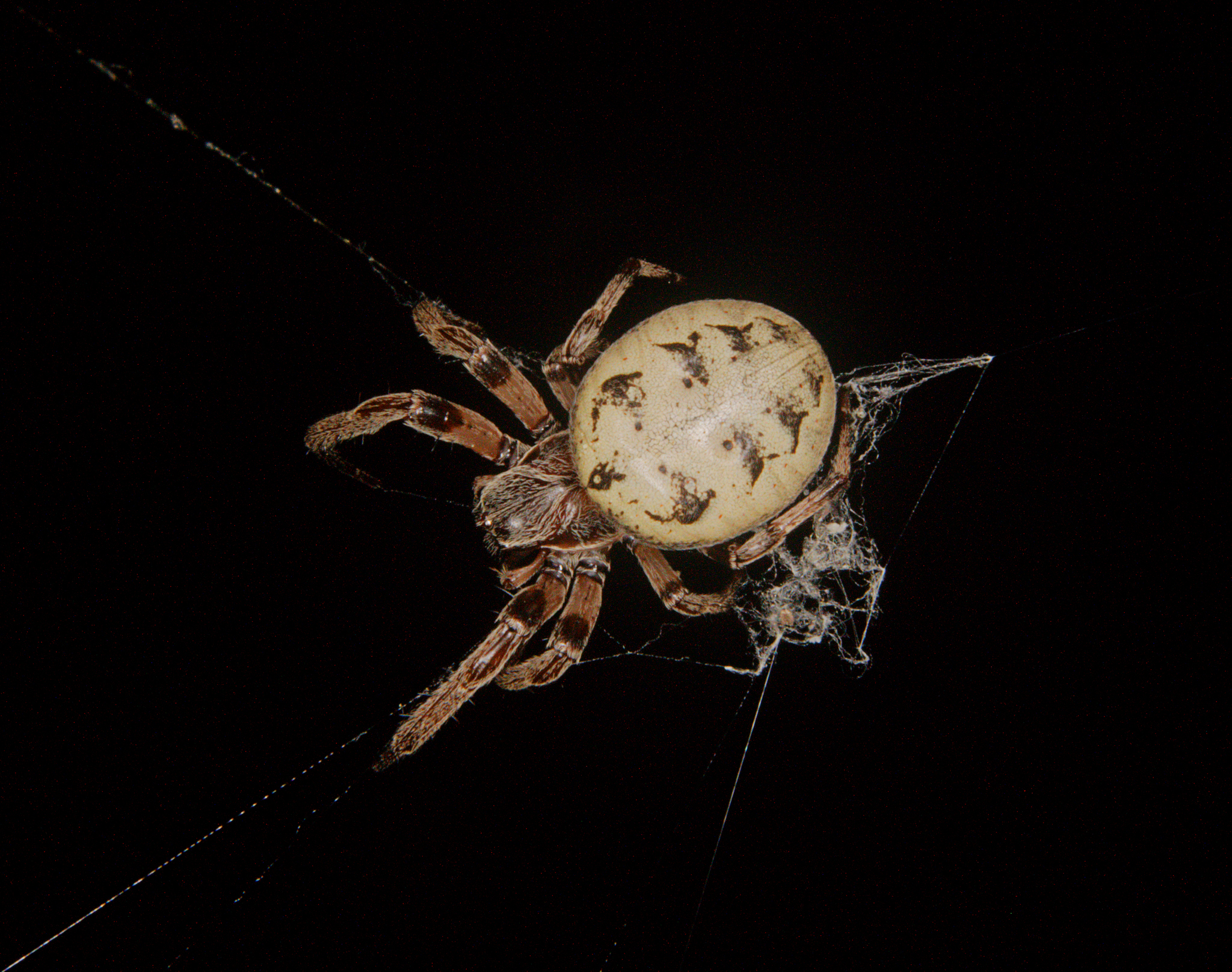
Friday_04-April-2025 Furrow Orb-weaver - Larinioides cornutus in South-Central Kentucky

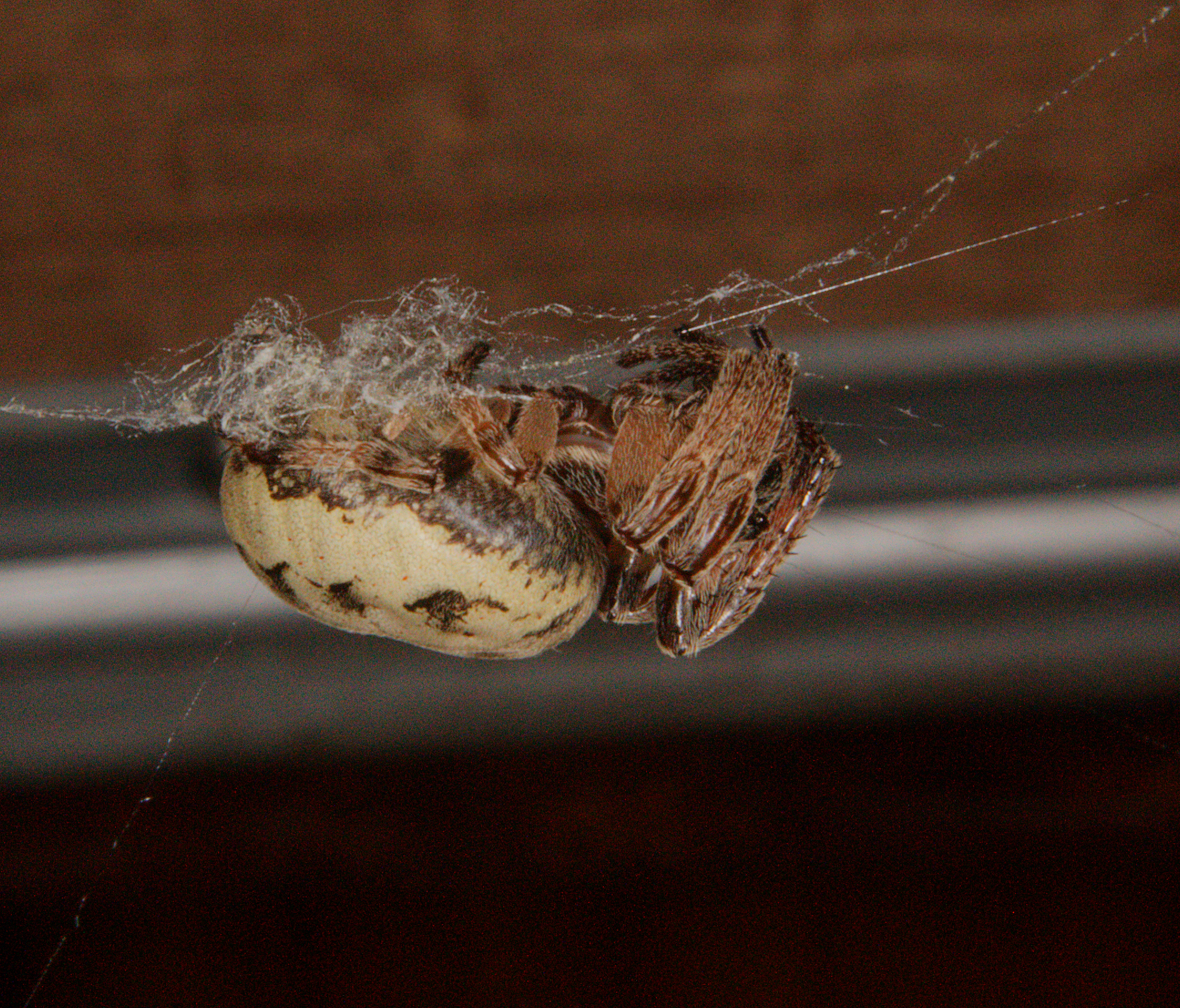
Friday_04-April-2025 Furrow Orb-weaver - Larinioides cornutus in South-Central Kentucky
