= Svenska Spindlar =

1757 arachnology text by Carl Alexander Clerck

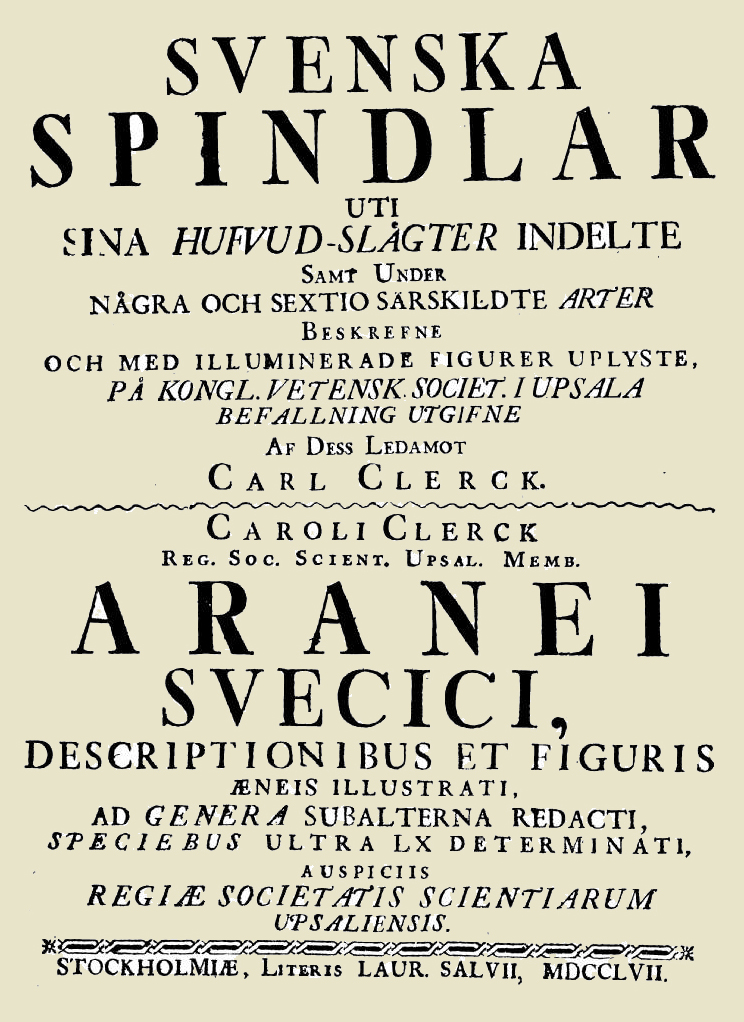
Title page of the 1757 edition of Svenska Spindlar

The book Svenska Spindlar or Aranei Svecici (Swedish and Latin, respectively, for "Swedish spiders") is one of the major works of the Swedish arachnologist and entomologist Carl Alexander Clerck and was first published in Stockholm in the year 1757. It was the first comprehensive book on the spiders of Sweden and one of the first regional monographs of a group of animals worldwide. The full title of the work is Svenska Spindlar uti sina hufvud-slägter indelte samt under några och sextio särskildte arter beskrefne och med illuminerade figurer uplyste – Aranei Svecici, descriptionibus et figuris æneis illustrati, ad genera subalterna redacti, speciebus ultra LX determinati, ("Swedish spiders into their main genera separated, and as sixty and a few particular species described and with illuminated figures illustrated") and included 162 pages of text (eight pages were unpaginated) and six colour plates. It was published in Swedish, with a Latin translation printed in a slightly smaller font below the Swedish text.

Clerck described in detail 67 species of Swedish spiders, and for the first time in a zoological work consistently applied binomial nomenclature as proposed by Carl Linnaeus. Linnaeus had originally invented this system for botanical names in his 1753 work Species Plantarum, and presented it again in 1758 in the 10th edition of Systema Naturae for more than 4,000 animal species. Svenska Spindlar is the only pre-Linnaean source to be recognised as a taxonomic authority for such names.

== Presentation of the spiders ==
Araneus angulatus in Svenska Spindlar

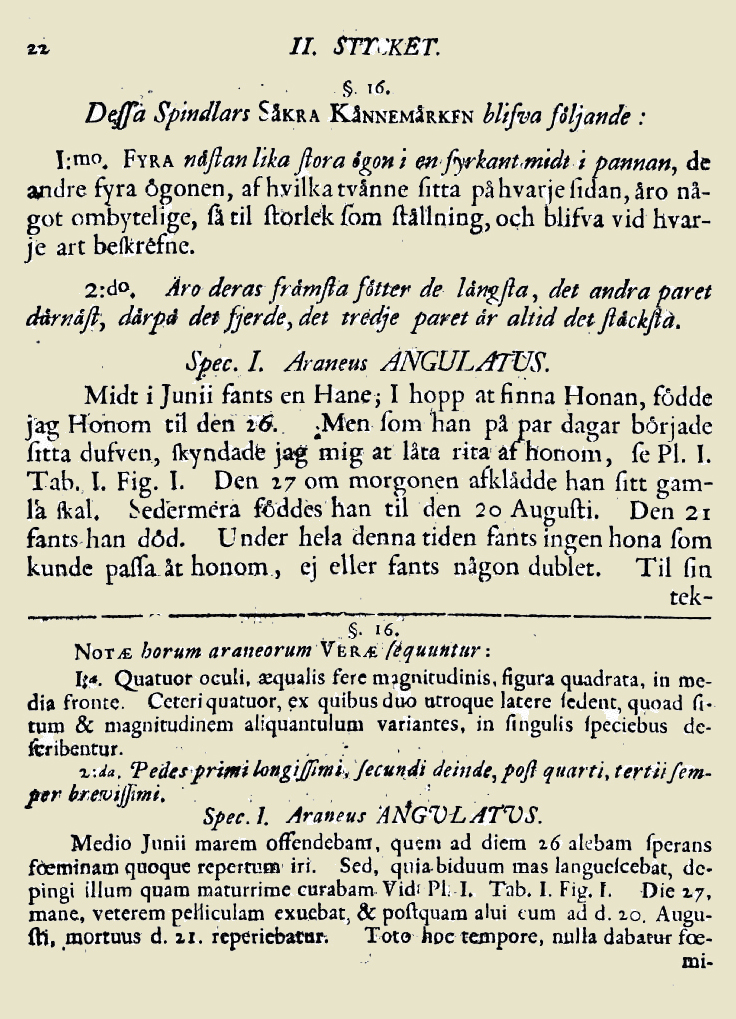
Description of A. angulatus (page 22)

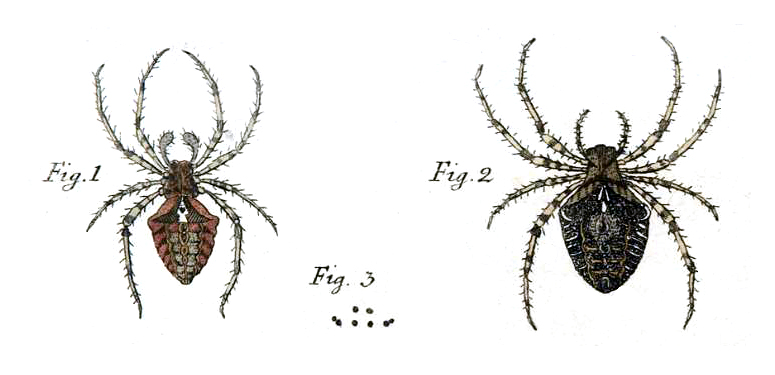
Figure of male and female A. angulatus (plate 1)

Clerck explained in the last (9th of the 2nd part) chapter of his work that in contrast to previous authors he used the term "spider" in the strict sense, for animals possessing eight eyes and separated prosoma and opisthosoma, and that his concept of this group of animals did not include Opiliones (because they had two eyes and a broadly joined prosoma and opisthosoma) and other groups of arachnids.

For all spiders Clerck used a single generic name (Araneus), to which was added a specific name which consisted of only one word. Each species was presented in the Swedish text with its Latin scientific name, followed by detailed information containing the exact dates when he had found the animals, and a detailed description of eyes, legs and body. The differences between the sexes were also described. Each species was illustrated in impressively accurate drawings printed on coloured copper plates which were bound at the end of the volume.

== Impact and importance of the work ==
Because of the exceptionally thorough treatment of the spider species, the scientific names proposed by Clerck (which were adopted by Carl Linnaeus in his Systema Naturae in 1758 with only minor modifications) had traditionally been recognized by arachnologists as binomial and available. In 1959 the ICZN Commission decided that Clerck's work should be available for zoological nomenclature, but the International Code of Zoological Nomenclature did not mention Clerck's work. (Note: The third edition of the ICZN Code (1960) restricted binomial publications to works after 1757.) Only after 1999 was this officially recognized in the Code. This means that in case of doubt the spelling of a spider name as from Clerck's 1757 work has priority over that proposed by Linnaeus in 1758 (an example is Araneus instead of Aranea), and that Clerck's spiders were the first animals in modern zoology to have obtained an available scientific name in the Linnaean system.

== Year 1757 or 1758? ==
In the late 19th century, Clerck's 1757 work was commonly accepted as the first application of binomial nomenclature to spiders. In 1959 the ICZN Commission ruled that the date 1758 should be used for Clerck's names, this date 1758 was repeated to apply to Clerck's names in the 4th edition of the International Code of Zoological Nomenclature in 1999.

In a complete binomial name with author and year, the year corresponds to the year of publication of the original source. Since 2000, the ICZN Code includes an exception to this very basic rule. From the beginning on the new provision in the Code has been misunderstood by many researchers who believed that by setting the date for Clerck's work to 1758 (overriding its true date 1757) and the date for Systema Naturae to 1 January 1758, the priority was changed. In 2007, a case was even brought before the Commission because the researchers were no longer sure whether the generic name should be Araneus Clerck or Aranea Linnaeus. In their judgement the year 1758 for Clerck's Svenska Spindlar could be interpreted in a way that the Linnaean work from 1 January 1758 should have priority. In 2009 the Commission saw itself forced to repeat once more, although this was already explicit in the Code's Article 3.1, that the name Araneus established by Clerck shall have priority and be used for the genus.

== Species ==
Svenska Spindlar lists the following 67 species of spider; their current identities follow Platnick (2000–2010).

Selected species

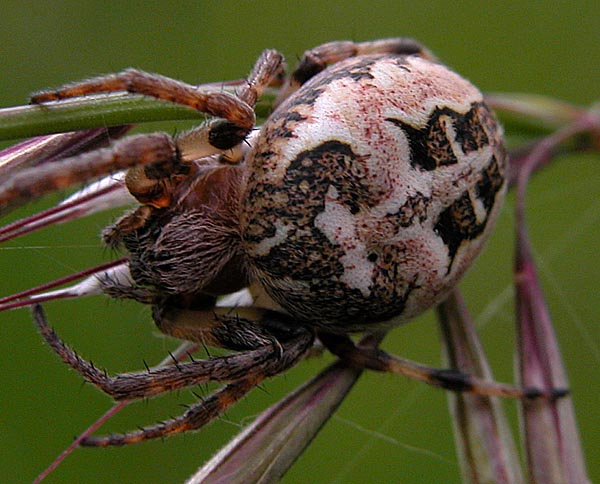
Araneus cornutus

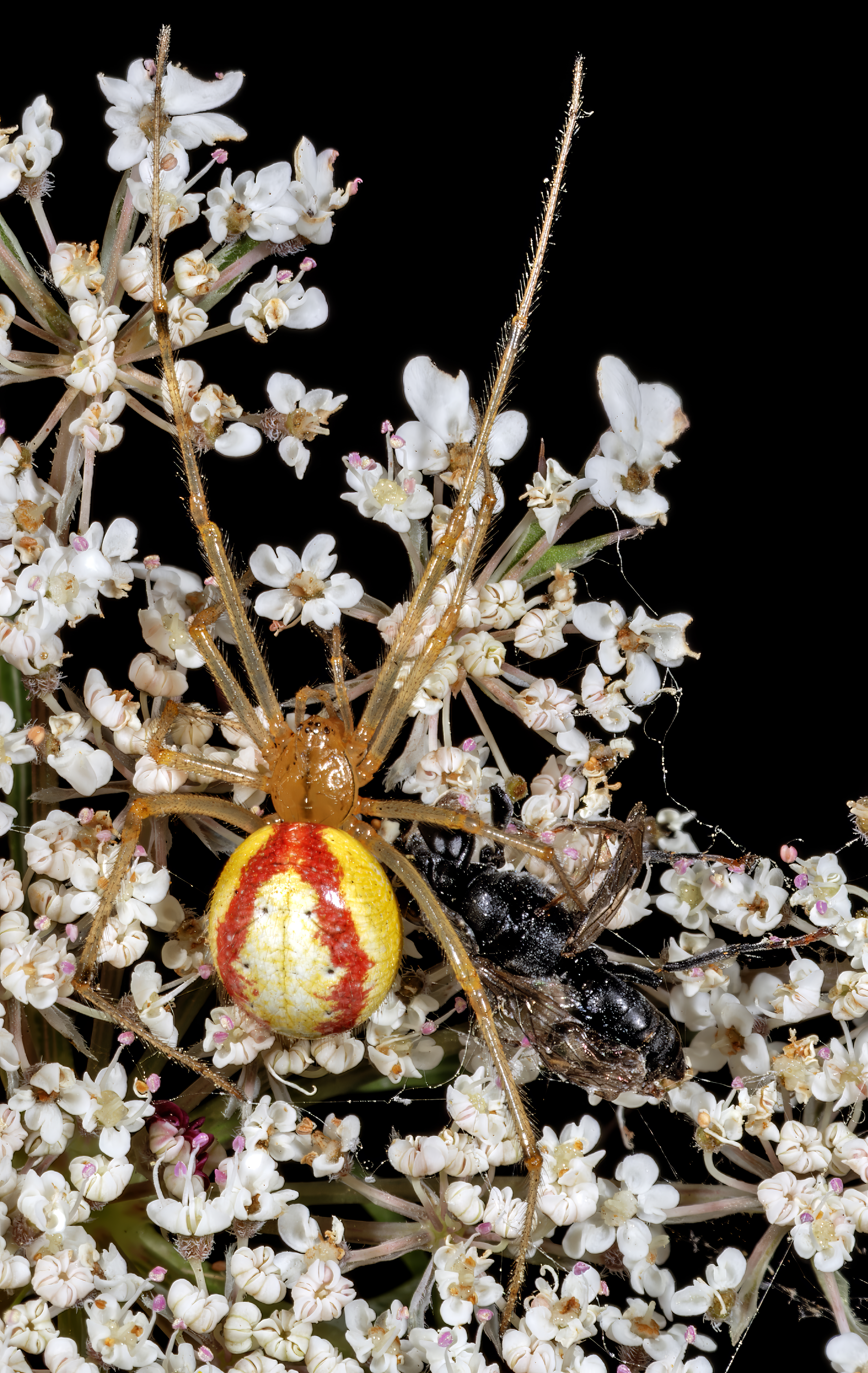
Araneus ovatus

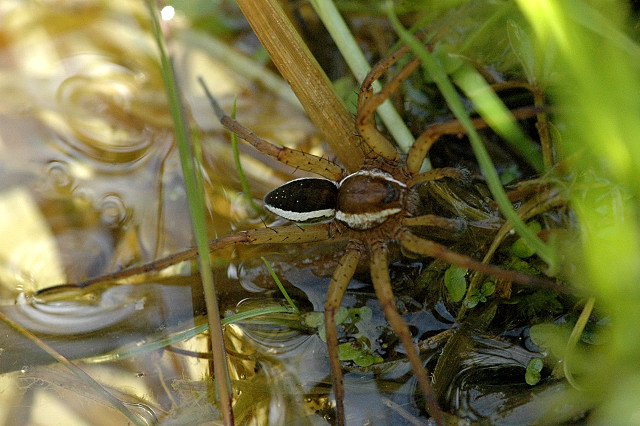
Araneus fimbriatus

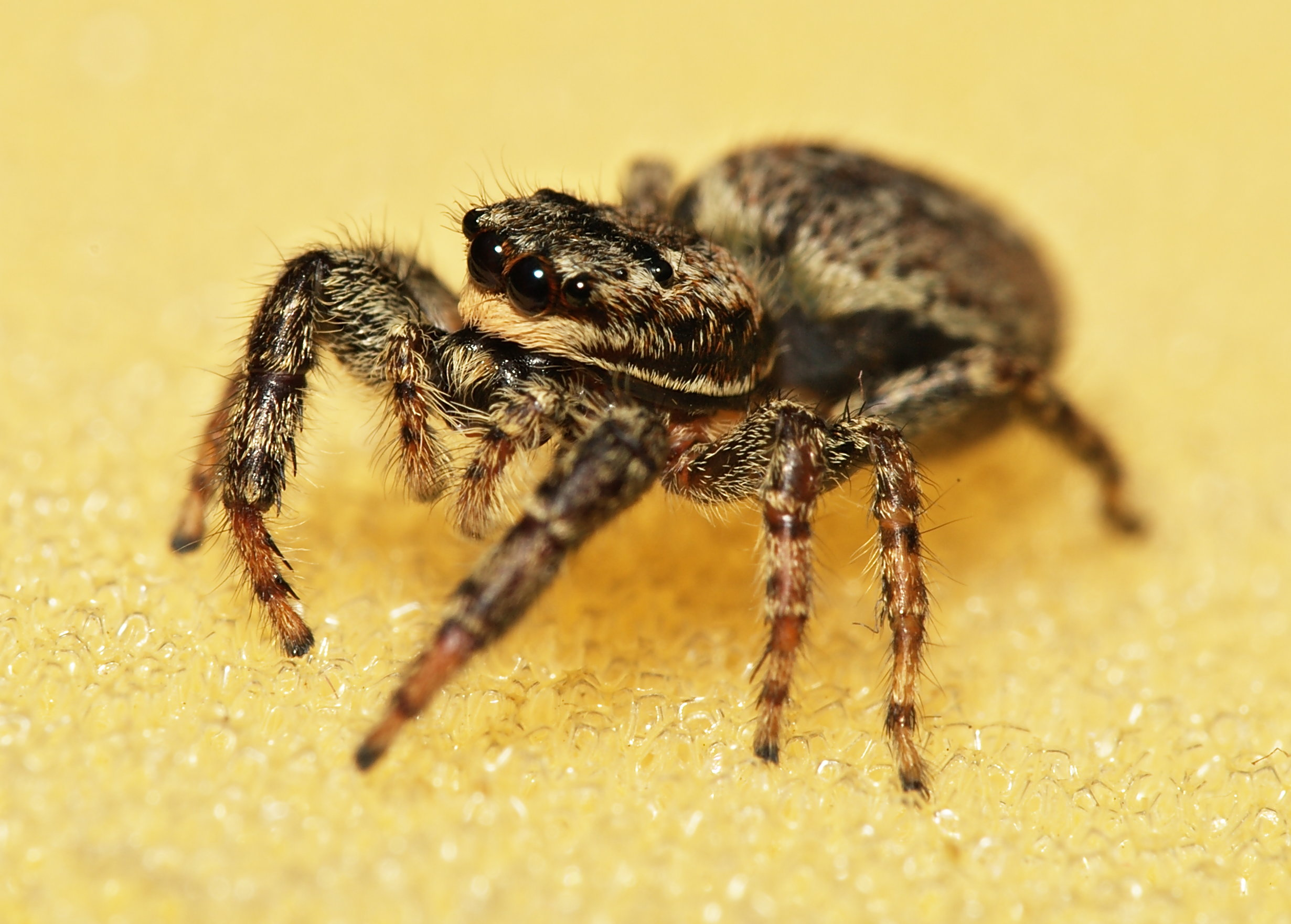
Araneus muscosus

Chapter 2 (Araneidae, Tetragnathidae)

- Araneus angulatus
- Araneus diadematus
- Araneus quadratus
- Araneus marmoreus
- Araneus umbraticus – Nuctenea umbratica
- Araneus pyramidatus – Araneus marmoreus
- Araneus ocellatus – Larinioides patagiatus
- Araneus patagiatus – Larinioides patagiatus
- Araneus cornutus – Larinioides cornutus
- Araneus sericatus – Larinioides sclopetarius
- Araneus sclopetarius – Larinioides sclopetarius
- Araneus cucurbitinus – Araniella cucurbitina
- Araneus segmentatus – Metellina segmentata
- Araneus litera x notatus – Zygiella x-notata

Chapter 3 (Theridiidae, Nesticidae, Linyphiidae)

- Araneus castaneus – Steatoda castanea
- Araneus hamatus – Singa hamata
- Araneus lunatus – Parasteatoda lunata
- Araneus sisyphius – Phylloneta sisyphia
- Araneus formosus – Parasteatoda lunata
- Araneus ovatus – Enoplognatha ovata
- Araneus redimitus – Enoplognatha ovata
- Araneus lineatus – Enoplognatha ovata
- Araneus cellulanus – Nesticus cellulanus
- Araneus bucculentus – Floronia bucculenta
- Araneus montanus – Neriene montana
- Araneus triangularis – Linyphia triangularis

Chapter 4 (Agelenidae, Clubionidae)

- Araneus domesticus – Tegenaria domestica, Malthonica ferruginea
- Araneus labyrinthicus – Agelena labyrinthica
- Araneus pallidulus – Clubiona pallidula

Chapter 5 (Lycosidae, Pisauridae)

- Araneus fabrilis – Alopecosa fabrilis
- Araneus aculeatus – Alopecosa aculeata
- Araneus inquilinus – Alopecosa inquilina
- Araneus lignarius – Acantholycosa lignaria
- Araneus monticola – Pardosa monticola
- Araneus pulverulentus – Alopecosa pulverulenta
- Araneus paludicola – Pardosa paludicola
- Araneus amentatus – Pardosa amentata
- Araneus trabalis – Alopecosa trabalis
- Araneus cuneatus – Alopecosa cuneata
- Araneus undatus – Dolomedes fimbriatus
- Araneus nivalis – Alopecosa inquilina
- Araneus piraticus – Pirata piraticus
- Araneus piscatorius – Pirata piscatorius
- Araneus fumigatus – Pardosa amentata
- Araneus pullatus – Pardosa pullata
- Araneus plantarius – Dolomedes plantarius
- Araneus fimbriatus – Dolomedes fimbriatus
- Araneus mirabilis – Pisaura mirabilis

Chapter 6 (Salticidae)

- Araneus hastatus – Dendryphantes hastatus
- Araneus muscosus – Marpissa muscosa
- Araneus scenicus – Salticus scenicus
- Araneus striatus – [nomen dubium]
- Araneus terebratus – Sitticus terebratus
- Araneus litera v insignitus – Aelurillus v-insignitus
- Araneus litera v notatus – Aelurillus v-insignitus
- Araneus flammatus – [nomen dubium]
- Araneus falcatus – Evarcha falcata
- Araneus arcuatus – Evarcha arcuata

Chapter 7 (Thomisidae, Philodromidae, Sparassidae)

- Araneus vatius – Misumena vatia
- Araneus margaritatus – Philodromus margaritatus
- Araneus aureolus – Philodromus aureolus
- Araneus formicinus – Thanatus formicinus
- Araneus cristatus – Xysticus cristatus
- Araneus roseus – Micrommata virescens
- Araneus virescens – Micrommata virescens

Chapter 8 (Cybaeidae)

- Araneus aquaticus - Argyroneta aquatica
