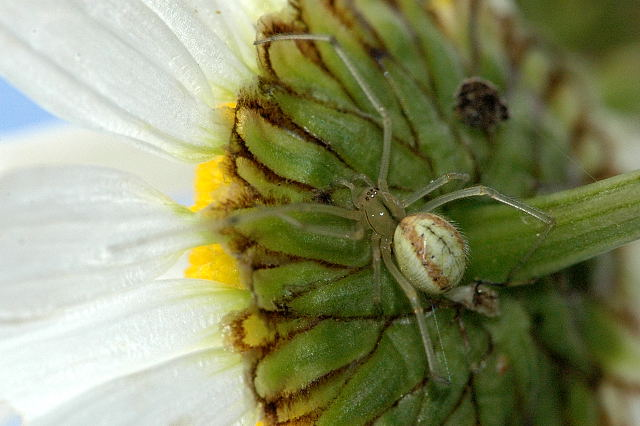
- Female

Scientific classification
- Kingdom: Animalia
- Phylum: Arthropoda
- Subphylum: Chelicerata
- Class: Arachnida
- Order: Araneae
- Infraorder: Araneomorphae
- Family: Theridiidae
- Genus: Enoplognatha
- Species: E. ovata

Binomial name
- Enoplognatha ovata (Clerck, 1757)

= Enoplognatha ovata =

Species of arachnid

Enoplognatha ovata, the common candy-striped spider, is a species of spider belonging to the family Theridiidae. Their scientific name derives from the latin word 'ovatus' which means egg-shaped. Despite its small size, this is a formidable predator which can prey on insects many times its size.

== Description ==
This spider, reaching a length of 6 mm (excluding legs), they have translucent legs and the globular abdomen is extremely variable in colour and pattern: the background colour is usually white, cream or green and can be marked with a row of dark spots, a broad red stripe or with two red stripes in a v-shape. Their coloration can usually be categorized in 3 variations "Lineata" with plant yellow or cream opisthosoma. "Redimita" which has a pair of dorsal red stripes and "Ovata" in which the entire dorsal area is red. The last variation is the rarest, only occurring sporadically in populations.

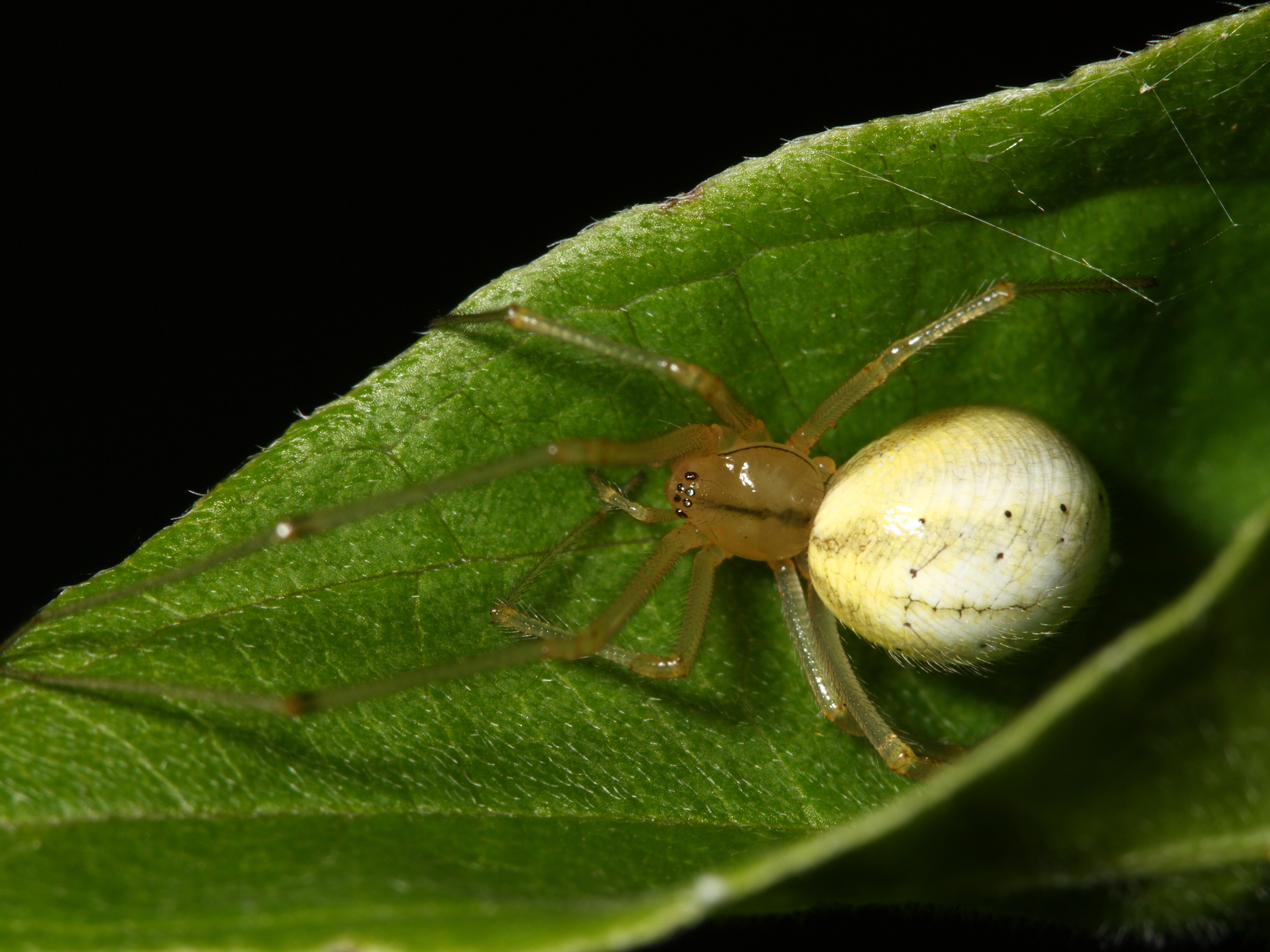
"Lineata" morph

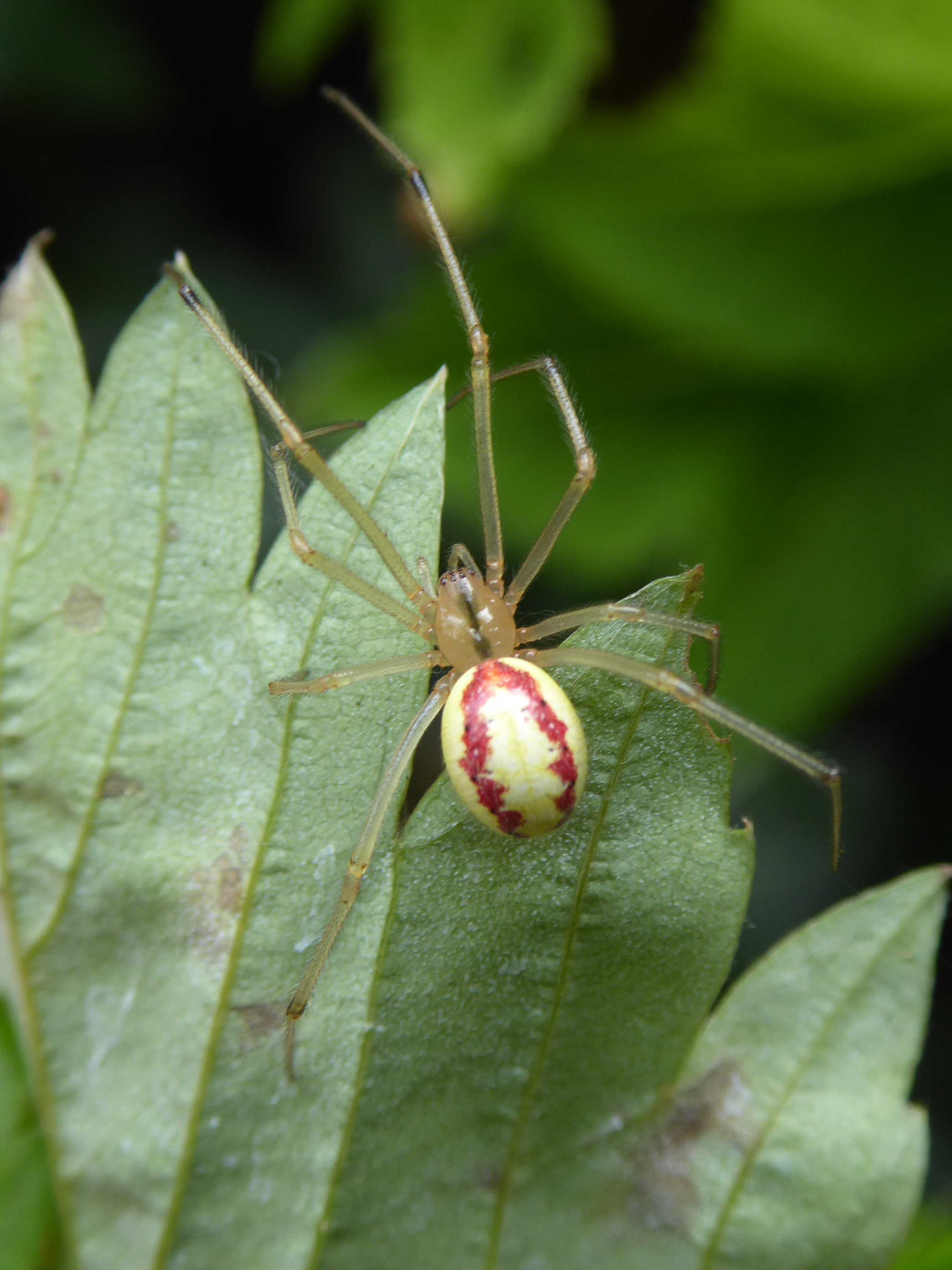
"Redimita" morph

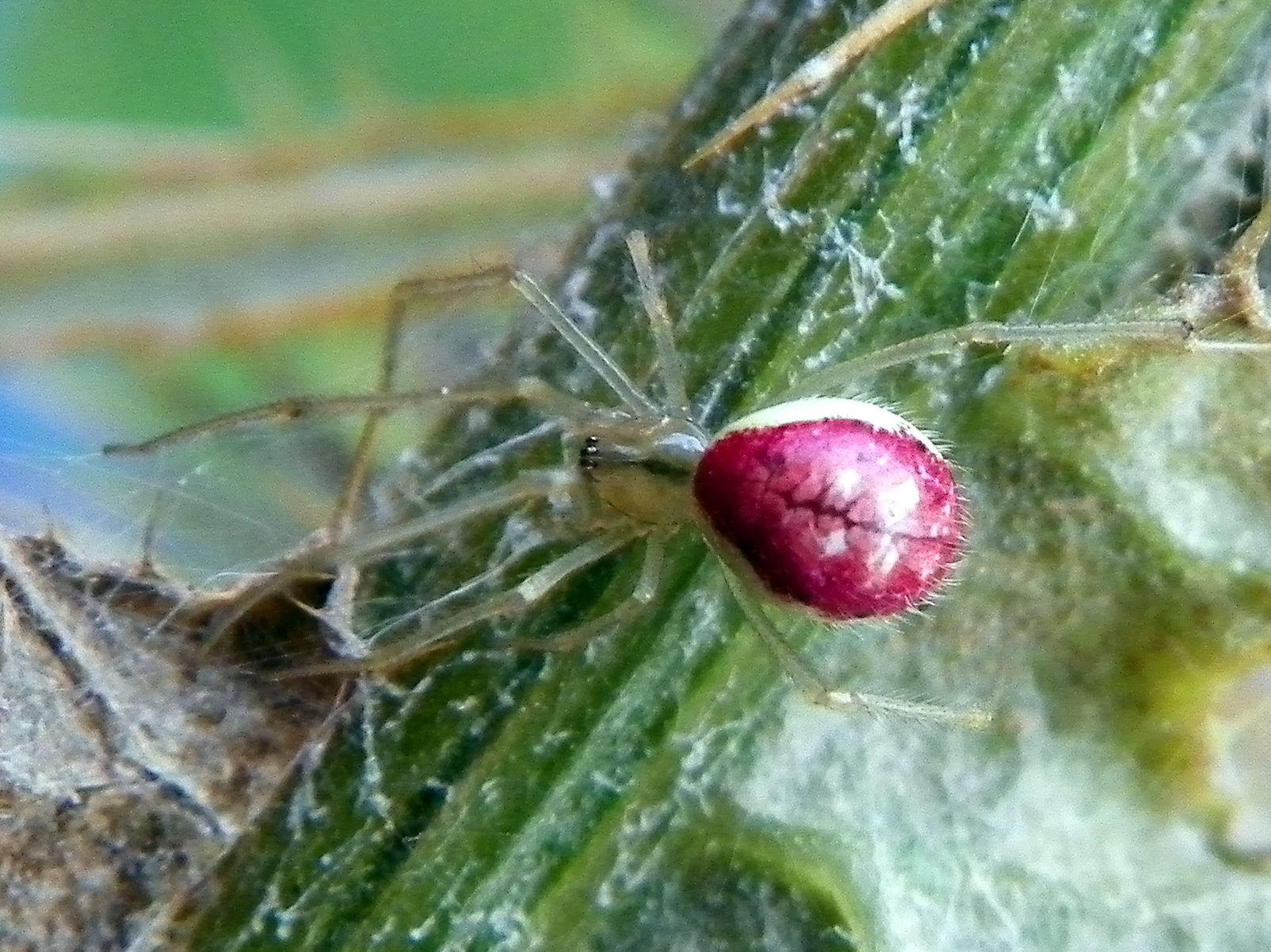
"Ovata" morph

To the naked eye, they are basically indistinguishable from E. latimana, which can only be distinguished by the male palpal bulb and the epigyne of females, in mature spiders. The same patterns mentioned also occur E. latimana, with the "lineata" being the most common of them.

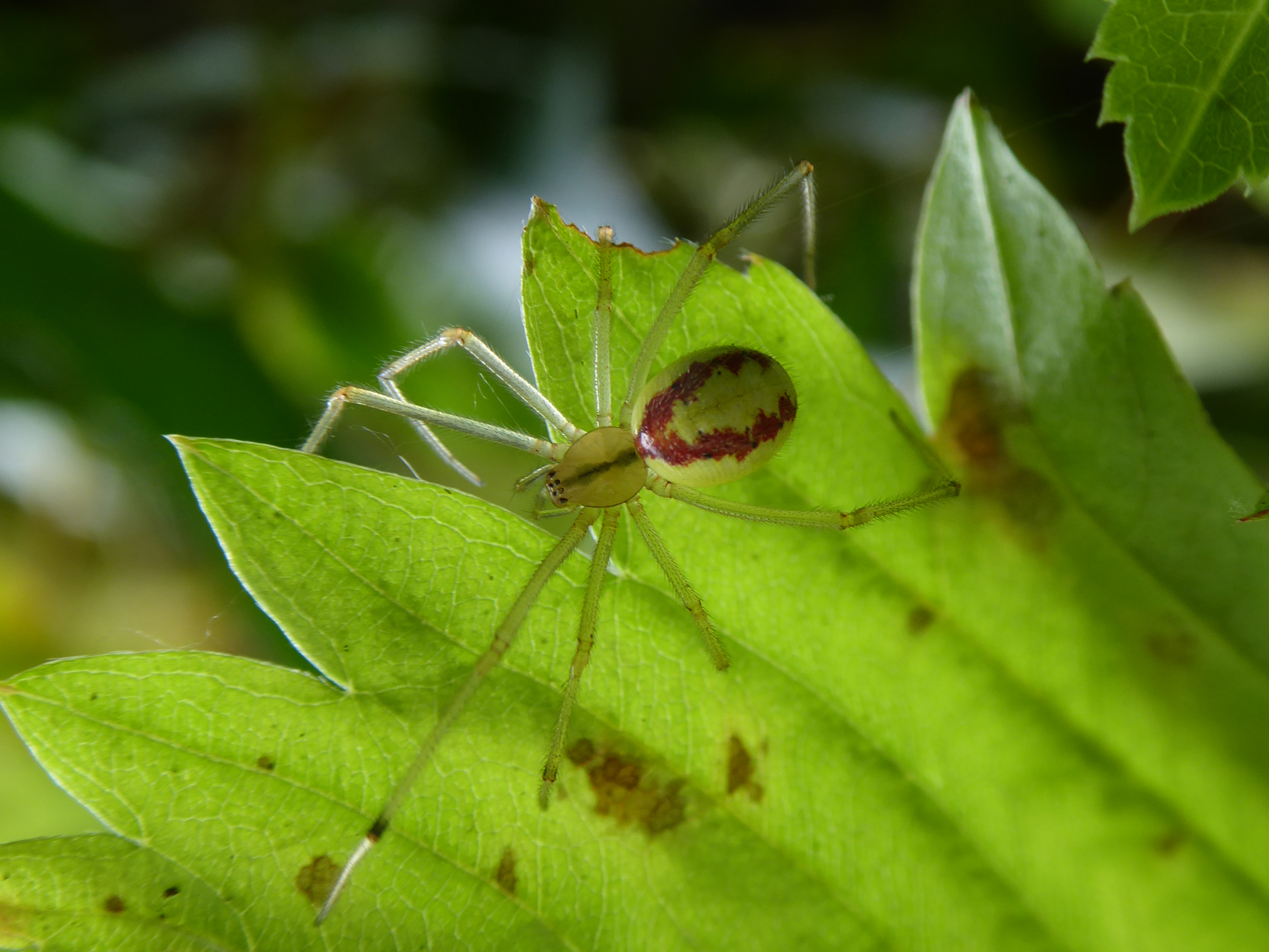
Enoplognatha ovata

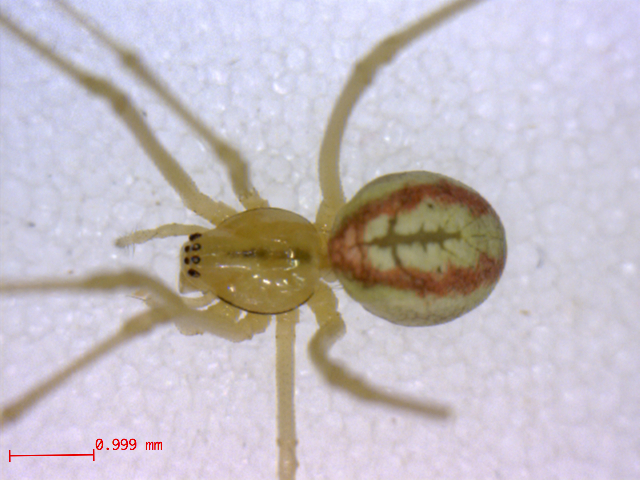
Enoplognatha latimana

== Distribution ==
It is native to Europe and has also been introduced to North America, and it is notably found in Lithuania. In the US it is found from coast to coast, although not as far south as Mexico. It is found in open fields, in forest, and in roadsides, usually found in the underside of leaves and low growing vegetation. Their population usually occurs in dense clumps, sometimes referred to as colonies.

== Ecology ==
The female deposits its eggs in a white sac and after several days the sac gradually changes colour to a blue/grey. This is secreted within a rolled-up leaf fastened with silk and the female guards it until the eggs hatch. Mothers have been observed defending their eggs from predators and even provisioning prey to their baby spiderlings.

Its web is usually a small assortment of tangled threads, found in the underside of a leaf. The edges of said leaf are usually pulled down slightly with the threads, creating a hide. This can also be used to help spot their webs.
