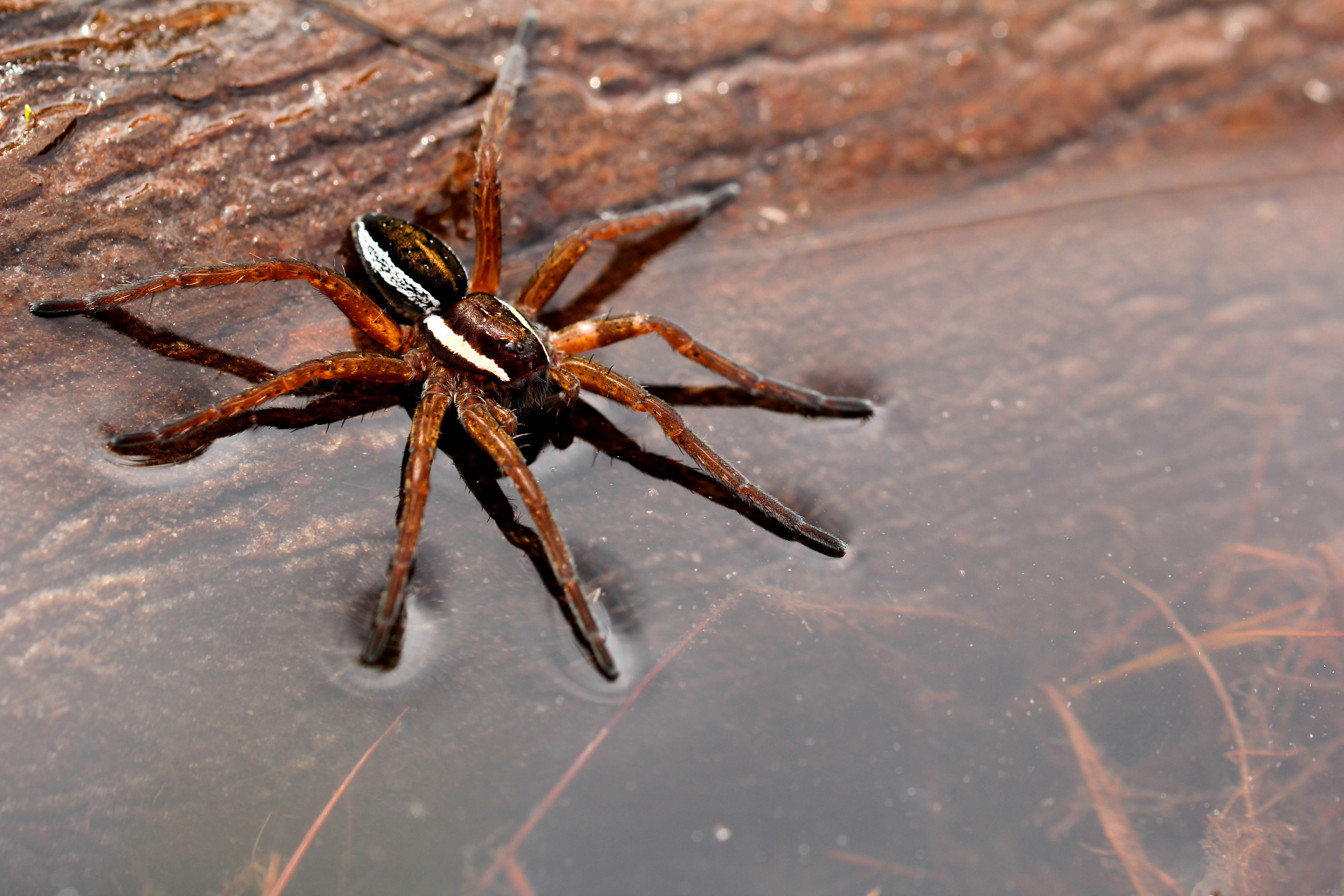
- Raft spider attack position

Scientific classification
- Kingdom: Animalia
- Phylum: Arthropoda
- Subphylum: Chelicerata
- Class: Arachnida
- Order: Araneae
- Infraorder: Araneomorphae
- Family: Dolomedidae
- Genus: Dolomedes
- Species: D. fimbriatus

Binomial name
- Dolomedes fimbriatus (Clerck, 1757)
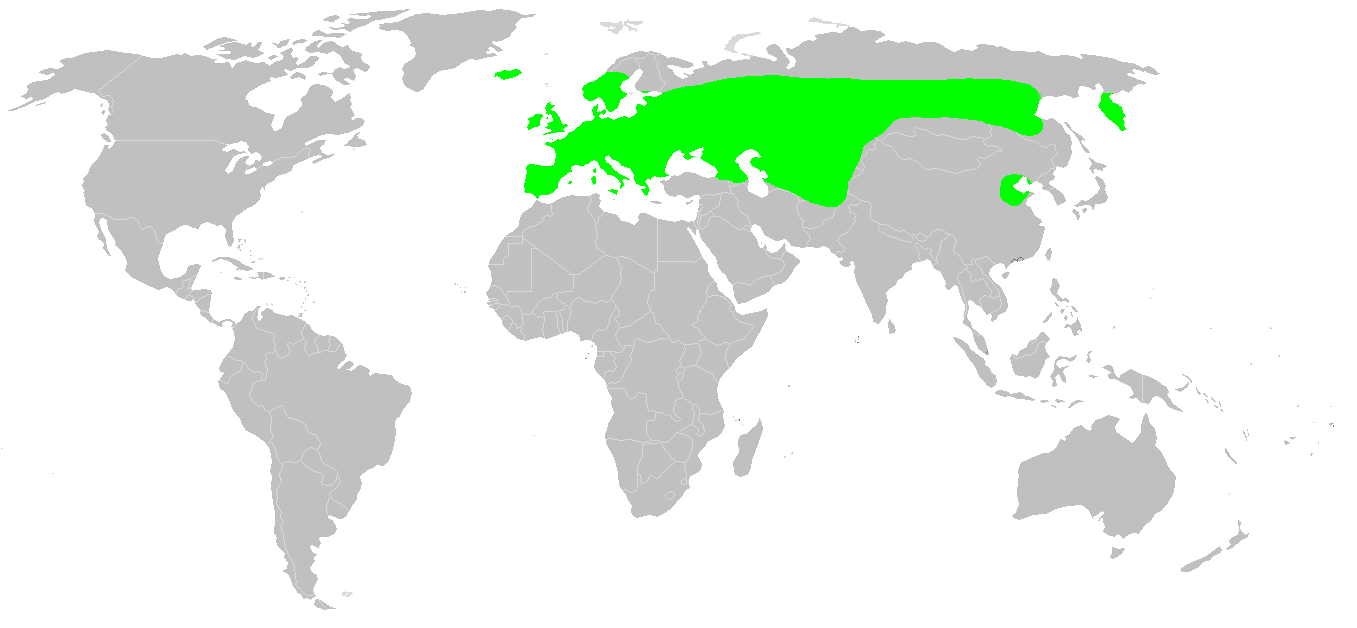

Synonyms
- Araneus fimbriatus Clerck, 1757

= Raft spider =

Species of spider

The raft spider (Dolomedes fimbriatus) is a large semi-aquatic spider of the family Dolomedidae found throughout north-western and central Europe. It is one of only two species of the genus Dolomedes found in Europe, the other being the slightly larger Dolomedes plantarius which is endangered in the UK.

== Habitat and description ==
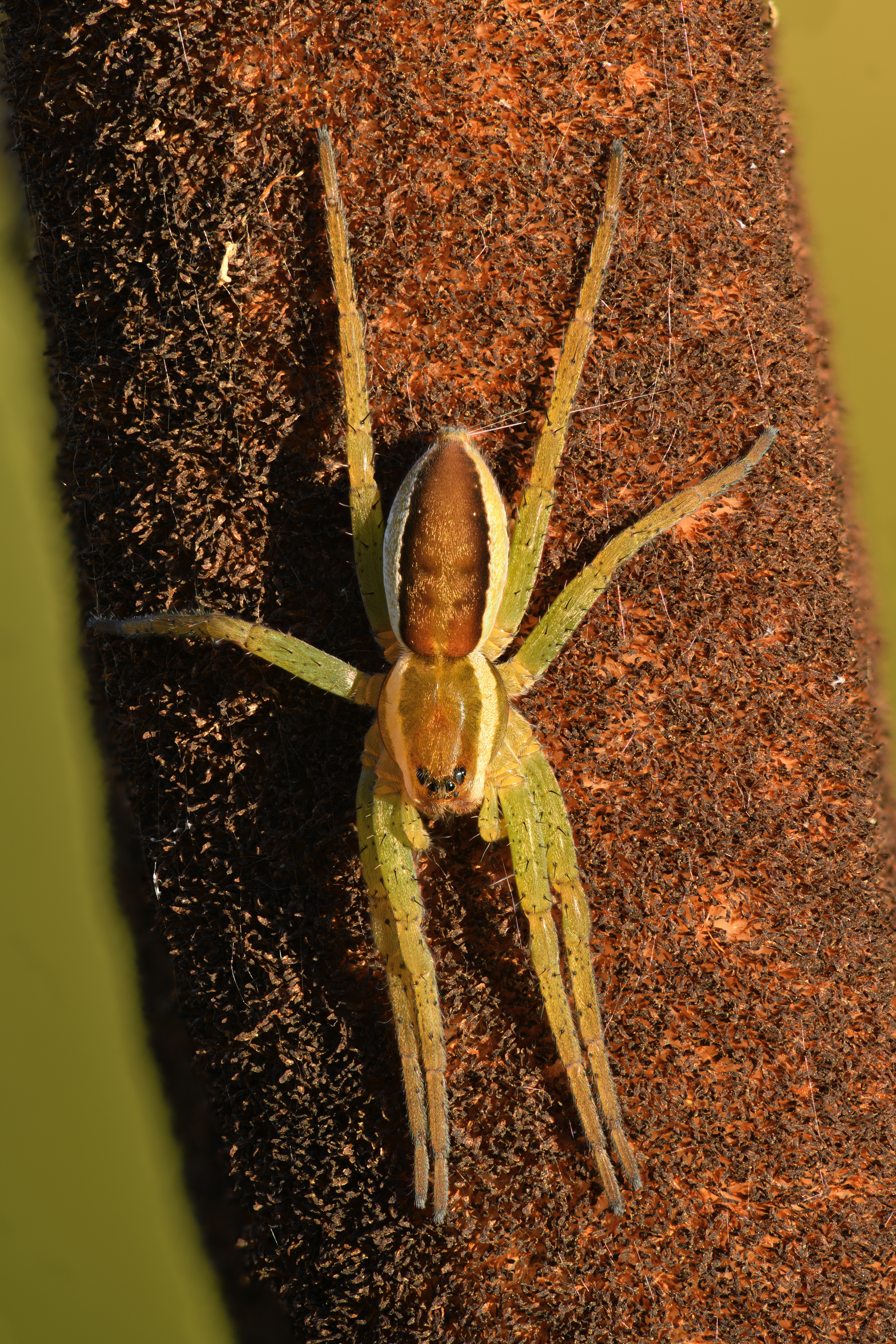
Juvenile raft spider

Raft spiders are semi-aquatic and adults inhabit freshwater wetlands, specifically wet heaths and acid swamps; although juveniles are predominantly found in terrestrial vegetation surrounding wetland areas. Adults are dark brown with a conspicuous white, cream or yellow stripe along both sides of their abdomen and thorax. Juveniles are similar in appearance but often have green translucent legs. As is common in other spiders, female raft spiders (body length: 9–22mm) are usually larger than males (body length (9-15mm). Dolomedes fimbriatus was described in chapter 5 of the book Svenska Spindlar by the Swedish arachnologist and entomologist Carl Alexander Clerck. It is the type species of its genus.

== Behaviour ==
Like many other species of the genus Dolomedes (Greek translation= crafty or wily), the raft spider typically hunts on the surface of the water with its front appendages outstretched and relies on aquatic vibrations to detect prey. Juveniles are thought mainly to hunt in terrestrial vegetation. Their diet consists largely of freshwater invertebrates such as water beetles, pond striders and dragonfly larvae, but they occasionally feed on small vertebrates such as sticklebacks and small frogs. To avoid predation by birds, the raft spider can fully submerge itself in water and has been known to hide underwater for several minutes.

As is the case with some other Dolomedes species, Dolomedes fimbriatus is sexually cannibalistic, meaning that the female will sometimes eat the male before, during or immediately after mating. Males will try to court the female and prevent her from attacking by signalling their presence using vibrations on the female dragline. However, Dolomedes fimbriatus is one of the few species known to attempt to attack nearly all approaching males. This behaviour is regarded as unusual among biologists as it can prevent both the male and the female from copulating successfully.

If successful copulation takes place, the female will carry her fertilised egg sac around with her, before placing the egg sac inside a silken nursery tent that she has made. The female will then guard the nursery until the spiderlings are ready to disperse into the surrounding habitat.

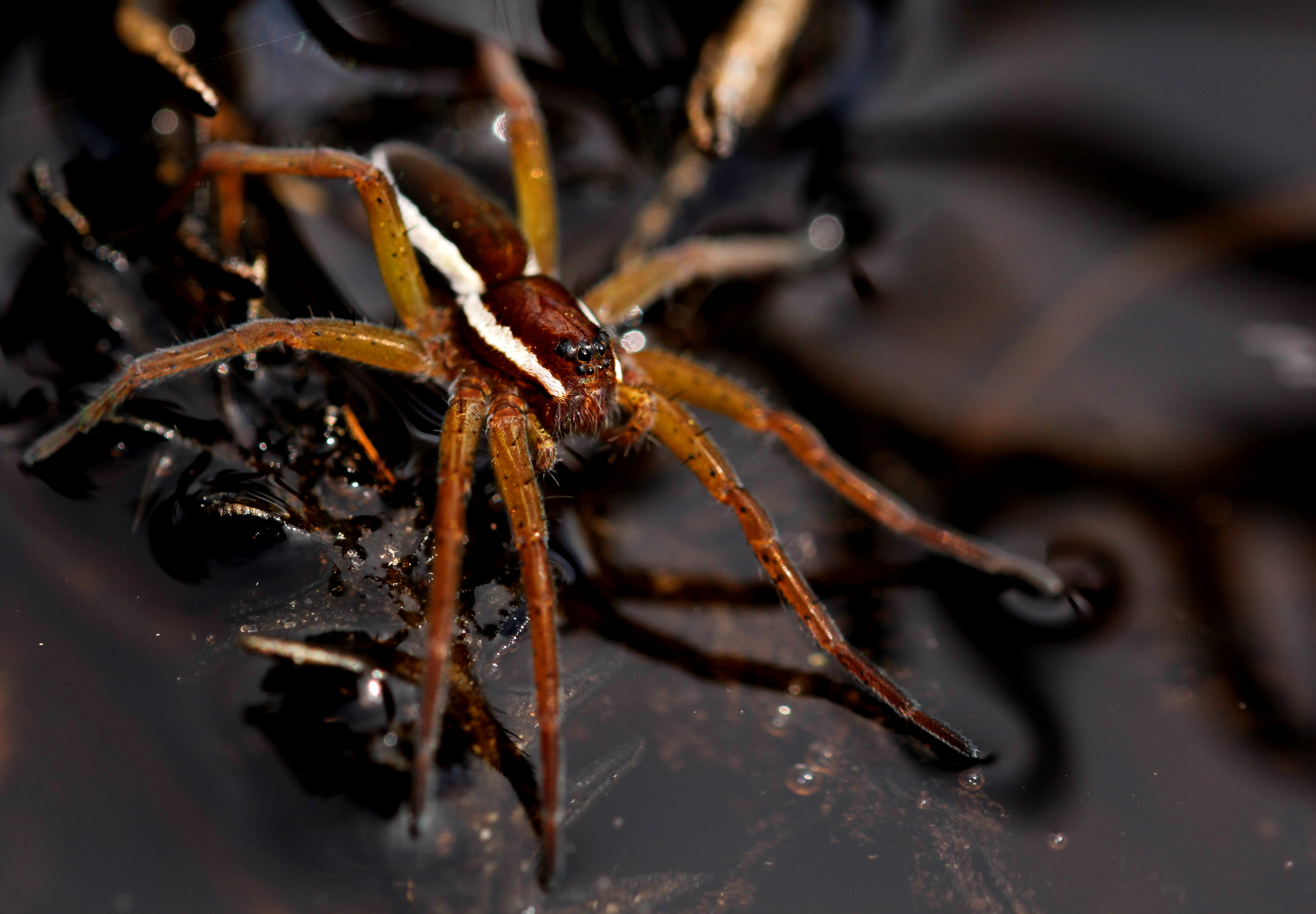
Juvenile raft spider

Dolomedes fimbriatus (video)

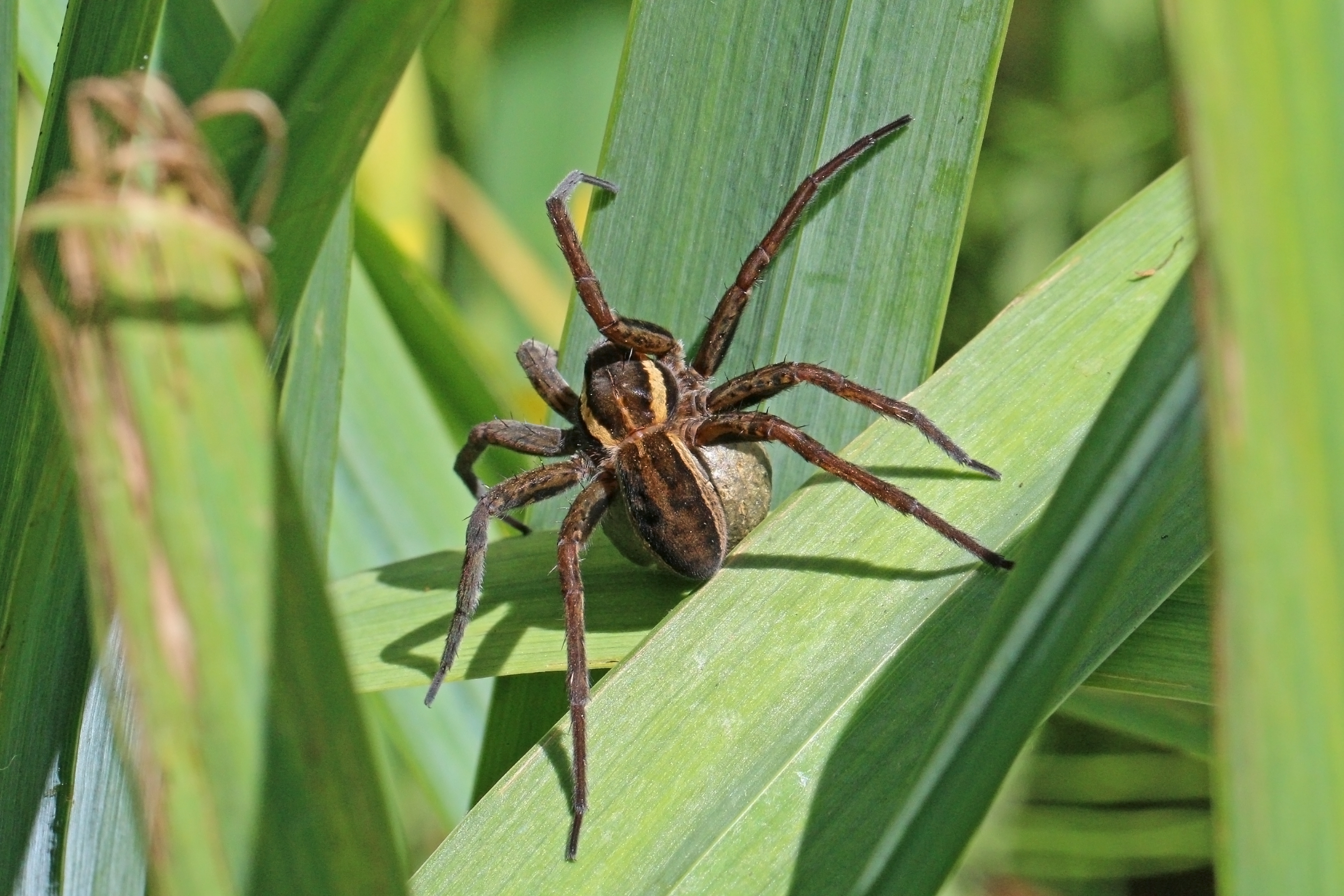
Female raft spider carrying egg sac

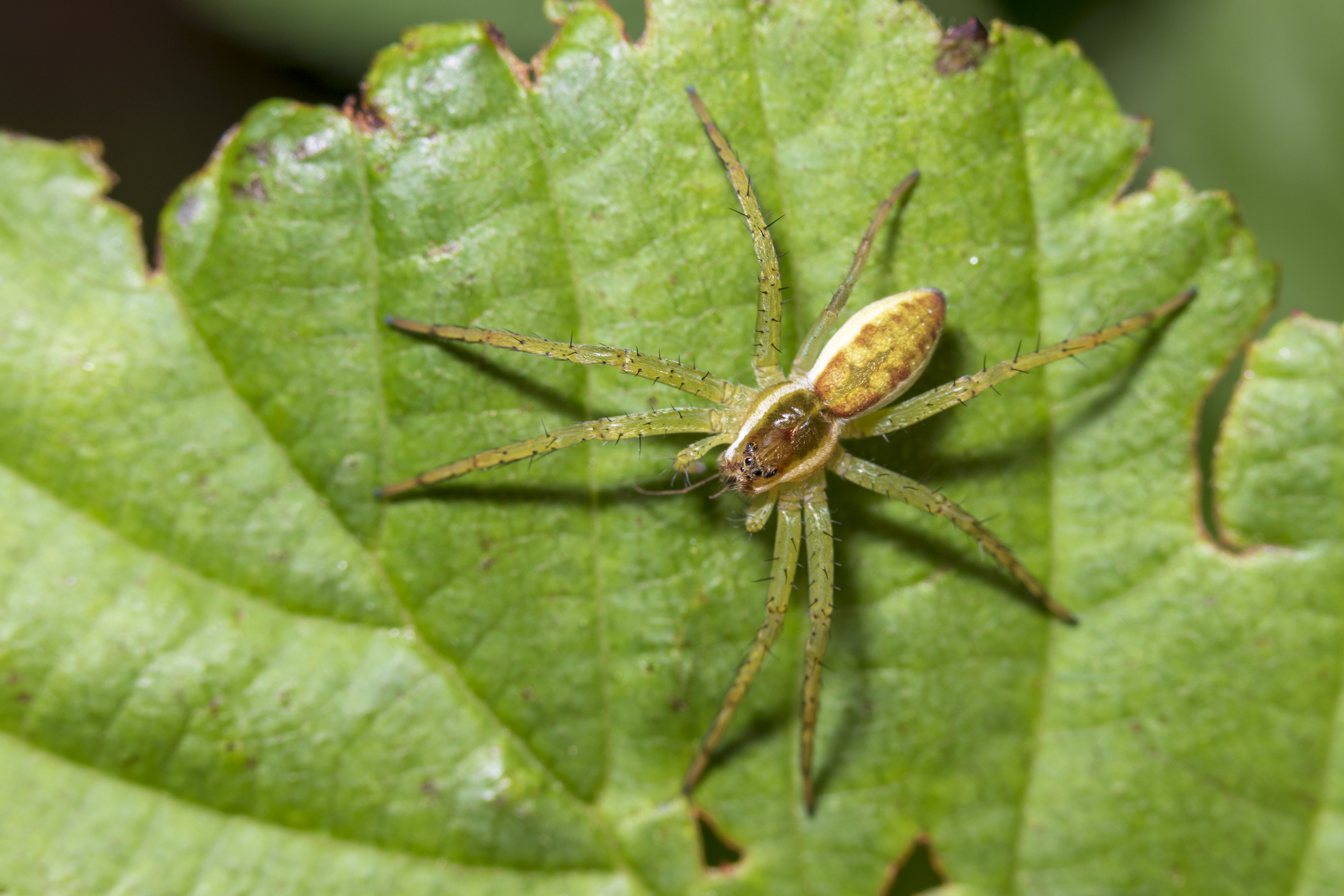
Juvenile Dolomedes fimbriatus
