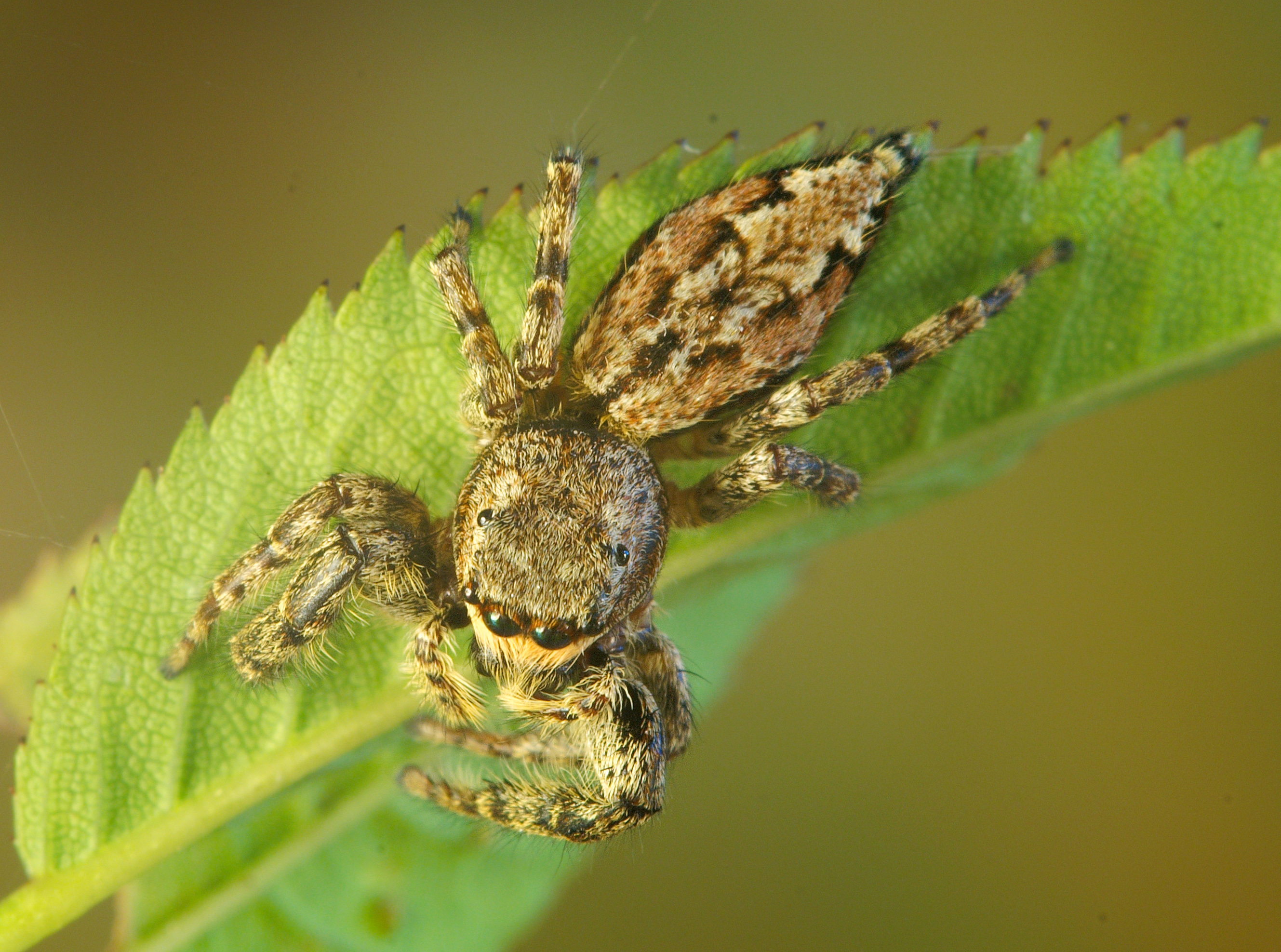

Scientific classification
- Kingdom: Animalia
- Phylum: Arthropoda
- Subphylum: Chelicerata
- Class: Arachnida
- Order: Araneae
- Infraorder: Araneomorphae
- Family: Salticidae
- Genus: Marpissa
- Species: M. muscosa

Binomial name
- Marpissa muscosa (Clerck, 1757)

= Marpissa muscosa =

Species of spider

Marpissa muscosa is a species of jumping spider.

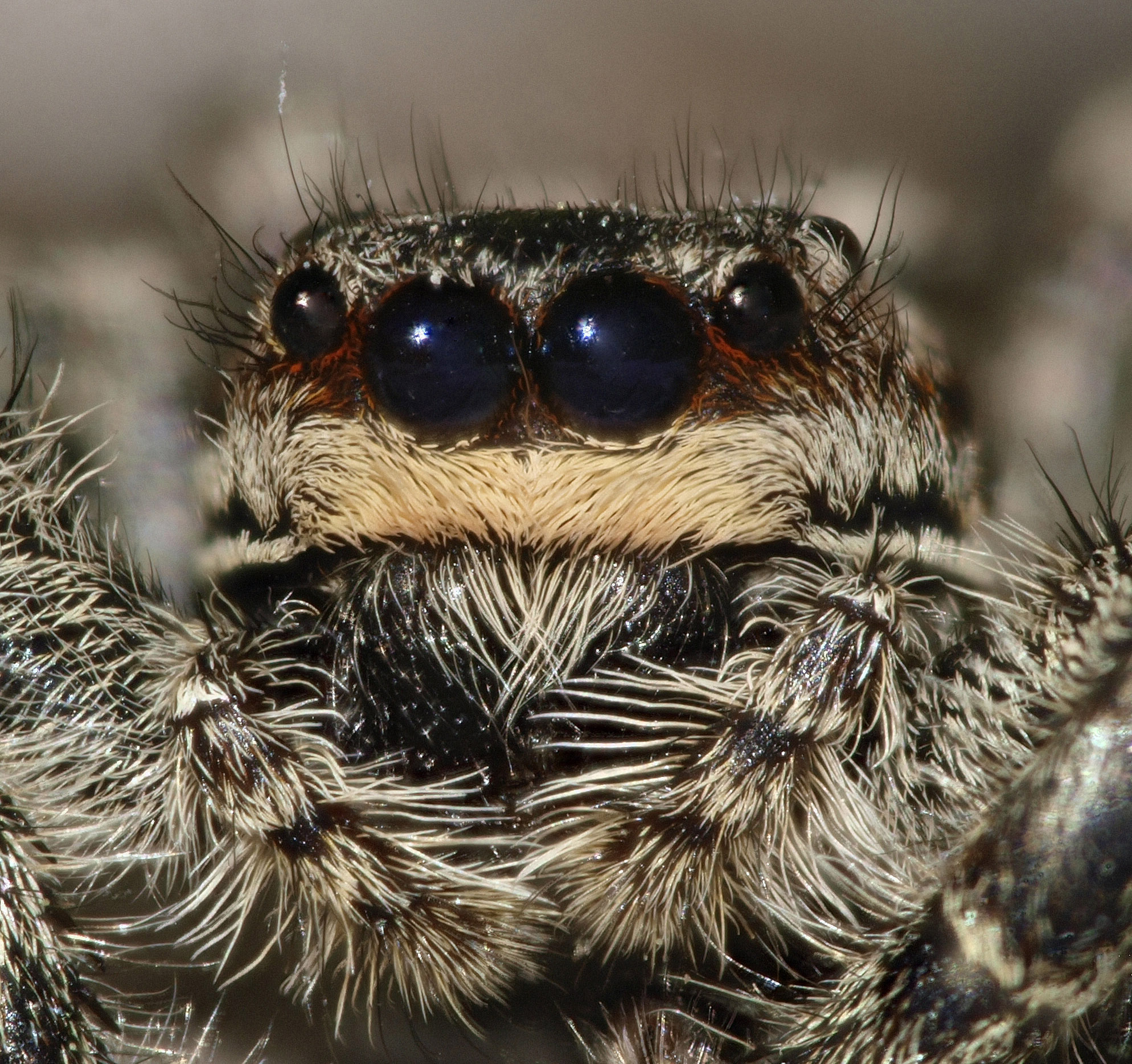
Marpissa muscosa, female

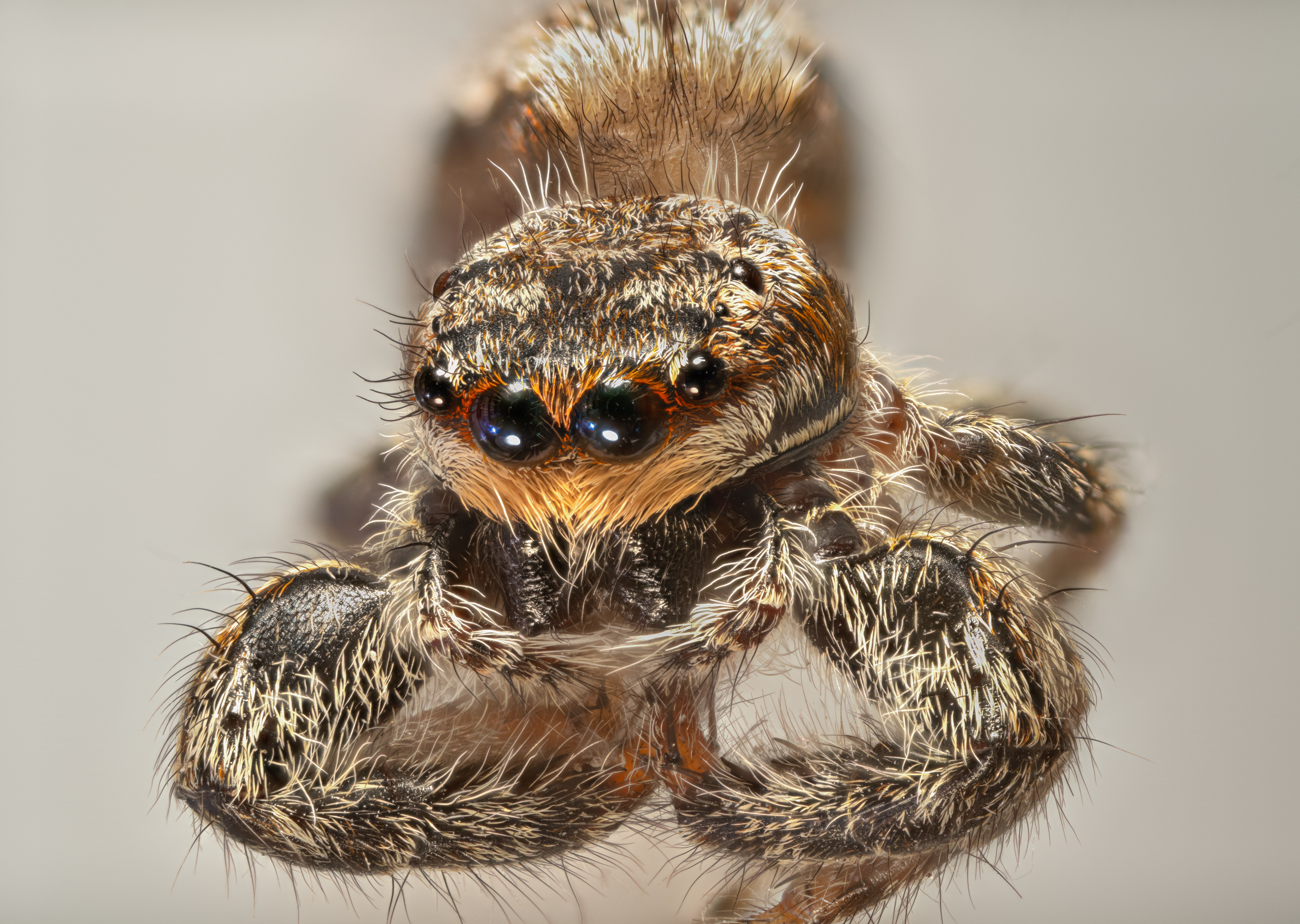
Female

On average, females have body length ranging from 7.5–14mm, whereas males have a body length ranging from 6–8.1mm. Both sexes are coloured grey to brown. The whole spider has a furry appearance and is flattened in shape.

The species builds a kind of nest under the bark of dead trees. Up to 100 of these nests can occur side by side. Like other species of Marpissa spiders, it demonstrates a social hierarchy: weaker animals will acknowledge their inferiority by strutting their front legs and slowly retreating from the scene. Early environmental conditions shape personality types in the developing spiders.

== Distribution ==
Marpissa muscosa lives in the Palaearctic.

Though rare in England, it is found throughout the country, more in the south and east. The species is widespread in northern Europe.

Now in SW Canada

== Habitat ==
These spiders are typically found on spruce and pine trees, under bark, in moor- and heathland, and around buildings.
