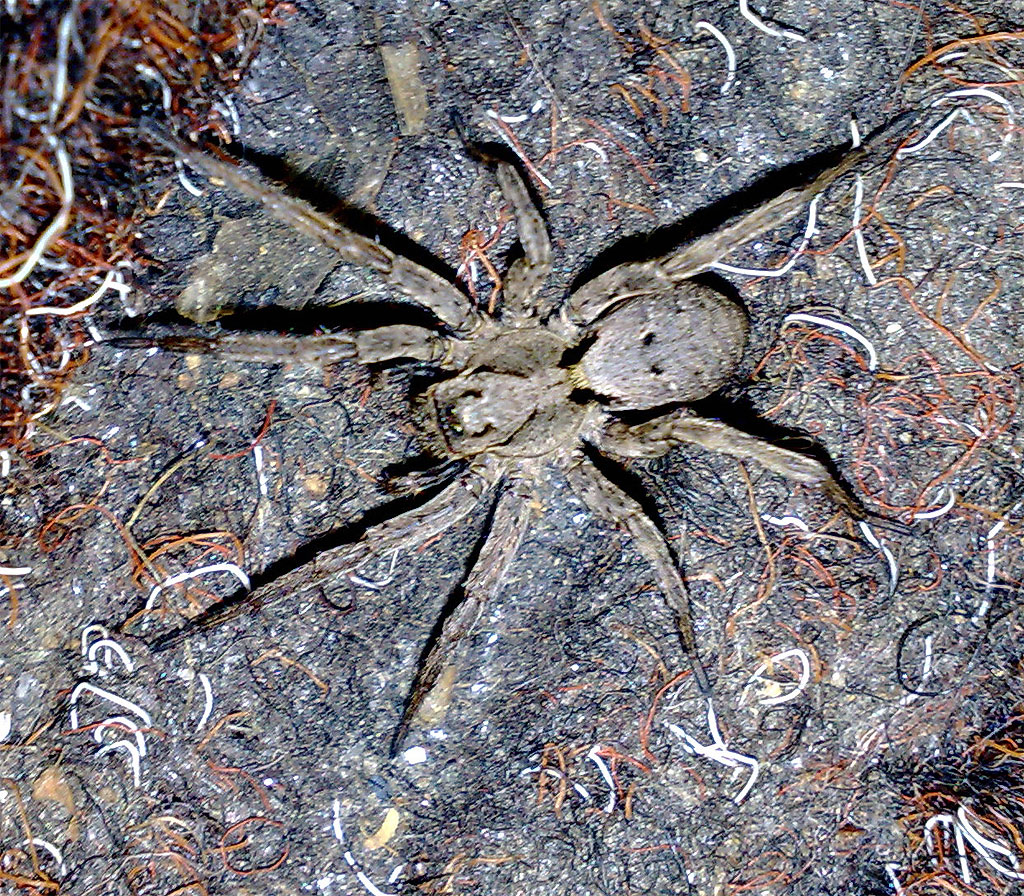

Scientific classification
- Domain: Eukaryota
- Kingdom: Animalia
- Phylum: Arthropoda
- Subphylum: Chelicerata
- Class: Arachnida
- Order: Araneae
- Infraorder: Araneomorphae
- Family: Lycosidae
- Genus: Alopecosa
- Species: A. inquilina

Binomial name
- Alopecosa inquilina (Clerck, 1757)

= Alopecosa inquilina =

Species of spider

Alopecosa inquilina is a species of wolf spider found throughout Europe, Russia and Kazakhstan.

The species was described in 1757 in the book Svenska Spindlar by Carl Alexander Clerck.
