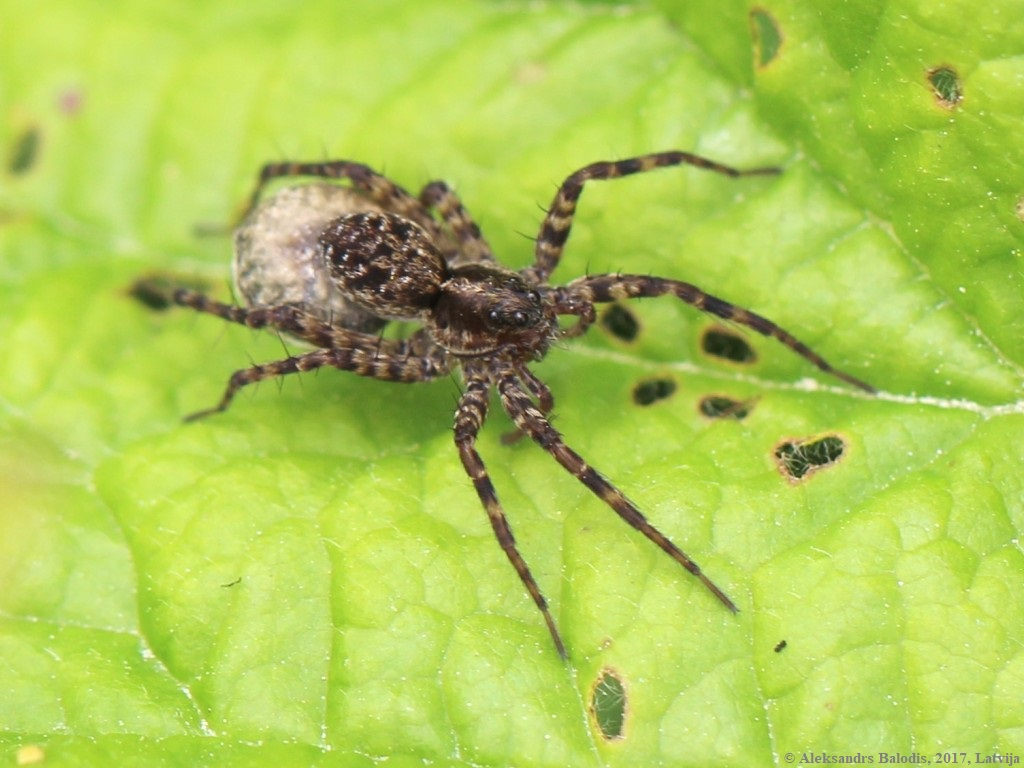
- Female

Scientific classification
- Domain: Eukaryota
- Kingdom: Animalia
- Phylum: Arthropoda
- Subphylum: Chelicerata
- Class: Arachnida
- Order: Araneae
- Infraorder: Araneomorphae
- Family: Lycosidae
- Genus: Pardosa
- Species: P. amentata

Binomial name
- Pardosa amentata (Clerck, 1757)

= Pardosa amentata =

Spotted wolf spider

Species of spider

Pardosa amentata, otherwise known as the wolf spider or spotted wolf spider is a species of spider in the genus Pardosa belonging to the family of wolf spiders, Lycosidae. The species has a widespread distribution in central Europe and northwestern Europe and are commonly found on the British Isles. The species hunts its prey on the ground rather than weaving a web.

It was described in chapter 5 of the book Svenska Spindlar by the Swedish arachnologist and entomologist Carl Alexander Clerck.

== Description ==
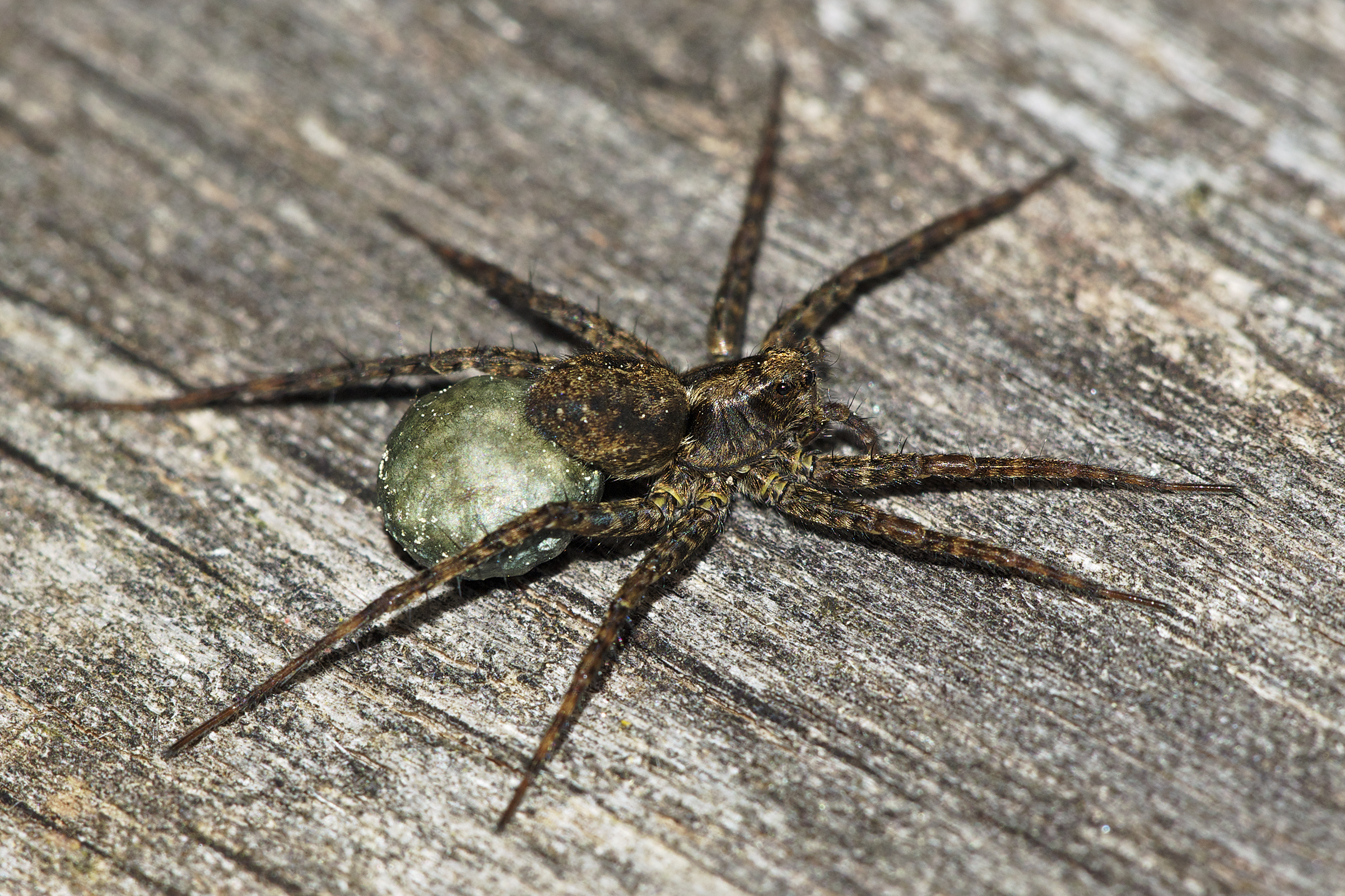
Female carrying egg sac.

Pardosa amentata is a wolf spider between 5 mm and 8 mm in length and has a brownish coloured body with darker brown markings or spots. The females are usually slightly larger than males and carry their eggs in a round sack made of silk beneath the abdomen attached by the silk threads produced from the spinnerets, but they lack the sooty-black hairs on the end of the pedipalps. The spider relies heavily on its eyesight to locate and stalk its prey, and its body is specially adapted for this purpose with its head squared off at the sides with two large and four smaller eyes facing forward, giving excellent frontal vision and two additional eyes situated on top of the head which extend the range of vision sideways and to the rear.

== Behavior ==
P. amentata prey on a crane fly. (At the beginning of the video a Pirata piraticus is involved)

The spider does not weave a web, but is a quick and agile hunter and chases and leaps on any prey that comes into sight, piercing it with its fangs. Their diet consists largely of flies and other small insects. They are often active very early in the spring and between the months March to July. They can often be seen in full daylight, taking advantage of its vision and scurrying around in the open or on low vegetation, hunting for prey and warming themselves in the sunshine on patches of bare soil. During mating, the male stops a few centimetres away from the female and raises itself high on its hind legs and stretches its palps out and waves them to attract the female, moving gradually closer to her. If the female rejects his advances she will lunge forward and the smaller male will retreat and return a few seconds later to start his display again. After hatching from the eggs, the baby spiderlings stay on their mother and are carried by the female on her back until their second moult at which point they are large enough to fend for themselves.

== Habitat ==
The spider occurs in a wide range of open habitats, especially in damp areas. It has been recorded from grasslands, marshes, riversides, fens, saltmarsh, hedge banks, moorland, blanket bog, waste ground and field margins but rarely in heathland. In winter, they can also be found in houses near windows, doors, house plants and in basements to avoid the cold weather. They can also be found in the leaf litter at woodland edges and clearing. In the UK, it is usually the most common species of the genus Pardosa found in gardens.
