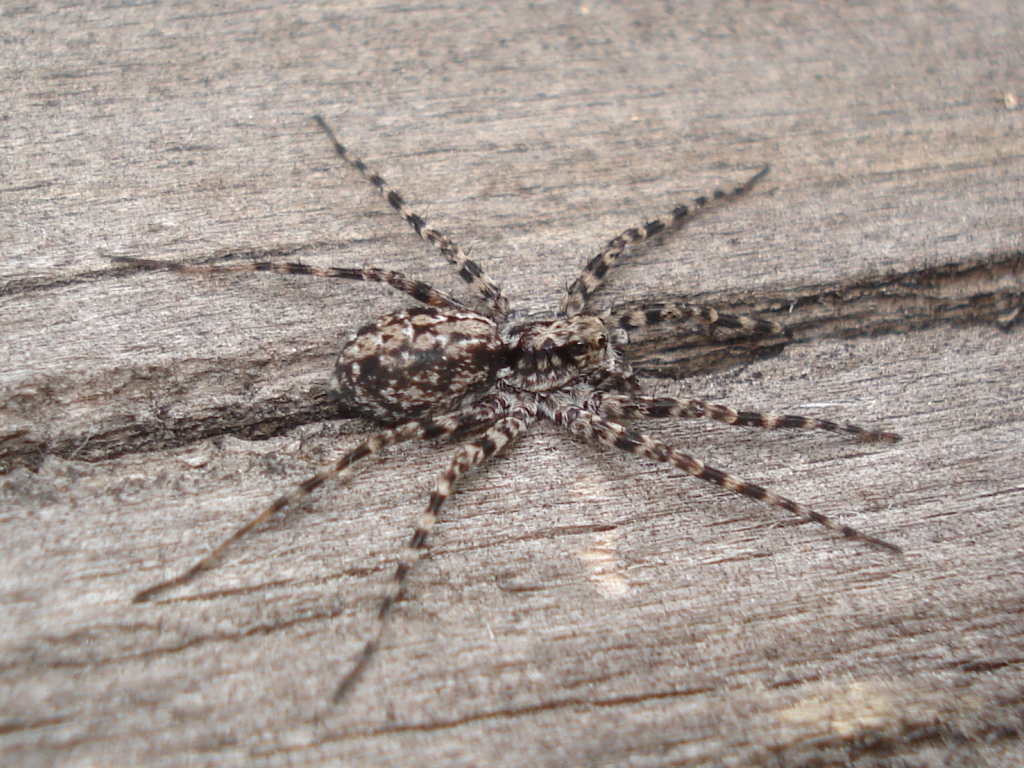

Scientific classification
- Kingdom: Animalia
- Phylum: Arthropoda
- Subphylum: Chelicerata
- Class: Arachnida
- Order: Araneae
- Infraorder: Araneomorphae
- Family: Lycosidae
- Genus: Acantholycosa
- Species: A. lignaria

Binomial name
- Acantholycosa lignaria Clerck, 1757

= Acantholycosa lignaria =

Species of spider

Acantholycosa lignaria is a species of wolf spiders. It is a widespread species of central and northern Europe.

It was described in chapter 5 of the book Svenska Spindlar by the Swedish arachnologist and entomologist Carl Alexander Clerck.
