= Pumpkin spider =

Pumpkin spider may refer to:

- Araneus diadematus, also called the cross spider
- Araneus marmoreus, also called the marbled orb-weaver
