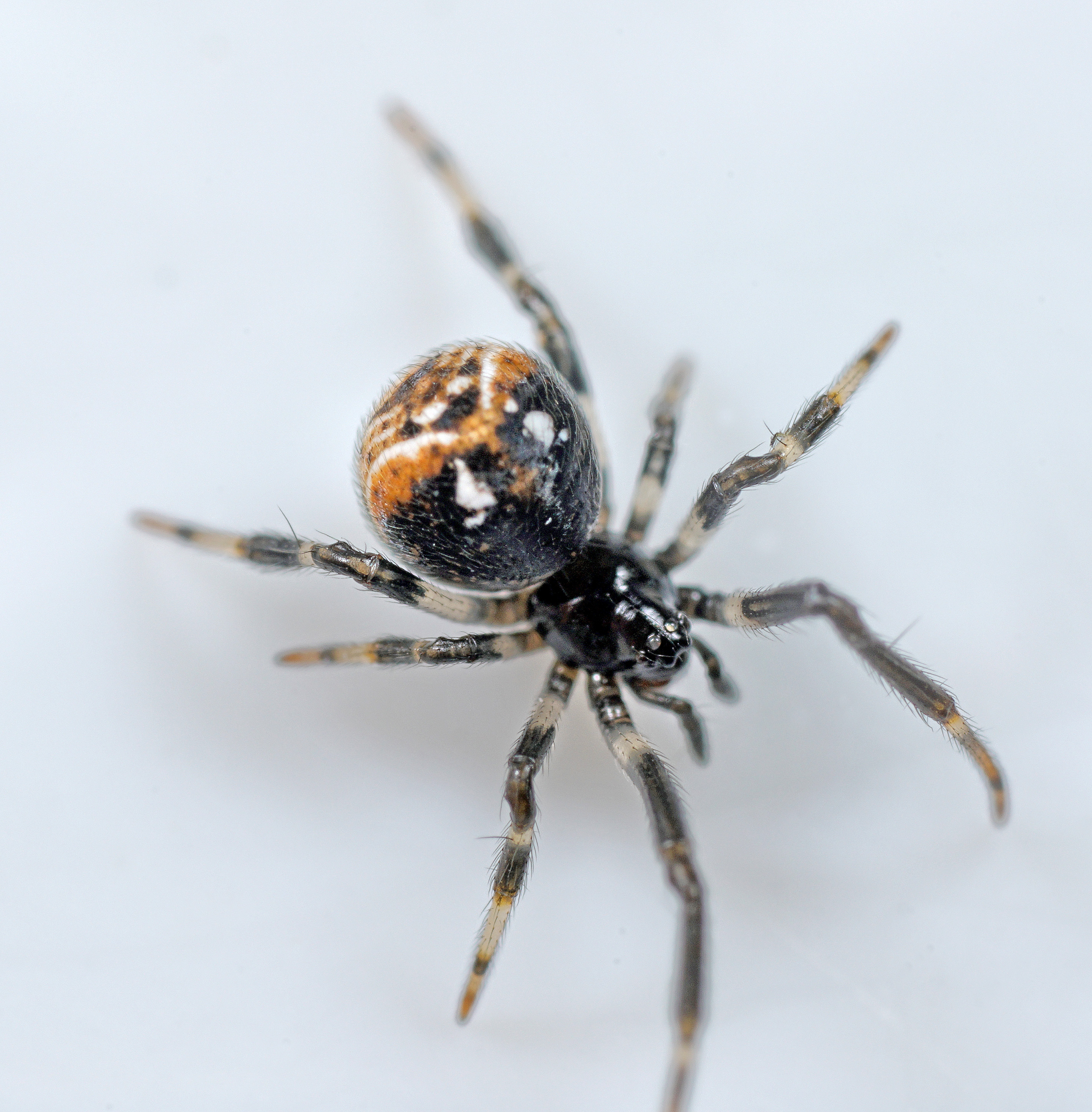
- female from France
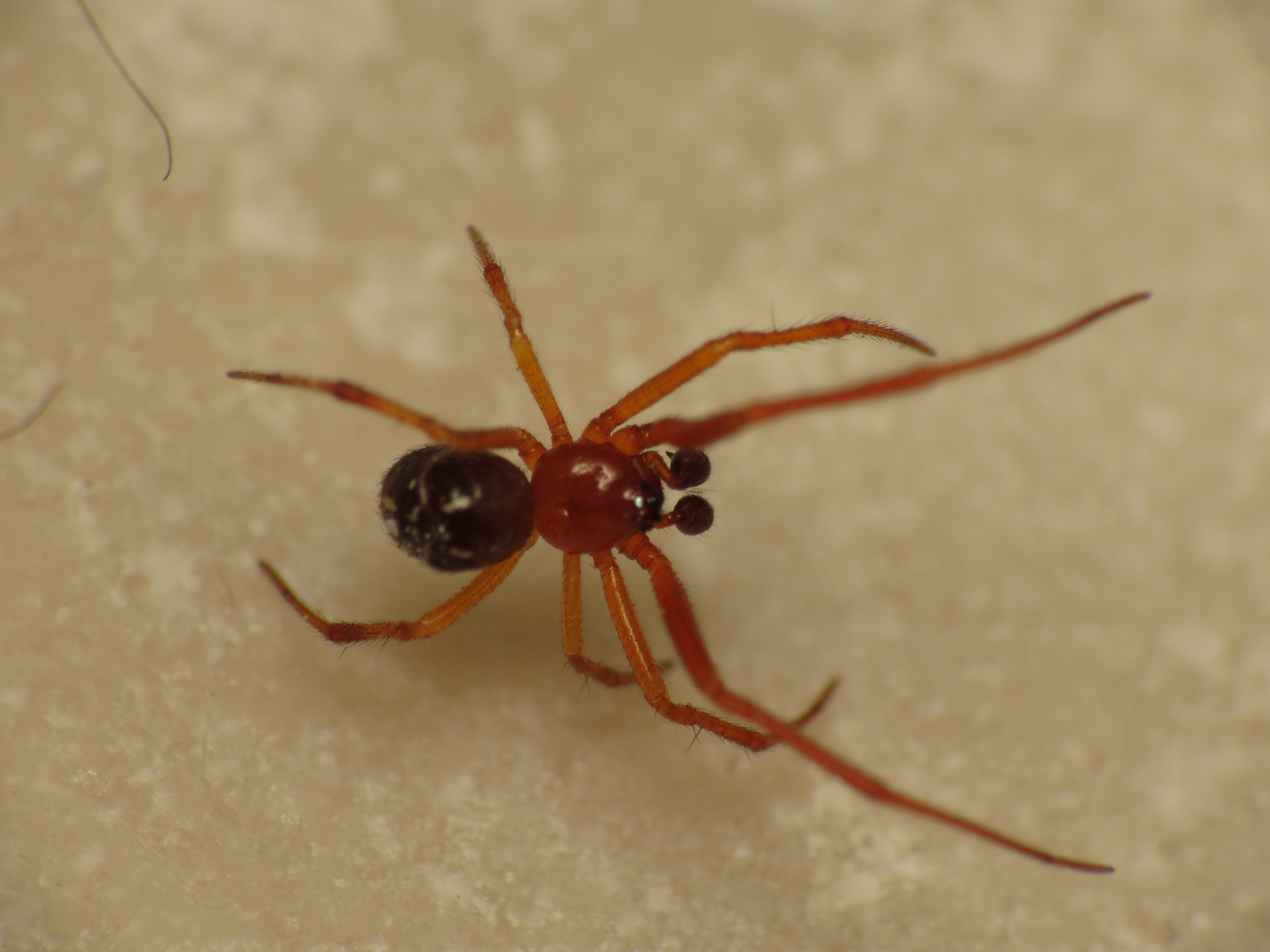
- male from Denmark

Scientific classification
- Kingdom: Animalia
- Phylum: Arthropoda
- Subphylum: Chelicerata
- Class: Arachnida
- Order: Araneae
- Infraorder: Araneomorphae
- Family: Theridiidae
- Genus: Parasteatoda
- Species: P. lunata

Binomial name
- Parasteatoda lunata (Clerck, 1757)

Synonyms
- Araneus lunatus Clerck, 1757; Araneus formosus Clerck, 1757; Aranea lunata Olivier, 1789; Aranea formosa Olivier, 1789; Aranea sisiphia Walckenaer, 1802; Aranea urticae Walckenaer, 1802; Theridion sisiphum Walckenaer, 1805; Theridion sisyphum Hahn, 1836; Theridion urticae Walckenaer, 1841; Theridium lunatum C. L. Koch, 1841; Theridion lunatum C. L. Koch, 1845; Theridion formosum Westring, 1851; Steatoda lunata Thorell, 1856; Steatoda formosa Karsch, 1873; Parasteatoda formosum Archer, 1950; Theridium urticae Bonnet, 1959; Achaearanea lunata Miller, 1971

= Parasteatoda lunata =

Species of spider

Parasteatoda lunata is a species of cobweb spider in the family Theridiidae. Originally described by Carl Alexander Clerck in 1757 as Araneus lunatus, it has undergone numerous taxonomic revisions and was transferred to the genus Parasteatoda in 2008.

== Distribution ==
P. lunata has a Palearctic distribution, occurring across Europe, Turkey, Israel, the Caucasus, and throughout Russia from the European regions to the Far East, extending into Iran. The species has been introduced to South Africa.

== Habitat ==
The species inhabits deciduous forests, screes, and open pine forests, typically found among piles of stones.

Parasteatoda lunata has been sampled from bark. The retreat is a long narrow silk tube.

== Description ==
=== Female ===
Females are notably larger than males, with a total length of 4.4 ± 0.7 mm (range 3.5–5.8 mm) and a carapace length of 1.62 ± 0.13 mm (range 1.33–1.88 mm) and width of 1.34 ± 0.13 mm (range 1.10–1.63 mm).

The carapace varies in color from light reddish brown to black. The chelicerae are small, often brownish and glossy, with tooth and denticle arrangement similar to males. The sternum is brown to black, and the legs are yellowish brown with dark brown coloration near the articulations. The leg formula is 1423, and the palpal tarsi bear claws.

The abdomen shows highly variable coloration patterns, ranging from black to very light colors, often featuring white streaks arching down the sides and bright white markings. The venter is dark with a characteristic white spot behind the epigastric furrow, and there are light patches in front of the spinnerets.

The epigyne is broad with an atrium separated by a distinct septum. The copulatory openings are wide, and the copulatory ducts are strongly sclerotized with rounded receptacles.

=== Male ===
As with related species, males are smaller than females, with a total length of 2.7–3.0 mm and a carapace length of 1.22–1.33 mm and width of 1.2–1.15 mm. The carapace ranges from light brown to black with the cephalic part slightly raised. The chelicerae are small with one promarginal tooth and some thin bristles, plus one retromarginal denticle. The labium is wider than long and not rebordered, with a seam between the labium and sternum. The sternum is triangular with a dark margin, and its tip is truncate, not projecting between the fourth coxae.

The legs are light brownish with darker segments apically, except the tarsi. The abdomen is higher than long when viewed from the side, with blackish parts, white lines and dots creating patterns on a dark brown background with a reddish tint.

The pedipalp has a twisted embolus in close contact with the tegular apophysis. The conductor is large with several small tubercles on its external surface, extending beyond the apex of the alveolus.

== Biology ==
Adult males are active from mid-May to mid-July, while adult females have a longer activity period from mid-May to the end of September. In Denmark, the species exhibits a biennial life cycle with five instars, overwintering as first and fourth instars (subadults) in the second winter. The species hibernates very early in autumn and has an extended breeding period of at least three months.

Females produce dull brownish cocoons approximately 5 mm in diameter containing about 55 yellow eggs. Hatching occurs after 17–20 days, and notably, the young are not fed by the female.

== Taxonomy ==
The species has a complex taxonomic history, having been placed in multiple genera including Araneus, Aranea, Theridion, Theridium, Steatoda, and Achaearanea before its current placement in Parasteatoda. The transfer to Parasteatoda was made by Yoshida in 2008 based on morphological analyses of theridiid relationships.
