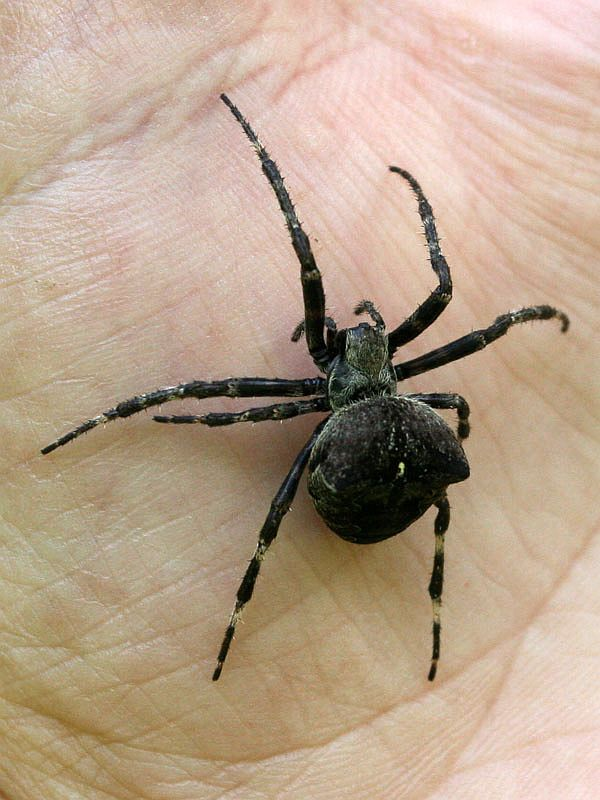

Scientific classification
- Domain: Eukaryota
- Kingdom: Animalia
- Phylum: Arthropoda
- Subphylum: Chelicerata
- Class: Arachnida
- Order: Araneae
- Infraorder: Araneomorphae
- Family: Araneidae
- Genus: Araneus
- Species: A. angulatus

Binomial name
- Araneus angulatus Clerck, 1757

= Araneus angulatus =

Species of spider

Araneus angulatus is a species of orb-weaving spiders found in the Palearctic realm. It resembles the European garden spider, Araneus diadematus, but has distinctive tubercles on its abdomen. The species was first described in Aranei Svecici in 1757, where it was the first species described, making Araneus angulatus the first scientific name of an animal that is still in use.

== Description ==
Araneus angulatus closely resembles the more frequently encountered European garden spider, Araneus diadematus, but can be distinguished by the presence of angular tubercles on the abdomen.

== Distribution ==
Araneus angulatus is found across a wide geographical range in the Palearctic realm. It is widespread in Europe, although rarer in Northern Europe. A. angulatus is rare in the United Kingdom, where it is restricted to areas near the South coast of England.

== Subspecies ==
Six subspecies are currently recognized:

- Araneus angulatus afolius (Franganillo, 1909) — Portugal
- Araneus angulatus atricolor Simon, 1929 — France
- Araneus angulatus levifolius (Franganillo, 1909) — Portugal
- Araneus angulatus niger (Franganillo, 1918) — Spain
- Araneus angulatus nitidifolius (Franganillo, 1909) — Portugal
- Araneus angulatus personatus Simon, 1929

Much of the previous subspecies are now part of Araneus pallidus.

== Ecology ==
A. angulatus constructs a large orb web, suspended from bushes and trees, often with support lines leading to the ground. Unlike A. diadematus, the web of A. angulatus has no retreat, so the spider must sit in the centre of the web while it waits for prey. It detects prey items by vibrations they cause in the web, but has also been observed during a country fair, and reported to be "indifferent to crowds, music and fireworks".

== Taxonomic history ==
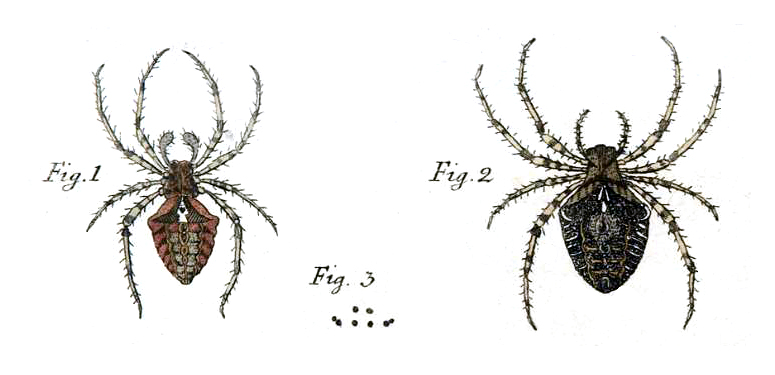
The illustration accompanying Clerck's description of Araneus angulatus in Aranei Svecici / Svenska Spindlar, showing a male and a female specimen

Araneus angulatus was the first of the 66 species described in Carl Alexander Clerck's 1757 work Aranei Svecici / Svenska Spindlar. Under the International Code of Zoological Nomenclature Svenska Spindlar has precedence over the 10th edition of Carl Linnaeus' Systema Naturae from 1758, and is therefore the first work to contain scientific names of animals that are still in use.
