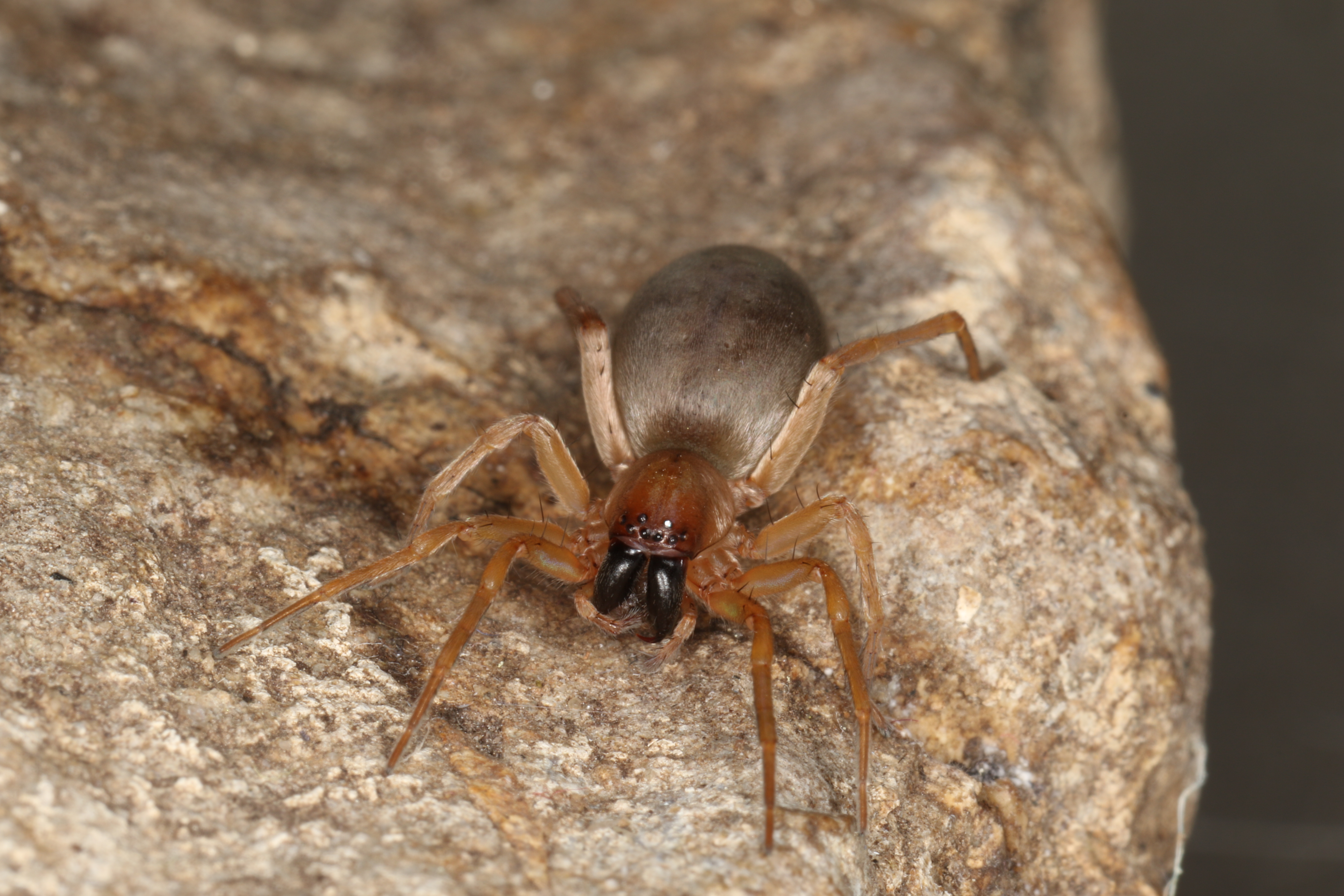

Scientific classification
- Kingdom: Animalia
- Phylum: Arthropoda
- Subphylum: Chelicerata
- Class: Arachnida
- Order: Araneae
- Infraorder: Araneomorphae
- Family: Clubionidae
- Genus: Clubiona
- Species: C. pallidula

Binomial name
- Clubiona pallidula (Clerck, 1757)

= Clubiona pallidula =

Species of spider

Clubiona pallidula is a species of sac spider in the family Clubionidae. It is found in Europe, Caucasus, a range from Russia to Central Asia, and has been introduced into North America.

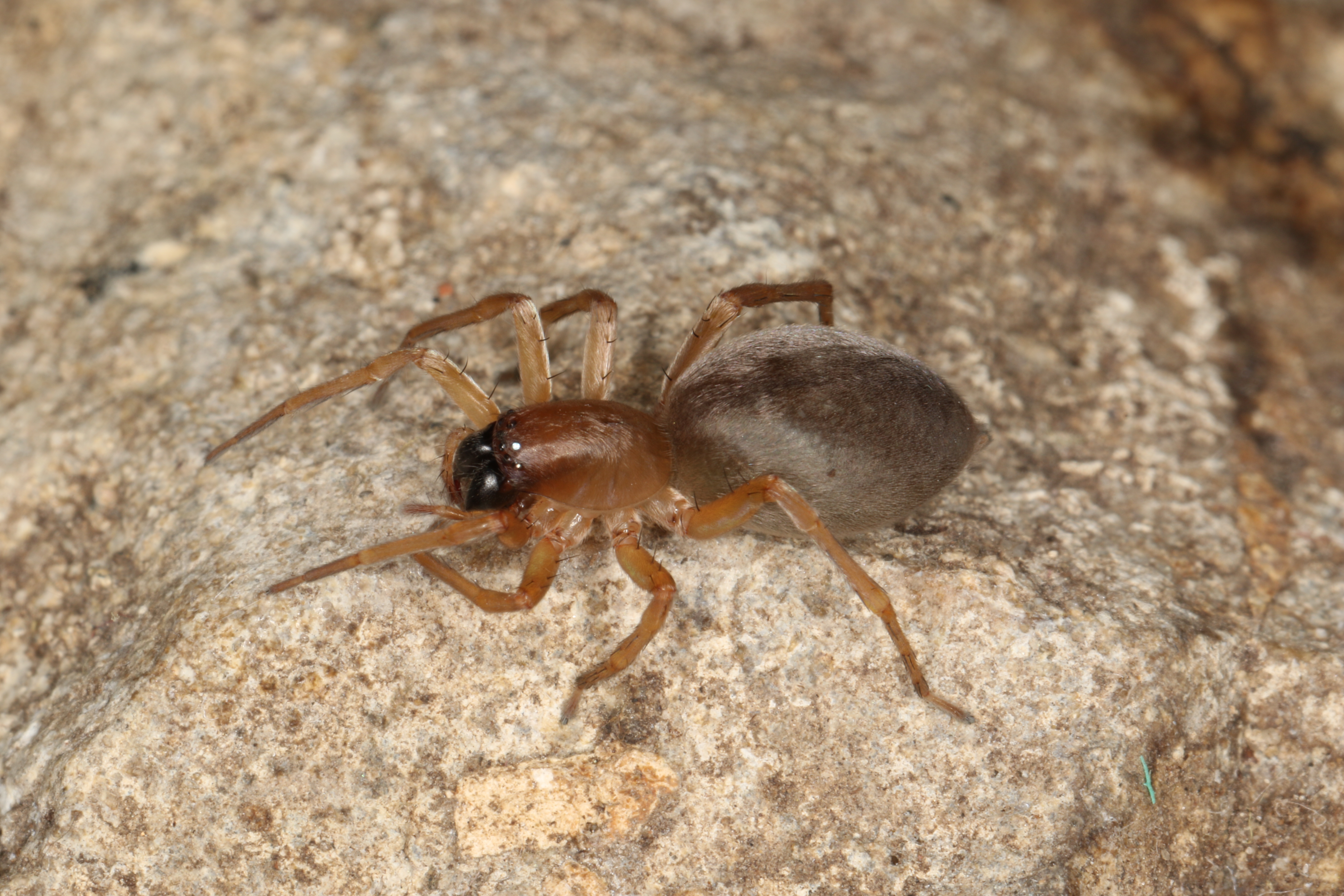

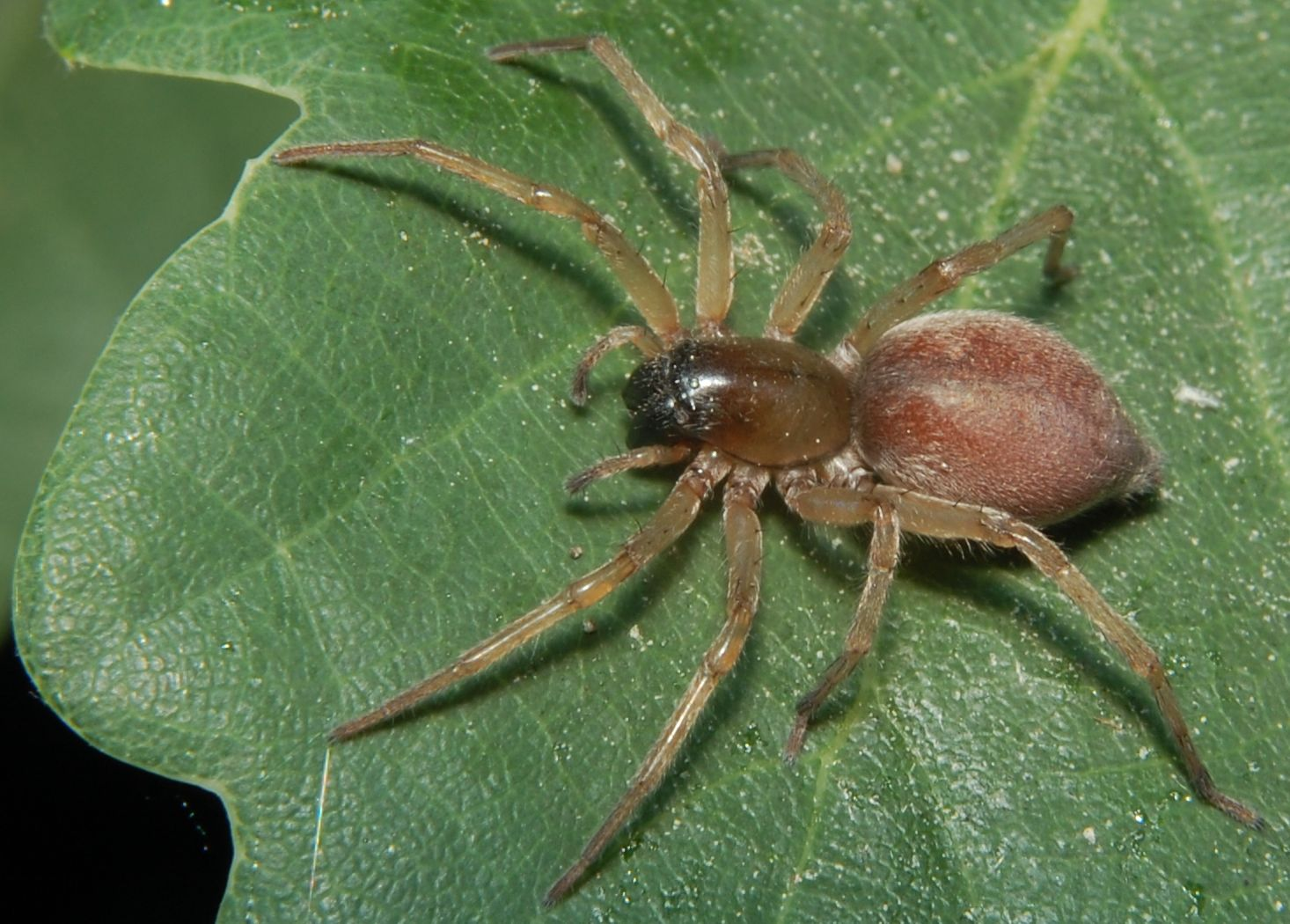
