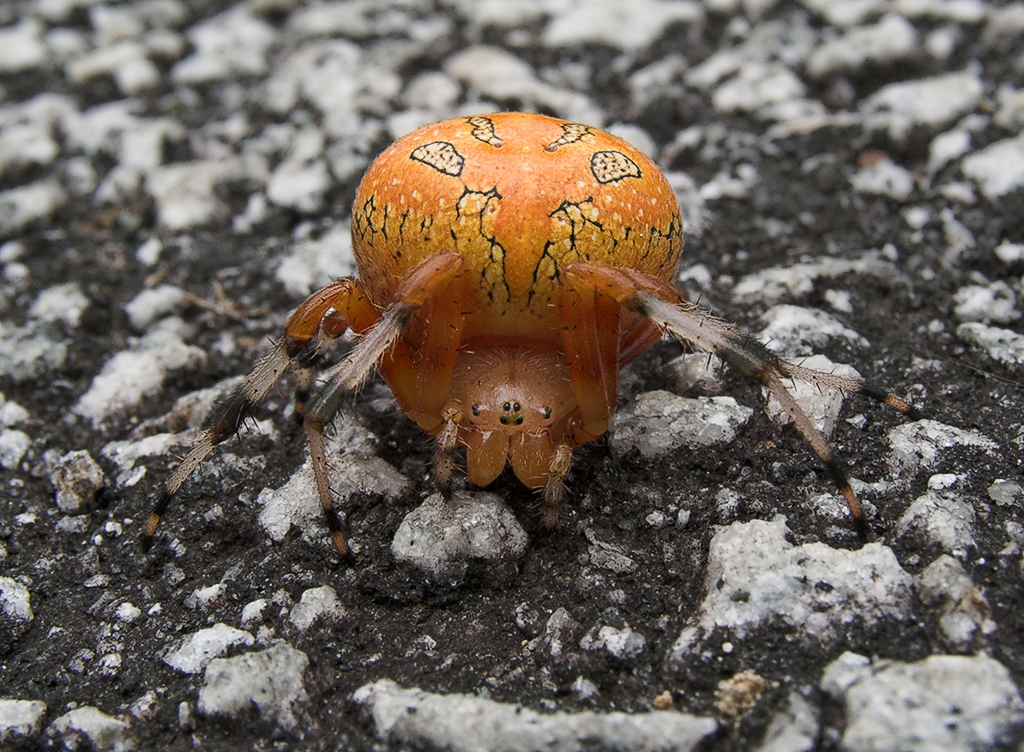
- Female Araneus marmoreus var. marmoreus
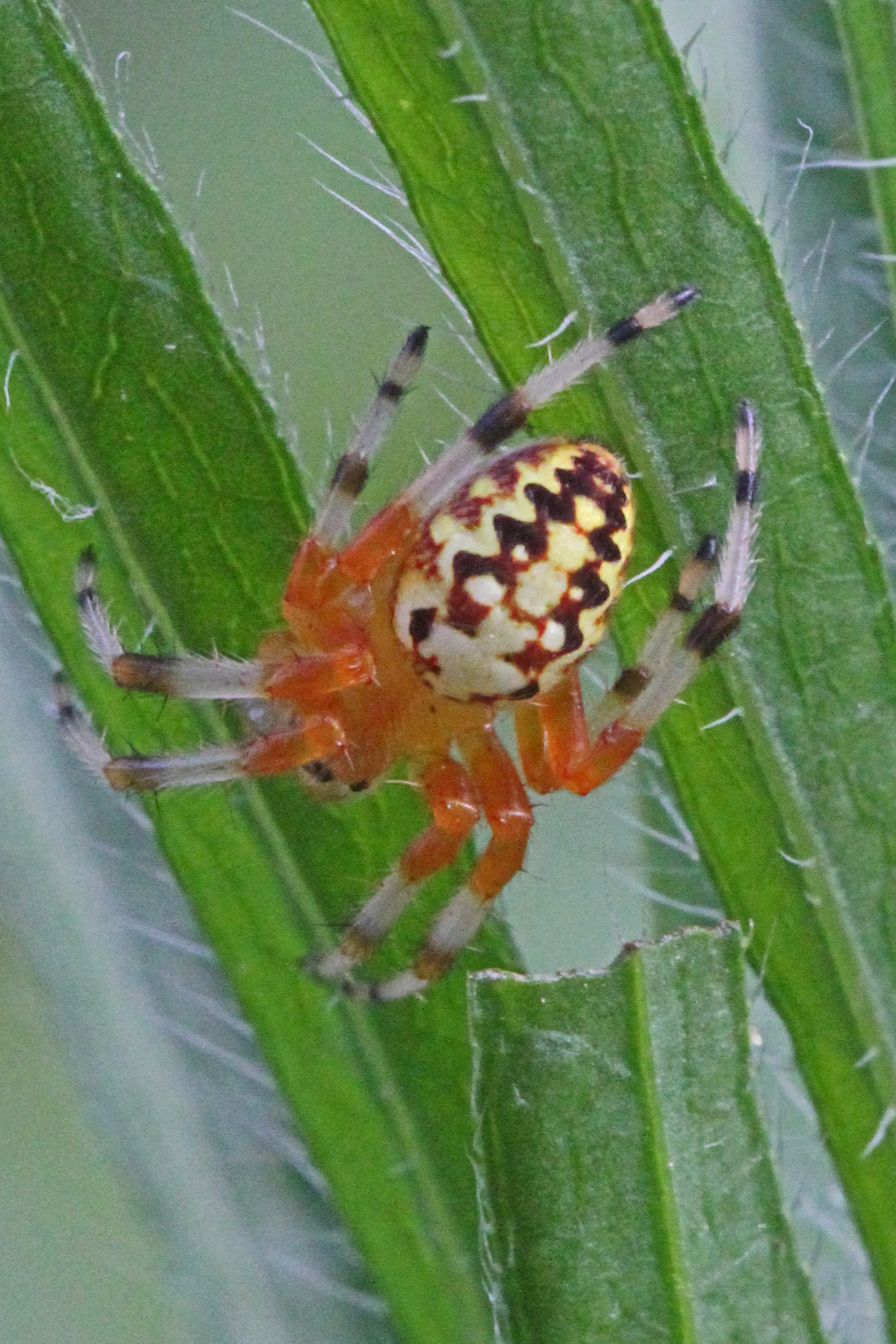
- Male Araneus marmoreus var. marmoreus

Conservation status
- Secure (NatureServe)

Scientific classification
- Kingdom: Animalia
- Phylum: Arthropoda
- Subphylum: Chelicerata
- Class: Arachnida
- Order: Araneae
- Infraorder: Araneomorphae
- Family: Araneidae
- Genus: Araneus
- Species: A. marmoreus

Binomial name
- Araneus marmoreus Clerck, 1757
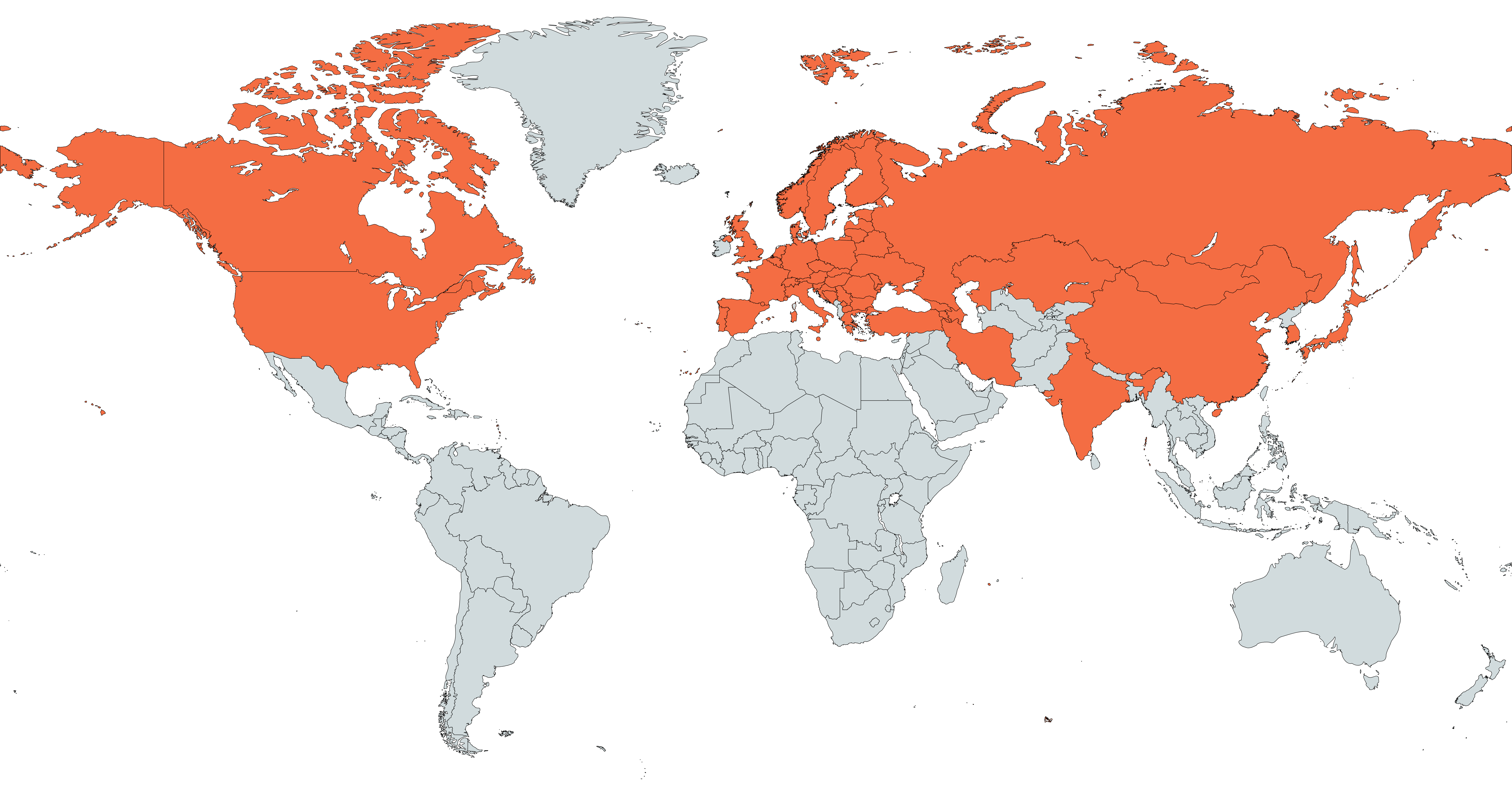

Synonyms
- Araneus marmoreus Clerck, 1757; Araneus pyramidatus Clerck, 1757; Aranea raji Scopoli, 1763; Aranea marmorea (Clerck, 1757); Aranea betulae Sulzer, 1776; Aranea aurantio-maculata De Geer, 1778; Aranea aurantia Olivier, 1789; Aranea pyramidata (Clerck, 1757); Aranea reticulata Roemer, 1789; Aranea scalaris Panzer, 1793; Aranea regalis Panzer, 1797; Aranea melittagria Walckenaer, 1802; Epeira melittagria (Walckenaer, 1802); Epeira scalaris (Panzer, 1793); Dysdera lutea Risso, 1826; Epeira marmorea (Clerck, 1757); Epeira pyramidata (Clerck, 1757); Epeira jenisoni C.L. Koch, 1835; Epeira bohemica C.L. Koch, 1838; Epeira graduata Walckenaer, 1841; Epeira conspicellata Walckenaer, 1841; Epeira insularis Hentz, 1847; Epeira obesa Hentz, 1847; Epeira flava Giebel, 1867; Epeira annulipes Giebel, 1869; Aranea gigas Comstock, 1910; Aranea tusigia Chamberlin, 1919; Araneus gigas (Comstock, 1910); Epeira raji (Scopoli, 1763)

= Araneus marmoreus =

Species of spider

Araneus marmoreus, commonly called the marbled orbweaver, is a species of spider belonging to the family Araneidae. It is sometimes also called the pumpkin spider from the resemblance of the female's inflated abdomen to an orange pumpkin. It has a Holarctic distribution.

== Taxonomy ==
Araneus marmoreus was first described by Carl Alexander Clerck in 1757. In the same work, he also described Araneus pyramidatus, now regarded as a synonym of A. marmoreus.

== Description ==
Adult female marbled orbweavers have a body length of up to 14 mm or more, with a very large oval, sub-spherical abdomen. Adult males are smaller, with a body length of up to 7 mm. Two main color forms are found. A. marmoreus var. marmoreus has an orange abdomen with brown to black marbling. It usually has a distinct folium with dark edging. A. marmoreus var. pyramidatus has a much paler abdomen, with a single dark, often reddish-brown, mark at the rear However, the species can have a wide range of colorations and folium patterns. Var. pyramidatus is more common in Europe, while var pyramidatus is uncommon in North America. The cephalothorax is commonly yellow to burnt-orange with a central dark line and dark lines down either side. The femurs are often red in color with black and white banding beginning on the tibia, metatarsus, and tarsus. The legs may instead have a light brown banded pattern. The venter has a black band enclosed by white brackets.

Egg cocoons, which contain several hundred eggs, are generally deposited in October and are constructed of white silk formed in a flattened sphere. Immature spiders emerge from the cocoons in spring. Adults are seen from midsummer until the first hard freeze of fall.

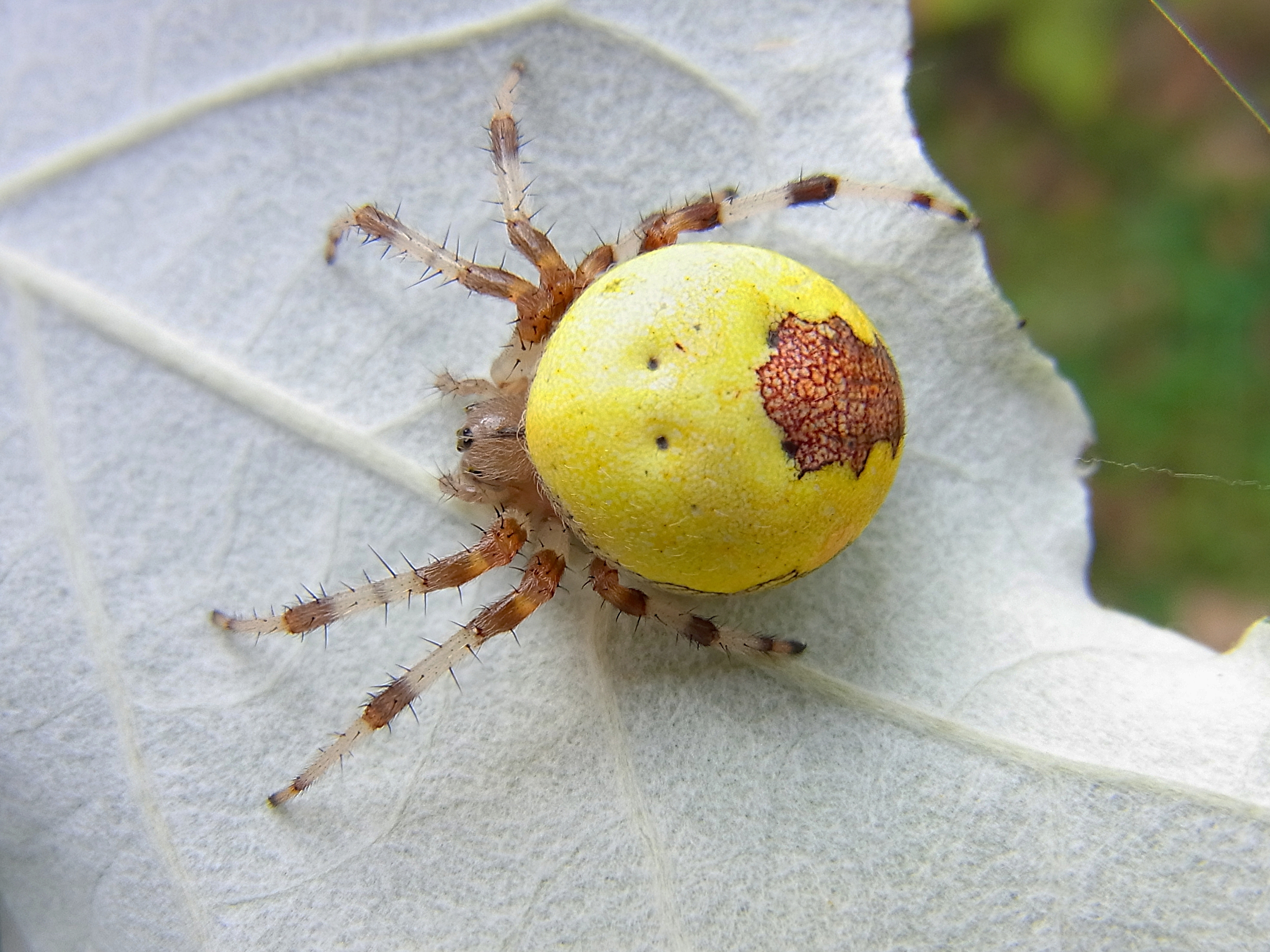
Female of var. pyramidatus

=== Webs ===
The webs are found in trees, shrubs and tall weeds, and grasses in moist, wooded settings and can frequently be found along the banks of streams. The webs are oriented vertically and have a "signal" thread attached to the center that notifies the spider when prey has been captured. Unlike Argiope garden spiders, Araneus marmoreus hides in a silken retreat to the side of the web (at the end of the signal thread). The retreat can be made from leaves folded over and held together with silk, silk only, or under leaves and other debris.

== Distribution ==
Araneus marmoreus has a Holarctic distribution, being found from North America through Europe to Japan. In North America, it is found throughout all of Canada to Alaska, the northern Rockies, from North Dakota to Texas, and then east to the Atlantic.
