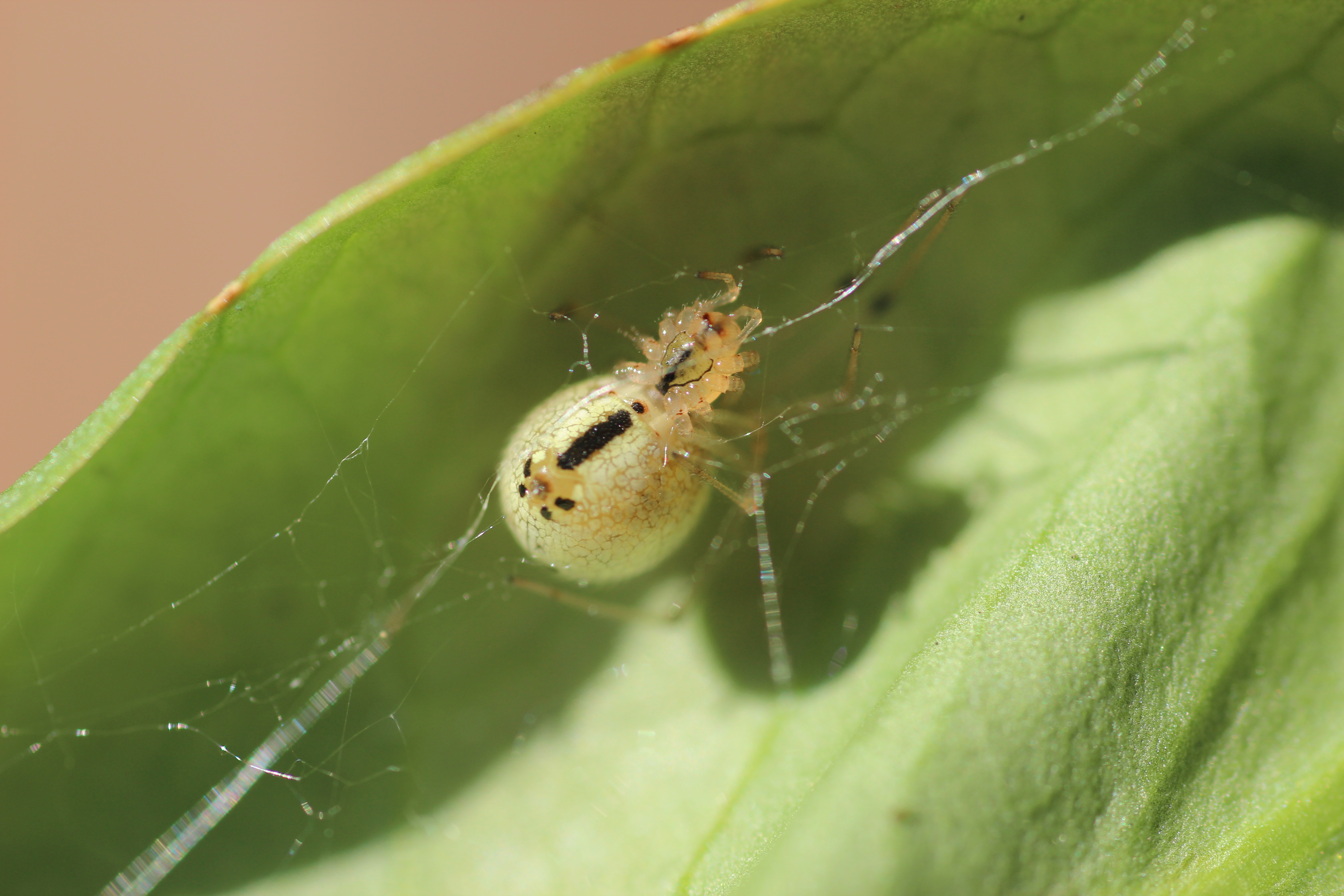

Scientific classification
- Domain: Eukaryota
- Kingdom: Animalia
- Phylum: Arthropoda
- Subphylum: Chelicerata
- Class: Arachnida
- Order: Araneae
- Infraorder: Araneomorphae
- Family: Theridiidae
- Genus: Enoplognatha
- Species: E. latimana

Binomial name
- Enoplognatha latimana Hippa & Oksala, 1982

= Enoplognatha latimana =

Species of spider

Enoplognatha latimana is a species of cobweb spider in the family Theridiidae. It is found in Canada, Europe, North Africa, Turkey, Caucasus, and Central Asia.
