= Carl Alexander Clerck =

Swedish entomologist and arachnologist

Carl Alexander Clerck (1709 – 22 July 1765) was a Swedish entomologist and arachnologist.

Clerck came from a family in the petty nobility and entered the University of Uppsala in 1726. Little is known of his studies; although a contemporary of Carl Linnaeus, it is unknown whether he had any contact with him during his time in Uppsala. His limited means forced him to leave university early and enter into government service, later ending up working in the administration of the City of Stockholm.

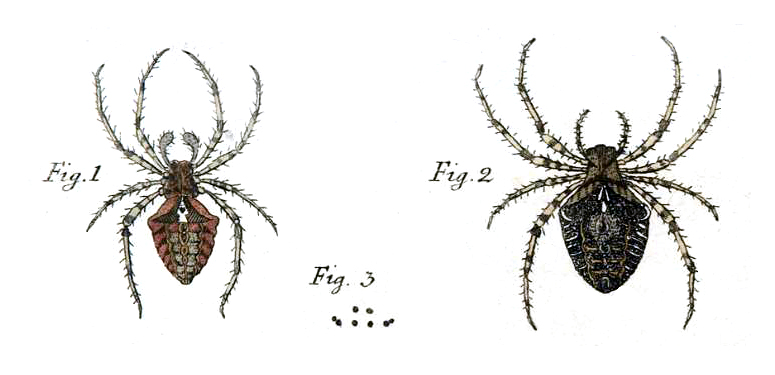
Original figure of male and female Araneus angulatus on Plate 1 in Clerck's Svenska Spindlar

His interest in natural history appears to have come at a more mature age, influenced by a lecture of Linnaeus he attended in Stockholm in 1739. In the following years he collected and categorized many spiders, published together with more general observations on the morphology and behaviour of spiders, in his Svenska Spindlar ("Swedish spiders", 1757, also known by its Latin subtitle, Aranei Suecici). He also started the publication of Icones insectorum rariorum, a series of detailed but uncommented plates illustrating numerous species of butterflies, left unfinished after the third fascicle (1766) because of Clerck's death.

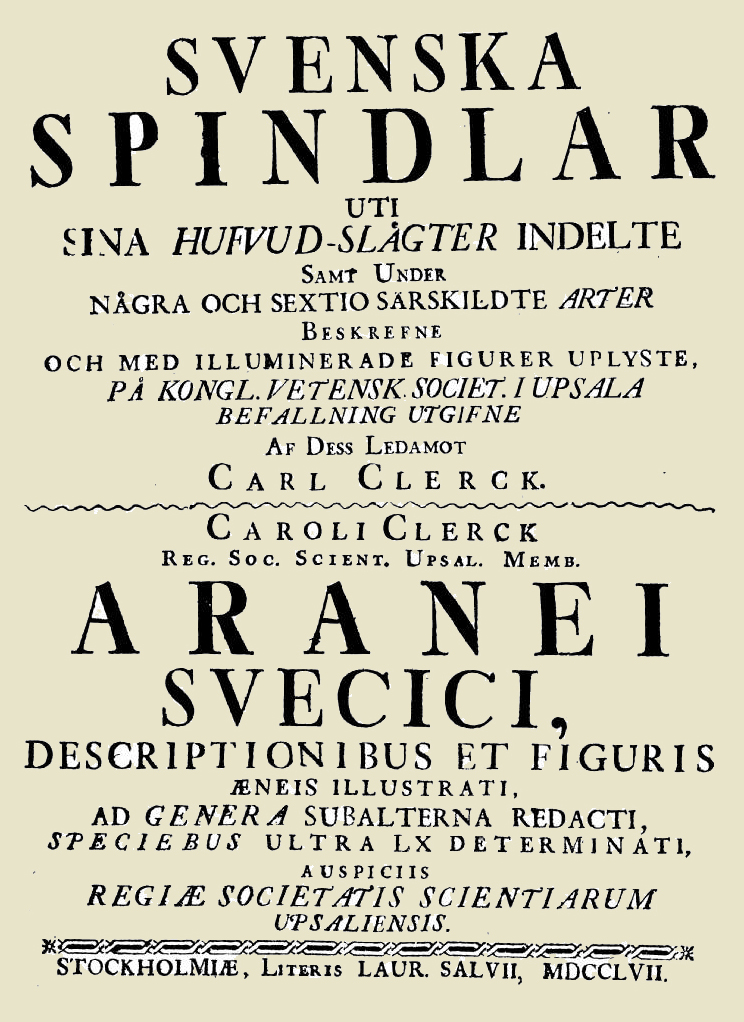
Title page of the 1757 edition of Clerck's Svenska Spindlar

Because of the exceptionally thorough treatment of the spider species, the scientific names proposed by Clerck in Svenska Spindlar (which were adopted by Carl Linnaeus in his Systema Naturae in 1758 with only minor modifications) had traditionally been recognized by arachnologists as binomial and available, later this was officially recognized in the International Code of Zoological Nomenclature. This means that in case of doubt the spelling of a spider name as from Clerck's 1757 work has priority over that proposed by Linnaeus in 1758 (an example is Araneus instead of Aranea), and that Clerck's spiders were the first animals in modern zoology to have obtained an available scientific name in the Linnean system. The name of the first species to have obtained an available name in the binomial system was Araneus angulatus.

He eventually became a friend and correspondent of Linnaeus, who appreciated his work greatly, and through his sponsorship was elected a member of the Royal Society of Sciences in Uppsala in 1756 and of the Royal Swedish Academy of Sciences in 1764.

Clerck's collection is in the Swedish Museum of Natural History.
