= Aptera in the 10th edition of Systema Naturae =

In the 10th edition of Systema Naturae, Carl Linnaeus classified the arthropods, including insects, arachnids and crustaceans, among his class "Insecta". Wingless arthropods were brought together under the name Aptera.

== Lepisma (silverfish) ==
- Lepisma saccharina
- Lepisma terrestris – [nomen dubium]

== Podura (springtails) ==
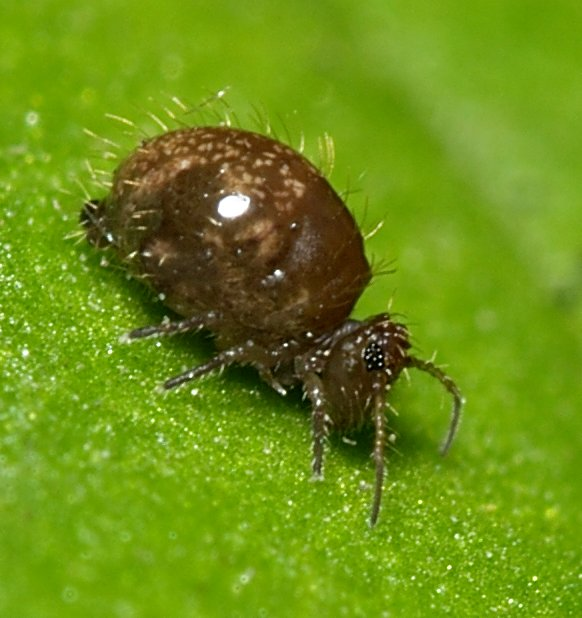
Allacma fusca was named Podura fusca in 1758.

- Podura viridis – Sminthurus viridis
- Podura atra – Dicyrtoma atra
- Podura fusca – Allacma fusca
- Podura plumbea – Pogonognathellus flavescens
- Podura nivalis – Entomobrya nivalis
- Podura arborea – Vertagopus arboreus
- Podura cincta – Orchesella cincta
- Podura aquatica – Podura aquatica
- Podura fimetaria – Folsomia fimetaria
- Podura ambulans – Onychiurus ambulans

== Termes (termites and Psocoptera) ==
- Termes fatale – Termes fatalis
- Termes pulsatorium – Trogium pulsatorium
- Termes fatidicum – Lachesilla pedicularia

== Pediculus (lice) ==
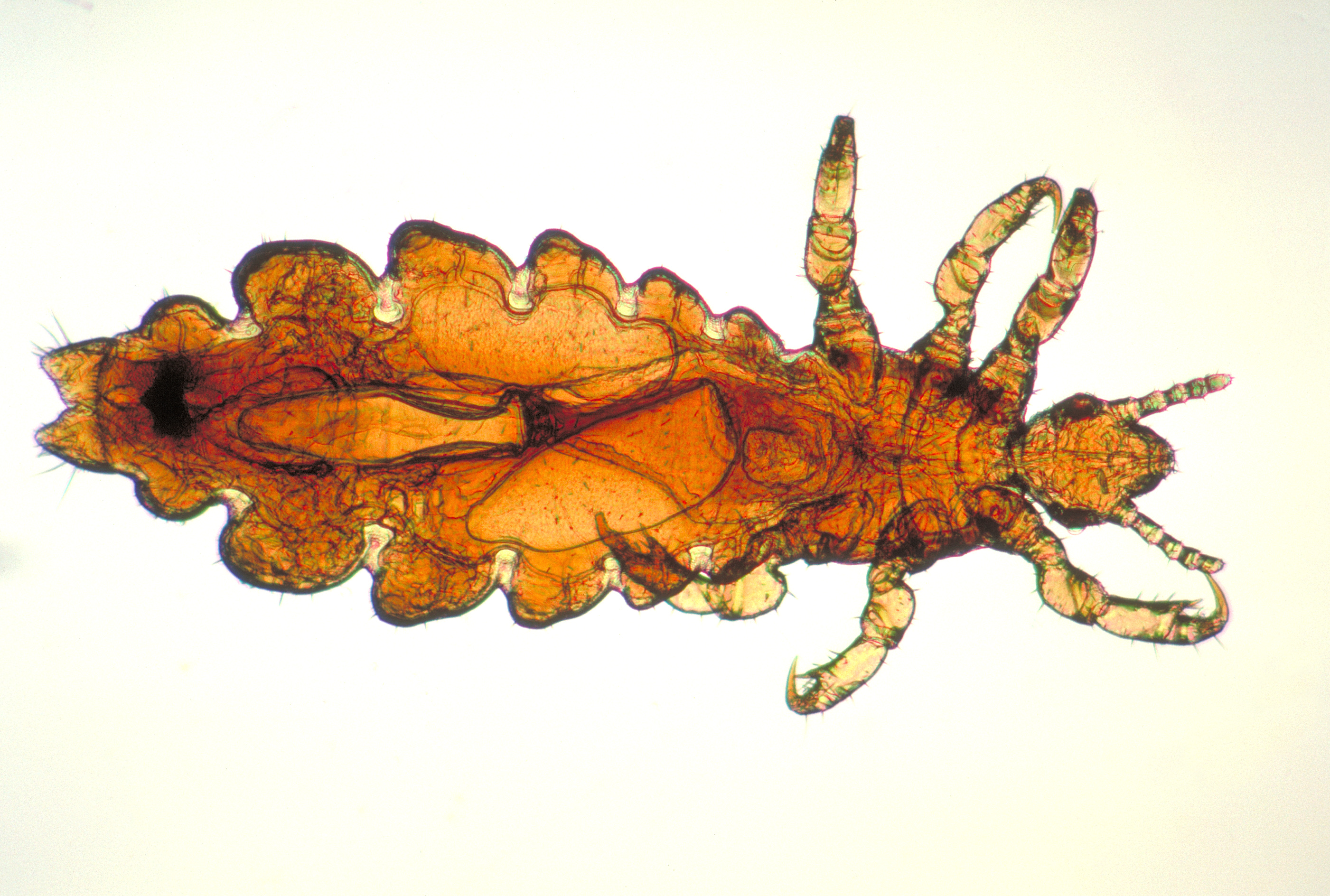
The head louse was named Pediculus humanus in 1758.

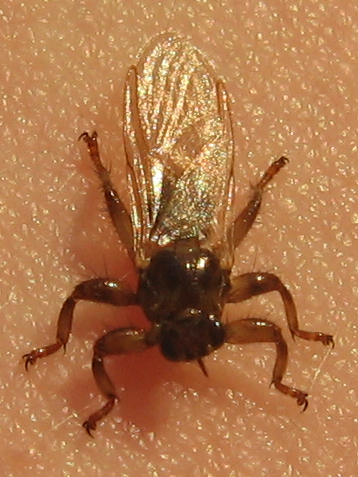
The fly Lipoptena cervi was classified among the lice as Pediculus cervi by Linnaeus.

- Pediculus humanus – head louse
- Pediculus pubis – crab louse
- Pediculus ricinoides
- Pediculus vespertilionis – [suppressed]
- Pediculus suis – Haematopinus suis
- Pediculus porcelli – [nomen nudum]
- Pediculus cameli – Microthoracius cameli
- Pediculus cervi – Lipoptena cervi
- Pediculus ovis – [nomen nudum]
- Pediculus bovis – Bovicola bovis
- Pediculus vituli – Linognathus vituli
- Pediculus equi – [nomen nudum]
- Pediculus asini – Haematopinus asini
- Pediculus tinnunculi – Laemobothrion tinnunculi
- Pediculus corvi – Philopterus corvi
- Pediculus infausti
- Pediculus picae – Myrsidea picae
- Pediculus cygni – Ornithobius cygni
- Pediculus anseris – Anaticola anseris
- Pediculus moschatae – Acidoproctus moschatae
- Pediculus querquedulae – Trinoton querquedulae
- Pediculus sternae – Saemundssonia sternae
- Pediculus plataleae – Ardeicola plataleae
- Pediculus ardeae – Ardeicola ardeae
- Pediculus gruis – Esthiopterum gruis
- Pediculus ciconiae – Ardeicola ciconiae
- Pediculus charadrii – Quadraceps charadrii
- Pediculus fulicae – Incidifrons fulicae
- Pediculus recurvirostrae – Cirrophthirius recurvirostrae
- Pediculus haematopi – Saemundssonia haematopi
- Pediculus pavonis – Goniodes pavonis
- Pediculus meleagridis – Chelopistes meleagridis
- Pediculus gallinae – Menopon gallinae
- Pediculus caponis – Lipeurus caponis
- Pediculus tetraonis – Goniodes tetraonis
- Pediculus lagopi – Goniodes lagopi
- Pediculus columbae – Columbicola columbae
- Pediculus pari
- Pediculus apis

== Pulex (fleas) ==
- Pulex irritans – human flea
- Pulex penetrans – chigoe flea Tunga penetrans

== Acarus (mites & ticks) ==
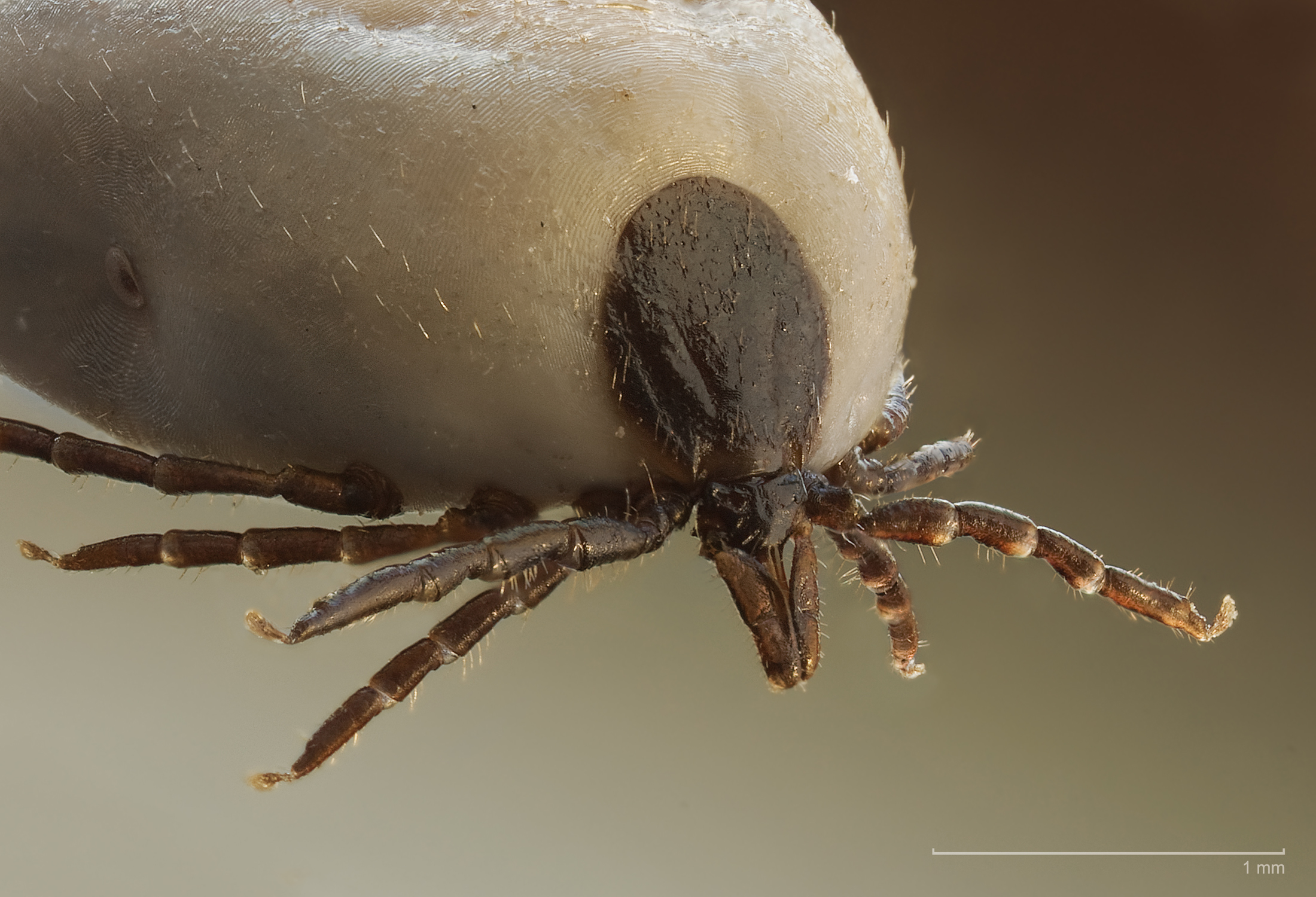
The castor bean tick, Ixodes ricinus, was named Acarus ricinus in 1758.

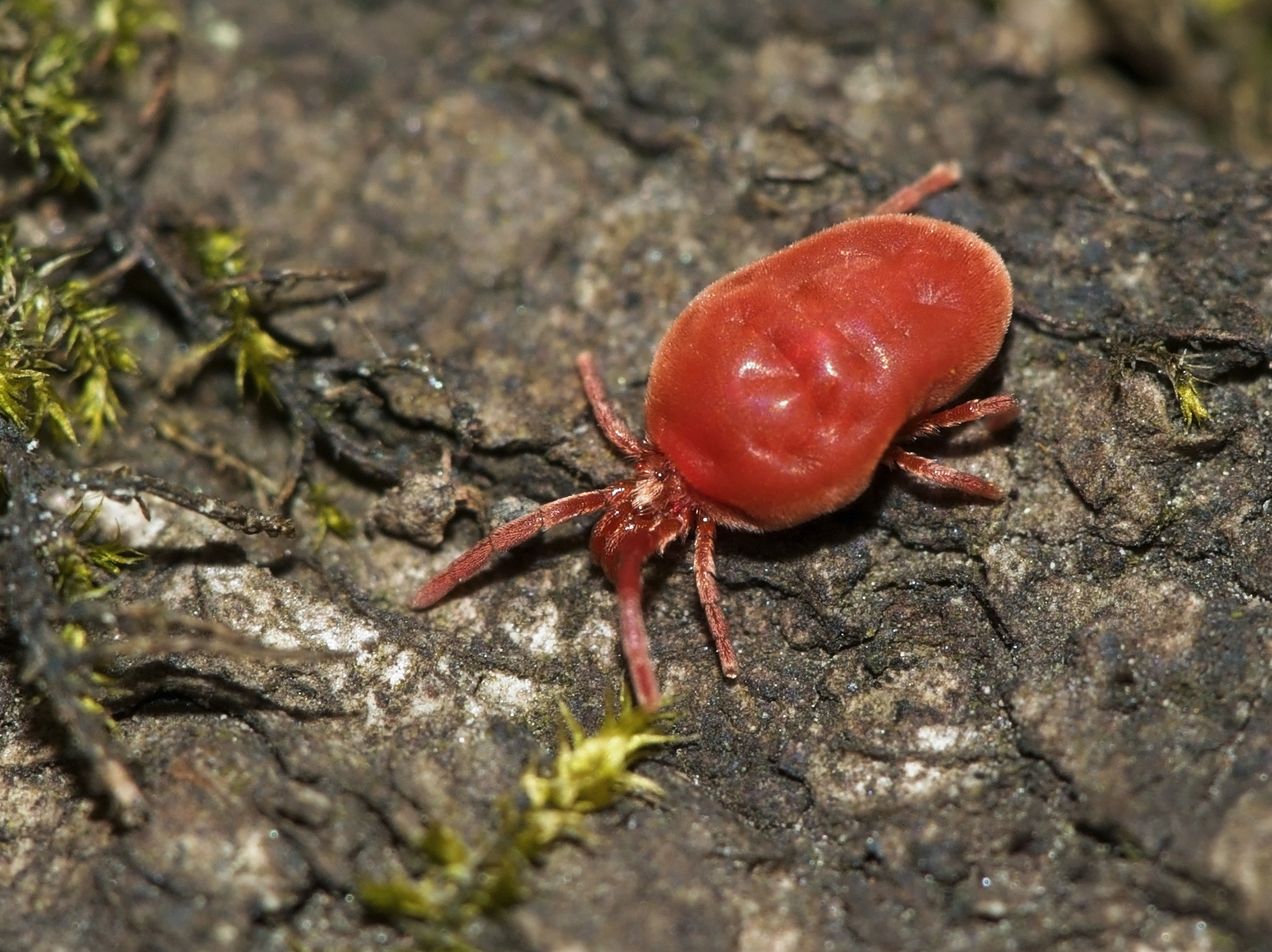
The velvet mite Trombidium holosericeum was named Acarus holosericeus in 1758.

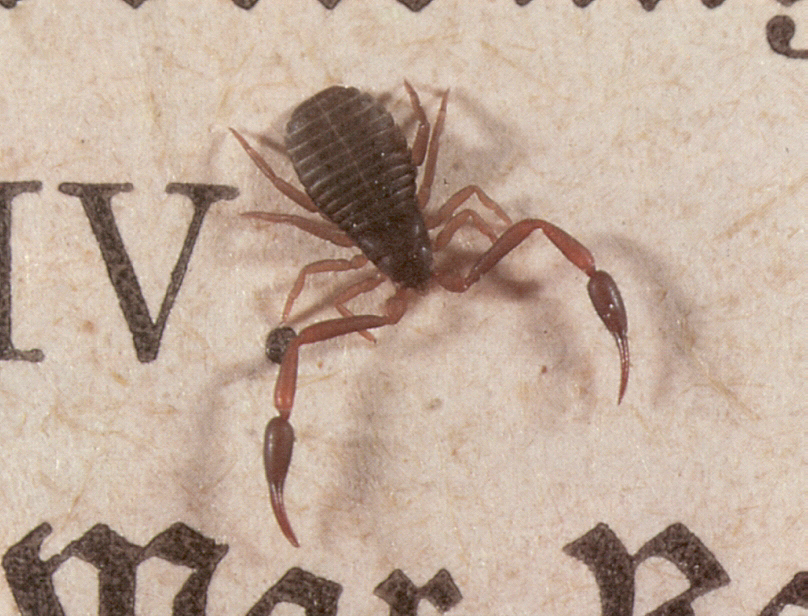
The pseudoscorpion Chelifer cancroides was named Acarus cancroides in 1758.

- Acarus elephantinus
- Acarus aegyptius – Hyalomma aegyptium
- Acarus reduvius, Acarus ricinus & Acarus sanguisugus – Ixodes ricinus
- Acarus americanus – Amblyomma americanum
- Acarus cancroides – Chelifer cancroides
- Acarus scorpioides – Cordylochernes scorpioides
- Acarus crassipes – Pergamasus crassipes
- Acarus passerinus – Analges passerinus
- Acarus motatorius – Linopodes motatorius
- Acarus aphidioides – Asca aphidoides
- Acarus coleoptratus – Achipteria coleoptrata
- Acarus telarius – Eotetranychus telarius
- Acarus siro – flour mite
- Acarus exulcerans
- Acarus geniculatus – Lucoppia geniculata
- Acarus aquaticus – Limnochares aquatica
- Acarus holosericeus – Trombidium holosericeum
- Acarus baccarum – Anystis baccarum
- Acarus muscarum – Myianoetus muscarum
- Acarus batatas – Eutrombicula batatas
- Acarus gymnopterorum
- Acarus coleoptratorum – Parasitus coleoptratorum
- Acarus rupestris – Erythraeus rupestris
- Acarus longicornis – Bdella longicornis
- Acarus littoralis – Neomolgus littoralis
- Acarus fungorum – Humerobates rostrolamellatus
- Acarus scaber – [species inquirenda]
- Acarus salicinus – Anystis salicinus
- Acarus croceus – [species inquirenda], Tydeus sp.

== Phalangium (harvestmen, Amblypygi, Uropygi) ==
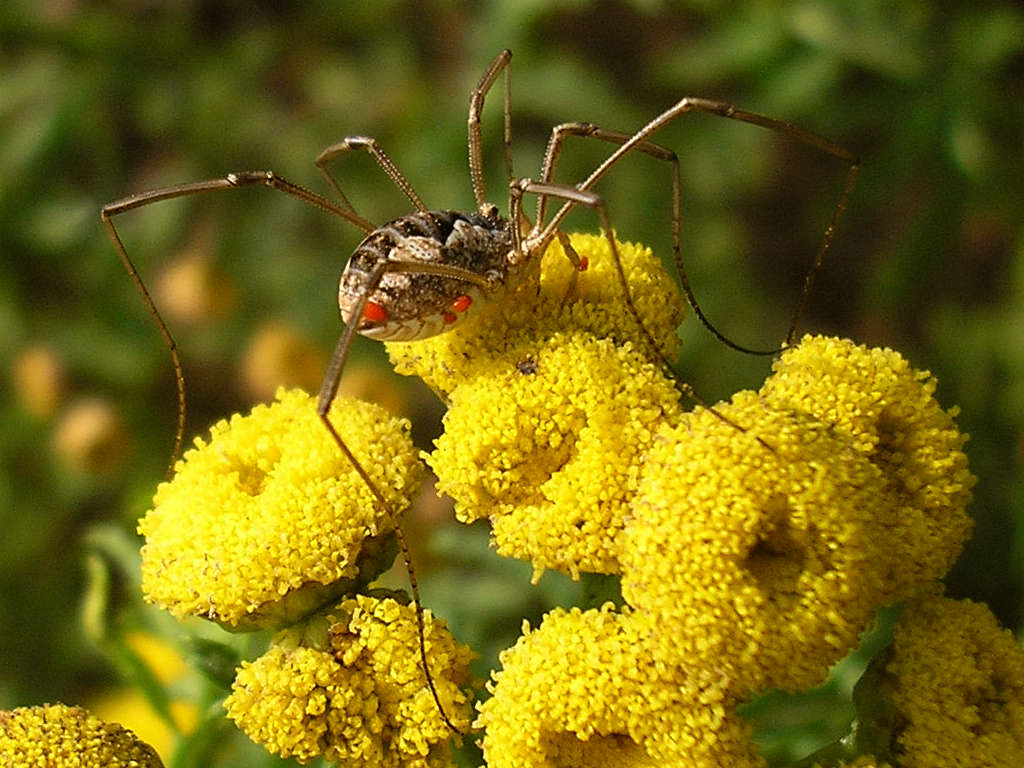
Phalangium opilio was named in 1758.

- Phalangium opilio
- Phalangium caudatum – Thelyphonus caudatus
- Phalangium reniforme – Phrynus ceylonicus C.L. Koch, 1843

== Aranea (spiders) ==
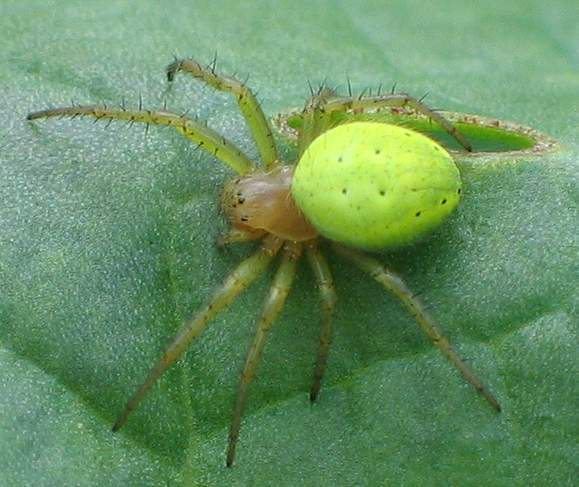
Araniella cucurbitina was named Aranea cucurbitina by Linnaeus.

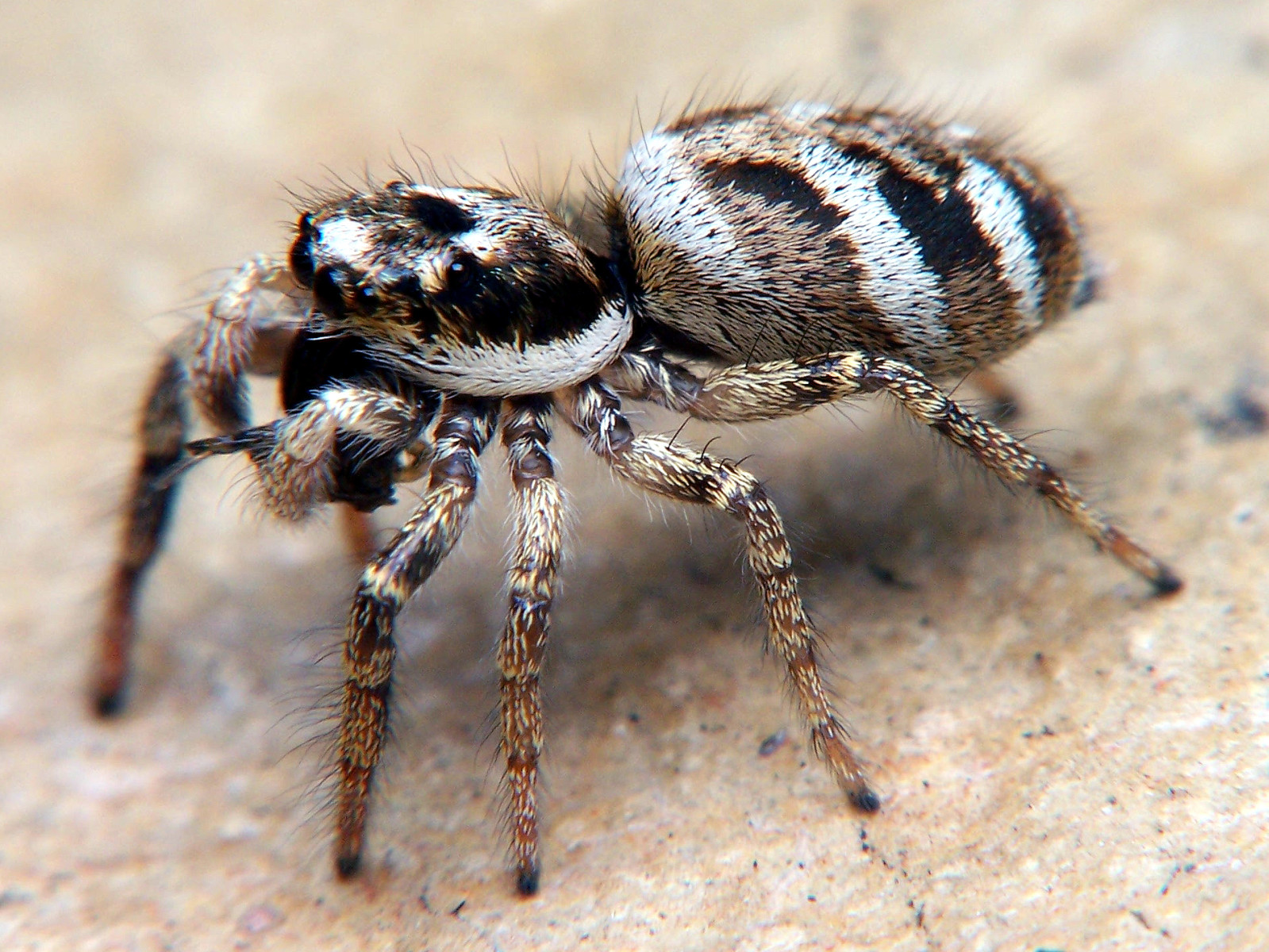
The zebra spider was named Aranea scenica by Linnaeus.

- Aranea diadema – European garden spider
- Aranea reticulata – Metellina segmentata
- Aranea cucurbitina – Araniella cucurbitina
- Aranea calycina – Misumena vatia
- Aranea bipunctata – Steatoda bipunctata
- Aranea arundinacea – Dictyna arundinacea
- Aranea angulata – Araneus angulatus
- Aranea domestica – Tegenaria domestica
- Aranea lineata – Stemonyphantes lineatus
- Aranea riparia & Aranea labyrinthica – Agelena labyrinthica
- Aranea redimita – Enoplognatha ovata
- Aranea corollata – [nomen dubium]
- Aranea fumigata – Pardosa amentata
- Aranea montana – Linyphia triangularis
- Aranea notata – Phylloneta sisyphia
- Aranea rufipes – Gongylidium rufipes
- Aranea nocturna – Callilepis nocturna
- Aranea extensa – Tetragnatha extensa
- Aranea fimbriata, Aranea palustris & Aranea virescens – raft spider
- Aranea sexpunctata – Nuctenea umbratica
- Aranea flavissima
- Aranea quadripunctata – Scotophaeus quadripunctatus
- Aranea holosericea – Clubiona pallidula
- Aranea senoculata – Segestria senoculata
- Aranea avicularia – pinktoe tarantula
- Aranea ocellata – [nomen dubium]
- Aranea tarantula – Lycosa tarantula
- Aranea scenica – zebra spider
- Aranea truncorum – [nomen dubium]
- Aranea rupestris – Evarcha falcata
- Aranea aquatica – diving bell spider
- Aranea saccata – Pardosa amentata
- Aranea viatica – Xysticus cristatus
- Aranea levipes – Philodromus margaritatus
- Aranea cancriformis – Gasteracantha cancriformis
- Aranea spinosa – Micrathena spinosa

== Scorpio (scorpions) ==
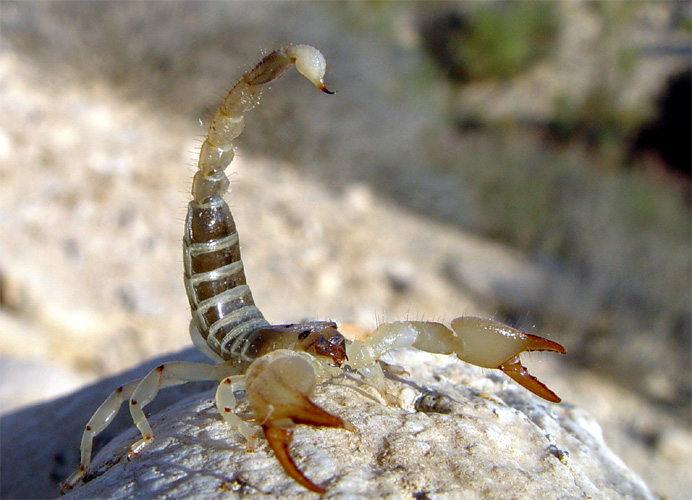
Scorpio maurus was described by Linnaeus in 1758. Most of the other scorpion names he coined are no longer in use.

- Scorpio maurus
- Scorpio afer – [nomen dubium]
- Scorpio americus – [nomen dubium]
- Scorpio europaeus – [suppressed]
- Scorpio australis – Androctonus australis

== Cancer (crabs, lobsters & kin) ==
=== Brachyuri (crabs) ===
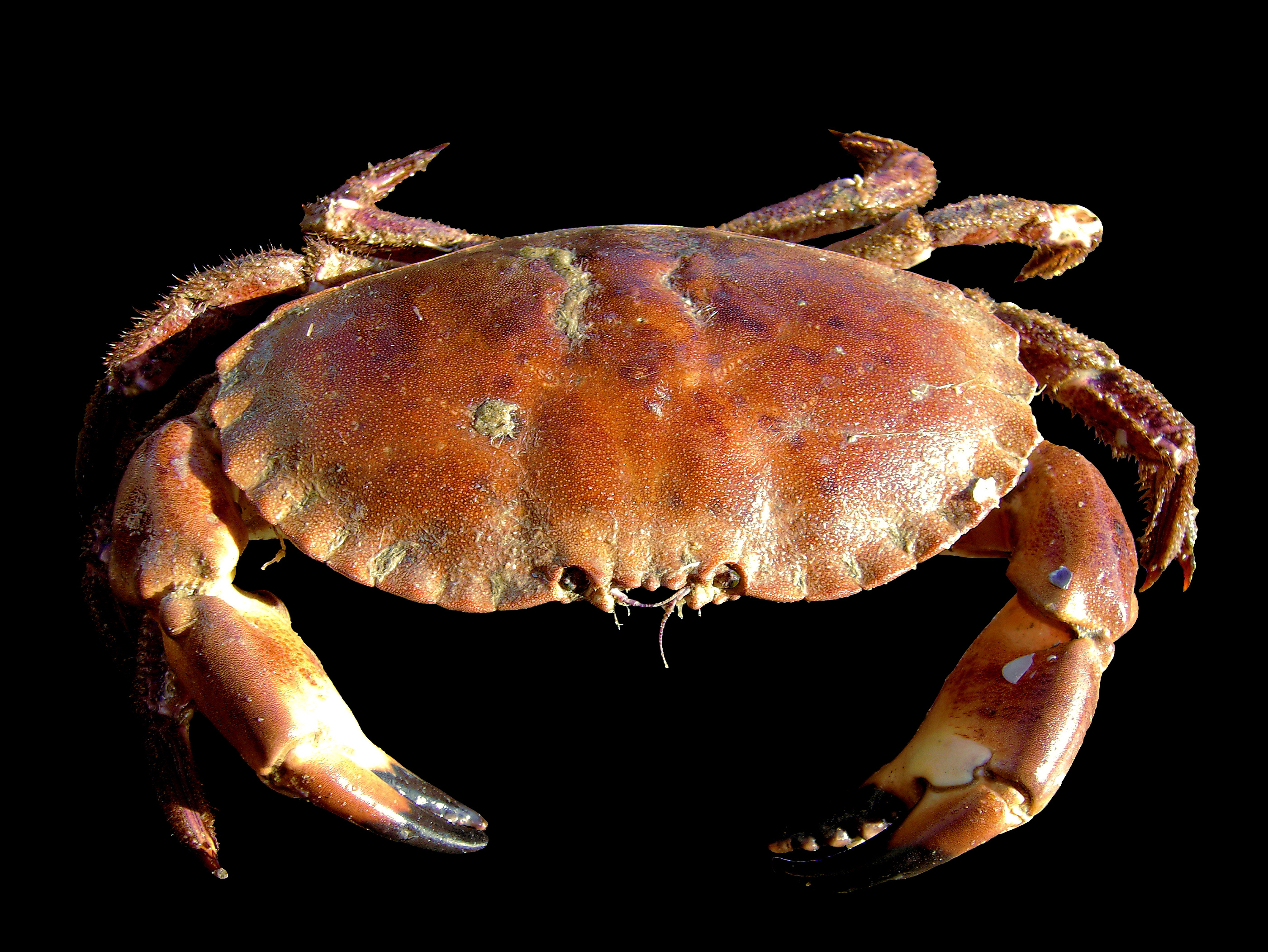
The "edible crab", Cancer pagurus, is the only one of Linnaeus' species to remain in the genus Cancer.

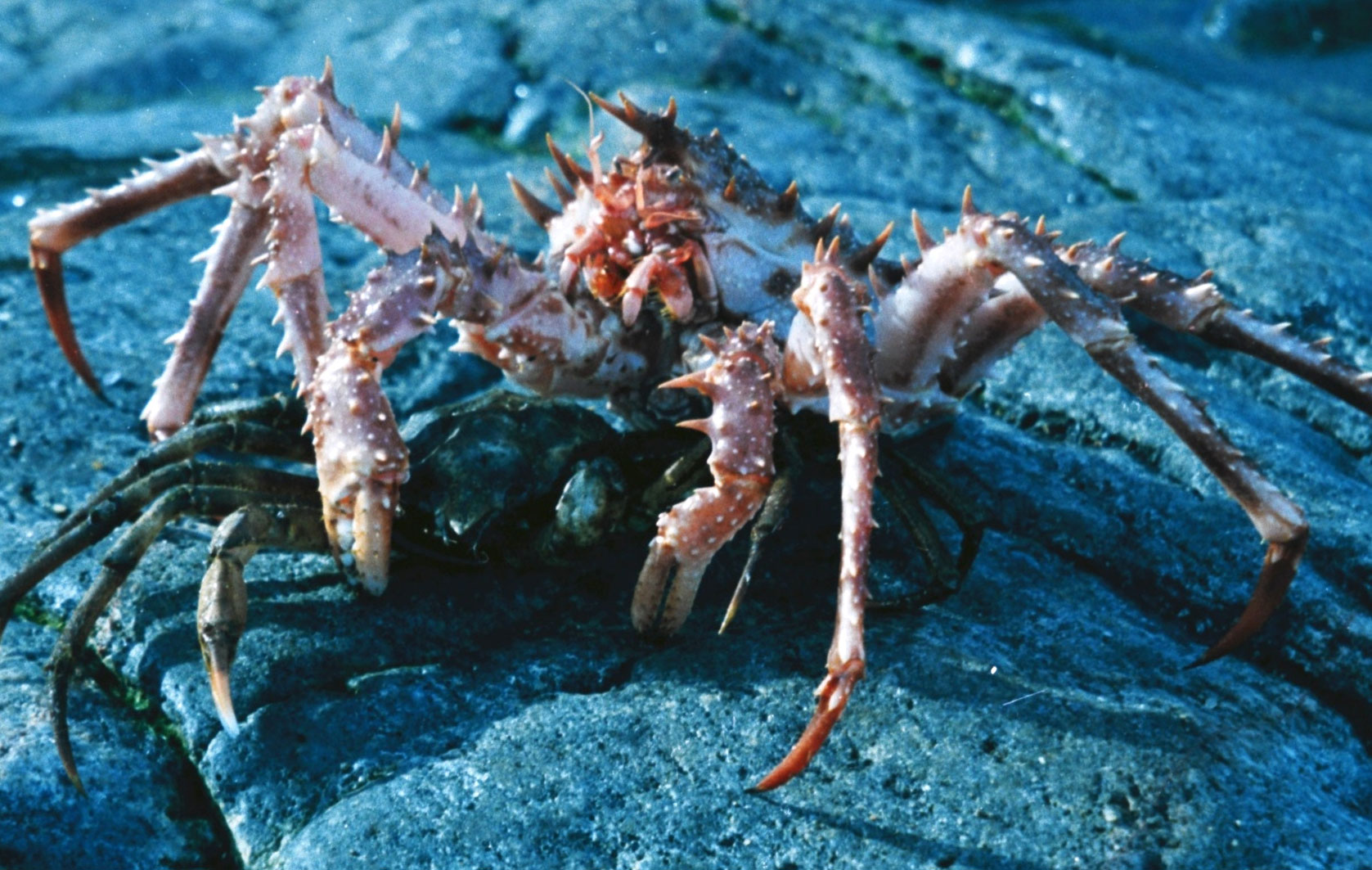
Lithodes maja (named Cancer maja in 1758) on top of Hyas araneus (named Cancer araneus in 1758).

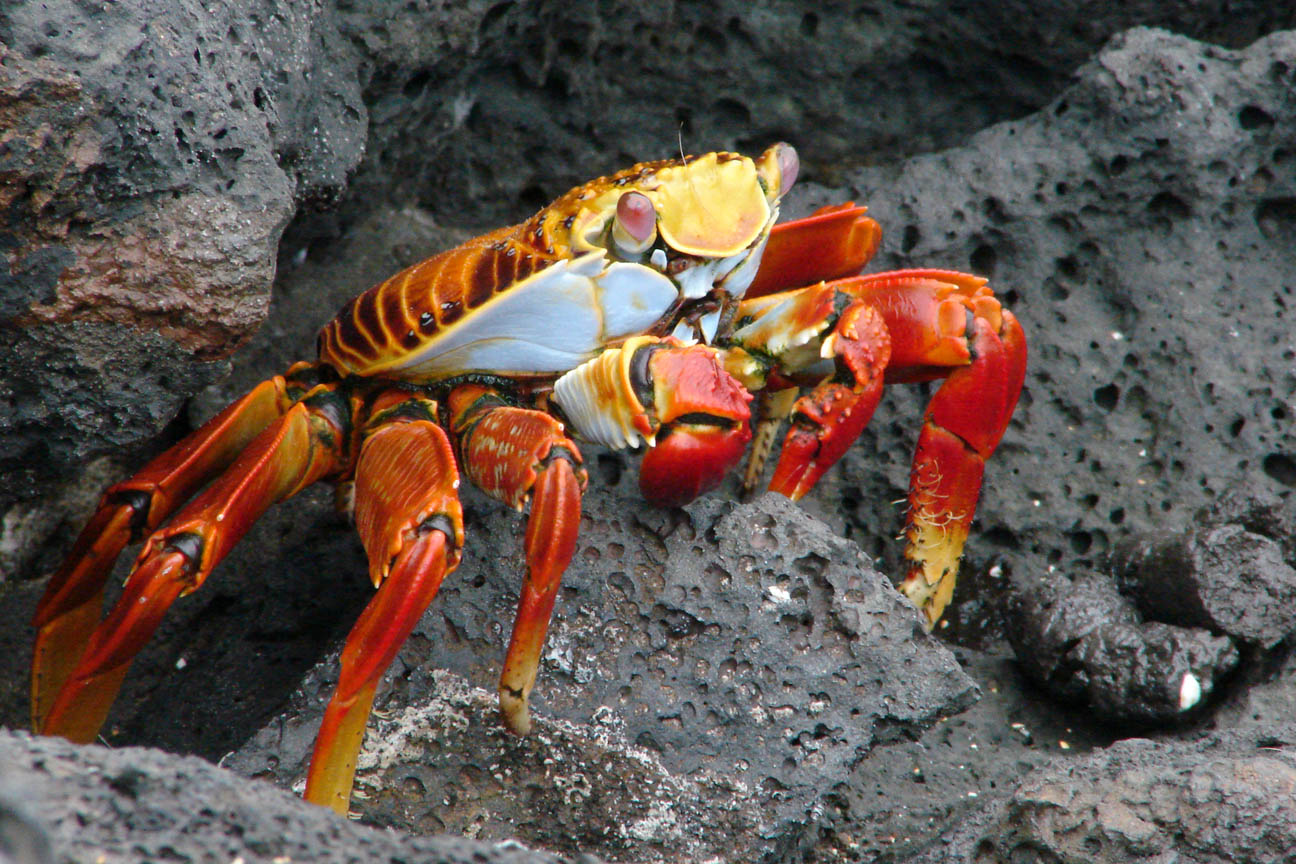
Grapsus grapsus ("Sally Lightfoot") was named Cancer grapsus in 1758.

- Cancer cursor – Ocypode cursor
- Cancer raninus – Ranina ranina
- Cancer mutus – Tetralia muta
- Cancer minutus – Planes minutus
- Cancer ruricola – Gecarcinus ruricola
- Cancer vocans – Gelasimus vocans
- Cancer craniolaris – Leucosia craniolaris
- Cancer philargius – Calappa philargius
- Cancer rhomboides – Goneplax rhomboides
- Cancer maculatus – Carpilius maculatus
- Cancer pelagicus – Portunus pelagicus
- Cancer nucleus – Ilia nucleus
- Cancer lactatus
- Cancer maenas – Carcinus maenas
- Cancer depurator – Liocarcinus depurator
- Cancer feriatus – Charybdis feriata
- Cancer granulatus – Calappa granulata
- Cancer pagurus
- Cancer chabrus – Plagusia chabrus
- Cancer araneus – great spider crab
- Cancer cuphaeus
- Cancer muscosus – Pisa muscosa
- Cancer personatus – Dromia personata
- Cancer pinnotheres – Nepinnotheres pinnotheres
- Cancer maja – Lithodes maja
- Cancer longimanus – Parthenope longimanus
- Cancer horridus – Daldorfia horrida
- Cancer cristatus – Micippa cristata
- Cancer superciliosus – Criocarcinus superciliosus
- Cancer cornutus – Maja cornuta
- Cancer longipes – Phalangipus longipes
- Cancer spinifer – [nomen dubium]
- Cancer cruentatus – Lissa chiragra
- Cancer hepaticus – Calappa hepatica
- Cancer calappa – Calappa calappa
- Cancer grapsus – Grapsus grapsus
- Cancer aeneus – Zosimus aeneus
- Cancer punctatus – Persephona punctata
- Cancer dorsipes – Notopus dorsipes
- Cancer symmysta – Albunea symmysta

=== Macrouri ===
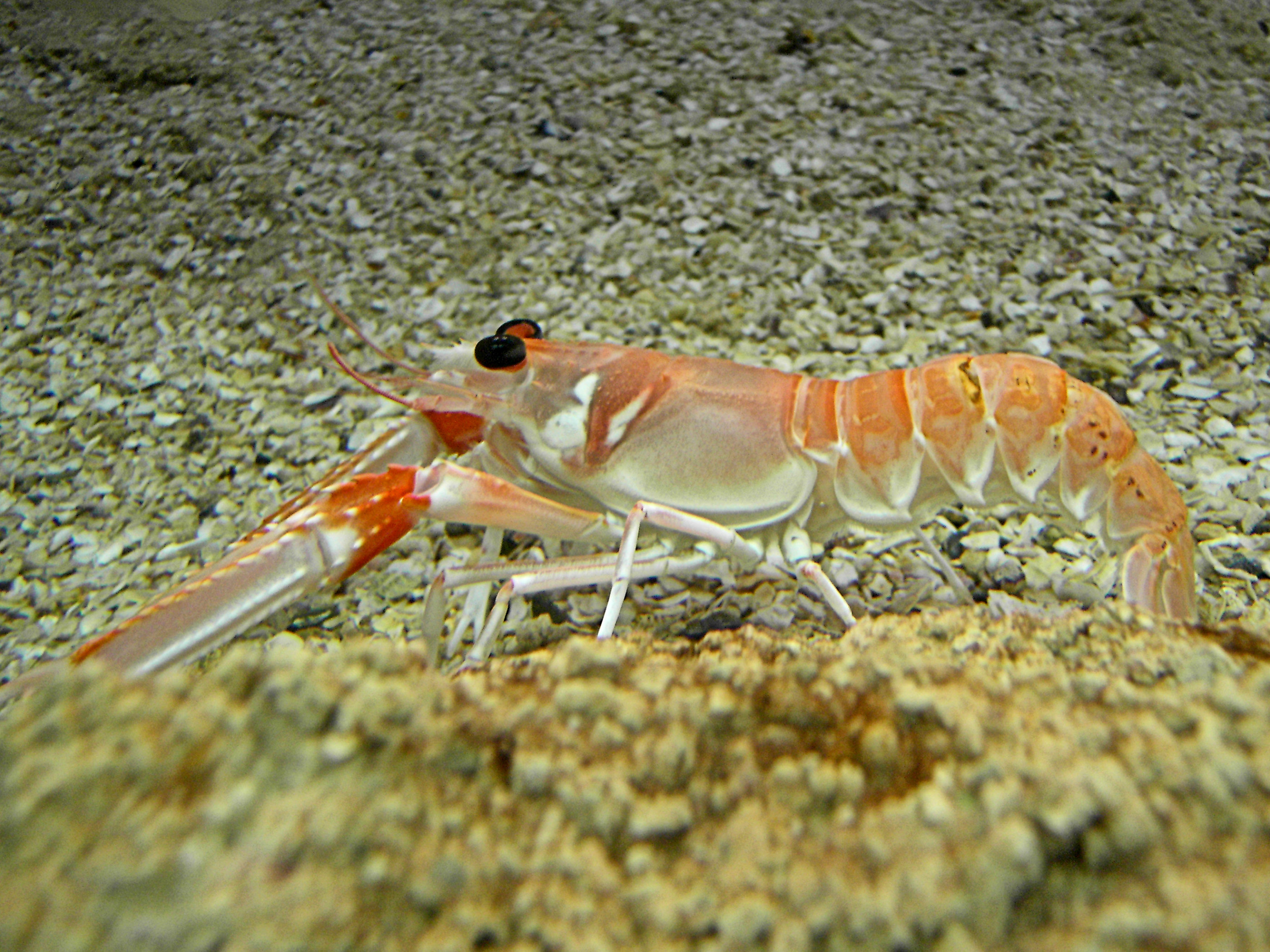
Nephrops norvegicus was named Cancer norvegicus in 1758.

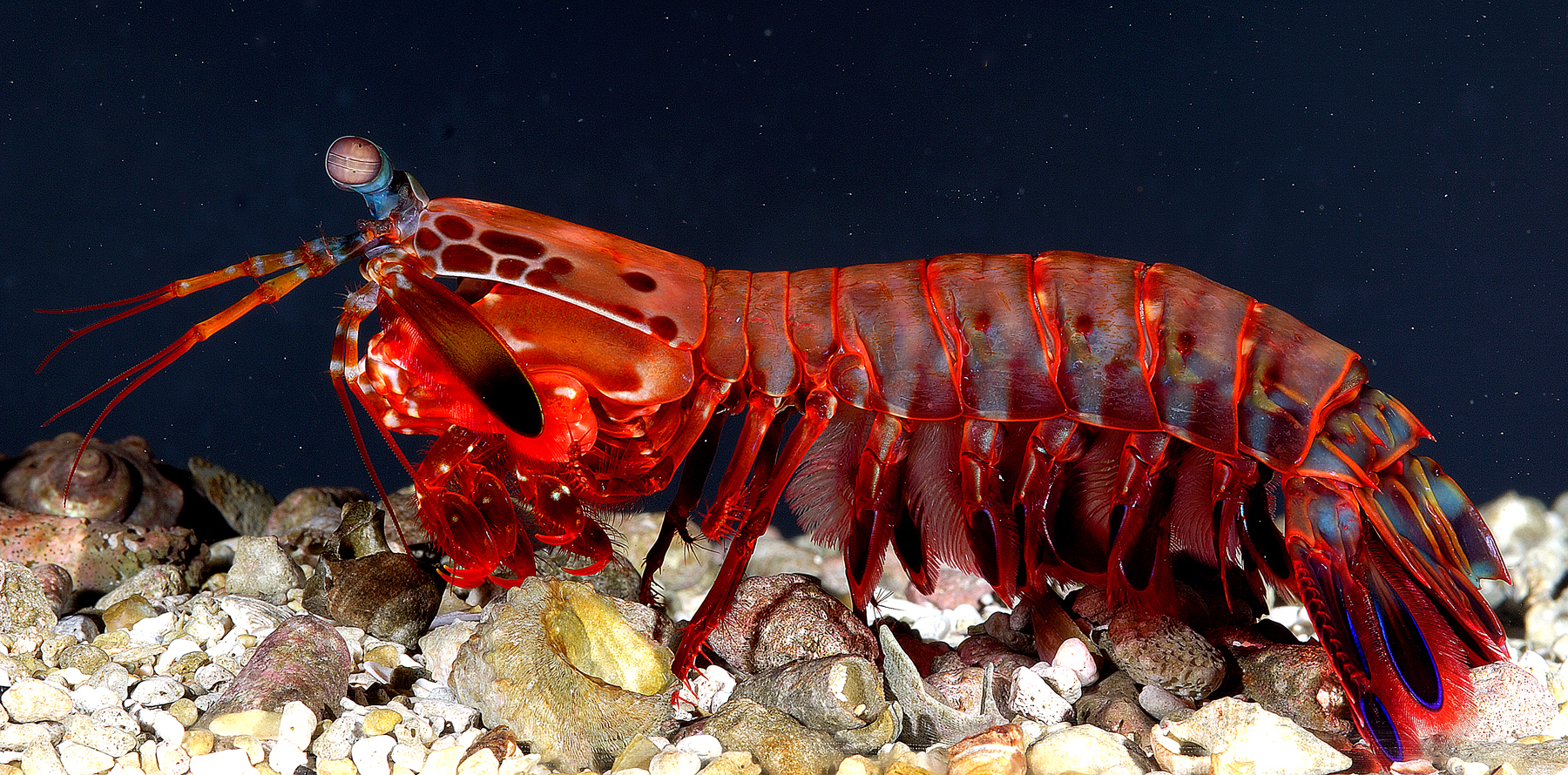
The peacock mantis shrimp, Odontodactylus scyllarus, was named Cancer scyllarus in 1758.

- Cancer bernhardus – Pagurus bernhardus
- Cancer diogenes – Petrochirus diogenes
- Cancer gammarus – European lobster
- Cancer astacus – Astacus astacus
- Cancer carcinus – Macrobrachium carcinus
- Cancer pennaceus – Leander tenuicornis (Note: Georges-Louis Leclerc, Comte de Buffon indicates Cancer pennaceus as a synonym of Palaemon locusta Fabricius, which is now known as Leander tenuicornis.)
- Cancer squilla – Palaemon adspersus
- Cancer crangon – Crangon crangon
- Cancer carabus – Albunea carabus
- Cancer cancharus – possibly Galathea strigosa
- Cancer pilosus
- Cancer norvegicus – Norway lobster
- Cancer homarus – Panulirus homarus
- Cancer arctus – Scyllarus arctus
- Cancer mantis – Squilla mantis
- Cancer scyllarus – peacock mantis shrimp
- Cancer pulex – Gammarus pulex
- Cancer locusta – Gammarus locusta
- Cancer salinus – Artemia salina
- Cancer stagnalis – Tanymastix stagnalis

== Monoculus (branchiopods & kin) ==
(Note: The generic name Monoculus was suppressed in Opinion 288 of the ICZN in 1954.)

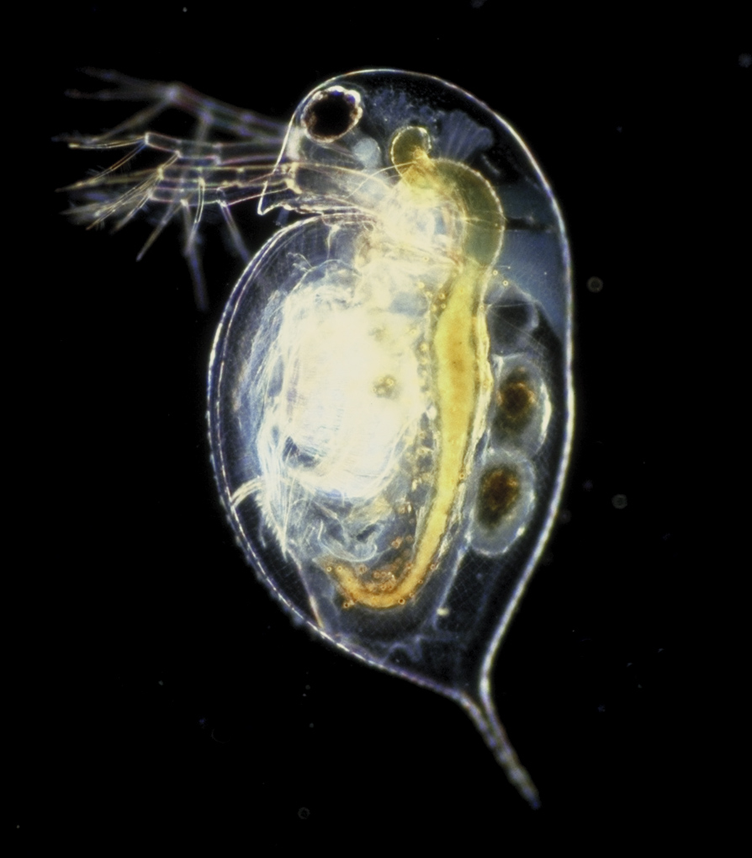
Daphnia pulex was named Monoculus pulex in 1758.

- Monoculus polyphemus – Atlantic horseshoe crab
- Monoculus foliaceus – Argulus foliaceus
- Monoculus apus – Lepidurus apus
- Monoculus pulex – Daphnia pulex
- Monoculus pediculus – Polyphemus pediculus
- Monoculus quadricornis – Cyclops quadricornis
- Monoculus conchaceus – Cypris conchacea
- Monoculus lenticularis – Limnadia lenticularis
- Monoculus telemus – Cavolinia tridentata (Forskål, 1775) (a mollusc)

== Oniscus (woodlice) ==
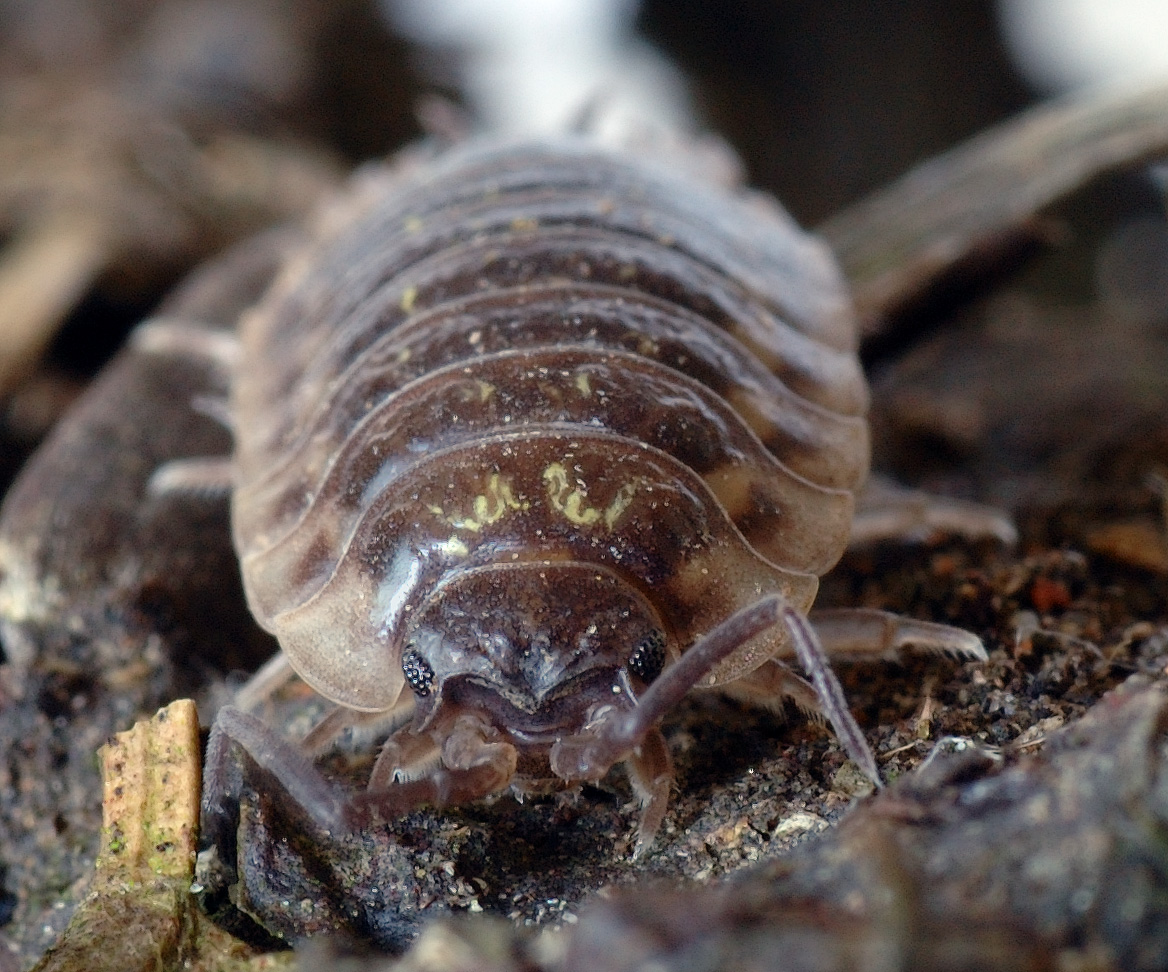
Oniscus asellus was named in 1758.

- Oniscus asilus
- Oniscus oestrum – Cymothoa oestrum
- Oniscus psora – Aega psora
- Oniscus physodes – Anilocra physodes
- Oniscus entomon – Saduria entomon
- Oniscus ceti – Cyamus ceti
- Oniscus marinus – Idotea marina
- Oniscus scopulorum – Cymothoa scopulorum
- Oniscus aquaticus – Asellus aquaticus
- Oniscus asellus
- Oniscus armadillo – [nomen dubium]

== Scolopendra (centipedes) ==
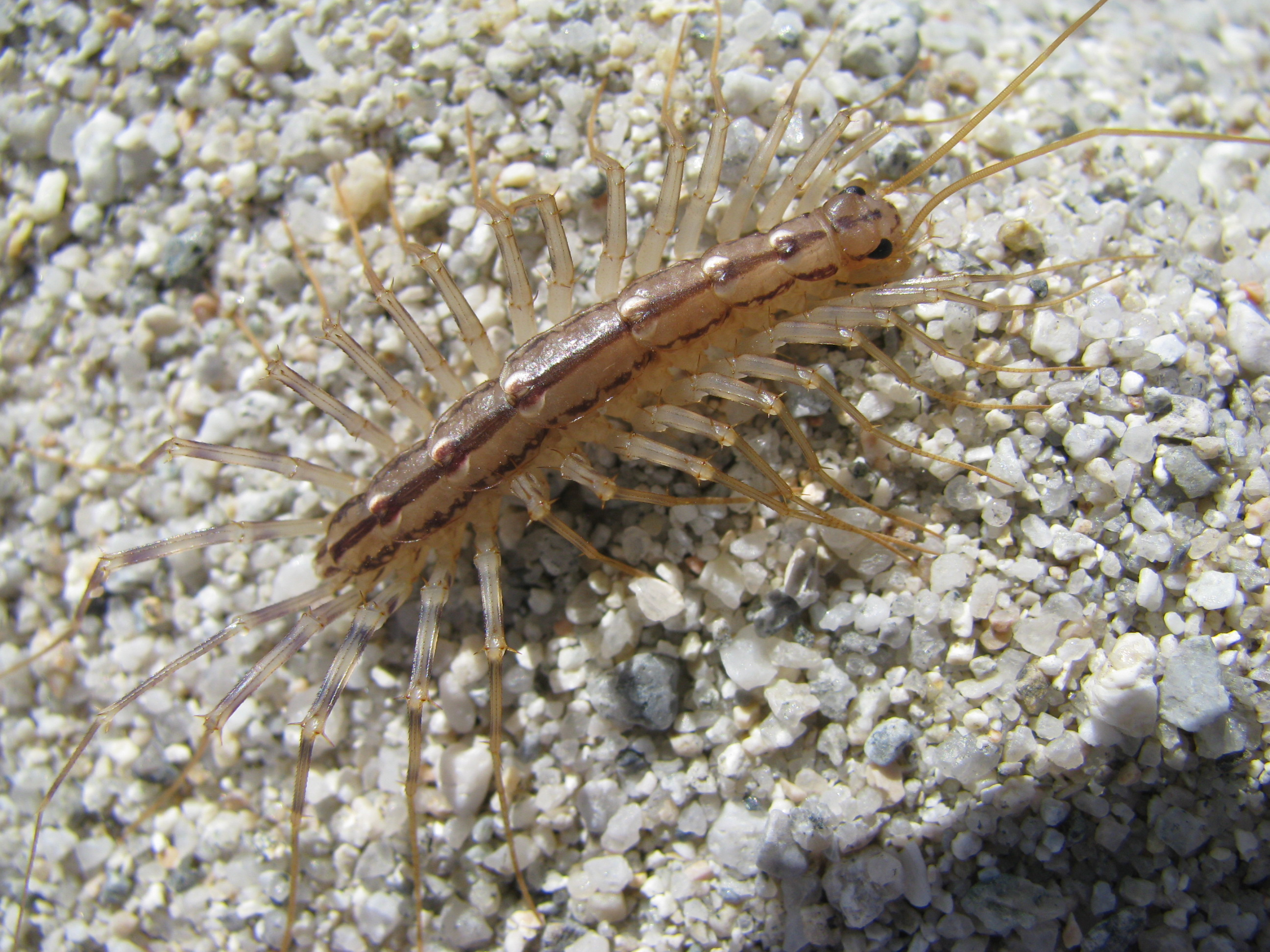
Scutigera coleoptrata was named Scolopendra coleoptrata in 1758.

- Scolopendra lagura – Polyxenus lagurus
- Scolopendra coleoptrata – Scutigera coleoptrata
- Scolopendra forficata – Lithobius forficatus
- Scolopendra gigantea
- Scolopendra morsitans
- Scolopendra electrica – Geophilus electricus
- Scolopendra phosphorea – Orphnaeus brevilabiatus
- Scolopendra occidentalis – [nomen dubium]
- Scolopendra marina

== Julus (millipedes) ==
- Julus ovalis – Cryxus ovalis
- Julus crassus
- Julus terrestris
- Julus indus – Spirostreptus indus
- Julus sabulosus – Ommatoiulus sabulosus
- Julus fuscus
- Julus maximus – Spirocyclistus maximus
