= Devil crab =

Devil crab may refer to:

- Velvet crab, Necora puber, a crab of the family Portunidae
- Zosimus aeneus, a crab of the family Xanthidae

== See also ==
- Deviled crab
