= Limnochares americana =

Scientific classification
- Domain: Eukaryota
- Kingdom: Animalia
- Phylum: Arthropoda
- Subphylum: Chelicerata
- Class: Arachnida
- Order: Trombidiformes
- Family: Limnocharidae
- Genus: Limnochares
- Species: L. americana

Binomial name
- Limnochares americana Lundblad, 1941

Species of mite

Limnochares americana is a species of mite in the family Limnocharidae.
