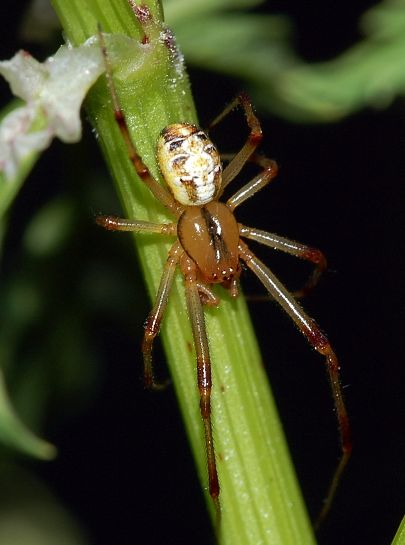
- Phylloneta impressa

Scientific classification
- Kingdom: Animalia
- Phylum: Arthropoda
- Subphylum: Chelicerata
- Class: Arachnida
- Order: Araneae
- Infraorder: Araneomorphae
- Family: Theridiidae
- Genus: Phylloneta; Archer, 1950

Type species
- Theridion pictipes (Keyserling, 1884)

Species
- P. impressa (L. Koch, 1881); P. pictipes (Keyserling, 1884); P. sisyphia (Clerck, 1757); P. s. foliifera (Thorell, 1875); P. s. torandae (Strand, 1917)

= Phylloneta =

Genus of spiders

Phylloneta is a genus of comb-footed spiders formerly considered a sub-genus of Allotheridion, and raised to genus status in 2008. The type species was first described by Eugen von Keyserling in 1884 as Theridion pictipes. As of September 2019 it contains three species and two subspecies with a holarctic distribution: P. impressa, P. pictipes, P. sisyphia, P. s. foliifera, and P. s. torandae.

== See also ==
- Theridion
