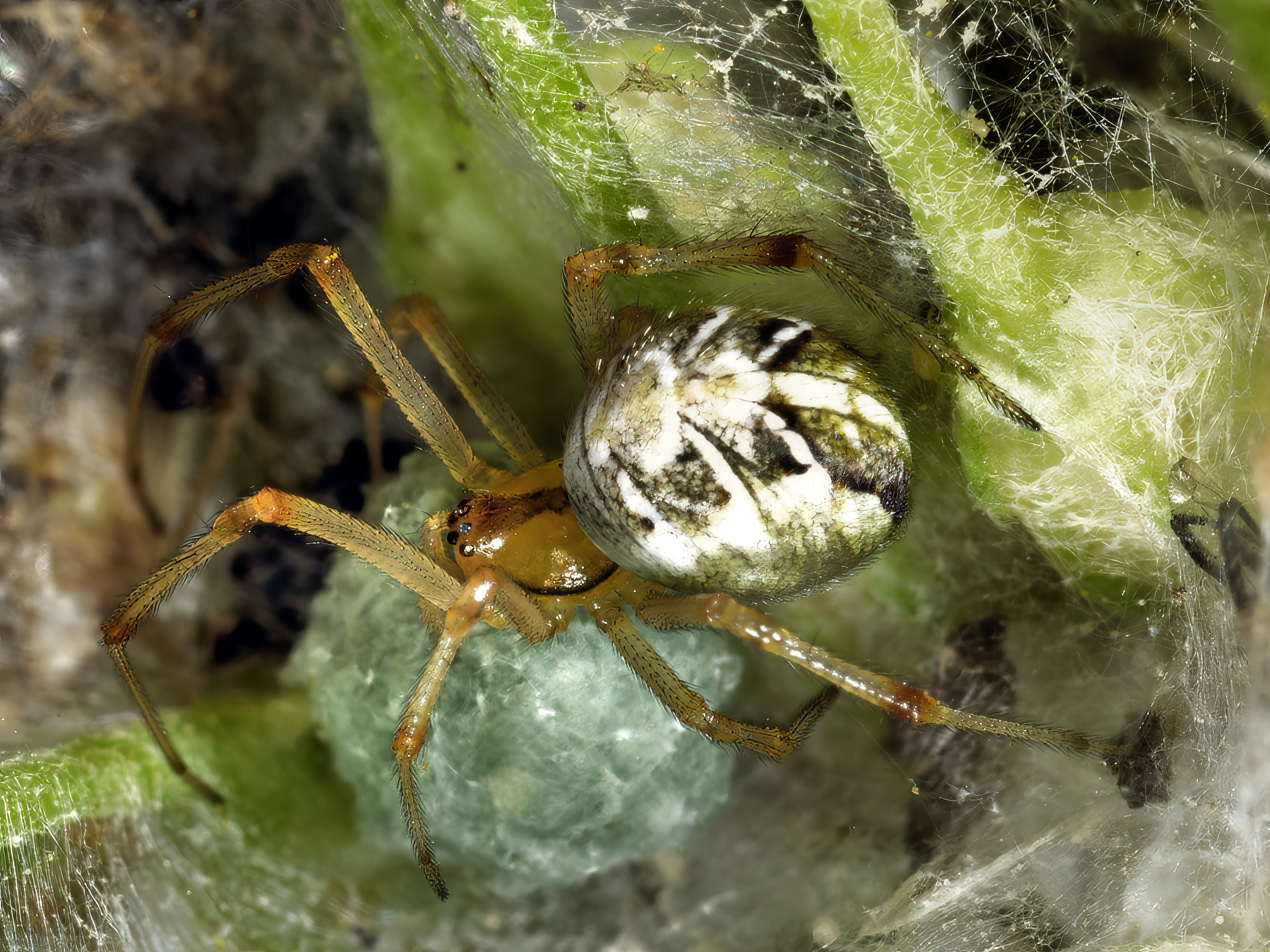
- Phylloneta impressa in his nest

Scientific classification
- Domain: Eukaryota
- Kingdom: Animalia
- Phylum: Arthropoda
- Subphylum: Chelicerata
- Class: Arachnida
- Order: Araneae
- Infraorder: Araneomorphae
- Family: Theridiidae
- Genus: Phylloneta
- Species: P. impressa

Binomial name
- Phylloneta impressa (L. Koch, 1881)

Synonyms
- Theridion impressum L. Koch, 1881; Theridion botezati Rosca, 1935; Theridion frigicola Chamberlin & Ivie, 1947; Aranea scopulorum Schrank, 1803; Allotheridion impressum (L. Koch, 1881)

= Phylloneta impressa =

Species of spider

Phylloneta impressa is a species of comb-footed spider from the genus Phylloneta with a Holarctic distribution.

== Description ==
The body length of the male is 2.5-5.5 mm, female body length is 3.5-5.5 mm.

Very similar to Phylloneta sisyphia, the prosoma is reddish yellow, with a broad, brown-black margin and a median stripe. The sternum is reddish yellow and has a dark margin. The chelicerae are reddish yellow, and the legs are reddish yellow, annulated with brown. The opisthosoma is yellowish or reddish, with a dark brown pattern consisting of spots on the back.

== Distribution ==
This species has a Holarctic distribution, it is widespread in western Europe although it has not been recorded in Iceland. In Britain it is common in south and central England and becomes scarcer or even absent as one moves west and north.

== Biology ==
Phylloneta impressa builds a similar retreat to that of P. sisyphia and in the similar habitats. Both species can sometimes be found together on gorse, heather and thorny bushes, below its retreat the spider spins the typical tangle web which gives some members of the family Theridiidae the common name tangle-web spiders. Phylloneta impressa has also been found on rush florets in the upper reaches of saltmarshes. The adult males have been recorded between May and August, adult females between June and October, and even on one exceptional occasion in December. The males peak in occurrence during June and July, the females in July and August, which is later than P. sisyphia. Adult males have been found mate-guarding immature females in the retreats. A single, spherical blue-green egg-sac is produced by the female in August and September, again slightly later than P. sisyphia, and are kept within the retreat. When they emerge the juveniles are fed orally by the female, in a similar way to P. sisyphia.
