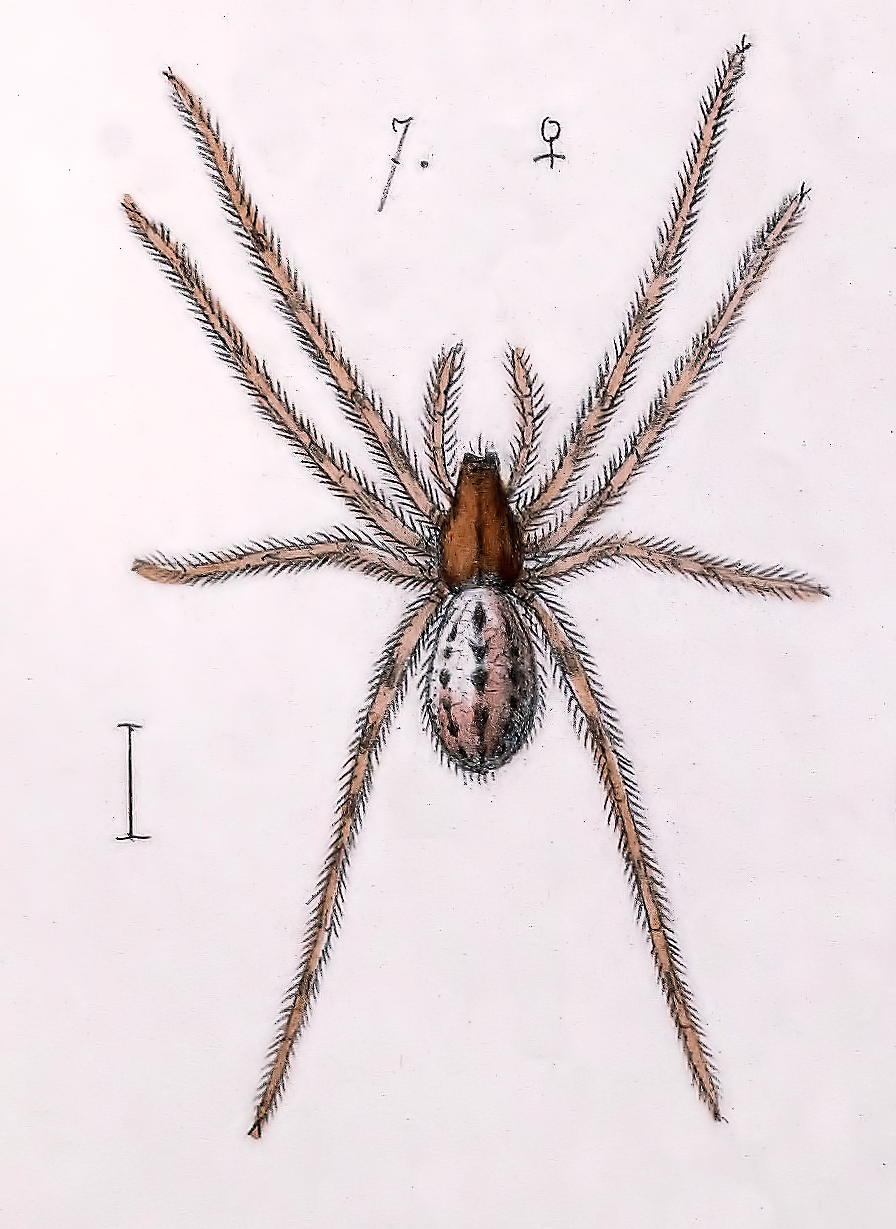

Scientific classification
- Kingdom: Animalia
- Phylum: Arthropoda
- Subphylum: Chelicerata
- Class: Arachnida
- Order: Araneae
- Infraorder: Araneomorphae
- Family: Linyphiidae
- Genus: Stemonyphantes; Menge, 1866

Type species
- S. lineatus (Linnaeus, 1758)

Species
- 20, see text

Synonyms
- Narcissius Ermolajew, 1930

= Stemonyphantes =

Genus of spiders

Stemonyphantes is a genus of sheet weavers that was first described by Anton Menge in 1866.

== Species ==
As of August 2021 it contains twenty species, found in Asia, Canada, and the United States:

- Stemonyphantes abantensis Wunderlich, 1978 – Turkey
- Stemonyphantes agnatus Tanasevitch, 1990 – Ukraine, Russia, Georgia, Azerbaijan
- Stemonyphantes altaicus Tanasevitch, 2000 – Russia, Kazakhstan
- Stemonyphantes blauveltae Gertsch, 1951 – USA, Canada
- Stemonyphantes conspersus (L. Koch, 1879) – Central Europe to Kazakhstan
- Stemonyphantes curvipes Tanasevitch, 1989 – Kyrgyzstan
- Stemonyphantes griseus (Schenkel, 1936) – Kyrgyzstan, China
- Stemonyphantes grossus Tanasevitch, 1985 – Kyrgyzstan
- Stemonyphantes karatau Tanasevitch & Esyunin, 2012 – Kazakhstan
- Stemonyphantes lineatus (Linnaeus, 1758) (type) – Europe, Caucasus, Russia to Central Asia, China
- Stemonyphantes menyuanensis Hu, 2001 – China
- Stemonyphantes mikhailovi Omelko & Marusik, 2021 – Russia (Far East)
- Stemonyphantes montanus Wunderlich, 1978 – Turkey
- Stemonyphantes parvipalpus Tanasevitch, 2007 – Russia
- Stemonyphantes serratus Tanasevitch, 2011 – Turkey
- Stemonyphantes sibiricus (Grube, 1861) – Russia (mainland, Kurile Is.), Kazakhstan, Mongolia
- Stemonyphantes solitudus Tanasevitch, 1994 – Turkmenistan
- Stemonyphantes taiganoides Tanasevitch, Esyunin & Stepina, 2012 – Russia, Kazakhstan
- Stemonyphantes taiganus (Ermolajev, 1930) – Russia
- Stemonyphantes verkana Zamani & Marusik, 2021 – Iran
