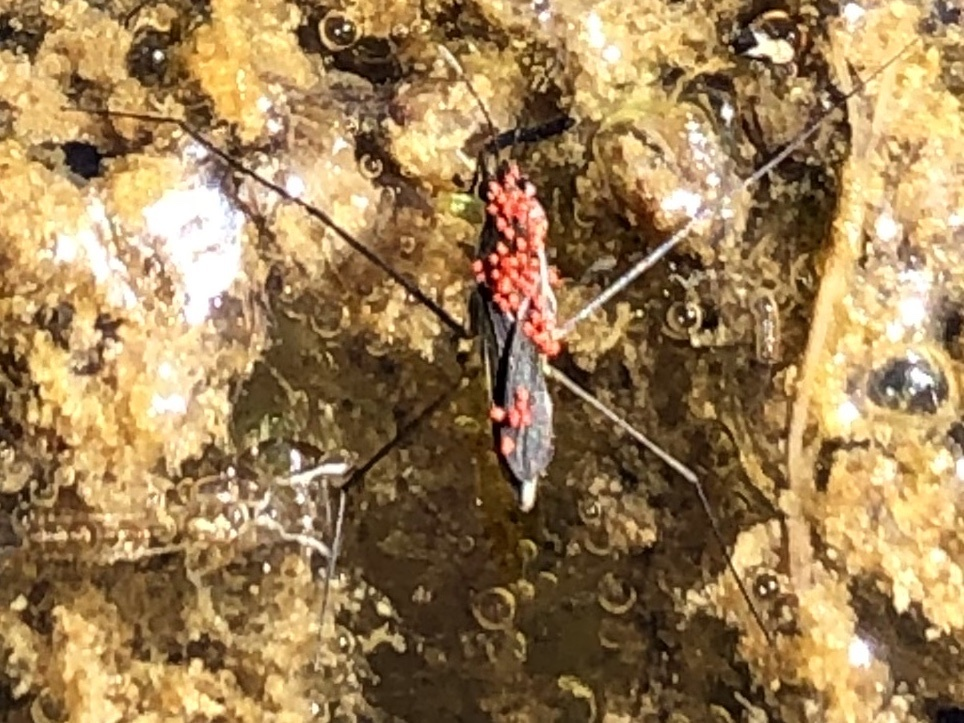
- On a water strider (Gerridae sp.)

Scientific classification
- Domain: Eukaryota
- Kingdom: Animalia
- Phylum: Arthropoda
- Subphylum: Chelicerata
- Class: Arachnida
- Order: Trombidiformes
- Family: Limnocharidae
- Genus: Limnochares
- Species: L. aquatica

Binomial name
- Limnochares aquatica (Linnaeus, 1758)

= Limnochares aquatica =

Species of mite

Limnochares aquatica is a species of arachnid belonging to the family Limnocharidae. It is native to Eurasia and North America.
