= Phylloneta pictipes =

Scientific classification
- Kingdom: Animalia
- Phylum: Arthropoda
- Subphylum: Chelicerata
- Class: Arachnida
- Order: Araneae
- Infraorder: Araneomorphae
- Family: Theridiidae
- Genus: Phylloneta
- Species: P. pictipes

Binomial name
- Phylloneta pictipes (Keyserling, 1884)

Species of spider

Phylloneta pictipes is a species of cobweb spider in the family Theridiidae. It is found in the United States. There is no common name for this type of spider other than a cobweb spider.

== Webs ==
The phylloneta pictipes builds cobwebs (More details in Spider web).

== Look/Color ==
The phylloneta pictipes is yellow with interestingly patterned black spots on the abdomen. The cephalothorax is comparatively smaller than the abdomen. The legs look to have either a clear see-through color or a lighter clearer yellow-green color. The legs also have black bands.
