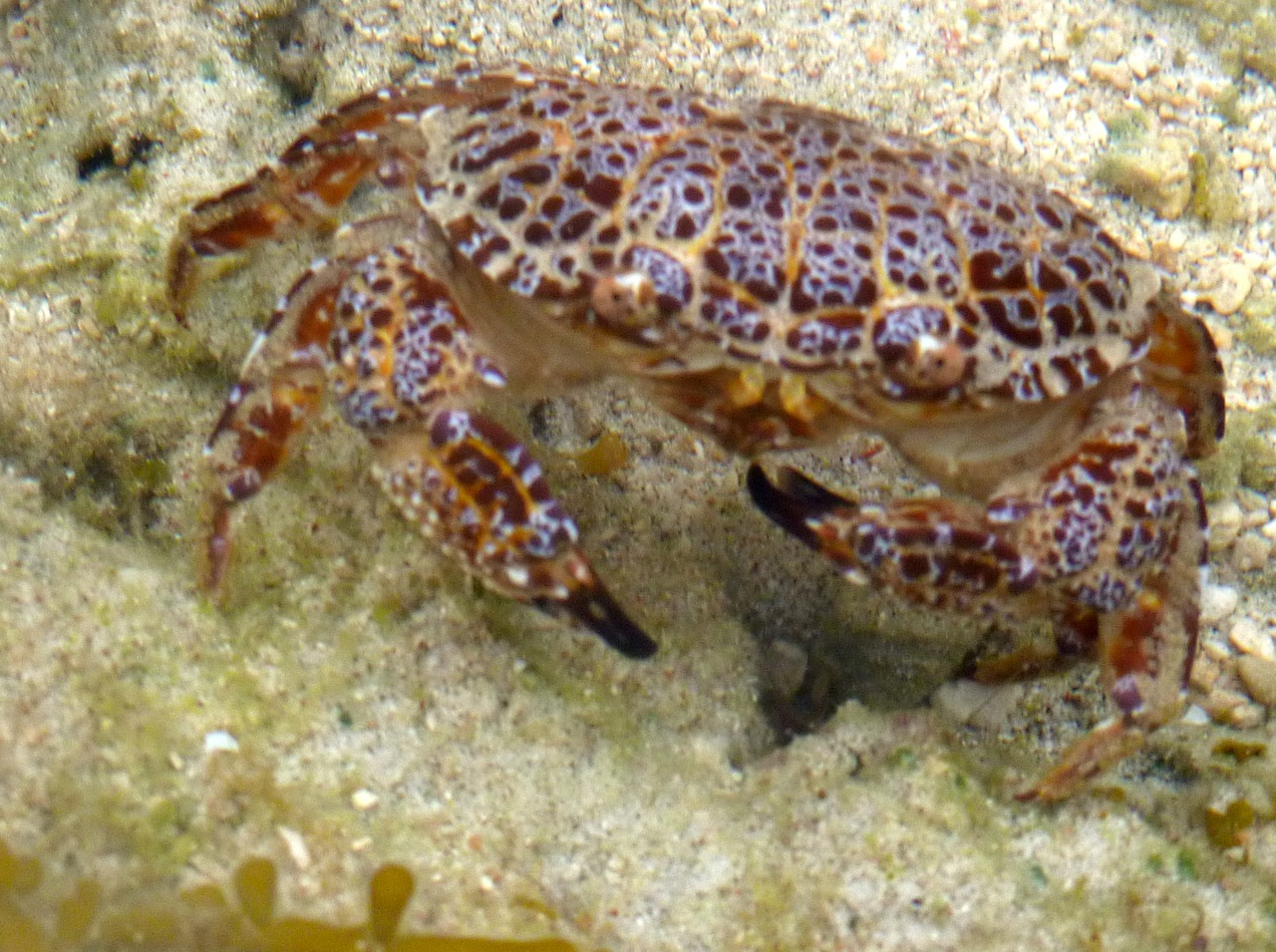
- Zosimus aeneus - An Atauro crab

Scientific classification
- Kingdom: Animalia
- Phylum: Arthropoda
- Class: Malacostraca
- Order: Decapoda
- Suborder: Pleocyemata
- Infraorder: Brachyura
- Family: Xanthidae
- Subfamily: Zosiminae
- Genus: Zosimus; Leach, 1818

Type species
- Cancer aeneus Linnaeus, 1758

= Zosimus (crab) =

Genus of crabs

Zosimus is a genus of crabs in the family Xanthidae, containing the following species:

- Zosimus actaeoides (A. Milne Edwards, 1867)
- Zosimus aeneus (Linnaeus, 1758)
- Zosimus fissa (Henderson, 1893)
- Zosimus hawaiiensis (Rathbun, 1906)
- Zosimus laevis Dana, 1852
- Zosimus maculatus (Linnaeus, 1758)
- Zosimus sculptus (De Man, 1888)

Three species are known from the fossil record, including two which are extinct.
