= Limnochares =

Scientific classification
- Kingdom: Animalia
- Phylum: Arthropoda
- Subphylum: Chelicerata
- Class: Arachnida
- Order: Trombidiformes
- Family: Limnocharidae
- Genus: Limnochares; Latreille, 1796

Genus of mites

Limnochares is a genus of mites in the family Limnocharidae. There are at least two described species in Limnochares.

== Species ==
These two species belong to the genus Limnochares:

- Limnochares americana Lundblad, 1941
- Limnochares aquatica (Linnaeus, 1758)
