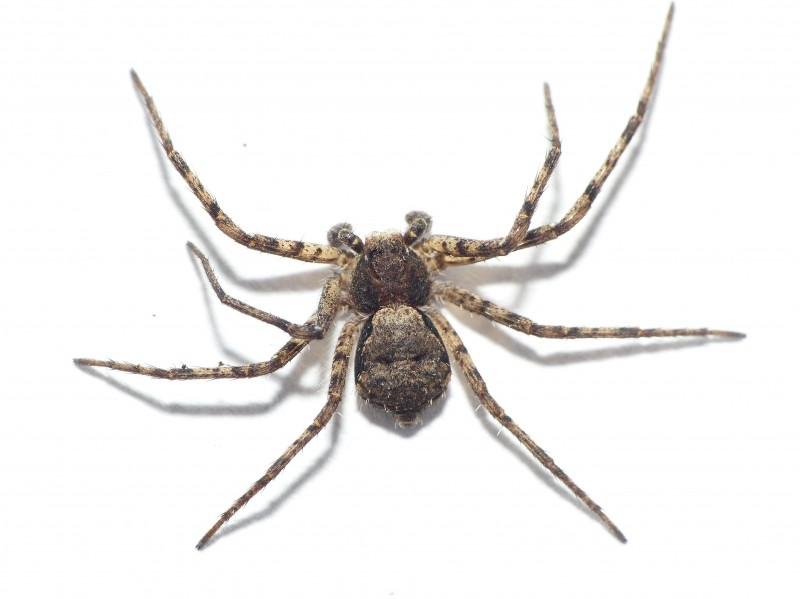
- Philodromus margaritatus (Philodromidae), Wageningen - Regentesselaan, the Netherlands

Scientific classification
- Domain: Eukaryota
- Kingdom: Animalia
- Phylum: Arthropoda
- Subphylum: Chelicerata
- Class: Arachnida
- Order: Araneae
- Infraorder: Araneomorphae
- Family: Philodromidae
- Genus: Philodromus
- Species: P. margaritatus

Binomial name
- Philodromus margaritatus (Clerck, 1757)

Synonyms
- Several, including: Araneus margaritatus Clerck, 1757; Philodromus elegans Canestrini, 1876 (Philodromus elegans Franganillo, 1926 is a nomen dubium)

= Philodromus margaritatus =

Species of spider

Philodromus margaritatus is a species of philodromid crab spiders. It is found in Europe, Turkey, Caucasus, Russia to Kazakhstan, Korea and Japan.

Philodromus margaritatus
