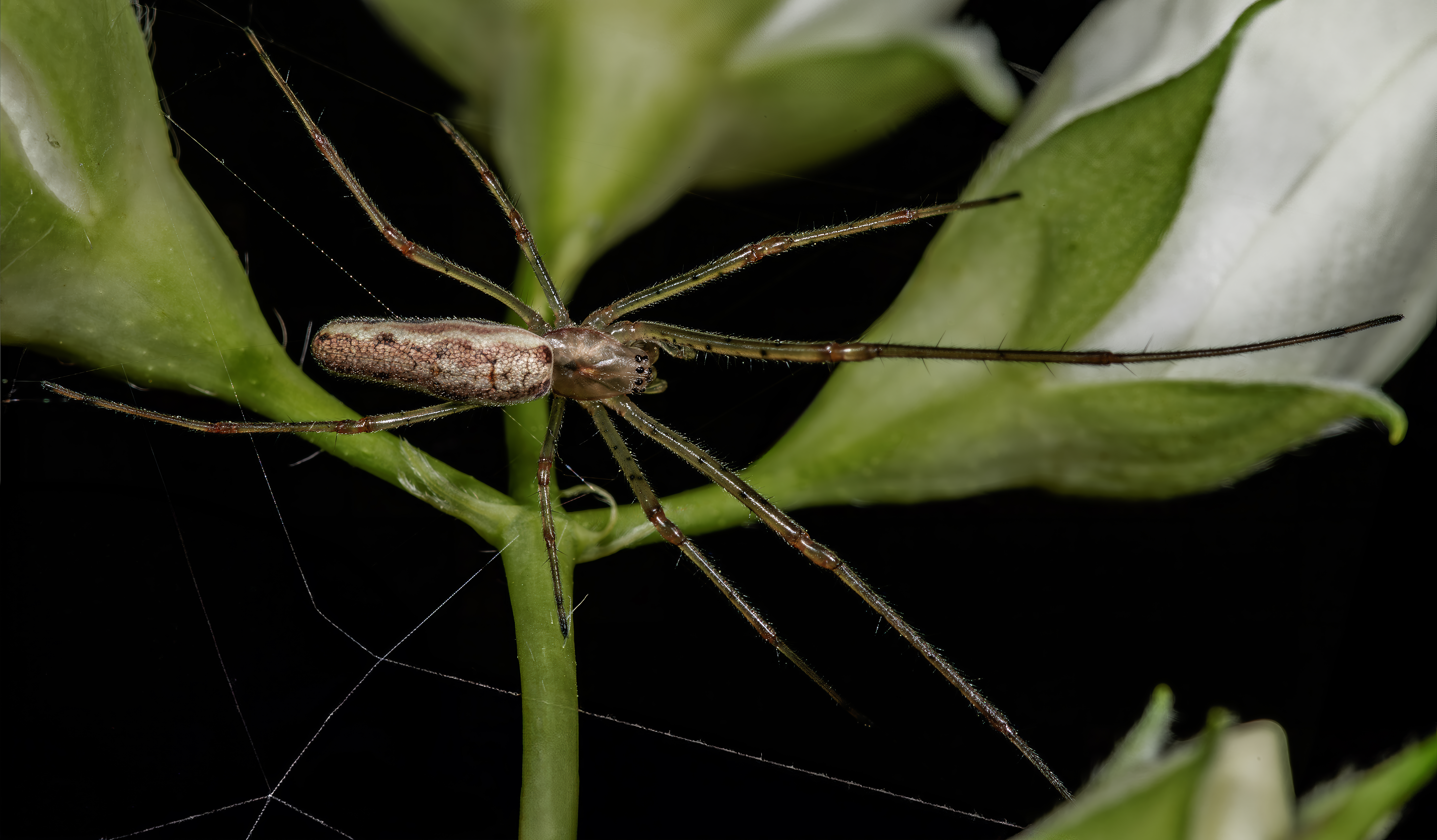
- T. extensa on Philadelphus coronarius

Scientific classification
- Kingdom: Animalia
- Phylum: Arthropoda
- Subphylum: Chelicerata
- Class: Arachnida
- Order: Araneae
- Infraorder: Araneomorphae
- Family: Tetragnathidae
- Genus: Tetragnatha
- Species: T. extensa

Binomial name
- Tetragnatha extensa (Linnaeus, 1758)

Subspecies
- Tetragnatha extensa brachygnatha Thorell, 1873 – Sweden, Russia; Tetragnatha extensa maracandica Charitonov, 1951 – Iran, Russia, Central Asia; Tetragnatha extensa pulchra Kulczynski, 1891 – Hungary

= Tetragnatha extensa =

Species of spider

Tetragnatha extensa is a species of spider found across the Northern Hemisphere. It has an elongate body, up to 11 mm (0.43 in) long, and adopts a straight line posture when alarmed. It lives on low vegetation in damp areas, and feeds on flying insects which it catches in its web.

== Description ==
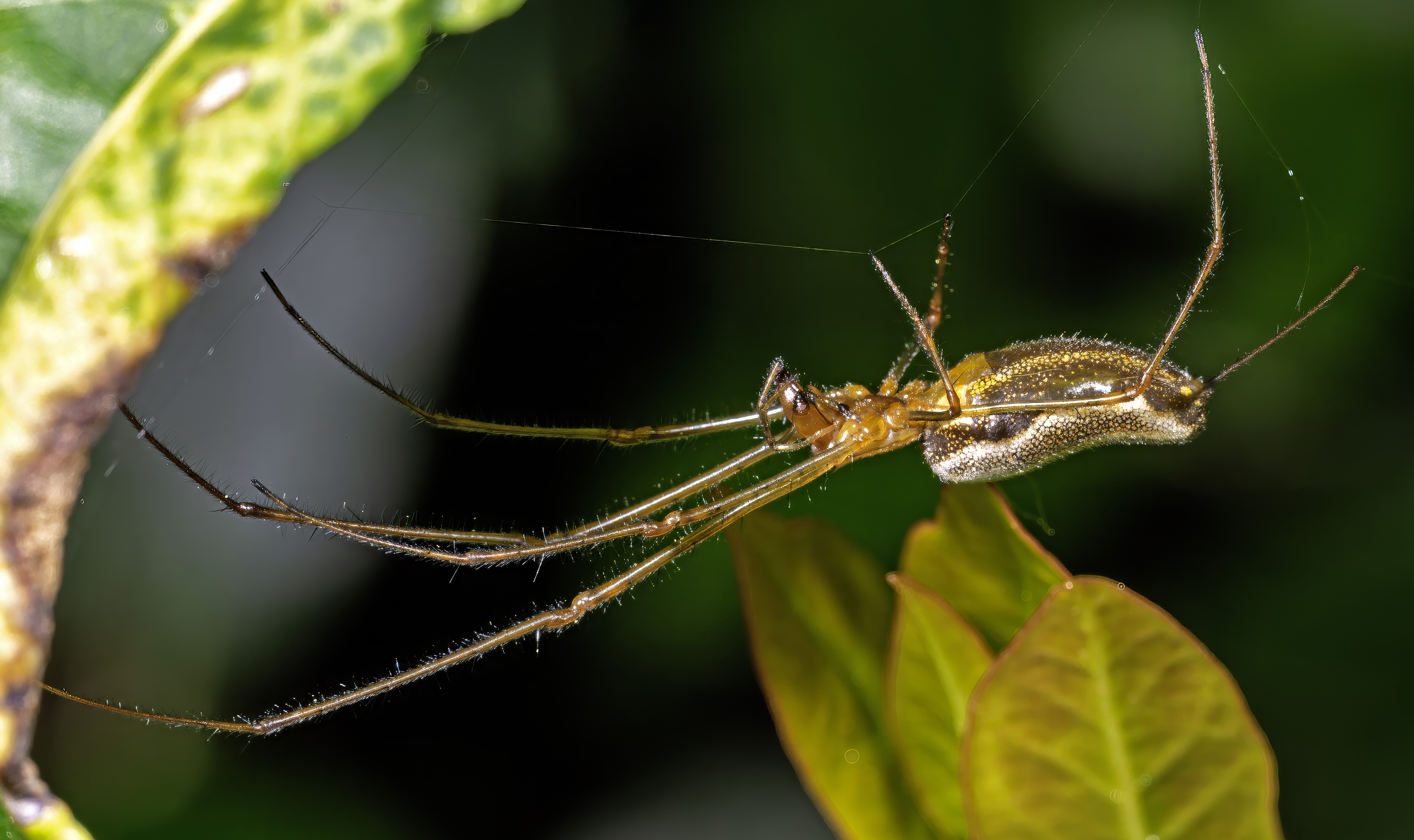
Profile

T. extensa has an elongated, cream-coloured body. Males are smaller than females, at around 9 millimetres (0.35 in) body length, compared to 11 mm (0.43 in) for females. The four pairs of legs are very long, and are dark yellow. The carapace, which is around 1.8–2.6 mm long and 1.1–1.7 mm wide, is orange or dark yellow.

The colouring of T. extensa is quite variable, ranging from creamy-yellow to green. On the underside, there is a thick black central band, with a silvery band on either side.

T. extensa is distinguished from other members of the genus Tetragnatha by the minute curved tip of the male's conductor (part of the pedipalp), and the form of the female's spermatheca.

== Distribution ==
T. extensa has a wide distribution across the Northern Hemisphere (Holarctic).

In North America, it is found from Alaska to Newfoundland, and its range extends south to Washington, Colorado and Pennsylvania. The species has a broad ecological range, having been found at the tree line in the Rocky Mountains.

It is found in coastal vegetation in Europe. T. extensa is found throughout the United Kingdom, where it is the commonest species of Tetragnatha, and one of the commonest spiders. It is also found in Madeira.

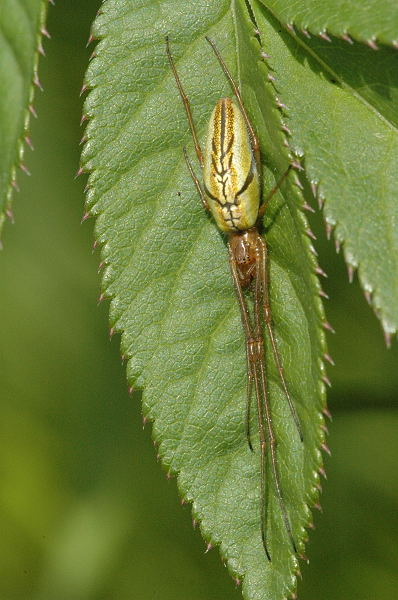
T. extensa in its defensive posture

== Ecology and behaviour ==
Tetragnatha extensa is found on low-growing vegetation, usually in damp areas. It feeds on insects, including mosquitos, midges and moths, which it catches in its loosely constructed web. When alarmed, it will sit along a plant stem, a blade of grass or the central vein of a leaf, with its four front legs pointing forwards, and its four back legs pointing backwards for camouflage. T. extensa is able to walk on the surface of water, where it can move faster than on land.

== Life cycle ==
Adults are seen between May and September in the United Kingdom, and between May and July in Alaska. There is little courtship, and the male and female lock jaws, possibly to prevent the female from eating the male before mating. The egg sacs are globular and covered with grey tufted silk, resembling a bird dropping, and are pressed against a plant stem. Overwintering occurs in the form of early-instar spiderlings.

== Taxonomic history ==
Tetragnatha extensa was first given a binomial by Carl Linnaeus in his Systema Naturae of 1758, the starting point of zoological nomenclature. In that work, it was included in the genus Aranea (now Araneus). T. extensa is a very common, widespread and variable species, and a number of synonyms have been published:

- Aranea extensa Linnaeus, 1758
- Aranea solandri Scopoli, 1763
- Aranea mouffeti Scopoli, 1763
- Tetragnatha rubra Risso, 1826
- Tetragnatha gibba C. L. Koch, 1837
- Tetragnatha chrysochlora Walckenaer, 1841
- Tetragnatha arundinis Bremi-Wolff, 1849
- Tetragnatha fluviatilis Keyserling, 1865
- Tetragnatha nowickii L. Koch, 1870
- Tetragnatha groenlandica Thorell, 1872
- Tetragnatha solandri (Scopoli, 1763)
- Tetragnatha manitoba Chamberlin & Ivie, 1942
- Tetragnatha rusticana Chickering, 1959
- Tetragnatha potanini Schenkel, 1963
- Tetragnatha maderiana Wunderlich, 1987
