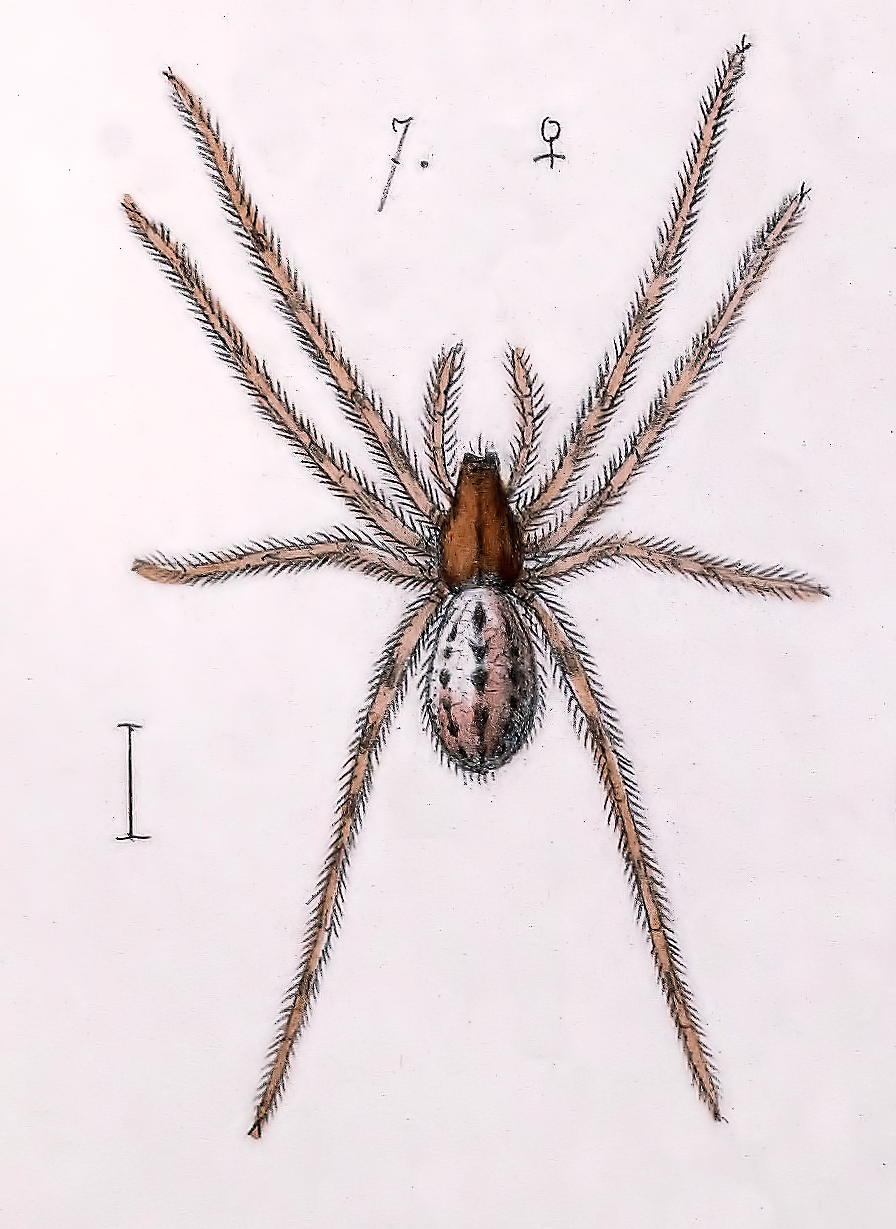
- Female

Scientific classification
- Kingdom: Animalia
- Phylum: Arthropoda
- Subphylum: Chelicerata
- Class: Arachnida
- Order: Araneae
- Infraorder: Araneomorphae
- Family: Linyphiidae
- Genus: Stemonyphantes
- Species: S. lineatus

Binomial name
- Stemonyphantes lineatus (Linnaeus, 1758)

= Stemonyphantes lineatus =

Species of spider

Stemonyphantes lineatus is a species of arachnid in the infraorder Araneomorphae, family Linyphiidae, and genus Stemonyphantes. It was described by Linnaeus in 1758.

It is distributed in Europe, Caucasus, Russia (Europe to Siberia), Kazakhstan, Central Asia, and China The male's body is about 4–5 millimeters long, and the female's is 4.5–7.

== Bibliography ==
- Lawrence Bee, Geoff Oxford, Helen Smith. Britain's Spiders: A Field Guide – Fully Revised and Updated Second Edition. Princeton University Press (2020). pp. 433. ISBN 9780691211800.
