= Spirocyclistus maximus =

Scientific classification
- Kingdom: Animalia
- Phylum: Arthropoda
- Subphylum: Myriapoda
- Class: Diplopoda
- Order: Spirostreptida
- Family: Spirostreptidae
- Genus: Spirocyclistus
- Species: S. maximus

Binomial name
- Spirocyclistus maximus Linnaeus, 1758

Species of millipede

Spirocyclistus maximus is a species of millipede belonging to the family Spirostreptidae.
