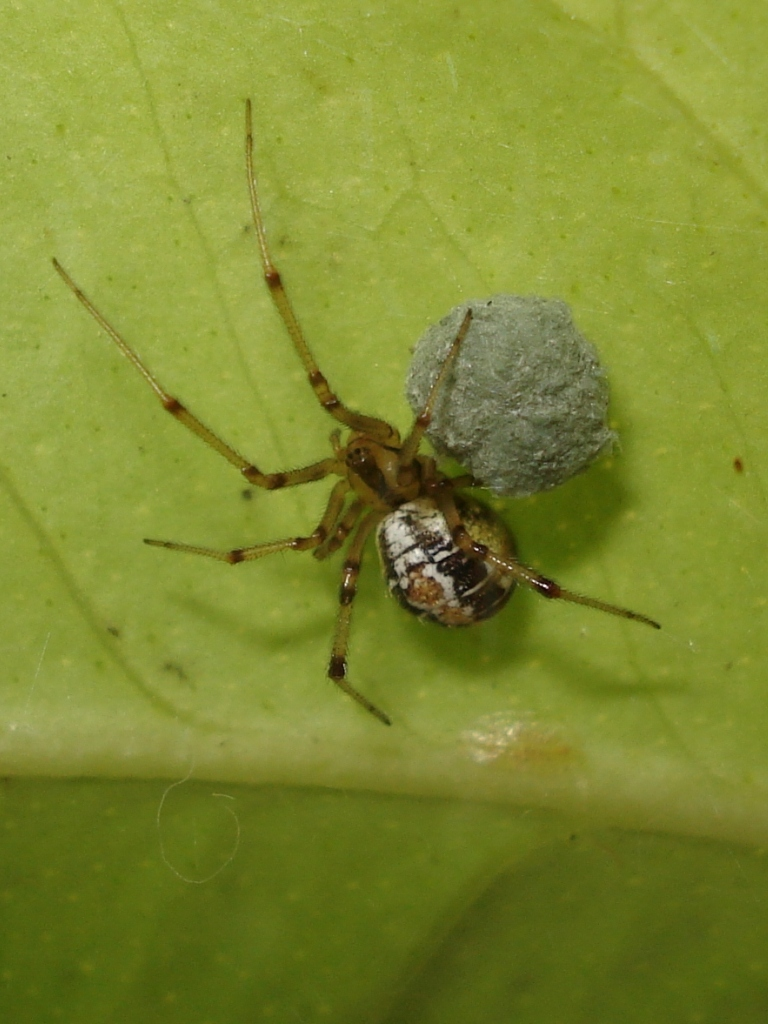

Scientific classification
- Domain: Eukaryota
- Kingdom: Animalia
- Phylum: Arthropoda
- Subphylum: Chelicerata
- Class: Arachnida
- Order: Araneae
- Infraorder: Araneomorphae
- Family: Theridiidae
- Genus: Phylloneta
- Species: P. sisyphia

Binomial name
- Phylloneta sisyphia (Clerck, 1757)

Synonyms
- Araneus sisyphius Clerck, 1757; Aranea notate Linnaeus, 1758; Aranea nervosa Olivier, 1789; Aranea scopulorum Schrank, 1803; Theridion Sisyphus (Clerck, 1757); Theridion sisyphum Hahn, 1834; Theridion nervosum Olivier, 1789; Linyphia cincta Walckenaer, 1841; Steatoda Sisyphus (Clerck, 1757); Zilla alpina Giebel, 1867; Theridion notatum Wiehle, 1937

= Phylloneta sisyphia =

Species of spider

Phylloneta sisyphia, the mothercare spider, is a species of comb-footed spider from the genus Phylloneta.

== Description ==
The female is 2.5-5.5 mm in length, males are 2.5-4.5mm. The prosoma is reddish yellow with a broad, brown-black margin and median stripe. The sternum is reddish yellow, with a dark margin. The chelicerae are reddish yellow and the legs are also reddish yellow with brown rings. The abdomen is yellowish or reddish, with a dorsal dark brown spot pattern. Males and females are similar in colour and pattern.

== Distribution ==
Phylloneta sisyphia has a wide Palaearctic distribution, it is widespread in western and central Europe, it is absent from Iceland. It is very similar to Phylloneta impressa and care needs to be taken in separating the two species.

== Habitat ==
Phylloneta sisyphia is found on shrubs and bushes in sunny areas, up to an altitude of 2300 m. In Britain it is frequently found on heather and gorse bushes on open ground, but may also inhabit oak, blackthorn, nettles, juniper and thistles.

== Biology ==
Phylloneta sisyphia builds a retreat in the shape of an inverted cup, which is covered with plant debris. Underneath the retreat the spider spins the tangle wed typical of the Theridiidae. The adults are found in the early to mid-summer, with the majority of males being found in May and June and that of females in June, but they occasionally persist into October. The single, spherical bluish-green egg-sac is produced in summer, between June and August, which is slightly earlier than Phylloneta impressa, and are retained in the retreat. The emergent juveniles are fed orally by the female, giving rise to the common name, mothercare spider. Initially the food is regurgitated by the mother but as the juveniles grow larger the mother shares larger food items with them. The female will die before the juveniles leave the nest and they will eat her body.

== Subspecies ==
- Phylloneta sisyphia foliifera (Thorell, 1875) Spain
- Phylloneta sisyphia torandae (Strand, 1917) Yarkand, Karakorum
