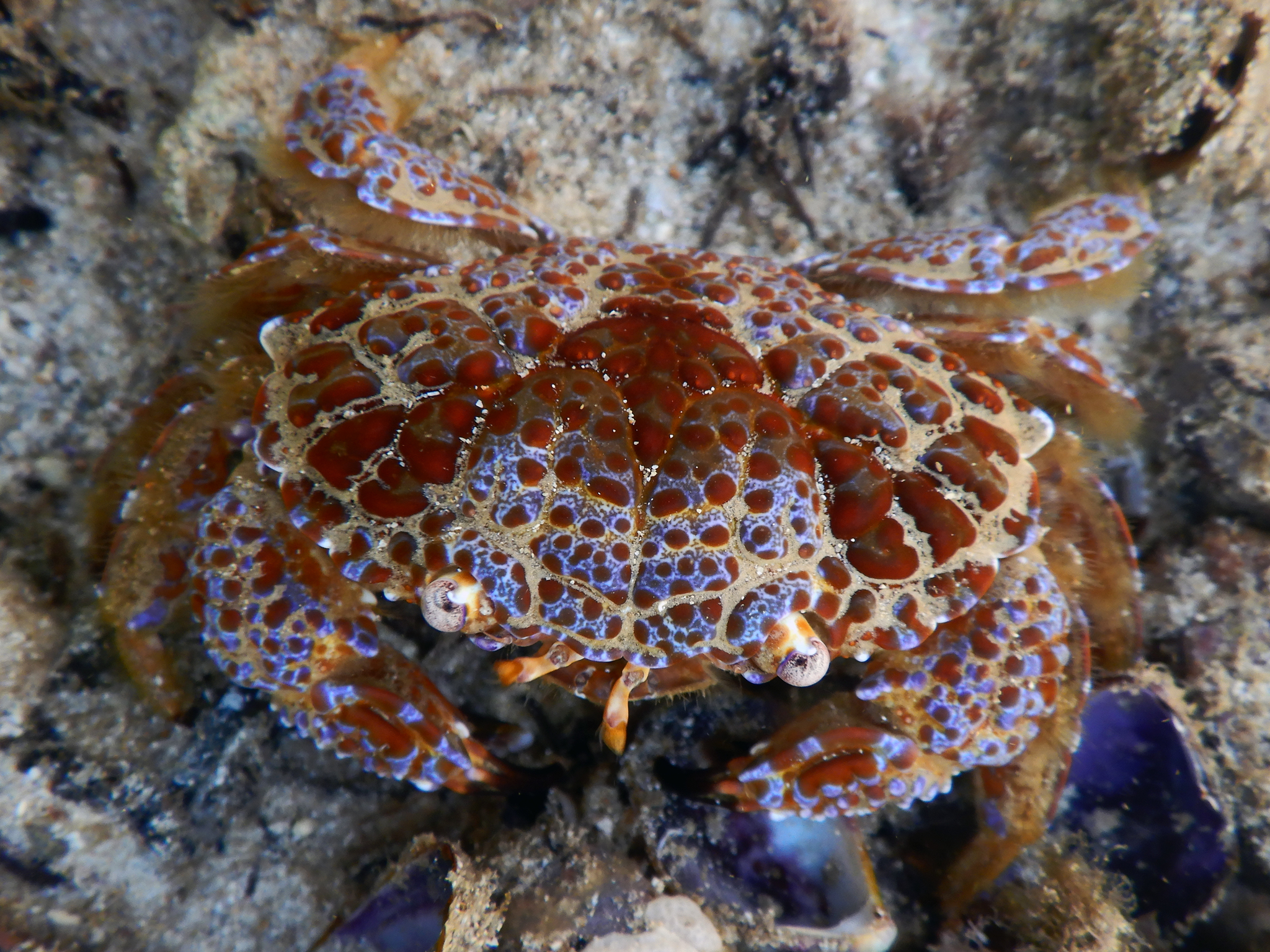
- Zosimus aeneus in Kenya

Scientific classification
- Kingdom: Animalia
- Phylum: Arthropoda
- Clade: Pancrustacea
- Class: Malacostraca
- Order: Decapoda
- Suborder: Pleocyemata
- Infraorder: Brachyura
- Family: Xanthidae
- Genus: Zosimus
- Species: Z. aeneus

Binomial name
- Zosimus aeneus (Linnaeus, 1758)

Synonyms
- List: Cancer aeneus Linnaeus, 1758; Cancer amphitrite Herbst, 1801; Cancer floridus Herbst, 1783; Zozimus aeneus (Linnaeus, 1758); Zozymus aeneus (Linnaeus, 1758)

= Zosimus aeneus =

Species of crab

Zosimus aeneus, also known as the devil crab, toxic reef crab, and devil reef crab, is a species of crab that lives on coral reefs in Indo-Pacific, from East Africa to Hawaii. It grows to a size of about 60 mm × 90 mm (2.4 in × 3.5 in) and has a distinctive pattern of brownish blotches on a paler background. It is potentially lethal due to the presence of neurotoxins tetrodotoxin and saxitoxin in its flesh and shell.

== Taxonomy ==
Zosimus aeneus was first described by Carl Linnaeus in his 1758 10th edition of Systema Naturae. It was transferred to the genus "Zozymus" by James Dwight Dana in 1852, which was replaced with Zosimus by Mary J. Rathbun in 1907. It is the type species of the genus Zosimus.

== Description ==
Zosimus aeneus reaches a size of 60 by 90 millimetres (2.4 in × 3.5 in). It is "a well known brightly coloured and strikingly patterned species": its carapace and legs (including the claws) are marked with a characteristic pattern of red or brown patches on a pale brown or cream background. The carapace is deeply grooved, and the walking legs have prominent crests.

== Distribution and habitat ==
Zosimus aeneus is found across a large part of the Indo-Pacific, from South Africa to the Red Sea, and as far east as Japan, Australia and Hawaii.

It lives on reef flats in the intertidal zone.

== Toxicity ==
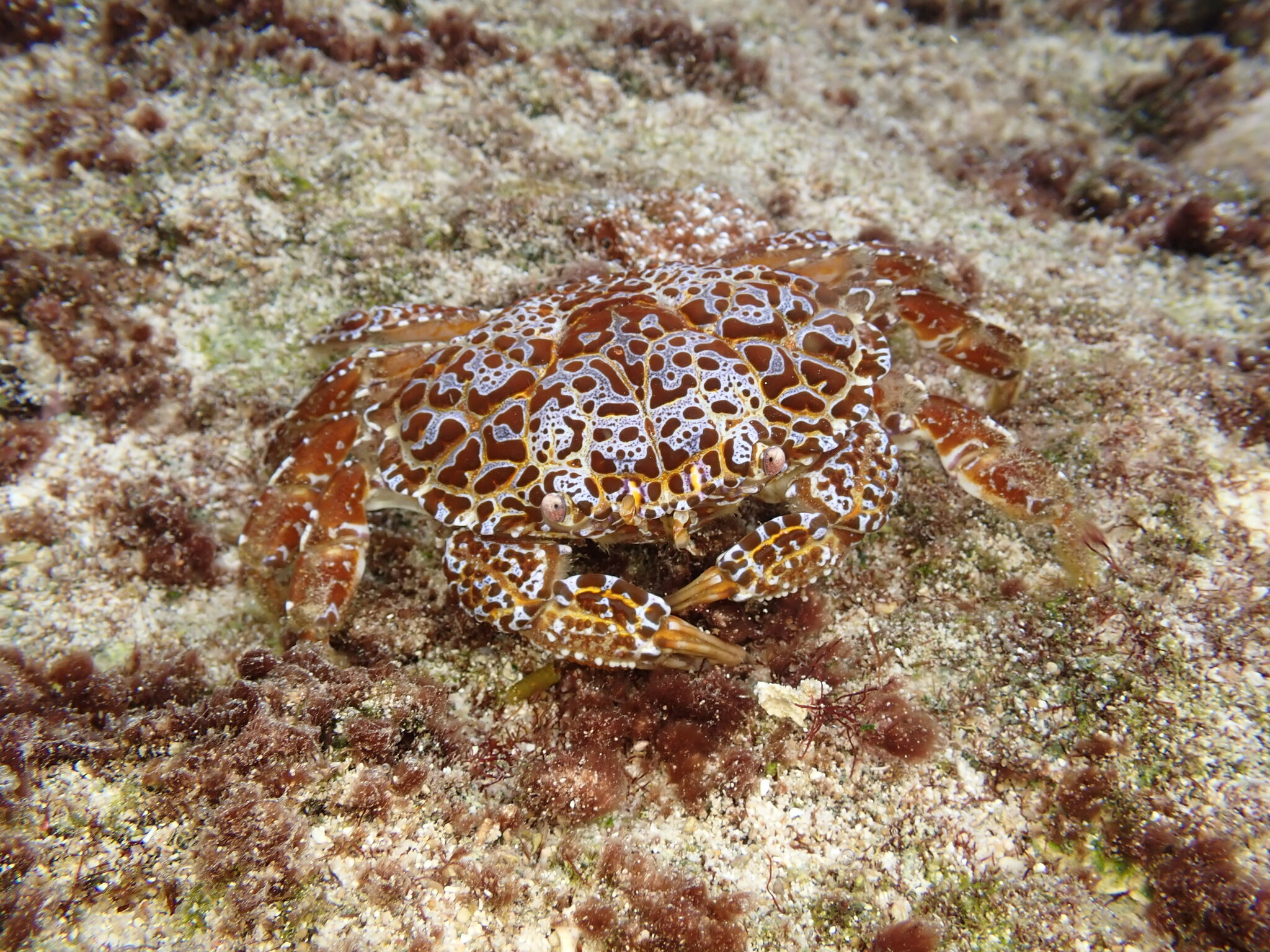
In Guam

Both the shell and the meat of Zosimus aeneus contain significant concentrations of neurotoxins including tetrodotoxin and saxitoxin. Tetrodotoxin (TTX) is the compound responsible for the toxicity of puffer fish, while saxitoxin (SXN) is the best known of several related neurotoxins that cause paralytic shellfish poisoning (PSP). Both are absorbed through the gastrointestinal tract and interfere with sodium channels in the membranes of nerve cells.

Poisoning with Z. aeneus can be fatal; one man in Timor-Leste died hours after consuming the crab, having received a dose equivalent to 1–2 μg saxitoxin per kilogram body mass. The flesh of Z. aeneus is reported to be ingested by inhabitants of the Pacific Islands with the intention of committing suicide.

Z. aeneus is considered the most poisonous crab in the Philippines, with 50% of intoxication cases being fatal. Studies determined that individual specimens contained in excess of 3000 MU/g of saxitoxin, a lethal amount for humans that resulted in 12 fatalities in Negros Island in the 1980s. In February 2021, two children in Cagayan died after eating Z. aeneus caught by their father. In February 2026, a food vlogger in Palawan died after feasting on several Z. aeneus for her social media channel.

== Gallery ==
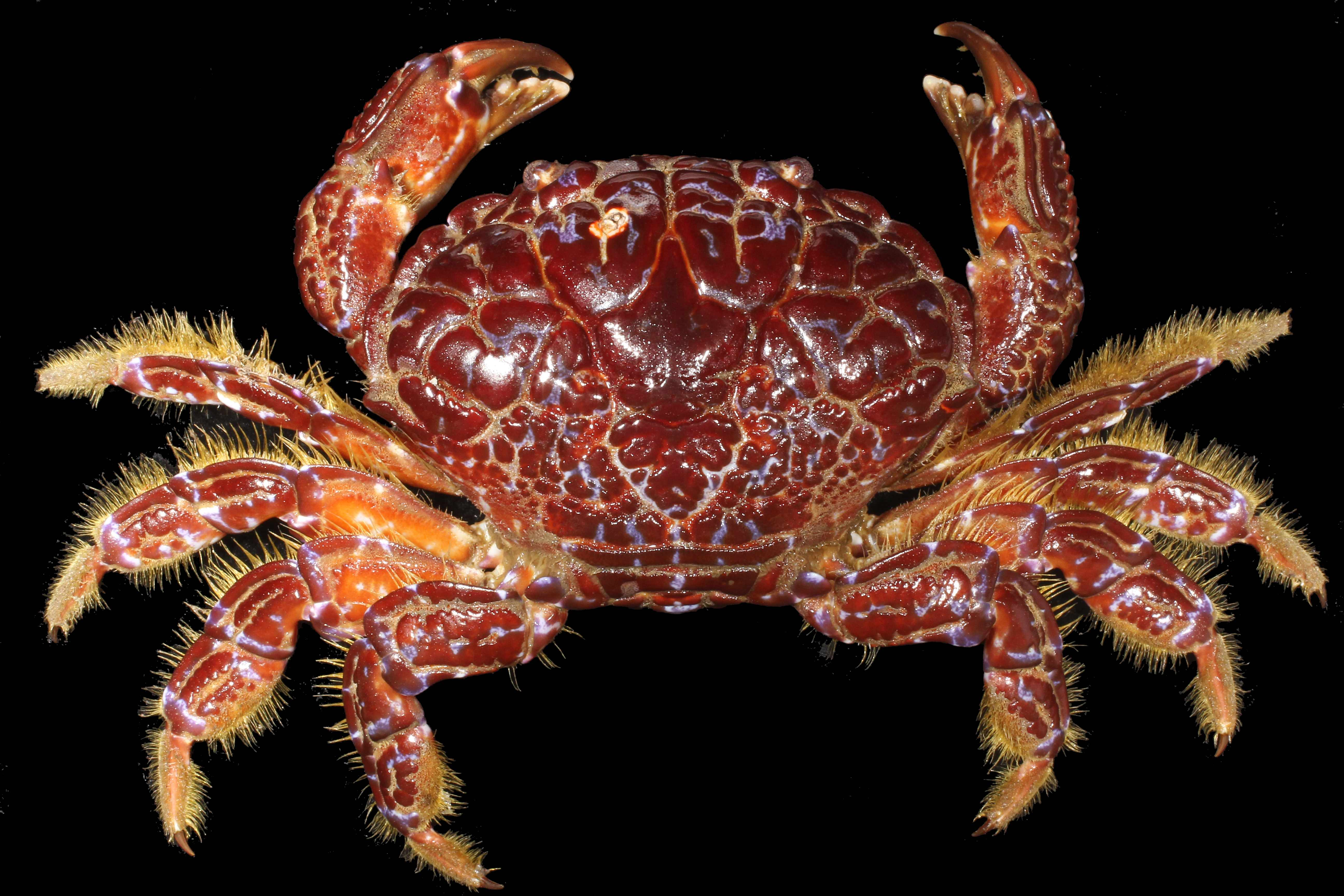

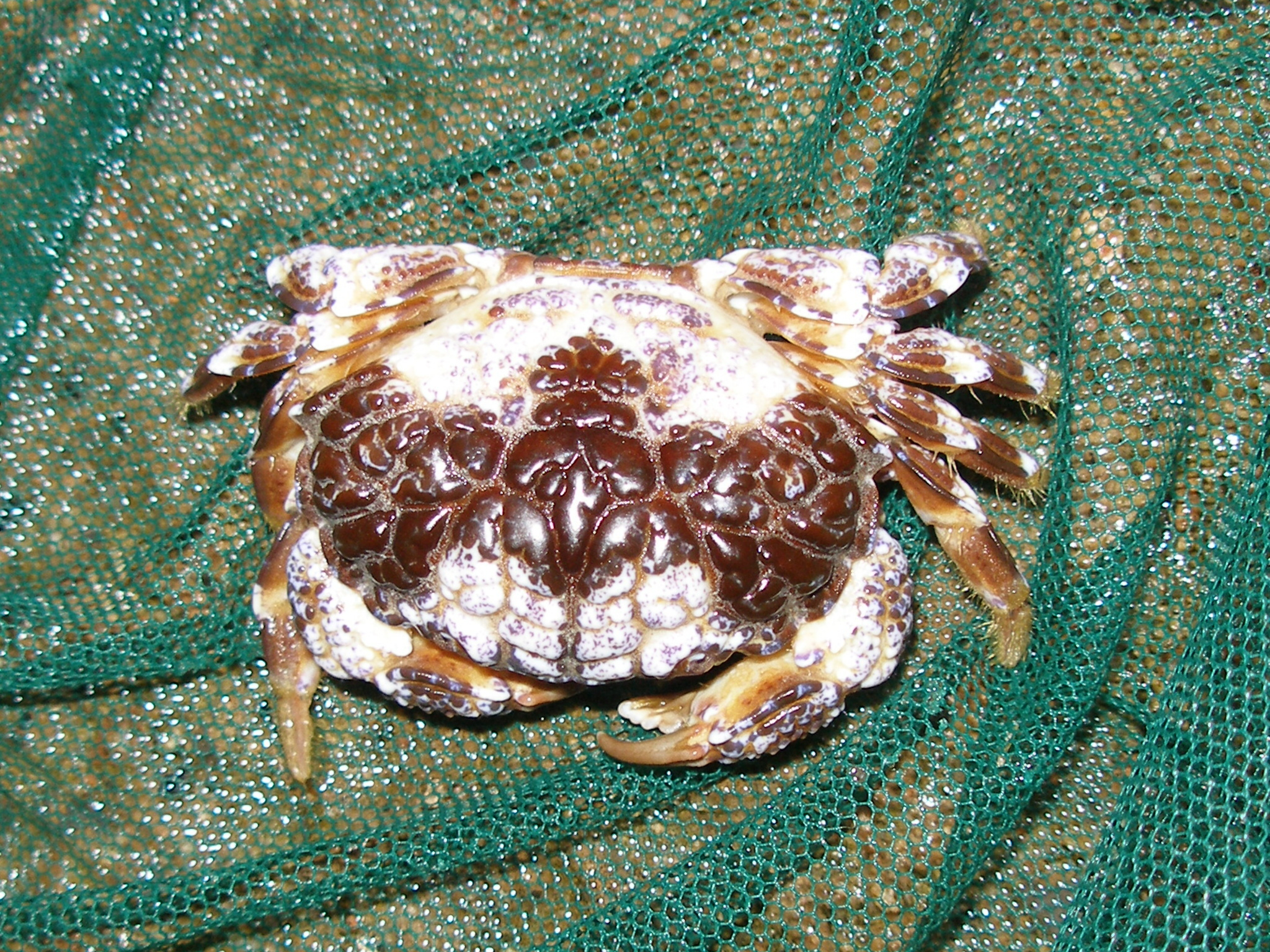

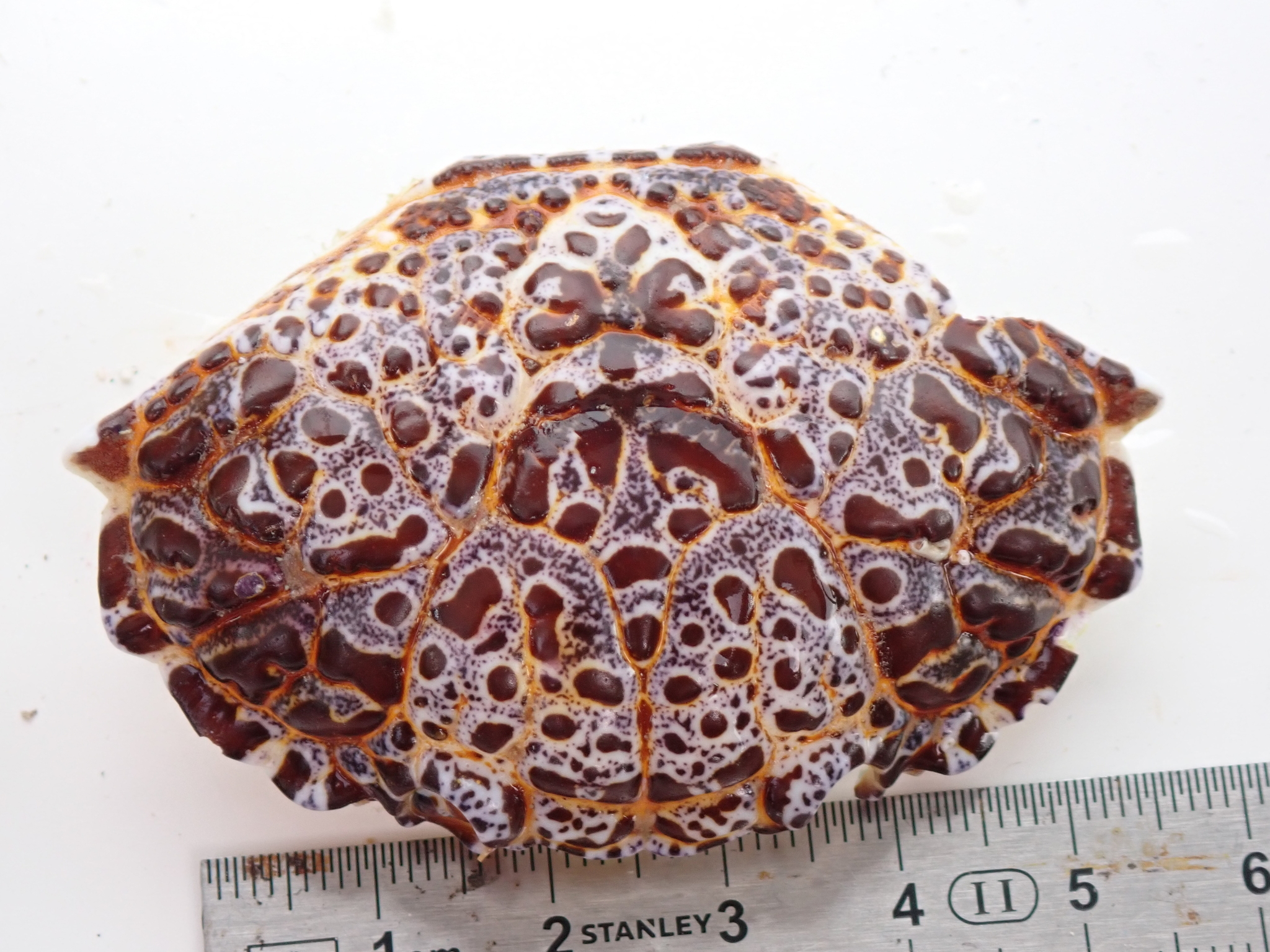

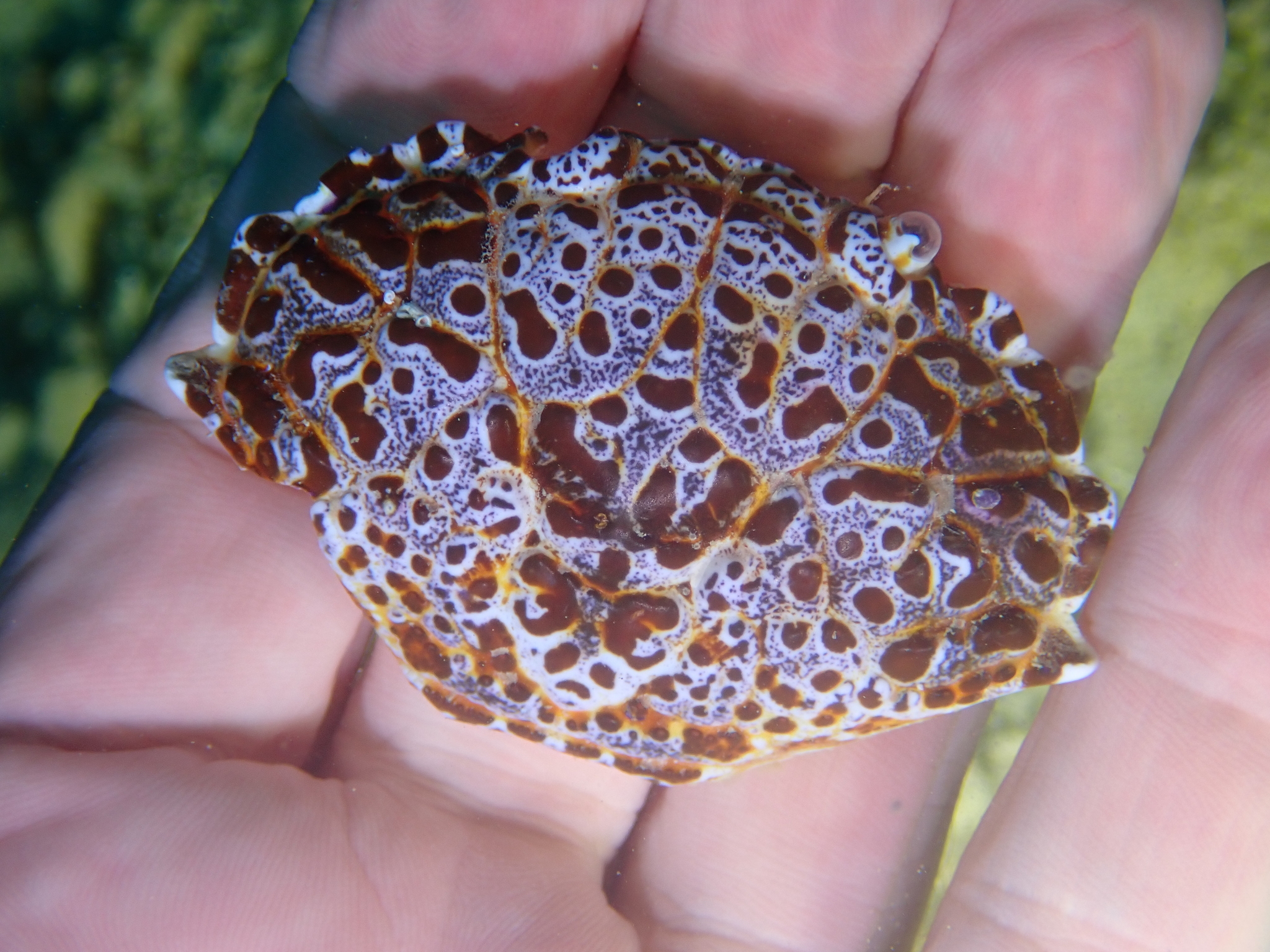

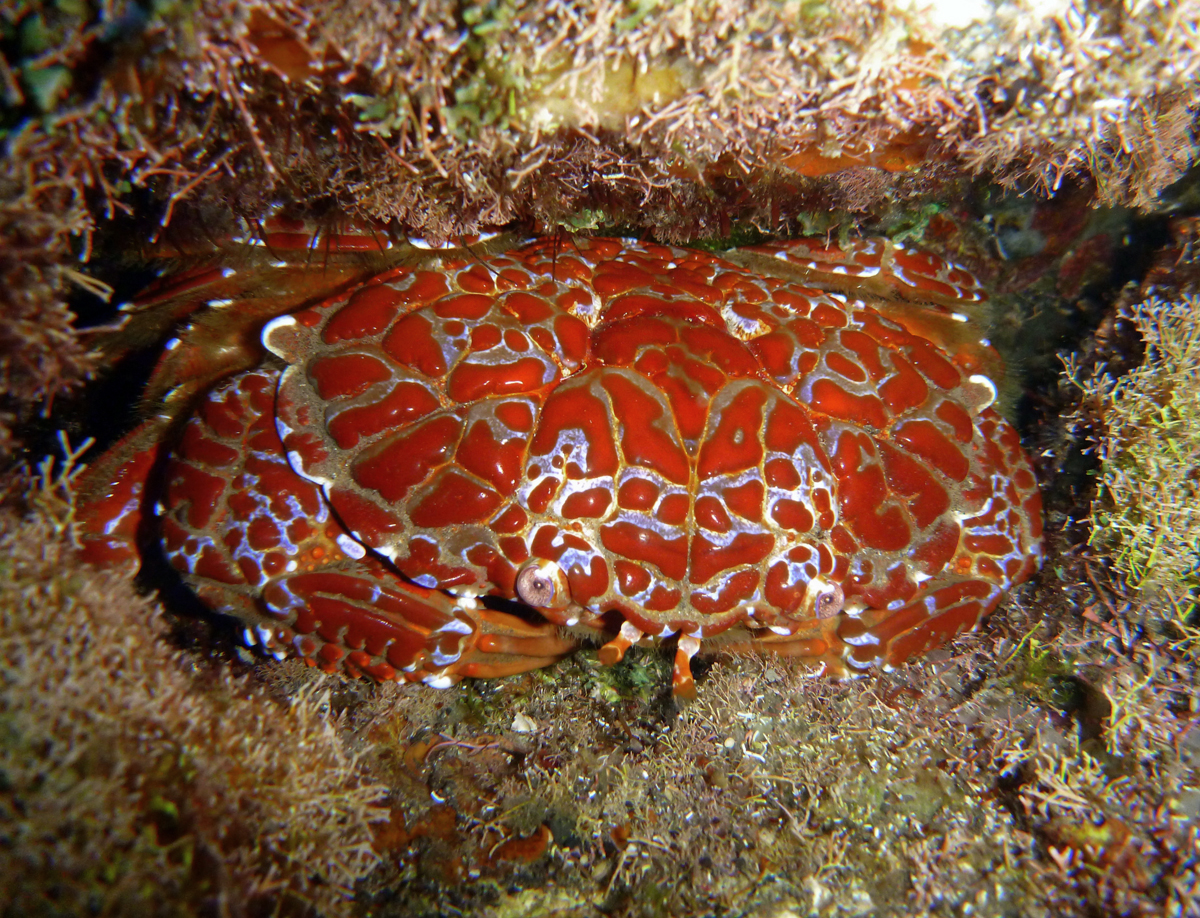
