= Limnocharidae =

Scientific classification
- Kingdom: Animalia
- Phylum: Arthropoda
- Subphylum: Chelicerata
- Class: Arachnida
- Order: Trombidiformes
- Suborder: Prostigmata
- Superfamily: Eylaoidea
- Family: Limnocharidae

Family of mites

Limnocharidae is a family of mites in the order Trombidiformes. There are at least 4 genera and about 12 described species in Limnocharidae.

== Genera ==
These four genera belong to the family Limnocharidae:

- Austrolimnochares Harvey, 1998
- Limnochares Latreille, 1796
- Rhyncholimnochares Lundblad, 1936
- † Neolimnochares Lundblad, 1937
