= Anomalus =

Anomalus may refer to:

- Afrotyphlops anomalus, commonly known as the Angolan giant blind snake
- Alastor anomalus, a species of wasp
- Allomyces anomalus, a species of fungus
- Bannereus anomalus, a species of shrimp
- Brettanomyces anomalus, a species of yeast
- Bromus anomalus, commonly known as nodding brome, a species of flowering plant
- Cortinarius anomalus, also known as the variable webcap, a species of fungus
- Devario anomalus, a freshwater fish
- Drepanoides anomalus, a species of snake
- Eleothreptus anomalus, or Sickle-winged nightjar
- Galaxias anomalus, or Roundhead galaxias, a galaxiid of the genus Galaxias
- Gymnopilus anomalus, a species of mushroom
- Haitiophis anomalus, or Hispaniola racer, a species of snake
- Heteromys anomalus, or Trinidad spiny pocket mouse
- Holcosus anomalus, or Echternacht's ameiva, a species of teiid lizard
- Ingensia anomalus, a species of sea snail
- Neomys anomalus, or Mediterranean water shrew
- Philodromus anomalus, a species of spider
- Pholidobolus anomalus, a species of lizard
- Raukaua anomalus, a species of shrub
- Sciurus anomalus, or Caucasian squirrel
- Thalassophis anomalus, a species of sea snake
- Tmesisternus anomalus, a species of beetle
- Verilus anomalus, a three-spined cardinalfish, a species of fish
- Zosterops anomalus, or Black-ringed white-eye, a species of birds

== See also ==
- Anomalous monism, a philosophical thesis about the mind–body relationship
