= A. kochi =

A. kochi may refer to:

- Abacetus kochi, a ground beetle
- Alastor kochi, a wasp
- Alopecosa kochi, a wolf spider found in North America
- Amaurobius kochi, a synonym of Titanoeca quadriguttata, a spider found in Europe
- Anguispira kochi, the banded tigersnail, found in North America
- Anomalosa kochi, a wolf spider found in Australia
