= A. asiaticus =

A. asiaticus may refer to:

- Acartauchenius asiaticus, a money spider species in the genus Acartauchenius
- Aduncothrips asiaticus, a thrip species in the family Aeolothripidae
- Aesalus asiaticus, a beetle species in the genus Aesalus; see Taxonomy of Lucanidae § Subfamily Aesalinae
- Alastor asiaticus, a wasp species in the genus Alastor
- Araneus asiaticus, an orb-weaver spider species
- Archaeornithomimus asiaticus, a dinosaur species
- Asiabadus asiaticus, a ground spider species in the genus Asiabadus

== See also ==
- Asiaticus (disambiguation)
