= Alopecosa ovalis =

Scientific classification
- Domain: Eukaryota
- Kingdom: Animalia
- Phylum: Arthropoda
- Subphylum: Chelicerata
- Class: Arachnida
- Order: Araneae
- Infraorder: Araneomorphae
- Family: Lycosidae
- Genus: Alopecosa
- Species: A. ovalis

Binomial name
- Alopecosa ovalis Chen, Song & Gao, 2000

Species of spider

Alopecosa ovalis is a species of wolf spider found in Inner Mongolia in the People's Republic of China. The female has a length (excluding legs) of up to 9 mm, the male being rather smaller at about 8 mm. The female has a wide reddish-brown longitudinal band on the back of the carapace with a yellowish band along the back of the abdomen. The legs are faintly ringed. The male is similar but is generally much hairier and with dark legs with no trace of ringing.

This species, as well as A. huabanna, which was described in the same paper, are similar to A. hokkaidensis and A. moriutii from Japan and A. hingganica from Inner Mongolia, and A. pictilis from the northern Holarctic.

The species name refers to the oval shape of the median septum of the epigyne.
