= Alastor darius =

Scientific classification
- Kingdom: Animalia
- Phylum: Arthropoda
- Clade: Pancrustacea
- Class: Insecta
- Order: Hymenoptera
- Family: Vespidae
- Genus: Alastor
- Species: A. darius

Binomial name
- Alastor darius Gusenleitner, 1986

Species of wasp

Alastor darius is a species of wasp in the family Vespidae. (Note: "Alastor darius". BioLib.cz. Archived from the original on 2022-06-01.)
