= Alopecosa beckeri =

Scientific classification
- Kingdom: Animalia
- Phylum: Arthropoda
- Subphylum: Chelicerata
- Class: Arachnida
- Order: Araneae
- Infraorder: Araneomorphae
- Family: Lycosidae
- Genus: Alopecosa
- Species: A. beckeri

Binomial name
- Alopecosa beckeri (Thorell, 1875)

Species of spider

Alopecosa beckeri is a species of wolf spider found in Ukraine and south European Russia
