= Alastor sulcifer =

Scientific classification
- Kingdom: Animalia
- Phylum: Arthropoda
- Class: Insecta
- Order: Hymenoptera
- Family: Vespidae
- Genus: Alastor
- Species: A. sulcifer

Binomial name
- Alastor sulcifer Giordani Soika, 1934

Species of wasp

Alastor sulcifer is a species of wasp in the family Vespidae.
