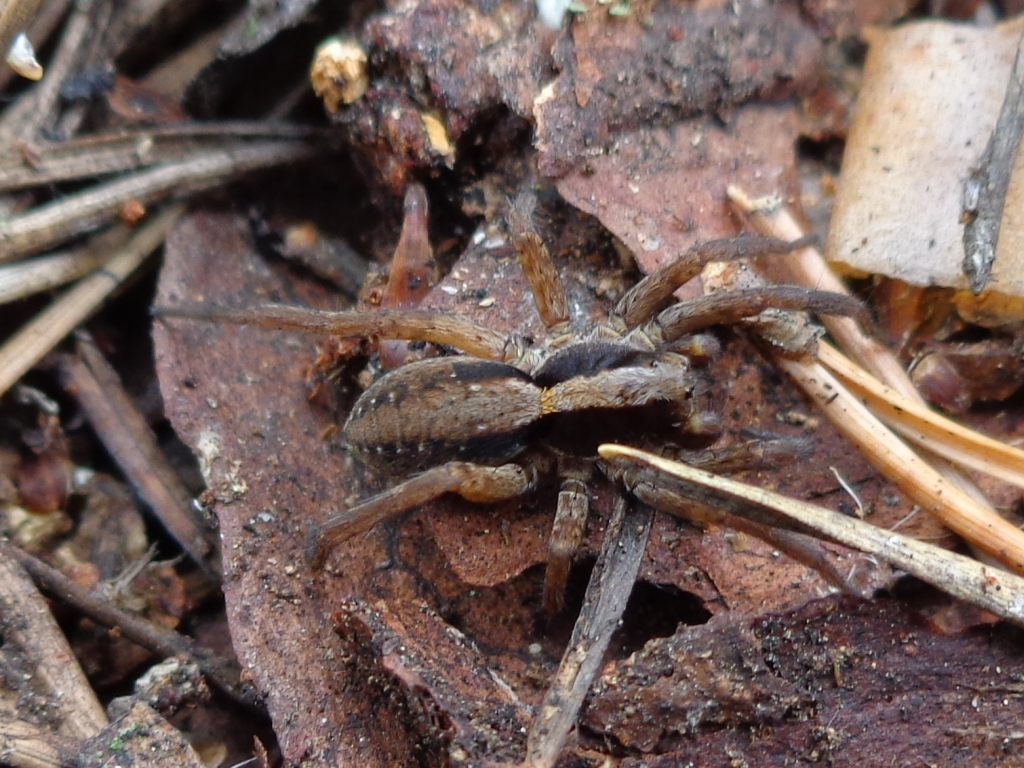

Conservation status
- Secure (NatureServe)

Scientific classification
- Kingdom: Animalia
- Phylum: Arthropoda
- Subphylum: Chelicerata
- Class: Arachnida
- Order: Araneae
- Infraorder: Araneomorphae
- Family: Lycosidae
- Genus: Alopecosa
- Species: A. aculeata

Binomial name
- Alopecosa aculeata (Clerck, 1757)

= Alopecosa aculeata =

Species of spider

Alopecosa aculeata is a species of wolf spider in the family Lycosidae. It is found in North America, Europe, Turkey, the Caucasus, Russia (European to Far East), Central Asia, China, and Japan.
