= Alastor nitens =

Scientific classification
- Kingdom: Animalia
- Phylum: Arthropoda
- Clade: Pancrustacea
- Class: Insecta
- Order: Hymenoptera
- Family: Vespidae
- Genus: Alastor
- Species: A. nitens

Binomial name
- Alastor nitens Gusenleitner, 2000

Species of wasp

Alastor nitens is a species of wasp belonging to the family Vespidae, subfamily Eumeninae (commonly known as potter wasps).
