= Alastor xerxes =

Scientific classification
- Kingdom: Animalia
- Phylum: Arthropoda
- Clade: Pancrustacea
- Class: Insecta
- Order: Hymenoptera
- Family: Vespidae
- Genus: Alastor
- Species: A. xerxes

Binomial name
- Alastor xerxes Gusenleitner, 1986

Species of wasp

Alastor xerxes is a species of wasp in the family Vespidae found in the Hormozgan province of Iran.
