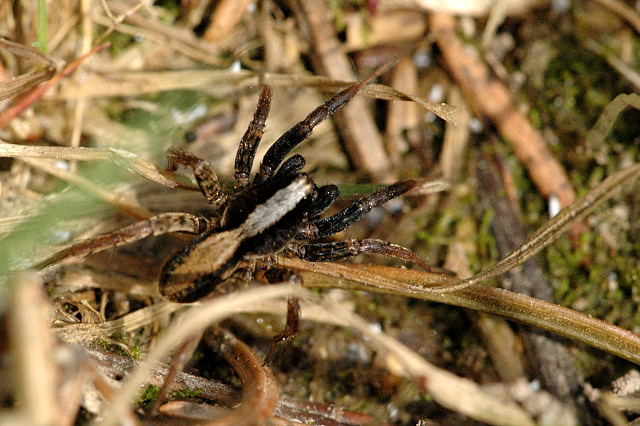
- Male Alopecosa.pulverulenta.

Scientific classification
- Kingdom: Animalia
- Phylum: Arthropoda
- Subphylum: Chelicerata
- Class: Arachnida
- Order: Araneae
- Infraorder: Araneomorphae
- Family: Lycosidae
- Genus: Alopecosa
- Species: A. pulverulenta

Binomial name
- Alopecosa pulverulenta (Clerck, 1757)

Subspecies
- Alopecosa pulverulenta tridentina (Thorell, 1875) — Austria

Synonyms
- Lycosa graminicola Walckenaer, 1826; Lycosa gasteinensis C. L. Koch, 1834; Lycosa rapax Blackwall, 1841; Lycosa renidens Simon, 1876; Pardosa cornuta S. Saito, 1939; Tarentula aquilonaris Fox, 1940; Tarentula pulverulenta — Zimmermann, 1871; Alopecosa pulverulenta — Caporiacco, 1948

= Alopecosa pulverulenta =

Species of spider

Alopecosa is a species of wolf spiders in the genus Alopecosa with a palearctic distribution.

It was described in chapter 5 of the book Svenska Spindlar of the Swedish arachnologist and entomologist Carl Alexander Clerck.

== See also ==
- Biota of the Isle of Man
