= Alastor promontorii =

Scientific classification
- Kingdom: Animalia
- Phylum: Arthropoda
- Class: Insecta
- Order: Hymenoptera
- Family: Vespidae
- Genus: Alastor
- Species: A. promontorii

Binomial name
- Alastor promontorii Meade-Waldo 1913

Species of wasp

Alastor promontorii is a species of wasp in the family Vespidae.
