= Alopecosa solitaria =

Scientific classification
- Kingdom: Animalia
- Phylum: Arthropoda
- Subphylum: Chelicerata
- Class: Arachnida
- Order: Araneae
- Infraorder: Araneomorphae
- Family: Lycosidae
- Genus: Alopecosa
- Species: A. solitaria

Binomial name
- Alopecosa solitaria (Herman, 1879)

Synonyms
- Tarentula solitaria Herman, 1879; Lycosa thessala Simon, 1885; Tarentula teschleri Kolosváry, 1934; Alopecosa solitaria Lugetti & Tongiorgi, 1969

Species of spider

Alopecosa solitaria is a wolf spider species in the genus Alopecosa found in Europe, Russia, and Kazakhstan.
