= Alastor bispinosus =

Scientific classification
- Kingdom: Animalia
- Phylum: Arthropoda
- Class: Insecta
- Order: Hymenoptera
- Family: Vespidae
- Genus: Alastor
- Species: A. bispinosus

Binomial name
- Alastor bispinosus Giordani Soika 1983

Species of wasp

Alastor bispinosus is a species of wasp in the family Vespidae.
