= Alopecosa exasperans =

Conservation status
- Secure (NatureServe)

Scientific classification
- Kingdom: Animalia
- Phylum: Arthropoda
- Subphylum: Chelicerata
- Class: Arachnida
- Order: Araneae
- Infraorder: Araneomorphae
- Family: Lycosidae
- Genus: Alopecosa
- Species: A. exasperans

Binomial name
- Alopecosa exasperans (O. P.-Cambridge, 1877)

Species of spider

Alopecosa exasperans is a species of wolf spider in the family Lycosidae. It is found in Canada and Greenland.
