= Acartauchenius =

Scientific classification
- Kingdom: Animalia
- Phylum: Arthropoda
- Subphylum: Chelicerata
- Class: Arachnida
- Order: Araneae
- Infraorder: Araneomorphae
- Family: Linyphiidae
- Genus: Acartauchenius; Simon, 1884

Type species
- A. scurrilis (O. Pickard-Cambridge, 1873)

Species
- 17, see text

Synonyms
- Trachelocamptus Simon, 1884

Genus of spiders

Acartauchenius is a genus of dwarf spiders that was first described by Eugène Louis Simon in 1884.

== Species ==
As of May 2019 it contains seventeen species:

- Acartauchenius asiaticus (Tanasevitch, 1989) – Turkmenistan
- Acartauchenius bedeli (Simon, 1884) – Algeria
- Acartauchenius derisor (Simon, 1918) – France
- Acartauchenius desertus (Tanasevitch, 1993) – Kazakhstan
- Acartauchenius hamulifer (Denis, 1937) – Algeria
- Acartauchenius himalayensis Tanasevitch, 2011 – Pakistan
- Acartauchenius insigniceps (Simon, 1894) – Morocco, Algeria, Tunisia
- Acartauchenius leprieuri (O. Pickard-Cambridge, 1875) – Algeria
- Acartauchenius minor (Millidge, 1979) – Italy
- Acartauchenius monoceros (Tanasevitch, 1989) – Uzbekistan
- Acartauchenius mutabilis (Denis, 1967) – Morocco, Algeria, Tunisia
- Acartauchenius orientalis Wunderlich, 1995 – Mongolia
- Acartauchenius planiceps Bosmans, 2002 – Algeria
- Acartauchenius praeceps Bosmans, 2002 – Algeria
- Acartauchenius sardiniensis Wunderlich, 1995 – Sardinia
- Acartauchenius scurrilis (O. Pickard-Cambridge, 1873) (type) – Europe, Turkey, Russia (Europe to South Siberia), Central Asia
- Acartauchenius simoni Bosmans, 2002 – Algeria
