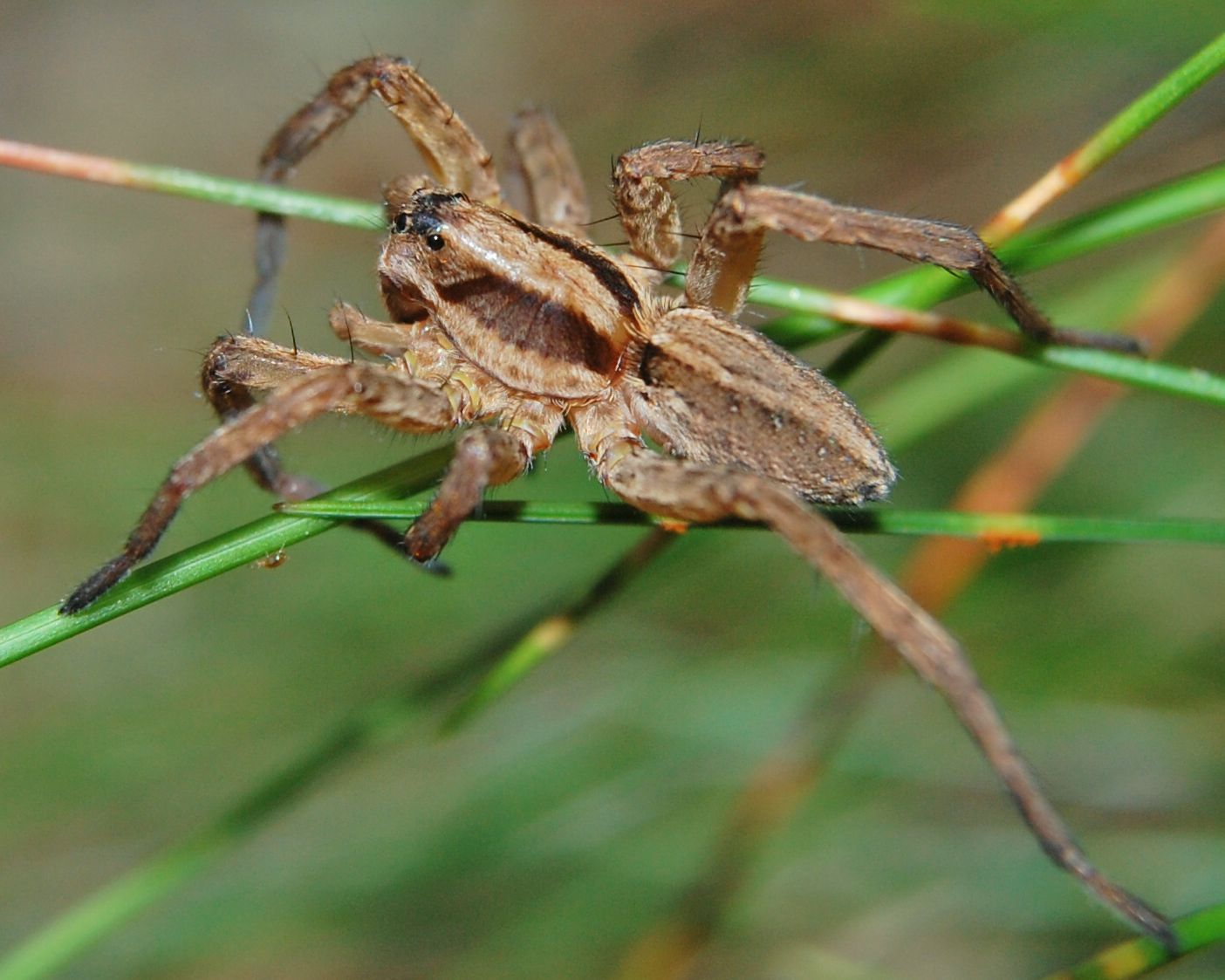

Scientific classification
- Kingdom: Animalia
- Phylum: Arthropoda
- Subphylum: Chelicerata
- Class: Arachnida
- Order: Araneae
- Infraorder: Araneomorphae
- Family: Lycosidae
- Genus: Alopecosa
- Species: A. trabalis

Binomial name
- Alopecosa trabalis (Clerck, 1757)

Subspecies
- Alopecosa trabalis albica (Franganillo, 1913) — Spain

= Alopecosa trabalis =

Species of spider

Alopecosa trabalis is a species of wolf spiders in the genus Alopecosa found in "Europe to Central Asia".

This species was described in 1757 in Chapter 5 of the book Svenska Spindlar by Carl Alexander Clerck.
