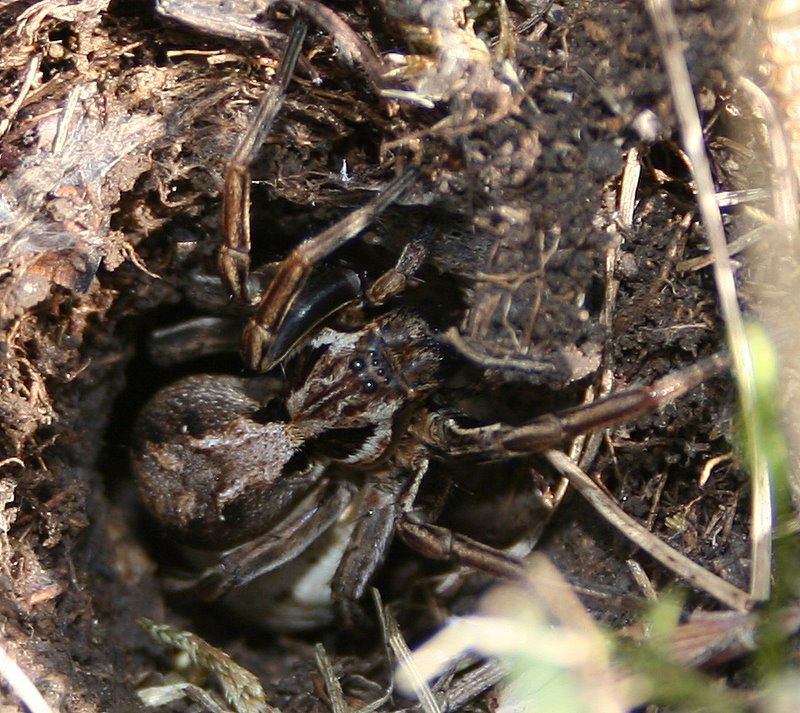
- Alopecosa striatipes, April 2007, Altmühltal, Bayern, Germany

Scientific classification
- Kingdom: Animalia
- Phylum: Arthropoda
- Subphylum: Chelicerata
- Class: Arachnida
- Order: Araneae
- Infraorder: Araneomorphae
- Family: Lycosidae
- Genus: Alopecosa
- Species: A. striatipes

Binomial name
- Alopecosa striatipes (C. L. Koch, 1839)

Synonyms
- Lycosa striatipes C. L. Koch, 1839; Tarentula striata Kulczyński, 1895; Alopecosa striatipes Roewer, 1955

= Alopecosa striatipes =

Species of spider

Alopecosa striatipes is a wolf spider species in the genus Alopecosa found in Europe and Central Asia.
