= Alastor promotori =

Scientific classification
- Kingdom: Animalia
- Phylum: Arthropoda
- Clade: Pancrustacea
- Class: Insecta
- Order: Hymenoptera
- Family: Vespidae
- Genus: Alastor
- Species: A. promotori

Binomial name
- Alastor promotori Meade-Waldo, 1913

Species of wasp

Alastor promotori is a species of wasp in the family Vespidae.
