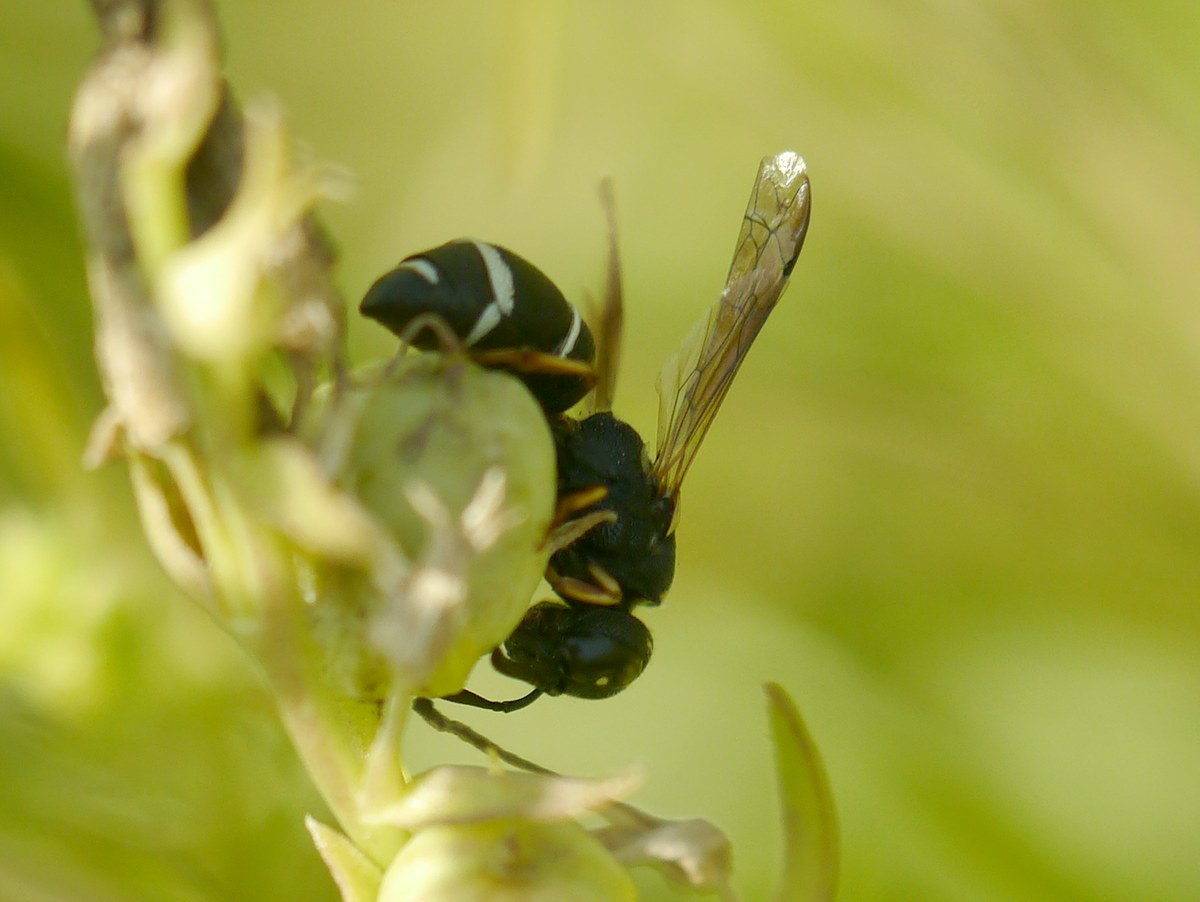
- Alastor mocsaryi

Scientific classification
- Kingdom: Animalia
- Phylum: Arthropoda
- Clade: Pancrustacea
- Class: Insecta
- Order: Hymenoptera
- Family: Vespidae
- Subfamily: Eumeninae
- Genus: Alastor; Lepeletier, 1841

Type species
- A. atropos Lepeletier, 1841

Species
- See text

= Alastor (wasp) =

Genus of wasps

Alastor is a Palearctic, Indomalayan and Afrotropical genus of potter wasps, primarily found in tropical Africa. It is divided into the 4 subgenera Alastor, Alastorellus, Megalastor and Parastalor.

== Species ==
- A. abditus
- A. (Alastor) aeger Giordani Soika, 1983
- A. aegyptiacus
- A. afghanicus
- A. albocinctus
- A. algeriensis
- A. angulicollis
- A. anomalus
- A. antigae
- A. arabicus
- A. ardens
- A. arnoldi
- A. asiaticus
- A. atropos Lepeltier, 1841
- A. baidoensis
- A. biegelebeni
- A. bilamellatus
- A. bilaminatus
- A. bispinosus
- A. braunsi
- A. (Alastor) brevicornis Selis, 2020
- A. bucida
- A. bulgaricus
- A. (Alastor) carens Selis, 2020
- A. carinulatus
- A. chrysocephalus
- A. concitatus
- A. conicus
- A. cylindricus
- A. dalyi
- A. darius
- A. elisaei
- A. esfandiarii
- A. exornatus
- A. facilis
- A. faustus
- A. festae
- A. gestroi
- A. (Alastor) gestroides Selis, 2020
- A. globosus
- A. guichardi
- A. harterti
- A. heymonsi
- A. iconius
- A. incospicuus
- A. iranus
- A. kochi
- A. korbi
- A. kuehlhorni
- A. lateritius
- A. lucida
- A. madecassus
- A. mandibularis
- A. maroccanus
- A. mediomaculatus
- A. merceti
- A. micra
- A. minutepunctatus
- A. mocsaryi
- A. (Alastor) moody Selis, 2020
- A. muticoides
- A. muticus
- A. (Alastor) namibiensis Selis, 2020
- A. nigroflavus
- A. nitens
- A. olivieri
- A. pannonicus
- A. paraguayensis
- A. (Alastor) parilis Selis, 2020
- A. pentheri
- A. persimilis
- A. (Alastorellus) planipunctus Selis, 2020
- A. plicatus
- A. possibilis
- A. problematicus
- A. procax
- A. promontorii
- A. promotori
- A. pronotalis
- A. punjabensis
- A. quadraticollis
- A. ricae
- A. rubripes
- A. ruficornis
- A. (Alastor) sabrinae Selis, 2020
- A. sanctus
- A. savignyi
- A. schinzii
- A. schulthessianus
- A. schwarzi
- A. seidenstueckeri
- A. similis
- A. simillimus
- A. slevini
- A. specularis
- A. stevensoni
- A. submissus
- A. sulcatus
- A. sulcifer
- A. (Alastor) temperatus Selis, 2020
- A. thymbrinus
- A. turneri
- A. variolosus
- A. xerxes
- A. zoroaster
