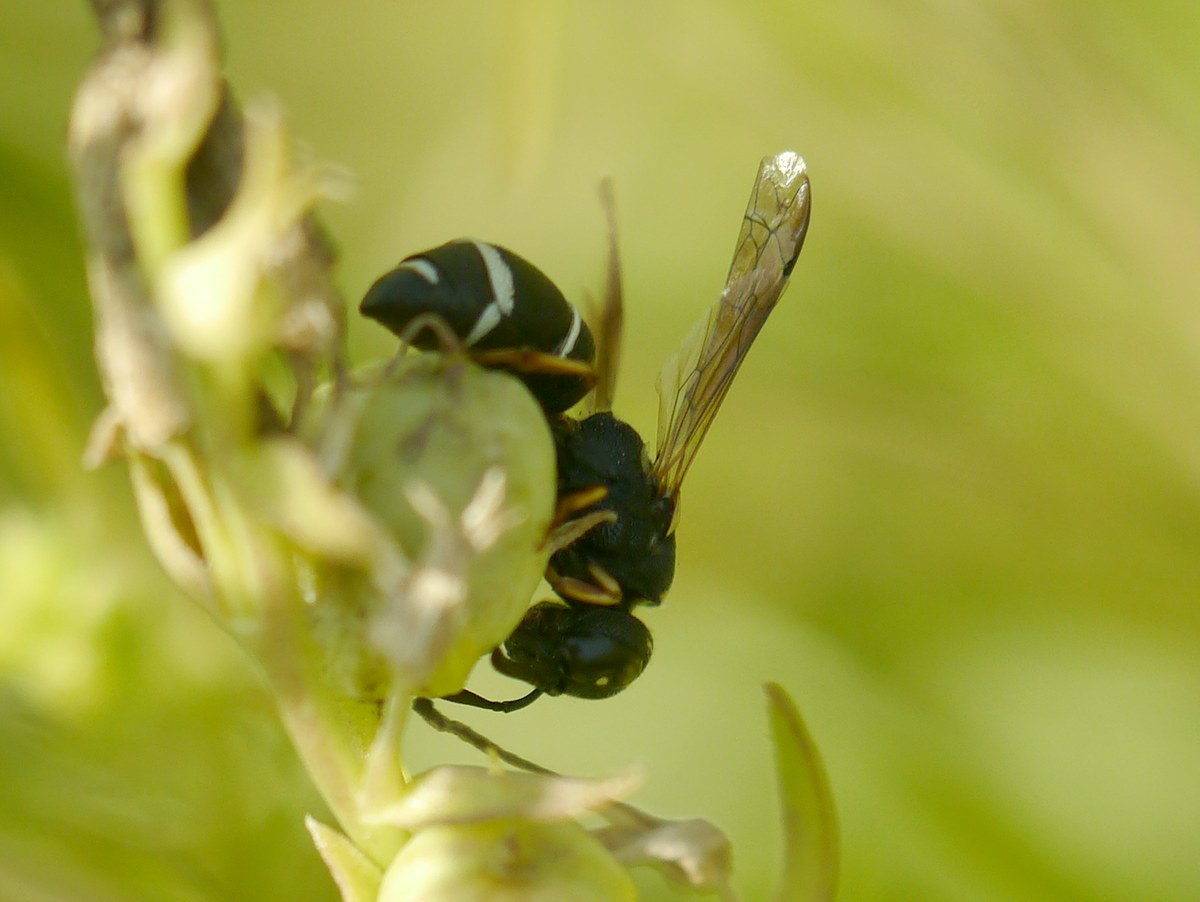
- Alastor mocsaryi

Scientific classification
- Kingdom: Animalia
- Phylum: Arthropoda
- Clade: Pancrustacea
- Class: Insecta
- Order: Hymenoptera
- Family: Vespidae
- Genus: Alastor
- Species: A. mocsaryi

Binomial name
- Alastor mocsaryi (Andre, 1884)

= Alastor mocsaryi =

Species of wasp

Alastor mocsaryi is a species of wasp in the family Vespidae.
