= Acartauchenius leprieuri =

Scientific classification
- Domain: Eukaryota
- Kingdom: Animalia
- Phylum: Arthropoda
- Subphylum: Chelicerata
- Class: Arachnida
- Order: Araneae
- Infraorder: Araneomorphae
- Family: Linyphiidae
- Genus: Acartauchenius
- Species: A. leprieuri

Binomial name
- Acartauchenius leprieuri (O.P.-Cambridge, 1875)

Species of spider

Acartauchenius leprieuri is a species of sheet weaver found in Algeria. It was described by O.P.-Cambridge in 1875.
