= Alastor albocinctus =

Scientific classification
- Kingdom: Animalia
- Phylum: Arthropoda
- Clade: Pancrustacea
- Class: Insecta
- Order: Hymenoptera
- Family: Vespidae
- Genus: Alastor
- Species: A. albocinctus

Binomial name
- Alastor albocinctus (Smith, 1857)

Species of wasp

Alastor albocinctus is a species of wasp in the family Vespidae.
