= Alastor dalyi =

Scientific classification
- Kingdom: Animalia
- Phylum: Arthropoda
- Clade: Pancrustacea
- Class: Insecta
- Order: Hymenoptera
- Family: Vespidae
- Genus: Alastor
- Species: A. dalyi

Binomial name
- Alastor dalyi Giordani Soika, 1979

Species of wasp

Alastor dalyi is a species of wasp in the family Vespidae which inhabits the Arabian peninsula.

== Discovery ==
Alastor dalyi was described by Giordani Soika in 1979 based on eight paratypes. He published a description of his species in an article titled Eumenidae recolti nell' Arabia meridionale da K. Guichard (Eumenidae collected in southern Arabia by K. Guichard). The paratypes are held in the Natural History Museum of Venice.

== Distribution ==
Specimens of Alastor dalyi have been identified in Oman, Saudi Arabia, and the United Arab Emirates.
