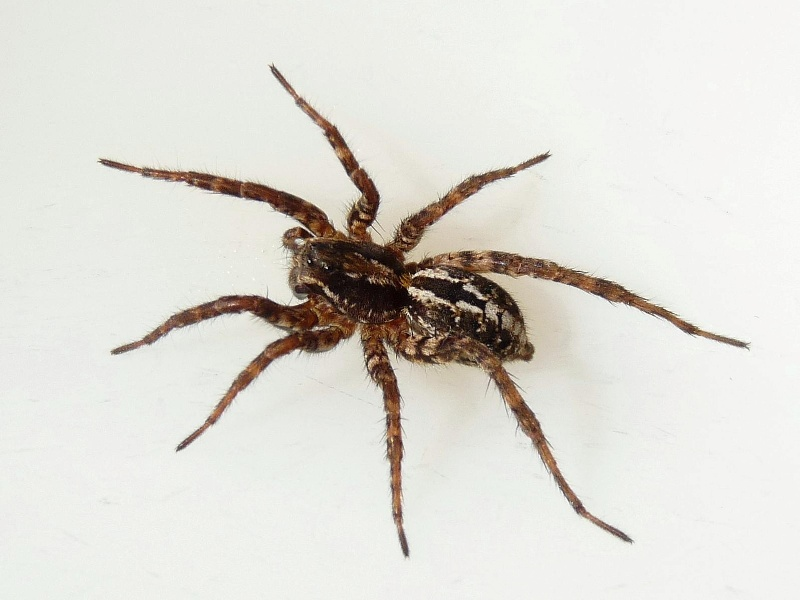

Scientific classification
- Kingdom: Animalia
- Phylum: Arthropoda
- Subphylum: Chelicerata
- Class: Arachnida
- Order: Araneae
- Infraorder: Araneomorphae
- Family: Lycosidae
- Genus: Alopecosa
- Species: A. accentuata

Binomial name
- Alopecosa accentuata (Latreille, 1817)

Synonyms
- Lycosa accentuata Latreille, 1817; Lycosa andrenivora Walckenaer, 1817; Lycosa cruciata Sundevall, 1833; Lycosa barbipes Sundevall, 1833; Tarentula accentuata (Latreille, 1817); Tarentula inquilina Ohlert, 1867; Tarentula andrenivora (Walckenaer, 1817); Tarentula barbipes (Sundevall, 1833); Alopecosa barbipes (Sundevall, 1833); Alopecosa accentuata (Latreille, 1817)

= Alopecosa accentuata =

Species of spider

Alopecosa accentuata is a species of wolf spider found commonly in open habitats throughout continental Europe with a reported palearctic distribution. The female has a body length (excluding legs) of up to 12 mm, the male is rather smaller at up to 9 mm. The name was at one time treated as a nomen dubium, but is now considered the correct name of Alopecosa barbipes.

== Description ==
The female has a dark brown carapace with an irregular pale central stripe and white marks at the sides of the eyes. The abdomen also has a pale central band, interrupted by dark chevrons. The femora are conspicuously banded white but the rest of the leg is usually dark. The male is generally similar in appearance except that the legs are usually all dark and it sometimes has a covering of fine white hairs over the entire body.

The female matures in the autumn and overwinters as an adult, the male not becoming mature until the spring, when mating takes place.
