= Acartauchenius insigniceps =

Scientific classification
- Kingdom: Animalia
- Phylum: Arthropoda
- Subphylum: Chelicerata
- Class: Arachnida
- Order: Araneae
- Infraorder: Araneomorphae
- Family: Linyphiidae
- Genus: Acartauchenius
- Species: A. insigniceps

Binomial name
- Acartauchenius insigniceps (Simon, 1894)

Species of spider

Acartauchenius insigniceps is a species of sheet weaver found in Algeria, Morocco and Tunisia. It was described by Simon in 1894.
