= Acartauchenius minor =

Scientific classification
- Domain: Eukaryota
- Kingdom: Animalia
- Phylum: Arthropoda
- Subphylum: Chelicerata
- Class: Arachnida
- Order: Araneae
- Infraorder: Araneomorphae
- Family: Linyphiidae
- Genus: Acartauchenius
- Species: A. minor

Binomial name
- Acartauchenius minor (Millidge, 1979)

Species of spider

Acartauchenius minor is a species of sheet weaver. Endemic to Italy, it was described by Millidge in 1979.
