= Alopecosa edax =

Scientific classification
- Kingdom: Animalia
- Phylum: Arthropoda
- Subphylum: Chelicerata
- Class: Arachnida
- Order: Araneae
- Infraorder: Araneomorphae
- Family: Lycosidae
- Genus: Alopecosa
- Species: A. edax

Binomial name
- Alopecosa edax (Thorell, 1875)

Species of spider

Alopecosa edax is a wolf spider species in the genus Alopecosa found in Poland and China.
