= Acartauchenius monoceros =

Scientific classification
- Kingdom: Animalia
- Phylum: Arthropoda
- Subphylum: Chelicerata
- Class: Arachnida
- Order: Araneae
- Infraorder: Araneomorphae
- Family: Linyphiidae
- Genus: Acartauchenius
- Species: A. monoceros

Binomial name
- Acartauchenius monoceros (Tanasevitch, 1989)

Species of spider

Acartauchenius monoceros is a species of sheet weaver found in Uzbekistan. It was described by Tanasevitch in 1989.
