= Alastor bilaminatus =

Scientific classification
- Kingdom: Animalia
- Phylum: Arthropoda
- Class: Insecta
- Order: Hymenoptera
- Family: Vespidae
- Genus: Alastor
- Species: A. bilaminatus

Binomial name
- Alastor bilaminatus Giordani Soika 1942

Species of wasp

Alastor bilaminatus is a species of wasp in the family Vespidae.
