= Alopecosa pentheri =

Scientific classification
- Kingdom: Animalia
- Phylum: Arthropoda
- Subphylum: Chelicerata
- Class: Arachnida
- Order: Araneae
- Infraorder: Araneomorphae
- Family: Lycosidae
- Genus: Alopecosa
- Species: A. pentheri

Binomial name
- Alopecosa pentheri (Nosek, 1905)

Synonyms
- Pardosa pentheri Nosek, 1905; Lycosa cursor insignis Nosek, 1905; Tarentula cursor elatior Kratochvíl, 1935; Alopecosa pentheri Tongiorgi, 1966

Species of spider

Alopecosa pentheri is a species of wolf spiders in the genus Alopecosa found in Europe (Bulgaria, Greece) to Azerbaijan.
