= Alastor facilis =

Scientific classification
- Kingdom: Animalia
- Phylum: Arthropoda
- Clade: Pancrustacea
- Class: Insecta
- Order: Hymenoptera
- Family: Vespidae
- Genus: Alastor
- Species: A. facilis

Binomial name
- Alastor facilis Giordani Soika, 1934

Species of wasp

Alastor facilis is a species of wasp in the family Vespidae.
