= Alopecosa psammophila =

Scientific classification
- Kingdom: Animalia
- Phylum: Arthropoda
- Subphylum: Chelicerata
- Class: Arachnida
- Order: Araneae
- Infraorder: Araneomorphae
- Family: Lycosidae
- Genus: Alopecosa
- Species: A. psammophila

Binomial name
- Alopecosa psammophila Buchar, 2001

Species of spider

Alopecosa psammophila is a wolf spider species in the genus Alopecosa found in the Czech Republic, Slovakia, Hungary, Romania, and Russia.
