= Alastor algeriensis =

Scientific classification
- Kingdom: Animalia
- Phylum: Arthropoda
- Clade: Pancrustacea
- Class: Insecta
- Order: Hymenoptera
- Family: Vespidae
- Genus: Alastor
- Species: A. algeriensis

Binomial name
- Alastor algeriensis Blüthgen, 1939

Species of wasp

Alastor algeriensis is a species of wasp in the family Vespidae.
