= Acartauchenius mutabilis =

Scientific classification
- Kingdom: Animalia
- Phylum: Arthropoda
- Subphylum: Chelicerata
- Class: Arachnida
- Order: Araneae
- Infraorder: Araneomorphae
- Family: Linyphiidae
- Genus: Acartauchenius
- Species: A. mutabilis

Binomial name
- Acartauchenius mutabilis (Denis, 1967)

Species of spider

Acartauchenius mutabilis is a species of sheet weaver spider found in Algeria, Morocco and Tunisia. It was described by Jacques Denis in 1967.
