= Alastor rubripes =

Scientific classification
- Kingdom: Animalia
- Phylum: Arthropoda
- Clade: Pancrustacea
- Class: Insecta
- Order: Hymenoptera
- Family: Vespidae
- Genus: Alastor
- Species: A. rubripes

Binomial name
- Alastor rubripes Gusenleitner, 1967

Species of wasp

Alastor rubripes is a species of wasp in the family Vespidae.
