= Alastor seidenstueckeri =

Scientific classification
- Kingdom: Animalia
- Phylum: Arthropoda
- Clade: Pancrustacea
- Class: Insecta
- Order: Hymenoptera
- Family: Vespidae
- Genus: Alastor
- Species: A. seidenstueckeri

Binomial name
- Alastor seidenstueckeri Bluethgen, 1956

Species of wasp

Alastor seidenstueckeri is a species of wasp in the family Vespidae.
