= Acartauchenius desertus =

Scientific classification
- Kingdom: Animalia
- Phylum: Arthropoda
- Subphylum: Chelicerata
- Class: Arachnida
- Order: Araneae
- Infraorder: Araneomorphae
- Family: Linyphiidae
- Genus: Acartauchenius
- Species: A. desertus

Binomial name
- Acartauchenius desertus (Tanasevitch, 1993)

Species of spider

Acartauchenius desertus is a species of sheet weaver found in Kazakhstan. It was described by Tanasevitch in 1993.
