= Anomalosa oz =

Scientific classification
- Kingdom: Animalia
- Phylum: Arthropoda
- Subphylum: Chelicerata
- Class: Arachnida
- Order: Araneae
- Infraorder: Araneomorphae
- Family: Lycosidae
- Genus: Anomalosa
- Species: A. oz

Binomial name
- Anomalosa oz Framenau, 2006

Species of spider

Holotype (WAM T65677) site: Barmah State Forest

Anomalosa oz is a spider in the Lycosidae family (wolf spiders). It was first described in 2006 by Volker Framenau.

It is endemic to Australia and found in New South Wales, Victoria, and South Australia.
