= Alastor sulcatus =

Scientific classification
- Kingdom: Animalia
- Phylum: Arthropoda
- Clade: Pancrustacea
- Class: Insecta
- Order: Hymenoptera
- Family: Vespidae
- Genus: Alastor
- Species: A. sulcatus

Binomial name
- Alastor sulcatus Vecht, 1981

Species of wasp

Alastor sulcatus is a species of wasp in the family Vespidae.
