= Acartauchenius bedeli =

Scientific classification
- Kingdom: Animalia
- Phylum: Arthropoda
- Subphylum: Chelicerata
- Class: Arachnida
- Order: Araneae
- Infraorder: Araneomorphae
- Family: Linyphiidae
- Genus: Acartauchenius
- Species: A. bedeli

Binomial name
- Acartauchenius bedeli (Simon, 1884)

Species of spider

Acartauchenius bedeli is a species of sheet weaver found in Algeria. It was described by Simon in 1884.
