= Acartauchenius scurrilis =

Scientific classification
- Domain: Eukaryota
- Kingdom: Animalia
- Phylum: Arthropoda
- Subphylum: Chelicerata
- Class: Arachnida
- Order: Araneae
- Infraorder: Araneomorphae
- Family: Linyphiidae
- Genus: Acartauchenius
- Species: A. scurrilis

Binomial name
- Acartauchenius scurrilis (O.P.-Cambridge, 1872)

Species of spider

Acartauchenius scurrilis is a species of sheet weaver found in the Palearctic. It was described by O.P.-Cambridge in 1872.
