= Acartauchenius orientalis =

Scientific classification
- Domain: Eukaryota
- Kingdom: Animalia
- Phylum: Arthropoda
- Subphylum: Chelicerata
- Class: Arachnida
- Order: Araneae
- Infraorder: Araneomorphae
- Family: Linyphiidae
- Genus: Acartauchenius
- Species: A. orientalis

Binomial name
- Acartauchenius orientalis Wunderlich, 1995

Species of spider

Acartauchenius orientalis is a species of sheet weaver found in Mongolia. It was described by Wunderlich in 1995.
