= Alopecosa huabanna =

Scientific classification
- Domain: Eukaryota
- Kingdom: Animalia
- Phylum: Arthropoda
- Subphylum: Chelicerata
- Class: Arachnida
- Order: Araneae
- Infraorder: Araneomorphae
- Family: Lycosidae
- Genus: Alopecosa
- Species: A. huabanna

Binomial name
- Alopecosa huabanna Chen, Song & Gao, 2000

Species of spider

Alopecosa huabanna is a species of wolf spider found in Inner Mongolia in the People's Republic of China. The female has a length (excluding legs) of about 10 mm, the male being smaller at around 8 mm. Both sexes are generally dark brown with a longitudinal yellow band along the back of the carapace and abdomen, which distinctively has 4 paired branches towards the back of the abdomen. The male has much hairier legs than the female.

It is similar to Alopecosa ovalis and several other species.
