= Alopecosa cronebergi =

Scientific classification
- Kingdom: Animalia
- Phylum: Arthropoda
- Subphylum: Chelicerata
- Class: Arachnida
- Order: Araneae
- Infraorder: Araneomorphae
- Family: Lycosidae
- Genus: Alopecosa
- Species: A. cronebergi

Binomial name
- Alopecosa cronebergi (Thorell, 1875)

Species of arachnid

Alopecosa cronebergi is a wolf spider species in the genus Alopecosa found in Ukraine, Russia, Kazakhstan, and Hungary (which is "doubtful"). The species was first described by Tamerlan Thorell in 1875, as Tarentula cronebergi. It was transferred to the genus Alopecosa in 1955 by Carl Friedrich Roewer.
