= Alopecosa taeniopus =

Scientific classification
- Kingdom: Animalia
- Phylum: Arthropoda
- Subphylum: Chelicerata
- Class: Arachnida
- Order: Araneae
- Infraorder: Araneomorphae
- Family: Lycosidae
- Genus: Alopecosa
- Species: A. taeniopus

Binomial name
- Alopecosa taeniopus (Kulczynski, 1895)

Species of spider

Alopecosa taeniopus is a wolf spider species in the genus Alopecosa found from "Greece to China".
