= Alopecosa mariae =

Scientific classification
- Kingdom: Animalia
- Phylum: Arthropoda
- Subphylum: Chelicerata
- Class: Arachnida
- Order: Araneae
- Infraorder: Araneomorphae
- Family: Lycosidae
- Genus: Alopecosa
- Species: A. mariae

Binomial name
- Alopecosa mariae (Dahl, 1908)

Subspecies
- Alopecosa mariae orientalis (Kolosvary, 1934) — Hungary

Species of spider

Alopecosa mariae is a wolf spider species in the genus Alopecosa with a palearctic distribution.
