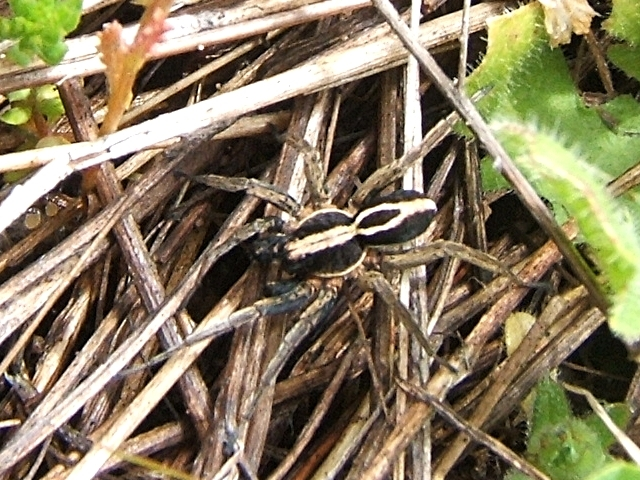

Scientific classification
- Kingdom: Animalia
- Phylum: Arthropoda
- Subphylum: Chelicerata
- Class: Arachnida
- Order: Araneae
- Infraorder: Araneomorphae
- Family: Lycosidae
- Genus: Alopecosa
- Species: A. cuneata

Binomial name
- Alopecosa cuneata (Clerck, 1757)

= Alopecosa cuneata =

Species of spider

Alopecosa cuneata is a species of spiders belonging to the family Lycosidae.

It is native to Eurasia.
