= Alastor guichardi =

Scientific classification
- Kingdom: Animalia
- Phylum: Arthropoda
- Clade: Pancrustacea
- Class: Insecta
- Order: Hymenoptera
- Family: Vespidae
- Genus: Alastor
- Species: A. guichardi

Binomial name
- Alastor guichardi Giordani Soika, 1958

Species of wasp

Alastor guichardi is a species of wasp in the family Vespidae.
