= Alastor aeger =

Scientific classification
- Kingdom: Animalia
- Phylum: Arthropoda
- Clade: Pancrustacea
- Class: Insecta
- Order: Hymenoptera
- Family: Vespidae
- Genus: Alastor
- Species: A. aeger

Binomial name
- Alastor aeger Giordani Soika 1983

Species of wasp

Alastor (Alastor) aeger is a species of wasp in the family Vespidae.

== Distribution ==
Alastor aeger is known from southern Africa, and is recorded from Namibia, Zimbabwe, South Africa, and Mozambique (Rikatla, Delagoa).
