= Alastor esfandiarii =

Scientific classification
- Kingdom: Animalia
- Phylum: Arthropoda
- Clade: Pancrustacea
- Class: Insecta
- Order: Hymenoptera
- Family: Vespidae
- Genus: Alastor
- Species: A. esfandiarii

Binomial name
- Alastor esfandiarii Giordani Soika, 1970

Species of wasp

Alastor esfandiarii is a species of wasp in the family Vespidae.
