= Acartauchenius simoni =

Scientific classification
- Domain: Eukaryota
- Kingdom: Animalia
- Phylum: Arthropoda
- Subphylum: Chelicerata
- Class: Arachnida
- Order: Araneae
- Infraorder: Araneomorphae
- Family: Linyphiidae
- Genus: Acartauchenius
- Species: A. simoni

Binomial name
- Acartauchenius simoni Bosmans, 2002

Species of spider

Acartauchenius simoni is a species of sheet weaver found in Algeria. It was described by Bosmans in 2002.
