= Acartauchenius hamulifer =

Scientific classification
- Kingdom: Animalia
- Phylum: Arthropoda
- Subphylum: Chelicerata
- Class: Arachnida
- Order: Araneae
- Infraorder: Araneomorphae
- Family: Linyphiidae
- Genus: Acartauchenius
- Species: A. hamulifer

Binomial name
- Acartauchenius hamulifer (Denis, 1937)

Species of spider

Acartauchenius hamulifer is a species of sheet weaver found in Algeria. It was described by Jacques Denis in 1937.
