= Alastor variolosus =

Scientific classification
- Kingdom: Animalia
- Phylum: Arthropoda
- Clade: Pancrustacea
- Class: Insecta
- Order: Hymenoptera
- Family: Vespidae
- Genus: Alastor
- Species: A. variolosus

Binomial name
- Alastor variolosus Bingham, 1897

Species of wasp

Alastor variolosus is a species of wasp in the family Vespidae.
