= Alastor atropos =

Scientific classification
- Kingdom: Animalia
- Phylum: Arthropoda
- Class: Insecta
- Order: Hymenoptera
- Family: Vespidae
- Genus: Alastor
- Species: A. atropos

Binomial name
- Alastor atropos Lepeletier 1841

Species of wasp

Alastor atropos is a species of wasp in the family Vespidae.
