= Alopecosa kovblyuki =

Scientific classification
- Kingdom: Animalia
- Phylum: Arthropoda
- Subphylum: Chelicerata
- Class: Arachnida
- Order: Araneae
- Infraorder: Araneomorphae
- Family: Lycosidae
- Genus: Alopecosa
- Species: A. kovblyuki

Binomial name
- Alopecosa kovblyuki Nadolny & Ponomarev, 2012

Species of spider

Alopecosa kovblyuki is a wolf spider species found in Russia and Ukraine.
