= Anomalosa =

Scientific classification
- Kingdom: Animalia
- Phylum: Arthropoda
- Subphylum: Chelicerata
- Class: Arachnida
- Order: Araneae
- Infraorder: Araneomorphae
- Family: Lycosidae
- Genus: Anomalosa; Roewer, 1960

Species
- Anomalosa kochi (Simon, 1898); Anomalosa oz Framenau, 2006

Genus of spiders

Anomalosa is a genus of spiders in the family Lycosidae. It was first described in 1960 by Carl Friedrich Roewer. The type species is Anomalosa kochi.

The genus is endemic to Australia and found in Queensland, New South Wales, Victoria and South Australia.

As of 2017, it contains 2 Australian species.
