= Alastor arabicus =

Scientific classification
- Kingdom: Animalia
- Phylum: Arthropoda
- Class: Insecta
- Order: Hymenoptera
- Family: Vespidae
- Genus: Alastor
- Species: A. arabicus

Binomial name
- Alastor arabicus Giordani Soika 1979

Species of wasp

Alastor arabicus is a species of wasp in the family Vespidae.
