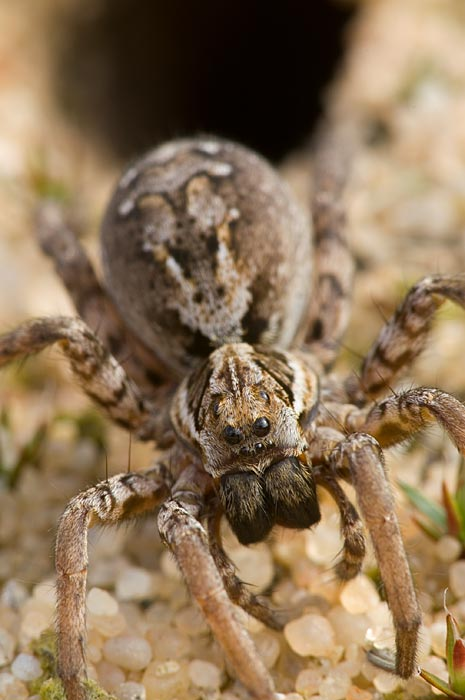
- female A. fabrilis

Scientific classification
- Domain: Eukaryota
- Kingdom: Animalia
- Phylum: Arthropoda
- Subphylum: Chelicerata
- Class: Arachnida
- Order: Araneae
- Infraorder: Araneomorphae
- Family: Lycosidae
- Genus: Alopecosa; Simon, 1885

Species
- See text.

= Alopecosa =

Genus of spiders

Alopecosa is a spider genus in the family Lycosidae (wolf spiders), with about 160 species. They have a largely Eurasian distribution, although some species are found in North Africa and North America.

== Life cycle ==
Most species grow up to 2 cm. Alopecosa females make a burrow in which they deposit their egg sac. The female then stays in the burrow guarding the sac until the eggs hatch.

== Taxonomy ==
Alopecosa inquilina

The species in this genus have been traditionally grouped into sibling species complexes (groups) based on morphological characters, but, as morphology-based taxonomy can be unreliable, alternative methods have also been employed to identify species correctly. For example, differences in observed courtship and copulation behaviour have proved to be a useful tool for species identification and delimitation, particularly in cryptic species. Molecular techniques have also been applied to reconstruct phylogenetic relationships between some species.

=== Species ===
As of January 2021, the World Spider Catalog accepted the following species:

- Alopecosa accentuata (Latreille, 1817) – Europe
- Alopecosa aculeata (Clerck, 1757) – North America, Europe, Turkey, Caucasus, Russia (Europe to Far East), Iran, Central Asia, China, Japan
- Alopecosa akkolka Marusik, 1995 – Kazakhstan, China
- Alopecosa albofasciata (Brullé, 1832) – Mediterranean to Central Asia
- Alopecosa albonotata (Schmidt, 1895) – Russia (Middle Siberia)
- Alopecosa albostriata (Grube, 1861) – Russia (West to East Siberia, Far East)
- Alopecosa albovittata (Schmidt, 1895) – Russia (Middle Siberia)
- Alopecosa alpicola (Simon, 1876) – Spain, France, Italy, Russia (Europe), China, Caucasus?, Kazakhstan?
- Alopecosa andesiana (Berland, 1913) – Ecuador
- Alopecosa artenarensis Wunderlich, 1992 – Canary Is.
- Alopecosa atis Caporiacco, 1949 – Libya
- Alopecosa auripilosa (Schenkel, 1953) – Russia (Far East), China, Korea
- Alopecosa aurita Chen, Song & Kim, 2001 – China
- Alopecosa ayubaevorum Fomichev & Logunov, 2015 – Russia (Altai)
- Alopecosa azsheganovae Esyunin, 1996 – Russia (Europe to South Siberia)
- Alopecosa balinensis (Giltay, 1935) – Indonesia (Bali)
- Alopecosa beckeri (Thorell, 1875) – Ukraine
- Alopecosa camerunensis Roewer, 1960 – Cameroon
- Alopecosa canaricola Schmidt, 1982 – Canary Is.
- Alopecosa cedroensis Wunderlich, 1992 – Canary Is.
- Alopecosa chagyabensis Hu & Li, 1987 – China
- Alopecosa cinnameopilosa (Schenkel, 1963) – Kazakhstan, Russia (Central Asia to Far East), China, Korea, Japan
- Alopecosa cronebergi (Thorell, 1875) – Slovakia, Ukraine, Russia (Europe), Caucasus, Kazakhstan
- Alopecosa cuneata (Clerck, 1757) – Europe, Turkey, Caucasus, Russia (Europe to Far East), Kazakhstan, China
- Alopecosa cursor (Hahn, 1831) – Europe, Turkey, Caucasus, Russia (Europe to South Siberia), Iran, Central Asia, China
- Alopecosa cursorioides Charitonov, 1969 – Uzbekistan, Turkmenistan
- Alopecosa curtohirta Tang, Urita & Song, 1993 – China
- Alopecosa deserta Ponomarev, 2007 – Kazakhstan
- Alopecosa disca Tang, Yin & Yang, 1997 – China
- Alopecosa dryada Cordes, 1996 – Greece
- Alopecosa edax (Thorell, 1875) – Poland, China
- Alopecosa ermolaevi Savelyeva, 1972 – Kazakhstan
- Alopecosa etrusca Lugetti & Tongiorgi, 1969 – Italy, North Macedonia, Turkey
- Alopecosa exasperans (O. Pickard-Cambridge, 1877) – Canada, Greenland
- Alopecosa fabrilis (Clerck, 1757) (type species) – Europe, Turkey, Russia (Europe to Far East), Central Asia, China
- Alopecosa farinosa (Herman, 1879) – Europe, Turkey, Caucasus, Russia (Europe to Far East), Kazakhstan, Iran?
- Alopecosa fedotovi (Charitonov, 1946) – Central Asia
- Alopecosa fuerteventurensis Wunderlich, 1992 – Canary Is.
- Alopecosa fulvastra Caporiacco, 1955 – Venezuela
- Alopecosa gachangensis Seo, 2017 – Korea
- Alopecosa garamantica (Caporiacco, 1936) – Libya
- Alopecosa gomerae (Strand, 1911) – Canary Is.
- Alopecosa gracilis (Bösenberg, 1895) – Canary Is.
- Alopecosa grancanariensis Wunderlich, 1992 – Canary Is.
- Alopecosa hamata (Schenkel, 1963) – China
- Alopecosa hermiguensis Wunderlich, 1992 – Canary Is.
- Alopecosa himalayaensis Hu, 2001 – China
- Alopecosa hingganica Tang, Urita & Song, 1993 – Mongolia, China
- Alopecosa hirta (Kulczyński, 1908) – Russia (north-eastern Siberia)
- Alopecosa hirtipes (Kulczyński, 1907) – Canada, USA (Alaska), Russia (Europe to Far East)
- Alopecosa hoevelsi Schmidt & Barensteiner, 2000 – China
- Alopecosa hokkaidensis Tanaka, 1985 – Russia (Far East), China, Japan
- Alopecosa huabanna Chen, Song & Gao, 2000 – China
- Alopecosa hui Chen, Song & Kim, 2001 – China
- Alopecosa inderensis Ponomarev, 2007 – Russia (Europe), Kazakhstan
- Alopecosa inimica (O. Pickard-Cambridge, 1885) – Tajikistan
- Alopecosa inquilina (Clerck, 1757) – Europe, Russia (Europe to Far East), Kazakhstan
- Alopecosa irinae Lobanova, 1978 – Russia (South Siberia)
- Alopecosa kalahariana Roewer, 1960 – Botswana
- Alopecosa kalavrita Buchar, 2001 – Greece
- Alopecosa kaplanovi Oliger, 1983 – Russia (Far East)
- Alopecosa kasakhstanica Savelyeva, 1972 – Russia (West to South Siberia, Central Asia), Kazakhstan
- Alopecosa kochi (Keyserling, 1877) – North America
- Alopecosa koponeni Blagoev & Dondale, 2014 – Canada
- Alopecosa kovblyuki Nadolny & Ponomarev, 2012 – Ukraine, Russia (Europe, West Siberia), Kazakhstan
- Alopecosa kratochvili (Schenkel, 1963) – China
- Alopecosa krynickii (Thorell, 1875) – Ukraine (Crimea)
- Alopecosa kulczynski Sternbergs, 1979 – Russia (Middle Siberia to Far East)
- Alopecosa kulczynskii (Bösenberg, 1895) – Canary Is.
- Alopecosa kulsaryensis Ponomarev, 2012 – Kazakhstan
- Alopecosa kungurica Esyunin, 1996 – Russia (Europe)
- Alopecosa kuntzi Denis, 1953 – Italy (Sicily), Turkey, Russia (Caucasus), Yemen
- Alopecosa laciniosa (Simon, 1876) – Spain, France
- Alopecosa lallemandi (Berland, 1913) – Ecuador
- Alopecosa latifasciata (Kroneberg, 1875) – Central Asia
- Alopecosa leonhardii (Strand, 1913) – Australia (Central)
- Alopecosa lessertiana Brignoli, 1983 – China
- Alopecosa licenti (Schenkel, 1953) – Russia (South Siberia, Far East), Mongolia, China, Korea
- Alopecosa lindbergi Roewer, 1960 – Afghanistan
- Alopecosa linzhan Chen & Song, 2003 – China
- Alopecosa litvinovi Izmailova, 1989 – Russia (South Siberia)
- Alopecosa longicymbia Savelyeva, 1972 – Kazakhstan
- Alopecosa madigani (Hickman, 1944) – Australia (Northern Territory)
- Alopecosa mariae (Dahl, 1908) – Italy, Central Europe to Ukraine and south-eastern Europe, Russia (Europe to South Siberia), China
- Alopecosa marikovskyi Logunov, 2013 – Kazakhstan
- Alopecosa medvedevi Ponomarev, 2009 – Kazakhstan
- Alopecosa michaelseni (Simon, 1902) – Chile
- Alopecosa mikhailovi Omelko, Marusik & Koponen, 2013 – Russia (Sakhalin)
- Alopecosa moesta (Holmberg, 1876) – Argentina
- Alopecosa mojonia (Mello-Leitão, 1941) – Argentina
- Alopecosa moriutii Tanaka, 1985 – Russia (Far East), Korea, Japan
- Alopecosa mutabilis (Kulczyński, 1908) – Russia (Europe to East Siberia), USA (Alaska)
- Alopecosa nagpag Chen, Song & Kim, 2001 – China
- Alopecosa nemurensis (Strand, 1907) – Japan
- Alopecosa nigricans (Simon, 1886) – Argentina, Falkland Is.
- Alopecosa nitidus Hu, 2001 – China
- Alopecosa notabilis (Schmidt, 1895) – Kazakhstan
- Alopecosa nybelini Roewer, 1960 – Afghanistan
- Alopecosa oahuensis (Keyserling, 1890) – Hawaii
- Alopecosa obscura Schmidt, 1980 – Canary Is.
- Alopecosa obsoleta (C. L. Koch, 1847) – Turkmenistan
- Alopecosa ogorodica Trilikauskas & Azarkina, 2014 – Russia (Altai)
- Alopecosa orbisaca Peng, Yin, Zhang & Kim, 1997 – China
- Alopecosa orophila (Thorell, 1887) – Myanmar
- Alopecosa orotavensis (Strand, 1916) – Canary Is.
- Alopecosa osa Marusik, Hippa & Koponen, 1996 – Russia (South Siberia)
- Alopecosa osellai Lugetti & Tongiorgi, 1969 – Spain
- Alopecosa ovalis Chen, Song & Gao, 2000 – China
- Alopecosa palmae Schmidt, 1982 – Canary Is.
- Alopecosa passibilis (O. Pickard-Cambridge, 1885) – China
- Alopecosa pelusiaca (Audouin, 1826) – North Africa
- Alopecosa pentheri (Nosek, 1905) – Italy, south-eastern Europe, Ukraine, Turkey, Caucasus (Russia, Azerbaijan)
- Alopecosa pictilis (Emerton, 1885) – North America, Russia (South and north-eastern Siberia, Far East)
- Alopecosa pinetorum (Thorell, 1856) – Europe, Caucasus, Russia (Europe to South Siberia)
- Alopecosa psammophila Buchar, 2001 – Czechia, Slovakia, Hungary, Romania
- Alopecosa pseudocuneata (Schenkel, 1953) – China
- Alopecosa pulverulenta (Clerck, 1757) – Europe, Turkey, Caucasus, Russia (Europe to Far East), Kazakhstan, Iran, China, Korea, Japan
- Alopecosa pulverulenta tridentina (Thorell, 1875) – Austria
- Alopecosa raddei (Simon, 1889) – Central Asia
- Alopecosa rapa (Karsch, 1881) – Kiribati (Gilbert Is.)
- Alopecosa restricta Mello-Leitão, 1940 – Argentina
- Alopecosa rosea Mello-Leitão, 1945 – Argentina
- Alopecosa saurica Marusik, 1995 – Kazakhstan
- Alopecosa schmidti (Hahn, 1835) – Sweden, Central to eastern and south-eastern Europe, Turkey, Caucasus, Russia (Europe to South Siberia), Kazakhstan, Iran
- Alopecosa sciophila Ponomarev, 2008 – Kazakhstan
- Alopecosa sibirica (Kulczyński, 1908) – Russia (Middle Siberia to Far East), Mongolia, China
- Alopecosa simoni (Thorell, 1872) – Mediterranean
- Alopecosa sokhondoensis Logunov & Marusik, 1995 – Russia (Middle and South Siberia)
- Alopecosa solitaria (Herman, 1879) – Italy, Central to south-eastern and eastern Europe, Turkey, Caucasus, Russia (Europe to South Siberia), Kazakhstan
- Alopecosa solivaga (Kulczyński, 1901) – Russia (Europe, Siberia, Far East), Mongolia, China
- Alopecosa solivaga annulata (Kulczyński, 1916) – Russia (West Siberia)
- Alopecosa solivaga borea (Kulczyński, 1908) – Russia (Middle Siberia)
- Alopecosa solivaga katunjica (Ermolajev, 1937) – Russia (Altai)
- Alopecosa solivaga lineata (Kulczyński, 1916) – Russia (West Siberia)
- Alopecosa spasskyi Ponomarev, 2008 – Russia (Europe), Kazakhstan
- Alopecosa spinata Yu & Song, 1988 – China
- Alopecosa steppica Ponomarev, 2007 – Ukraine, Russia (Europe), Kazakhstan
- Alopecosa striatipes (C. L. Koch, 1839) – Europe, Turkey, Caucasus
- Alopecosa sublimbata Roewer, 1960 – Equatorial Guinea (Bioko)
- Alopecosa subrufa (Schenkel, 1963) – Russia (South Siberia), Mongolia, China
- Alopecosa subsolitaria Savelyeva, 1972 – Kazakhstan
- Alopecosa subvalida Guy, 1966 – Morocco
- Alopecosa sulzeri (Pavesi, 1873) – Europe, Caucasus, Russia (Europe to South Siberia), Kazakhstan
- Alopecosa taeniata (C. L. Koch, 1835) – Europe, Russia (Europe to South Siberia)
- Alopecosa taeniopus (Kulczyński, 1895) – Greece to China
- Alopecosa tanakai Omelko & Marusik, 2008 – Russia (Far East)
- Alopecosa thaleri Hepner & Paulus, 2007 – Canary Is.
- Alopecosa trabalis (Clerck, 1757) – Europe, Turkey, Russia (Europe to South Siberia), Kazakhstan, Iran, Central Asia
- Alopecosa tunetana Roewer, 1960 – Tunisia
- Alopecosa upembania Roewer, 1960 – Congo
- Alopecosa valida (Lucas, 1846) – Morocco, Algeria
- Alopecosa virgata (Kishida, 1910) – Russia (Far East), Korea, Japan
- Alopecosa volubilis Yoo, Kim & Tanaka, 2004 – Russia (Far East), Korea, Japan
- Alopecosa wenxianensis Tang, Yin & Yang, 1997 – China
- Alopecosa werneri (Roewer, 1960) – Algeria
- Alopecosa xiningensis Hu, 2001 – China
- Alopecosa xinjiangensis Hu & Wu, 1989 – Mongolia, China
- Alopecosa xuelin Tang & Zhang, 2004 – China
- Alopecosa yamalensis Esyunin, 1996 – Russia (Europe, West Siberia)
- Alopecosa zyuzini Logunov & Marusik, 1995 – Russia (South Siberia), Mongolia

=== Dubious names ===
Nomina dubia (dubious names) include:

- Alopecosa reimoseri (Kolosváry, 1934)
- Alopecosa strandi (Roșca, 1936)

== Distribution and habitat ==
The genus has a cosmopolitan distribution. The majority of species are native to Eurasia, although some species occur in Africa, and others are found in North and South America. Alopecosa fabrilis is a critically endangered species found in Britain, with examples rediscovered in 2020 in the south of the country. They favor dry climates.
