= Alastor angulicollis =

Scientific classification
- Kingdom: Animalia
- Phylum: Arthropoda
- Class: Insecta
- Order: Hymenoptera
- Family: Vespidae
- Genus: Alastor
- Species: A. angulicollis

Binomial name
- Alastor angulicollis (Spinola, 1851)

Synonyms
- Odynerus angulicollis Spinola, 1851

Species of wasp

Alastor angulicollis is a species of wasp in the subfamily Eumeninae found in South America. It was first described in 1851 by Maximilian Spinola, as Odynerus angulicollis, but was moved to the genus Alastor later in the same volume of Historia física y política de Chile, by Henri Louis Frédéric de Saussure. It is similar in appearance to Alastor argentinus. Alastor angulicollis occurs in Argentina and Chile.
