= Acartauchenius derisor =

Scientific classification
- Kingdom: Animalia
- Phylum: Arthropoda
- Subphylum: Chelicerata
- Class: Arachnida
- Order: Araneae
- Infraorder: Araneomorphae
- Family: Linyphiidae
- Genus: Acartauchenius
- Species: A. derisor

Binomial name
- Acartauchenius derisor (Simon, 1918 )

Species of spider

Acartauchenius derisor is a species of sheet weaver found in France. It was described by Simon in 1918.
