= Alastor cylindricus =

Scientific classification
- Kingdom: Animalia
- Phylum: Arthropoda
- Clade: Pancrustacea
- Class: Insecta
- Order: Hymenoptera
- Family: Vespidae
- Genus: Alastor
- Species: A. cylindricus

Binomial name
- Alastor cylindricus Giordani Soika, 1991

Species of wasp

Alastor cylindricus is a species of wasp in the family Vespidae.
