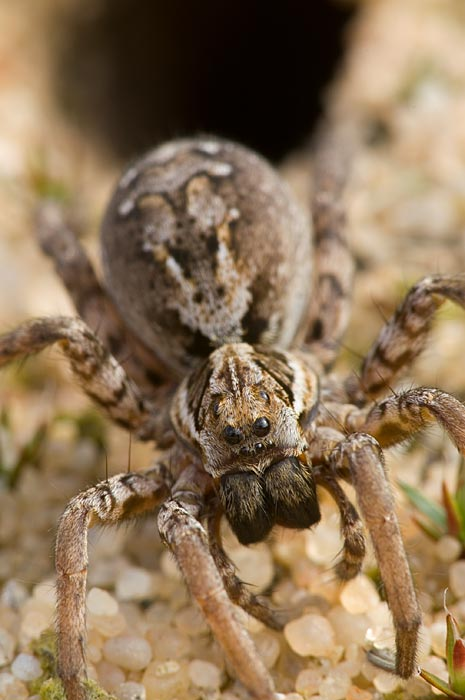

Scientific classification
- Kingdom: Animalia
- Phylum: Arthropoda
- Subphylum: Chelicerata
- Class: Arachnida
- Order: Araneae
- Infraorder: Araneomorphae
- Family: Lycosidae
- Genus: Alopecosa
- Species: A. fabrilis

Binomial name
- Alopecosa fabrilis (Clerck, 1757)

Synonyms
- Araneus fabrilis Clerck, 1757; Lycosa fabrilis (Clerck, 1757); Lycosa melanogaster Hahn, 1833; Tarentula fabrilis (Clerck, 1757)

= Alopecosa fabrilis =

Species of wolf spider

Alopecosa fabrilis, known as the great fox-spider, is a species of wolf spider in the family Lycosidae. It is found over much of Europe Eastern Russia, Central Asia and China. The spider was, at one point, presumed extinct in Britain.

== Description ==
Alopecosa fabrilis is a large wolf spider. The males have a body which is 10 to 12 millimetres (0.39 to 0.47 in) long while the larger females have a body which is 11 to 14.7 millimetres (0.43 to 0.58 in) long. The largest females may attain a leg span of 5 centimetres (2.0 in). The prosoma is reddish-brown in colour and has obvious black stripes radiating from its centre with continuous horizontal stripes along the sides. The opisthosoma is marked with two pairs of distinct but small, round spots that are black in colour, one pair at the anterior end and the other in the middle.

== Distribution ==
Alopecosa fabrilis is a large species which lives at low population densities and is uncommon. It has been recorded from southern England and southern Scandinavia to Italy and the Balkans. It has also been recorded from the Russian Far East, Central Asia and China.

It was thought that the great fox spider could be found in three locations of heathland across the South of England. However, prior to 2020, the spider had not been recorded since the 1990s in Britain. It was re-discovered in October 2020 by Mike Waite of the Surrey Wildlife Trust, at a Ministry of Defence training site in the county.

== Habitat and biology ==
Alopecosa fabrilis is found on heathland, preferring dry sandy heaths, where it lives in a burrow created in sandy soil or underneath stones. It has been recorded in areas ploughed to create firebreaks but these are likely to refer to wandering individuals. For example, the habitat at Morden Heath in England was an area of open stony ground close to the summit of a hill and on the walls of gullies. These bare areas were partially the result of wartime military activities in the Second World War. The site in Surrey where they were rediscovered in 2020 is a military training area. Adults of both sexes have been recorded in September and October but it is thought likely that only the females over-winter. This species is a fast and agile nocturnal hunter. It uses its speed and agility to chase down beetles, ants and smaller spiders.
