= Alopecosa pictilis =

Scientific classification
- Domain: Eukaryota
- Kingdom: Animalia
- Phylum: Arthropoda
- Subphylum: Chelicerata
- Class: Arachnida
- Order: Araneae
- Infraorder: Araneomorphae
- Family: Lycosidae
- Genus: Alopecosa
- Species: A. pictilis

Binomial name
- Alopecosa pictilis (Emerton, 1885)

Species of spider

Alopecosa pictilis is a species of wolf spider in the family Lycosidae. It is found in North America and Russia (Siberia).
