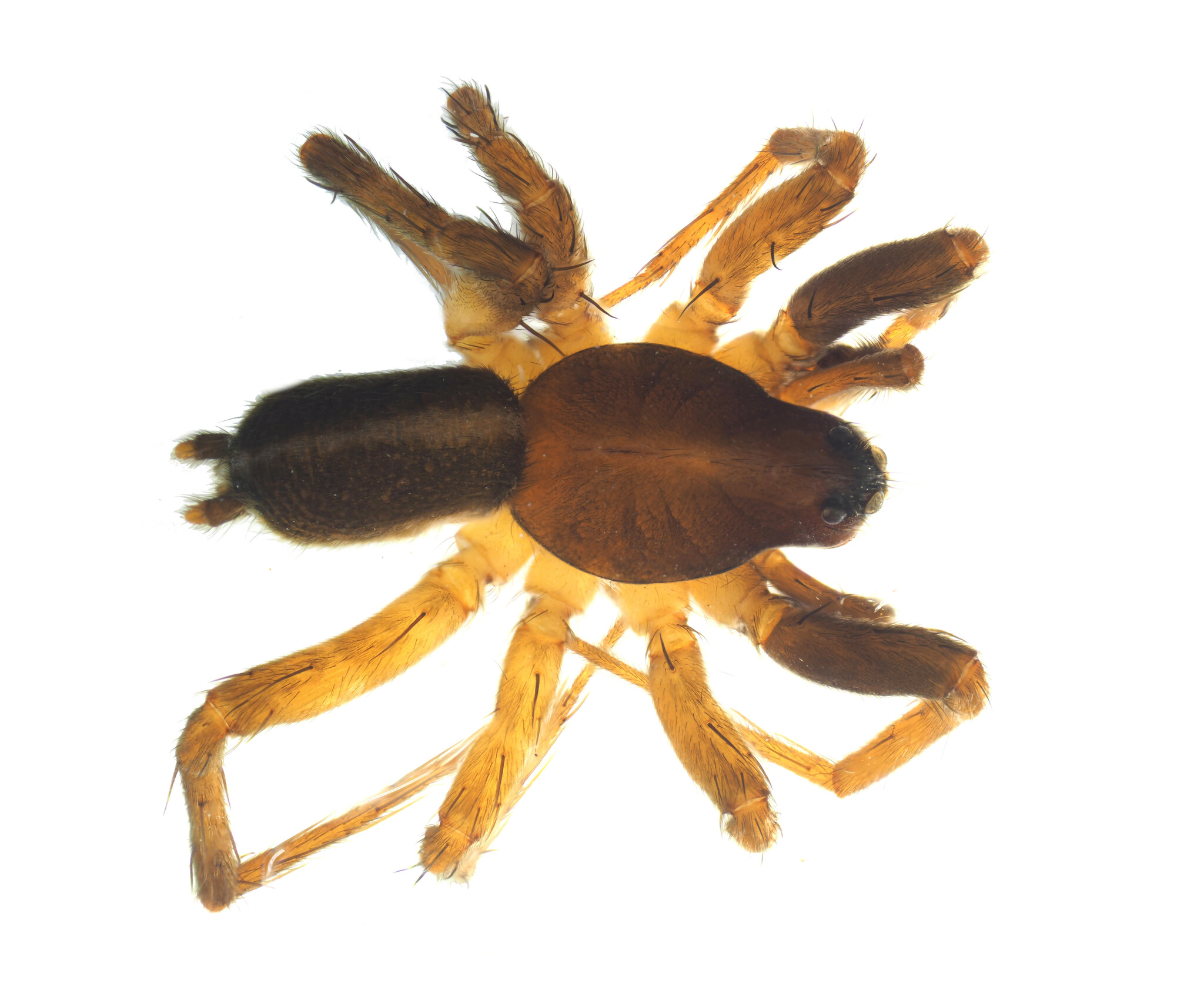

Scientific classification
- Kingdom: Animalia
- Phylum: Arthropoda
- Subphylum: Chelicerata
- Class: Arachnida
- Order: Araneae
- Infraorder: Araneomorphae
- Family: Lycosidae
- Genus: Anomalosa
- Species: A. kochi

Binomial name
- Anomalosa kochi (Simon, 1898)

Synonyms
- Anomalomma kochi

= Anomalosa kochi =

Species of spider

Anomalosa kochi is a species of spider in the wolf spider family Lycosidae. It was first described in 1898 by Eugène Simon as Anomalomma kochi. In 1960, it was transferred to the genus Anomalosa by Carl Friedrich Roewer.

It is endemic to Queensland and found both west and east of the Great Dividing Range.
