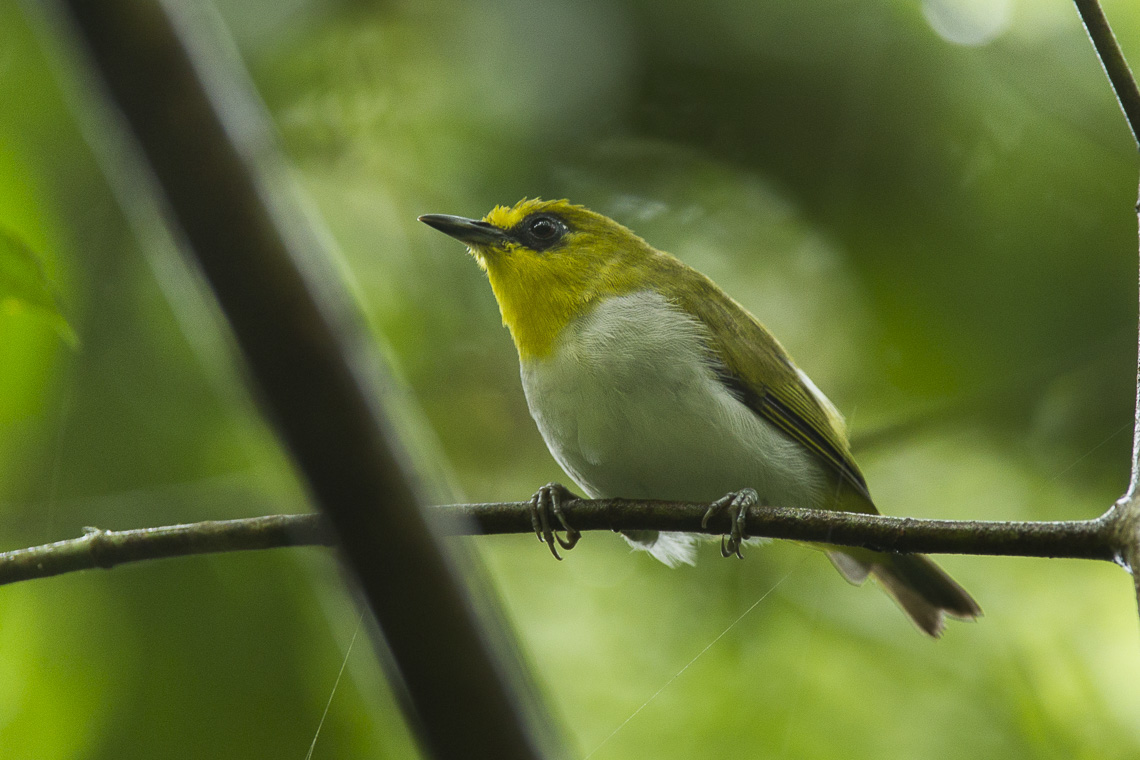

Conservation status
- Least Concern (IUCN 3.1)

Scientific classification
- Kingdom: Animalia
- Phylum: Chordata
- Class: Aves
- Order: Passeriformes
- Family: Zosteropidae
- Genus: Zosterops
- Species: Z. anomalus

Binomial name
- Zosterops anomalus Meyer & Wiglesworth, 1896

= Black-ringed white-eye =

Species of bird

The black-ringed white-eye or lemon-throated white-eye (Zosterops anomalus) is a species of bird in the family Zosteropidae. It is endemic to Sulawesi, Indonesia. Its natural habitat is subtropical or tropical moist lowland forests.

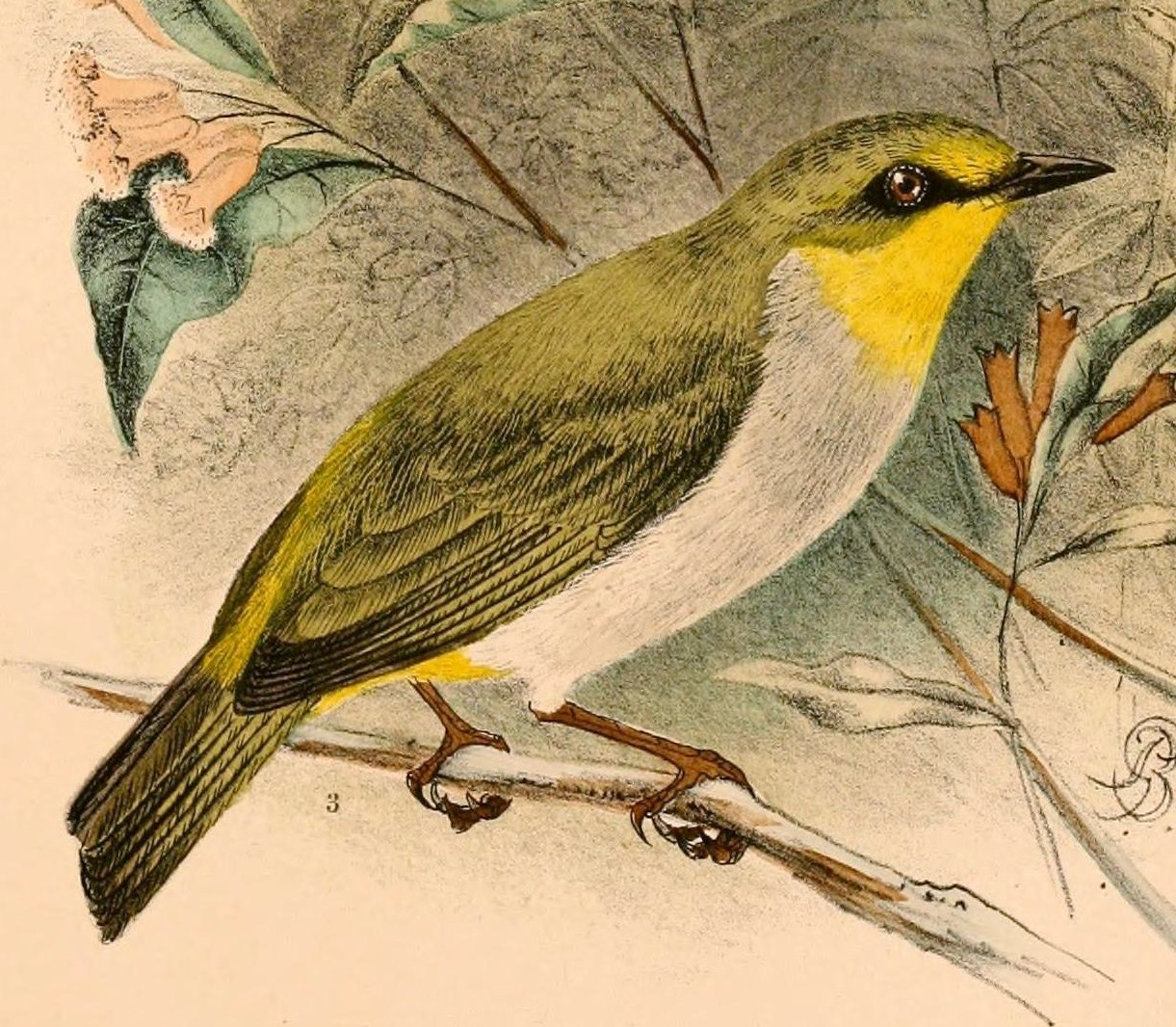
The nominate subspecies in Meyer & Wiglesworth (1898)
