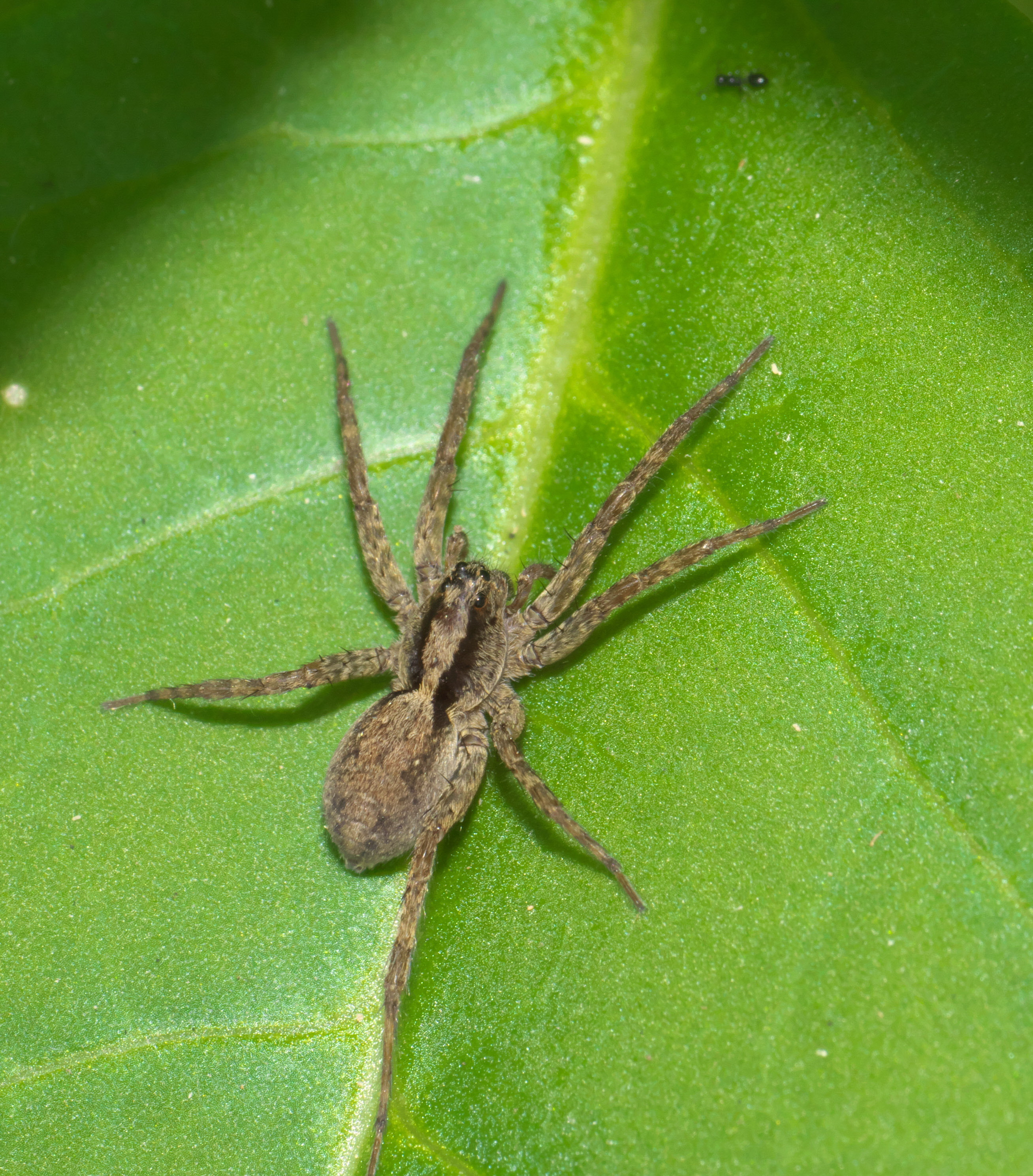

Conservation status
- Secure (NatureServe)

Scientific classification
- Kingdom: Animalia
- Phylum: Arthropoda
- Subphylum: Chelicerata
- Class: Arachnida
- Order: Araneae
- Infraorder: Araneomorphae
- Family: Lycosidae
- Genus: Alopecosa
- Species: A. kochi

Binomial name
- Alopecosa kochi Keyserling, 1877

Synonyms
- Tarentula kochii Keyserling, 1877; Lycosa brunneiventris Banks, 1894; Lycosa kochii Chamberlin, 1908; Alopecosa kochi Petrunkevitch, 1911; Pardosa heretica Chamberlin, 1925; Tarentula kochi Gertsch, 1934; Tarentula gertschi Schenkel, 1951; Lycosa jollensis Schenkel, 1951; Alopecosa gertschi Roewer, 1955; Jollecosa jollensis Roewer, 1955

= Alopecosa kochi =

Species of wolf spider

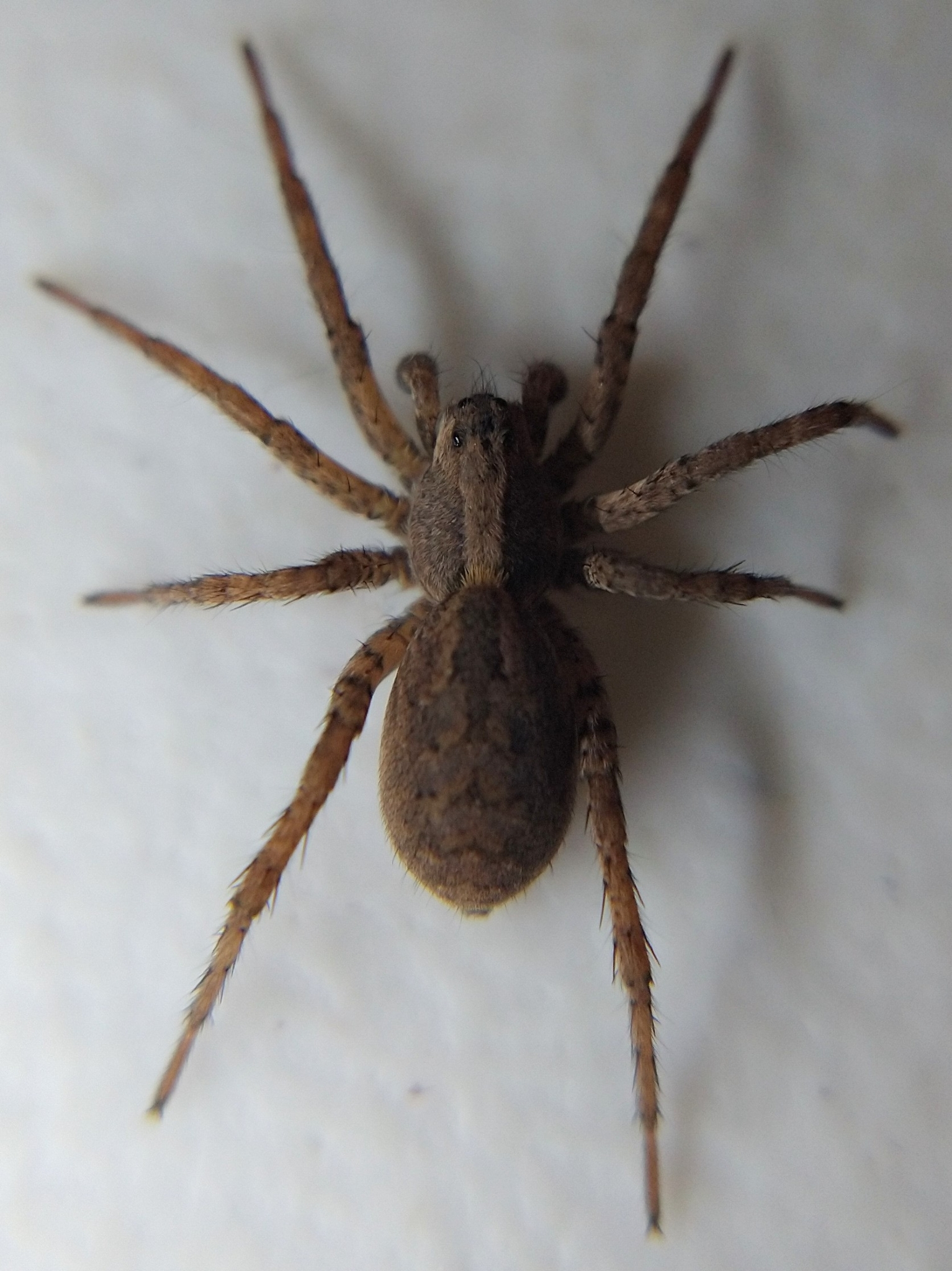
A. kochi

Alopecosa kochi is a species of wolf spider in the family Lycosidae. It is found in North America, including Canada, the United States, and Mexico. Sightings are most frequently recorded in March, with other occurrences during January, February, April, June, August, and December. From its consistent sightings across North America, it reveals a tolerance for both arid and temperate conditions. This species is part of the genus Alopecosa, a group known for active hunting behavior rather than web-building.

== Description ==
Alopecosa kochi is a medium-sized wolf spider, with adult body lengths ranging from 8–13 mm in body length. The body coloration is typically dark brown to grayish, with a prominent light-colored median stripe on the cephalothorax and a pale abdominal pattern bordered by darker bands. The legs are robust and slightly hairy, which assists in fast movement across the ground. Males are generally smaller and possess distinctive palpal organs used in reproduction. It also shows clear sexual dimorphism, meaning males and females differ in size and physical characteristics. Males, usually darker overall have a narrower abdomen and more defined banding on their legs. Additionally, the carapace is slightly elevated, giving more space for jaw muscles that's essential for predation. They also carry eight eyes that provides them great vision for hunting and navigation. Its compact body helps it run fast while chasing prey on open ground. A. kochi does not spin a capture web and instead uses silk mainly for egg sacs and retreats.

== Habitat and behavior ==
This species inhabits open and dry habitats, such as grasslands, forest edges, and sandy soils. Most A.kochi observations occur in outdoor settings. Occasionally, people can spot it indoors, likely when they seek shelter during colder months. The population remains fairly stable and like other wolf spiders. In California, A. kochi inhabits terrestrial environments including oak woodlands, chaparral, grasslands, and leaf litter. As a cursorial hunter, it does not spin a prey-capture web; instead, it actively pursues small invertebrates prey along the ground. Females carry their egg sacs attached to their spinnerets, and after hatching, spiderlings ride on the female’s back for several days. The species is often observed in temperate climates and is active during the daytime. Males travel widely to find mates, especially during warmer months. Males often die shortly after mating, while females may survive through the season. The timing of reproduction changes depending on seasons, but in warmer areas, the breeding period can last longer. They are a cursorial hunter, meaning they actively look for prey rather than waiting in a web. In a study with 17 document sightings, approximately 6% of cases noted the spider in or on a web, indicating that it more often hunts without relying on webs. These spiders are generally calm and solitary, but they can defend themselves if they feel threatened.

== Distribution ==
Alopecosa kochi has a wide distribution across North America, ranging from southern Canada through much of the United States and into northern Mexico. The species is listed in several regional and global databases, including the World Spider Catalog and the Integrated Taxonomic Information System (ITIS), confirming its presence in these regions.

== Diet ==
Alopecosa kochi mostly eats small insects, such as flies, beetles, and ants. It can sense movement with its eyes and sensory hairs, then quickly found over to its prey. They bite to inject venom, which paralyzes the insect, and then it digests its food. Predators of this species include birds, lizards, and larger spiders.

== Taxonomy ==
Alopecosa kochi was first described in 1877 by Austrian arachnologist Eugen von Keyserling who originally named it Tarentula kochii. Because of how difficult early spider taxonomy was due to limited specimen availability and morphological similarities, it was placed under several different generas before being reclassified into the name Alopecosa kochi by Petrunkevitch in 1911. Today, the genus "Alopecosa" currently includes more than 160 recognized species distributed globally, usually in open areas like grassland and rocky terrain.

Alopecosa kochi was originally described as Lycosa kochi by Keyserling (1877) before being reassigned to the genus Alopecosa. The current accepted classification follows the World Spider Catalog (2025).
