= Acartauchenius asiaticus =

Scientific classification
- Kingdom: Animalia
- Phylum: Arthropoda
- Subphylum: Chelicerata
- Class: Arachnida
- Order: Araneae
- Infraorder: Araneomorphae
- Family: Linyphiidae
- Genus: Acartauchenius
- Species: A. asiaticus

Binomial name
- Acartauchenius asiaticus (Tanasevitch, 1989)

Species of spider

Acartauchenius asiaticus is a species of sheet weaver found in Turkmenistan. It was described by Tanasevitch in 1989.
