= List of Araneidae genera =

As of November 2015, the World Spider Catalog accepted the following genera in the family Araneidae:

- Acacesia Simon, 1895
- Acantharachne Tullgren, 1910
- Acanthepeira Marx, 1883
- Acroaspis Karsch, 1878
- Acrosomoides Simon, 1887
- Actinacantha Simon, 1864
- Actinosoma Holmberg, 1883
- Aculepeira Chamberlin & Ivie, 1942
- Acusilas Simon, 1895
- Aethriscus Pocock, 1902
- Aethrodiscus Strand, 1913
- Aetrocantha Karsch, 1879
- Afracantha Dahl, 1914
- Agalenatea Archer, 1951
- Alenatea Song & Zhu, 1999
- Allocyclosa Levi, 1999
- Alpaida O. Pickard-Cambridge, 1889
- Amazonepeira Levi, 1989
- Anepsion Strand, 1929
- Arachnura Vinson, 1863
- Araneus Clerck, 1757
- Araniella Chamberlin & Ivie, 1942
- Aranoethra Butler, 1873
- Argiope Audouin, 1826
- Arkys Walckenaer, 1837
- Artonis Simon, 1895
- Aspidolasius Simon, 1887
- Augusta O. Pickard-Cambridge, 1877
- Austracantha Dahl, 1914
- Backobourkia Framenau et al., 2010
- Bertrana Keyserling, 1884
- Caerostris Thorell, 1868
- Carepalxis L. Koch, 1872
- Celaenia Thorell, 1868
- Cercidia Thorell, 1869
- Chorizopes O. Pickard-Cambridge, 1870
- Cladomelea Simon, 1895
- Cnodalia Thorell, 1890
- Coelossia Simon, 1895
- Colaranea Court & Forster, 1988
- Collina Urquhart, 1891
- Colphepeira Archer, 1941
- Cryptaranea Court & Forster, 1988
- Cyclosa Menge, 1866
- Cyphalonotus Simon, 1895
- Cyrtarachne Thorell, 1868
- Cyrtobill Framenau & Scharff, 2009
- Cyrtophora Simon, 1864
- Deione Thorell, 1898
- Deliochus Simon, 1894
- Demadiana Strand, 1929
- Dolophones Walckenaer, 1837
- Dubiepeira Levi, 1991
- Edricus O. Pickard-Cambridge, 1890
- Enacrosoma Mello-Leitão, 1932
- Encyosaccus Simon, 1895
- Epeiroides Keyserling, 1885
- Eriophora Simon, 1864
- Eriovixia Archer, 1951
- Eustacesia Caporiacco, 1954
- Eustala Simon, 1895
- Exechocentrus Simon, 1889
- Faradja Grasshoff, 1970
- Friula O. Pickard-Cambridge, 1896
- Galaporella Levi, 2009
- Gasteracantha Sundevall, 1833
- Gastroxya Benoit, 1962
- Gea C. L. Koch, 1843
- Gibbaranea Archer, 1951
- Glyptogona Simon, 1884
- Heterognatha Nicolet, 1849
- Heurodes Keyserling, 1886
- Hingstepeira Levi, 1995
- Hypognatha Guérin, 1839
- Hypsacantha Dahl, 1914
- Hypsosinga Ausserer, 1871
- Ideocaira Simon, 1903
- Isoxya Simon, 1885
- Kaira O. Pickard-Cambridge, 1889
- Kapogea Levi, 1997
- Kilima Grasshoff, 1970
- Larinia Simon, 1874
- Lariniaria Grasshoff, 1970
- Larinioides Caporiacco, 1934
- Leviellus Wunderlich, 2004
- Lewisepeira Levi, 1993
- Lipocrea Thorell, 1878
- Macracantha Simon, 1864
- Madacantha Emerit, 1970
- Mahembea Grasshoff, 1970
- Mangora O. Pickard-Cambridge, 1889
- Manogea Levi, 1997
- Mastophora Holmberg, 1876
- Mecynogea Simon, 1903
- Megaraneus Lawrence, 1968
- Melychiopharis Simon, 1895
- Metazygia F. O. Pickard-Cambridge, 1904
- Metepeira F. O. Pickard-Cambridge, 1903
- Micrathena Sundevall, 1833
- Micrepeira Schenkel, 1953
- Micropoltys Kulczy?ski, 1911
- Milonia Thorell, 1890
- Molinaranea Mello-Leitão, 1940
- Nemoscolus Simon, 1895
- Nemosinga Caporiacco, 1947
- Nemospiza Simon, 1903
- Neogea Levi, 1983
- Neoscona Simon, 1864
- Nicolepeira Levi, 2001
- Novakiella Court & Forster, 1993
- Novaranea Court & Forster, 1988
- Nuctenea Simon, 1864
- Ocrepeira Marx, 1883
- Ordgarius Keyserling, 1886
- Paralarinia Grasshoff, 1970
- Paraplectana Brito Capello, 1867
- Paraplectanoides Keyserling, 1886
- Pararaneus Caporiacco, 1940
- Parawixia F. O. Pickard-Cambridge, 1904
- Parazygiella Wunderlich, 2004
- Parmatergus Emerit, 1994
- Pasilobus Simon, 1895
- Perilla Thorell, 1895
- Pherenice Thorell, 1899
- Phonognatha Simon, 1894
- Pitharatus Simon, 1895
- Plebs Joseph & Framenau, 2012
- Poecilarcys Simon, 1895
- Poecilopachys Simon, 1895
- Poltys C. L. Koch, 1843
- Porcataraneus Mi & Peng, 2011
- Pozonia Schenkel, 1953
- Prasonica Simon, 1895
- Prasonicella Grasshoff, 1971
- Pronoides Schenkel, 1936
- Pronous Keyserling, 1881
- Pseudartonis Simon, 1903
- Pseudopsyllo Strand, 1916
- Psyllo Thorell, 1899
- Pycnacantha Blackwall, 1865
- Rubrepeira Levi, 1992
- Scoloderus Simon, 1887
- Sedasta Simon, 1894
- Singa C. L. Koch, 1836
- Singafrotypa Benoit, 1962
- Siwa Grasshoff, 1970
- Spilasma Simon, 1897
- Spinepeira Levi, 1995
- Spintharidius Simon, 1893
- Stroemiellus Wunderlich, 2004
- Taczanowskia Keyserling, 1879
- Talthybia Thorell, 1898
- Tatepeira Levi, 1995
- Telaprocera Harmer & Framenau, 2008
- Testudinaria Taczanowski, 1879
- Thelacantha Hasselt, 1882
- Thorellina Berg, 1899
- Togacantha Dahl, 1914
- Umbonata Grasshoff, 1971
- Ursa Simon, 1895
- Verrucosa McCook, 1888
- Wagneriana F. O. Pickard-Cambridge, 1904
- Witica O. Pickard-Cambridge, 1895
- Wixia O. Pickard-Cambridge, 1882
- Xylethrus Simon, 1895
- Yaginumia Archer, 1960
- Zealaranea Court & Forster, 1988
- Zilla C. L. Koch, 1834
- Zygiella F. O. Pickard-Cambridge, 1902
