= Tatepeira =

Scientific classification
- Kingdom: Animalia
- Phylum: Arthropoda
- Subphylum: Chelicerata
- Class: Arachnida
- Order: Araneae
- Infraorder: Araneomorphae
- Family: Araneidae
- Genus: Tatepeira; Levi, 1995

Type species
- T. tatarendensis (Tullgren, 1905)

Species
- 4, see text

Genus of spiders

Tatepeira is a genus of Central and South American orb-weaver spiders first described by Herbert Walter Levi in 1995.

== Species ==
As of April 2019 it contains four species:

- Tatepeira carrolli Levi, 1995 – Colombia
- Tatepeira itu Levi, 1995 – Brazil
- Tatepeira stadelmani Levi, 1995 – Honduras
- Tatepeira tatarendensis (Tullgren, 1905) (type) – Colombia to Bolivia
