= Heurodes =

Obsolete genus of spiders

Heurodes was a genus of orb-weaver spiders first described by Eugen von Keyserling in 1886. It previously contained three species, Heurodes fratrellus and Heurodes turritus, both now considered nomen dubium, and Heurodes porcula, now considered a synonym of Eriovixia porcula (Simon, 1877)
