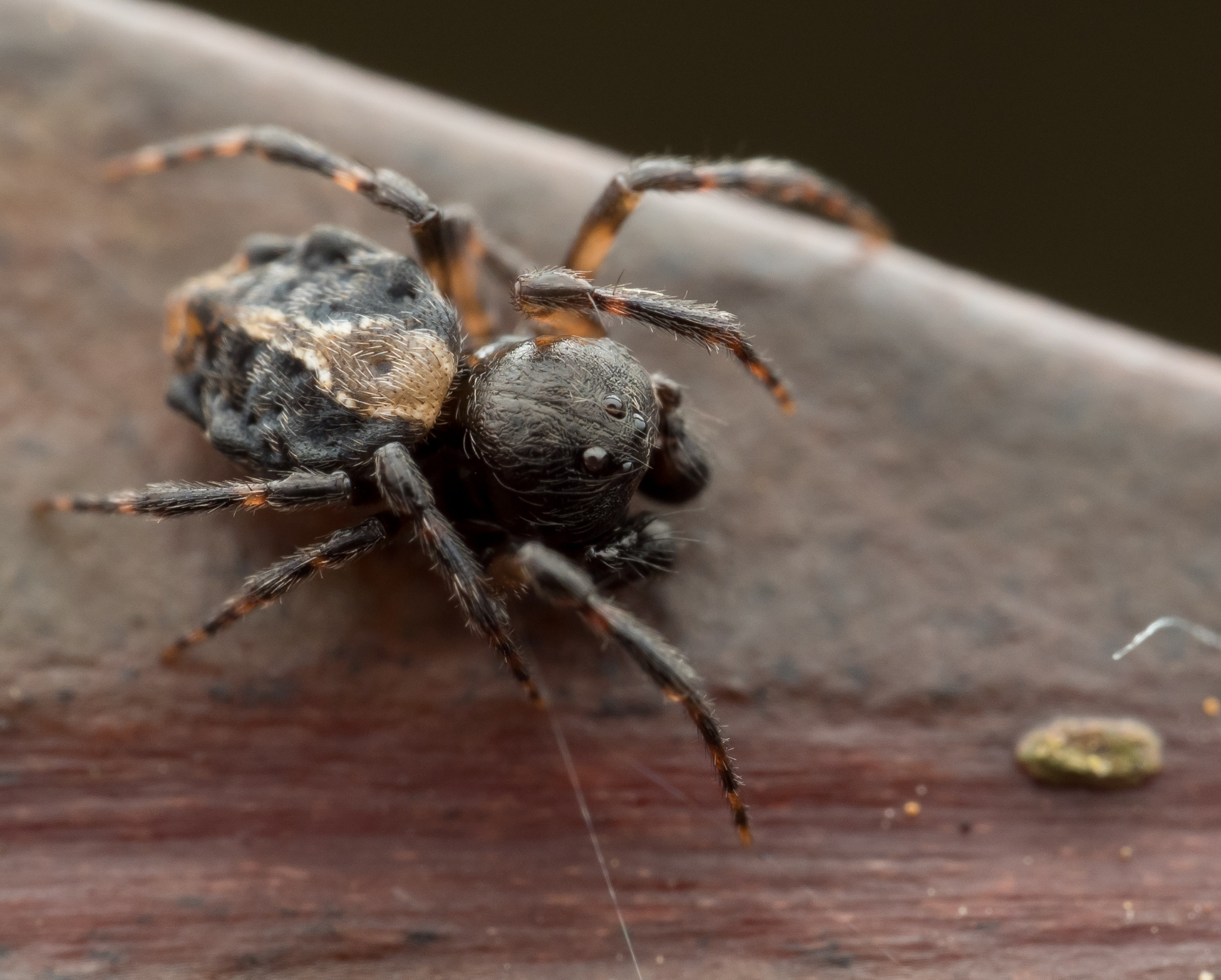
- Chorizopesoides annasestakovae

Scientific classification
- Kingdom: Animalia
- Phylum: Arthropoda
- Subphylum: Chelicerata
- Class: Arachnida
- Order: Araneae
- Infraorder: Araneomorphae
- Family: Araneidae
- Genus: Chorizopesoides; Mi & Wang, 2018

Type species
- Chorizopes wulingensis (Yin, Wang & Xie, 1994)

= Chorizopesoides =

Genus of spiders

Chorizopesoides is a genus of orb-weaver spiders erected by X. Q. Mi & C. Wang in 2018.

== Species ==
The following species are recognised in the genus Chorizopesoides::

- Chorizopesoides annasestakovae Mi & Li, 2021 — China
- Chorizopesoides guoi Mi & Li, 2021 — China
- Chorizopesoides orientalis (Simon, 1909) — India, China, Vietnam
- Chorizopesoides shimoga Dutta, Sudhin, Sen & Banerjee, 2026 — India
- Chorizopesoides wulignensis (Yin, Wang & Xie, 1994) — China
