= Lewisepeira =

Scientific classification
- Kingdom: Animalia
- Phylum: Arthropoda
- Subphylum: Chelicerata
- Class: Arachnida
- Order: Araneae
- Infraorder: Araneomorphae
- Family: Araneidae
- Genus: Lewisepeira; Levi, 1993

Type species
- L. farri (Archer, 1958)

Species
- 4, see text

Genus of spiders

Lewisepeira is a genus of orb-weaver spiders first described by Herbert Walter Levi in 1993.

== Species ==
As of November 2026 it contains four species from the Americas and the Caribbean:

- Lewisepeira boquete Levi, 1993 – Panama
- Lewisepeira chichinautzin Levi, 1993 – Mexico
- Lewisepeira farri (Archer, 1958) – Jamaica
- Lewisepeira maricao Levi, 1993 – Puerto Rico
