= Osmooka =

Scientific classification
- Kingdom: Animalia
- Phylum: Arthropoda
- Subphylum: Chelicerata
- Class: Arachnida
- Order: Araneae
- Infraorder: Araneomorphae
- Family: Araneidae
- Genus: Osmooka; Kuntner, Yu & Bond, 2025
- Species: O. aphana

Binomial name
- Osmooka aphana Kuntner, Yu, Bedjanič, Gregorič & Bond, 2025

Species of spider

Osmooka is a monotypic genus of spiders in the family Araneidae containing the single species, Osmooka aphana.

== Distribution ==
Osmooka aphana is endemic to Madagascar.
