= Tangaraneus =

Scientific classification
- Kingdom: Animalia
- Phylum: Arthropoda
- Subphylum: Chelicerata
- Class: Arachnida
- Order: Araneae
- Infraorder: Araneomorphae
- Family: Araneidae
- Genus: Tangaraneus; Mi, Wang & Li, 2024
- Species: T. geqian

Binomial name
- Tangaraneus geqian Mi, Wang & Li, 2024

Species of spider

Tangaraneus is a monotypic genus of spiders in the family Araneidae containing the single species, Tangaraneus geqian.

== Distribution ==
Tangaraneus geqian has been recorded from Xishuangbanna in Yunnan province, China.

== Etymology ==
The genus is named after Chinese arachnologist Guo Tang (Chinese: 唐果; pinyin: Táng guǒ) in combination with the related genus Araneus. The species is named after the song Chinese: 擱淺; pinyin: Gēqiǎn ("step aside") by Taiwanese singer Jay Chou.
