= Neogea =

Scientific classification
- Kingdom: Animalia
- Phylum: Arthropoda
- Subphylum: Chelicerata
- Class: Arachnida
- Order: Araneae
- Infraorder: Araneomorphae
- Family: Araneidae
- Genus: Neogea; Levi, 1983

Type species
- N. egregia (Kulczyński, 1911)

Species
- N. egregia (Kulczyński, 1911) – New Guinea; N. nocticolor (Thorell, 1887) – India, Myanmar, China, Peninsular Malaysia, Singapore, Sumatra; N. yunnanensis Yin, Wang, Xie & Peng, 1990 – China

Genus of spiders

Neogea is a genus of orb-weaver spiders first described by Herbert Walter Levi in 1983. As of November 2026 it contains only three species.
