= Nicolepeira =

Scientific classification
- Kingdom: Animalia
- Phylum: Arthropoda
- Subphylum: Chelicerata
- Class: Arachnida
- Order: Araneae
- Infraorder: Araneomorphae
- Family: Araneidae
- Genus: Nicolepeira; Levi, 2001

Type species
- N. flavifrons (Nicolet, 1849)

Species
- N. bicaudata (Nicolet, 1849) – Chile; N. flavifrons (Nicolet, 1849) – Chile; N. transversalis (Nicolet, 1849) – Chile

Genus of spiders

Nicolepeira is a genus of South American orb-weaver spiders first described by Herbert Walter Levi in 2001. As of November 2026 it contains only three species, all found in Chile.
