= Pengaraneus =

Scientific classification
- Kingdom: Animalia
- Phylum: Arthropoda
- Subphylum: Chelicerata
- Class: Arachnida
- Order: Araneae
- Infraorder: Araneomorphae
- Family: Araneidae
- Genus: Pengaraneus; Mi, Wang & Li, 2024
- Species: P. qingtian

Binomial name
- Pengaraneus qingtian Mi, Wang & Li, 2024

Species of spider

Pengaraneus is a monotypic genus of spiders in the family Araneidae containing the single species, Pengaraneus qingtian.

== Distribution ==
Pengaraneus qingtian has been recorded from Xishuangbanna in Yunnan province, China.

== Etymology ==
The genus is named after Chinese arachnologist species:Xian-Jin Peng, combined with the related genus name Araneus. The species name refers to the song Chinese: 晴天; pinyin: Qíngtiān ("sunny day") by Taiwanese singer Jay Chou.

== External sources ==
- Youtube: 周杰倫 Jay Chou【晴天 Sunny Day】- Official Music Video
