= Dubiepeira =

Scientific classification
- Kingdom: Animalia
- Phylum: Arthropoda
- Subphylum: Chelicerata
- Class: Arachnida
- Order: Araneae
- Infraorder: Araneomorphae
- Family: Araneidae
- Genus: Dubiepeira; Levi, 1991

Type species
- D. dubitata (Soares & Camargo, 1948)

Species
- 5, see text

Genus of spiders

Dubiepeira is a genus of South American orb-weaver spiders first described by Herbert Walter Levi in 1991.

== Species ==
As of November 2026 it contains five species:

- Dubiepeira amablemaria Levi, 1991 – Peru
- Dubiepeira amacayacu Levi, 1991 – Colombia, Peru, Brazil
- Dubiepeira dubitata (Soares & Camargo, 1948) – Venezuela to Brazil
- Dubiepeira lamolina Levi, 1991 – Ecuador, Peru
- Dubiepeira neptunina (Mello-Leitão, 1948) – Colombia, Peru, Guyana, French Guiana
