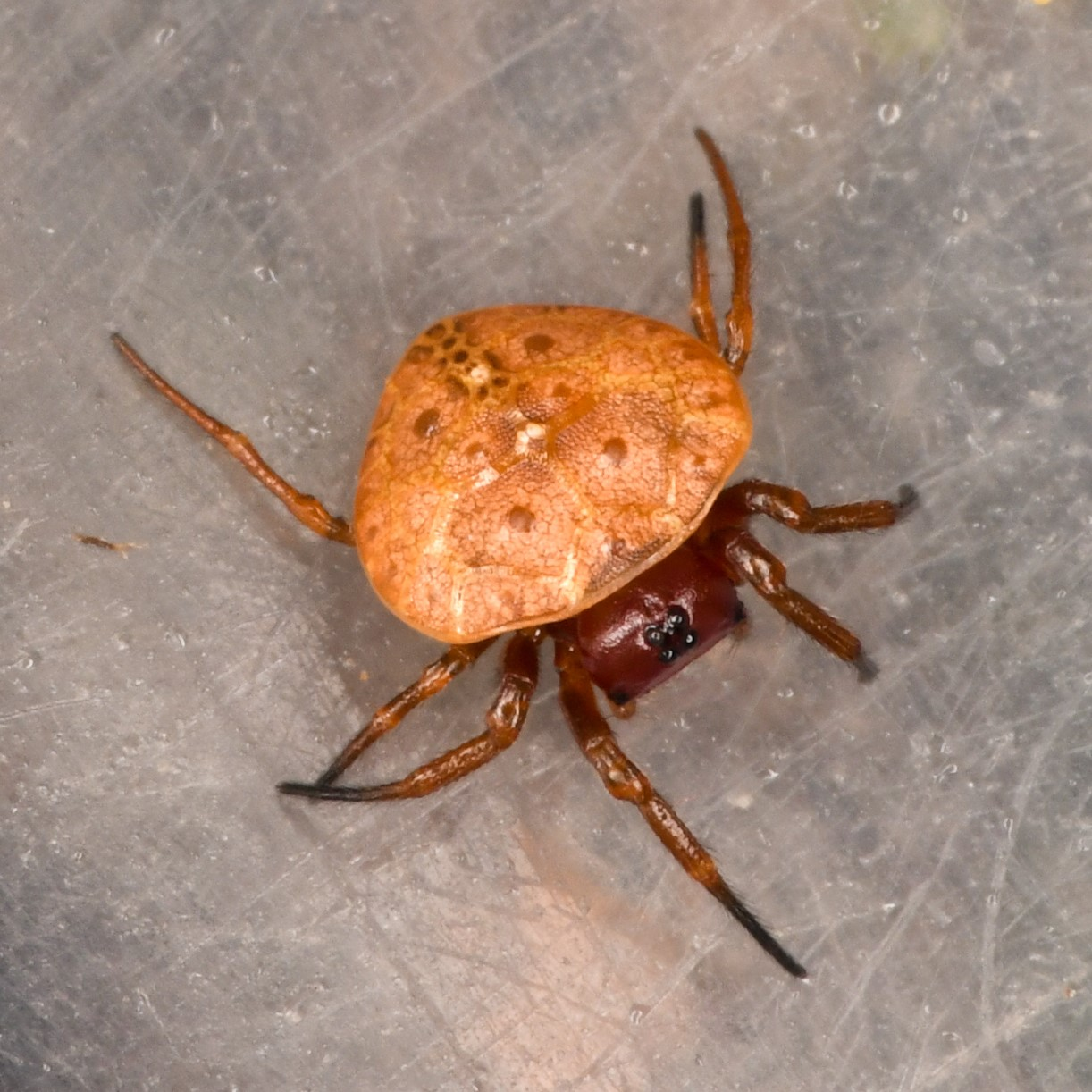
- Hypognatha elaborata

Scientific classification
- Kingdom: Animalia
- Phylum: Arthropoda
- Subphylum: Chelicerata
- Class: Arachnida
- Order: Araneae
- Infraorder: Araneomorphae
- Family: Araneidae
- Genus: Hypognatha; Guérin, 1839

Type species
- H. scutata (Perty, 1833)

Species
- 38, see text

= Hypognatha =

Genus of spiders

Hypognatha is a genus of orb-weaver spiders first described by F. E. Guérin-Méneville in 1839.

== Species ==
As of November 2026 it contains thirty-eight species:

- Hypognatha alho Levi, 1996 – Brazil
- Hypognatha belem Levi, 1996 – Brazil
- Hypognatha cacau Levi, 1996 – Peru, Brazil
- Hypognatha cambara Levi, 1996 – Brazil
- Hypognatha carpish Levi, 1996 – Peru
- Hypognatha colosso Levi, 1996 – Colombia, Brazil
- Hypognatha coyo Levi, 1996 – Colombia
- Hypognatha cryptocephala Mello-Leitão, 1947 – Brazil
- Hypognatha deplanata (Taczanowski, 1873) – Brazil, French Guiana
- Hypognatha divuca Levi, 1996 – Peru
- Hypognatha elaborata Chickering, 1953 – Costa Rica, Panama, Colombia
- Hypognatha furcifera (O. Pickard-Cambridge, 1881) – Brazil
- Hypognatha ica Levi, 1996 – Colombia, Brazil
- Hypognatha ituara Levi, 1996 – Brazil
- Hypognatha jacaze Levi, 1996 – Brazil
- Hypognatha janauari Levi, 1996 – Brazil
- Hypognatha lagoas Levi, 1996 – Brazil
- Hypognatha lamoka Levi, 1996 – Venezuela
- Hypognatha maranon Levi, 1996 – Peru
- Hypognatha maria Levi, 1996 – Peru
- Hypognatha matisia Levi, 1996 – Peru
- Hypognatha mirandaribeiroi Soares & Camargo, 1948 – Brazil
- Hypognatha mozamba Levi, 1996 – Colombia, Ecuador, Peru, Brazil
- Hypognatha nasuta O. Pickard-Cambridge, 1896 – Mexico
- Hypognatha navio Levi, 1996 – Venezuela, Brazil
- Hypognatha pereiroi Levi, 1996 – Brazil
- Hypognatha putumayo Levi, 1996 – Colombia, Ecuador
- Hypognatha rancho Levi, 1996 – Venezuela
- Hypognatha saut Levi, 1996 – French Guiana
- Hypognatha scutata (Perty, 1833) – Trinidad to Argentina
- Hypognatha solimoes Levi, 1996 – Brazil
- Hypognatha tampo Levi, 1996 – Peru
- Hypognatha testudinaria (Taczanowski, 1879) – Peru
- Hypognatha tingo Levi, 1996 – Peru
- Hypognatha tocantins Levi, 1996 – Brazil
- Hypognatha triunfo Levi, 1996 – Brazil
- Hypognatha utari Levi, 1996 – Brazil
- Hypognatha viamao Levi, 1996 – Brazil
