= Lariniophora =

Scientific classification
- Kingdom: Animalia
- Phylum: Arthropoda
- Subphylum: Chelicerata
- Class: Arachnida
- Order: Araneae
- Infraorder: Araneomorphae
- Family: Araneidae
- Genus: Lariniophora; Framenau, 2011
- Species: L. ragnhildae

Binomial name
- Lariniophora ragnhildae Framenau, 2011

Genus of spiders

Lariniophora is a genus of orb-weaver spiders containing a single species, Lariniophora ragnhildae. It was first described by V. W. Framenau in 2011 and is only found in Australia.
