= Micropoltys =

Scientific classification
- Kingdom: Animalia
- Phylum: Arthropoda
- Subphylum: Chelicerata
- Class: Arachnida
- Order: Araneae
- Infraorder: Araneomorphae
- Family: Araneidae
- Genus: Micropoltys; Kulczyński, 1911

Type species
- M. placenta Kulczyński, 1911

Species
- 4, see text

Genus of spiders

Micropoltys is a genus of South Pacific orb-weaver spiders first described by Władysław Kulczyński in 1911.

== Species ==
As of November 2026 it contains four species:

- Micropoltys baitetensis Smith & Levi, 2010 – New Guinea
- Micropoltys debakkeri Smith & Levi, 2010 – New Guinea, Australia (Queensland)
- Micropoltys heatherae Smith & Levi, 2010 – Australia (Queensland)
- Micropoltys placenta Kulczyński, 1911 – New Guinea
