= Micrepeira =

Scientific classification
- Kingdom: Animalia
- Phylum: Arthropoda
- Subphylum: Chelicerata
- Class: Arachnida
- Order: Araneae
- Infraorder: Araneomorphae
- Family: Araneidae
- Genus: Micrepeira; Schenkel, 1953

Type species
- M. albomaculata Schenkel, 1953

Species
- 7, see text

Genus of spiders

Micrepeira is a genus of orb-weaver spiders first described by E. Schenkel in 1953.

== Species ==
As of November 2026 it contains seven species:

- Micrepeira albomaculata Schenkel, 1953 – Venezuela
- Micrepeira fowleri Levi, 1995 – Colombia, Ecuador, Peru, Brazil
- Micrepeira hoeferi Levi, 1995 – Peru, Brazil, French Guiana, Colombia
- Micrepeira pachitea Levi, 1995 – Peru
- Micrepeira smithae Levi, 1995 – Suriname
- Micrepeira tubulofaciens (Hingston, 1932) – Colombia, Guyana, French Guiana
- Micrepeira velso Levi, 1995 – Costa Rica
