= Hingstepeira =

Scientific classification
- Kingdom: Animalia
- Phylum: Arthropoda
- Subphylum: Chelicerata
- Class: Arachnida
- Order: Araneae
- Infraorder: Araneomorphae
- Family: Araneidae
- Genus: Hingstepeira; Levi, 1995

Type species
- H. folisecens (Hingston, 1932)

Species
- 4, see text

Genus of spiders

Hingstepeira is a genus of South American orb-weaver spiders first described by Herbert Walter Levi in 1995.

== Species ==
As of November 2026 it contains four species:

- Hingstepeira arnolisei Levi, 1995 – Brazil
- Hingstepeira dimona Levi, 1995 – Brazil
- Hingstepeira folisecens (Hingston, 1932) – Colombia, Brazil, Guyana, Suriname, French Guiana
- Hingstepeira isherton Levi, 1995 – Guyana
