= Porcataraneus =

Scientific classification
- Domain: Eukaryota
- Kingdom: Animalia
- Phylum: Arthropoda
- Subphylum: Chelicerata
- Class: Arachnida
- Order: Araneae
- Infraorder: Araneomorphae
- Family: Araneidae
- Genus: Porcataraneus; Mi & Peng, 2011

Type species
- P. cruciatus Mi & Peng, 2011

Species
- P. bengalensis (Tikader, 1975) – India, China; P. cruciatus Mi & Peng, 2011 – China; P. nanshanensis (Yin, Wang, Xie & Peng, 1990) – China

Genus of spiders

Porcataraneus is a genus of Asian orb-weaver spiders first described by X. Q. Mi & X. J. Peng in 2011. As of April 2019 it contains only three species from India and China.
