= Deliochus =

Scientific classification
- Kingdom: Animalia
- Phylum: Arthropoda
- Subphylum: Chelicerata
- Class: Arachnida
- Order: Araneae
- Infraorder: Araneomorphae
- Family: Araneidae
- Genus: Deliochus; Simon, 1894

Type species
- D. zelivira (Keyserling, 1887)

Species
- 5, see text

Genus of spiders

Deliochus is a genus of South Pacific orb-weaver spiders first described by Eugène Simon in 1895.

== Species ==
As of November 2026 it contains five species:

- Deliochus humilis (L. Koch, 1867) – Australia, Papua New Guinea
- Deliochus idoneus (Keyserling, 1887) – Queensland, New South Wales, Tasmania, Western Australia
- Deliochus pulchra Rainbow, 1916 – Queensland
  - Deliochus p. melanius Rainbow, 1916 – Queensland
- Deliochus zelivira (Keyserling, 1887) – Australia, Tasmania
