= Milonia =

Scientific classification
- Kingdom: Animalia
- Phylum: Arthropoda
- Subphylum: Chelicerata
- Class: Arachnida
- Order: Araneae
- Infraorder: Araneomorphae
- Family: Araneidae
- Genus: Milonia; Thorell, 1890

Type species
- M. brevipes Thorell, 1890

Species
- 8, see text

Genus of spiders

Milonia is a genus of Southeast Asian orb-weaver spiders first described by Tamerlan Thorell in 1890.

== Species ==
As of November 2026 it contains eight species:

- Milonia albula O. Pickard-Cambridge, 1899 – Singapore
- Milonia brevipes Thorell, 1890 – Sumatra
- Milonia gemella Mi & Li, 2021 – China
- Milonia hexastigma (Hasselt, 1882) – Sumatra
- Milonia obtusa Thorell, 1892 – Singapore
- Milonia singaeformis (Hasselt, 1882) – Sumatra
- Milonia tomosceles Thorell, 1895 – Myanmar
- Milonia trifasciata Thorell, 1890 – Java, Borneo
