= Prasonicella =

Scientific classification
- Kingdom: Animalia
- Phylum: Arthropoda
- Subphylum: Chelicerata
- Class: Arachnida
- Order: Araneae
- Infraorder: Araneomorphae
- Family: Araneidae
- Genus: Prasonicella; Grasshoff, 1971

Type species
- P. cavipalpis Grasshoff, 1971

Species
- P. cavipalpis Grasshoff, 1971 – Madagascar; P. marsa Roberts, 1983 – Seychelles (Aldabra)

Genus of spiders

Prasonicella is a genus of East African orb-weaver spiders first described by M. Grasshoff in 1971. As of April 2019 it contains only two species.
