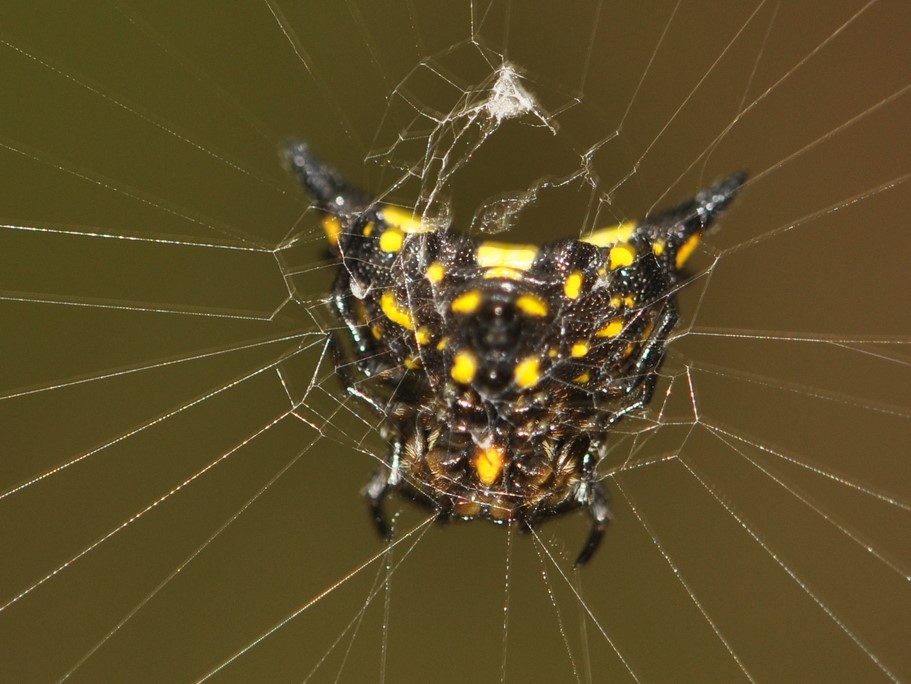
- Acrosomoides acrosomoides
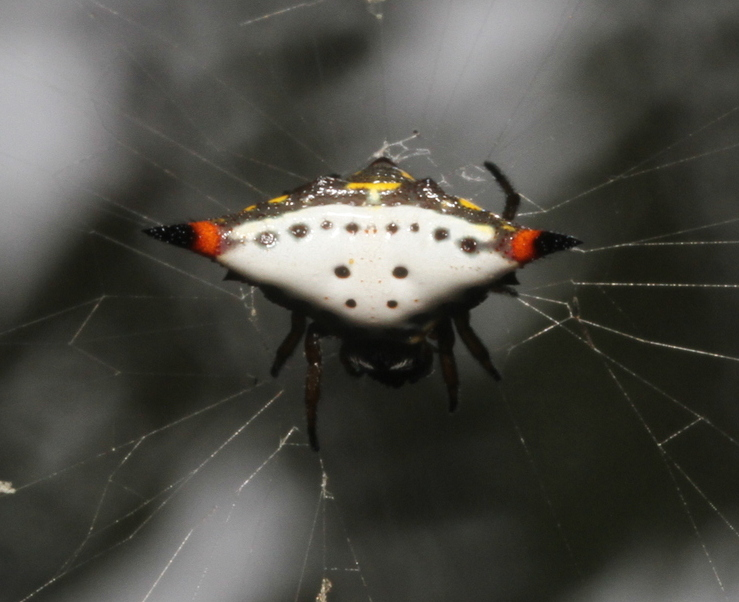
- A. acrosomoides in Madagascar

Scientific classification
- Kingdom: Animalia
- Phylum: Arthropoda
- Subphylum: Chelicerata
- Class: Arachnida
- Order: Araneae
- Infraorder: Araneomorphae
- Family: Araneidae
- Genus: Acrosomoides; Simon, 1887

Type species
- A. linnaei (Walckenaer, 1841)

= Acrosomoides =

Genus of spiders

Acrosomoides is a genus of African orb-weaver spiders first described by Eugène Simon in 1887.

== Species ==
As of October 2026, this genus includes three species:

- Acrosomoides acrosomoides (O. Pickard-Cambridge, 1879) – Madagascar
- Acrosomoides linnaei (Walckenaer, 1841) – West, Central, East Africa
- Acrosomoides tetraedra (Walckenaer, 1841) – Cameroon, DR Congo

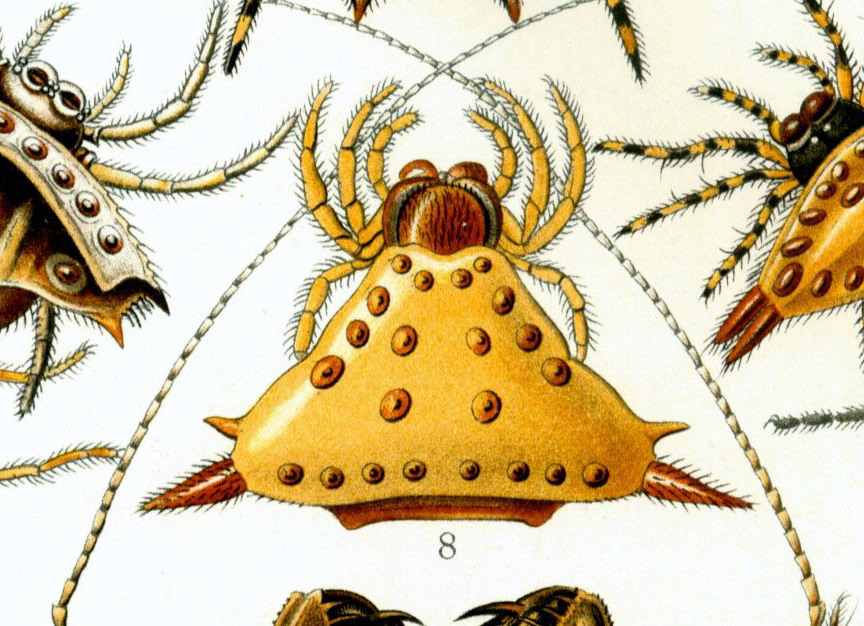
A. acrosomoides drawn by Ernst Haeckel
