= Spintharidius =

Scientific classification
- Kingdom: Animalia
- Phylum: Arthropoda
- Subphylum: Chelicerata
- Class: Arachnida
- Order: Araneae
- Infraorder: Araneomorphae
- Family: Araneidae
- Genus: Spintharidius; Simon, 1893

Type species
- S. rhomboidalis Simon, 1893

Species
- S. rhomboidalis Simon, 1893 – Brazil, Peru, Bolivia, Paraguay; S. viridis Franganillo, 1926 – Cuba

Synonyms
- Madrepeira Levi, 1995

Genus of spiders

Spintharidius is a genus of orb-weaver spiders first described by Eugène Simon in 1893. As of April 2019 it contains only two species found in South America and the Caribbean.
