= Paraplectanoides =

Scientific classification
- Kingdom: Animalia
- Phylum: Arthropoda
- Subphylum: Chelicerata
- Class: Arachnida
- Order: Araneae
- Infraorder: Araneomorphae
- Family: Araneidae
- Genus: Paraplectanoides; Keyserling, 1886

Type species
- P. crassipes Keyserling, 1886

Species
- P. crassipes Keyserling, 1886 – Western Australia, Queensland, New South Wales, Tasmania

Genus of spiders

Paraplectanoides is a genus of Australian orb-weaver spiders first described by Eugen von Keyserling in 1886. As of November 2026 it contains only one species.
