= Parmatergus =

Scientific classification
- Domain: Eukaryota
- Kingdom: Animalia
- Phylum: Arthropoda
- Subphylum: Chelicerata
- Class: Arachnida
- Order: Araneae
- Infraorder: Araneomorphae
- Family: Araneidae
- Genus: Parmatergus; Emerit, 1994

Type species
- P. coccinelloides Emerit, 1994

Species
- P. coccinelloides Emerit, 1994 – Madagascar; P. coccinelloides Emerit, 1994 – Madagascar; P. lens Emerit, 1994 – Madagascar

Genus of spiders

Parmatergus is a genus of East African orb-weaver spiders first described by M. Emerit in 1994. As of April 2019 it contains only three species, all found in Madagascar.
