= Psyllo =

Scientific classification
- Kingdom: Animalia
- Phylum: Arthropoda
- Subphylum: Chelicerata
- Class: Arachnida
- Order: Araneae
- Infraorder: Araneomorphae
- Family: Araneidae
- Genus: Psyllo; Thorell, 1899
- Species: P. nitida

Binomial name
- Psyllo nitida Thorell, 1899

Genus of spiders

Psyllo is a genus of Central African orb-weaver spiders containing the single species, Psyllo nitida. It was first described by Tamerlan Thorell in 1899, and has only been found in Cameroon and the Democratic Republic of the Congo.
