= Coelossia =

Scientific classification
- Kingdom: Animalia
- Phylum: Arthropoda
- Subphylum: Chelicerata
- Class: Arachnida
- Order: Araneae
- Infraorder: Araneomorphae
- Family: Araneidae
- Genus: Coelossia; Simon, 1895

Type species
- C. aciculata Simon, 1895

Species
- C. aciculata Simon, 1895 – Sierra Leone; C. trituberculata Simon, 1903 – Mauritius, Madagascar

Genus of spiders

Coelossia is a genus of African orb-weaver spiders first described by Eugène Simon in 1895. As of November 2026 it contains only two species.
