= Artonis =

Scientific classification
- Kingdom: Animalia
- Phylum: Arthropoda
- Subphylum: Chelicerata
- Class: Arachnida
- Order: Araneae
- Infraorder: Araneomorphae
- Family: Araneidae
- Genus: Artonis; Simon, 1895

Type species
- A. bituberculata (Thorell, 1895)

Species
- Artonis bituberculata (Thorell, 1895); Artonis gallana (Pavesi, 1895)

Genus of spiders

Artonis is a genus of orb-weaver spiders first described by Eugène Simon in 1895. As of November 2026 it contains only two species, A. gallana from Ethiopia and A. bituberculata from Myanmar.
