= Carepalxis =

Scientific classification
- Kingdom: Animalia
- Phylum: Arthropoda
- Subphylum: Chelicerata
- Class: Arachnida
- Order: Araneae
- Infraorder: Araneomorphae
- Family: Araneidae
- Genus: Carepalxis; L. Koch, 1872

Type species
- C. montifera L. Koch, 1872

Species
- 8, see text

Genus of spiders

Carepalxis is a genus of orb-weaver spiders first described by Ludwig Carl Christian Koch in 1872. These spiders only build webs at night and break them down in the morning. C. coronata builds orb webs up to 60 centimetres (24 in) in diameter with closely woven spiral threads.

== Species ==
As of November 2026 it contains eight species:

- Carepalxis beelzebub (Hasselt, 1873) — New Guinea, Australia
- Carepalxis bilobata Keyserling, 1886 — Queensland, New South Wales, Victoria
- Carepalxis ferreirasousai Castanheira, Dimitrov, Baptista, Scharff & Framenau, 2025 — Australia
- Carepalxis kolla Castanheira, Dimitrov, Baptista, Scharff & Framenau, 2025 — South Australia
- Carepalxis megalostylus Castanheira, Dimitrov, Baptista, Scharff & Framenau, 2025 — South Australia, Queensland, New South Wales
- Carepalxis montifera L. Koch, 1872 — Queensland, Western Australia, South Australia, New South Wales
- Carepalxis tholos Castanheira, Dimitrov, Baptista, Scharff & Framenau, 2025 — Australia
- Carepalxis tuberculata Keyserling, 1886 — Australia
