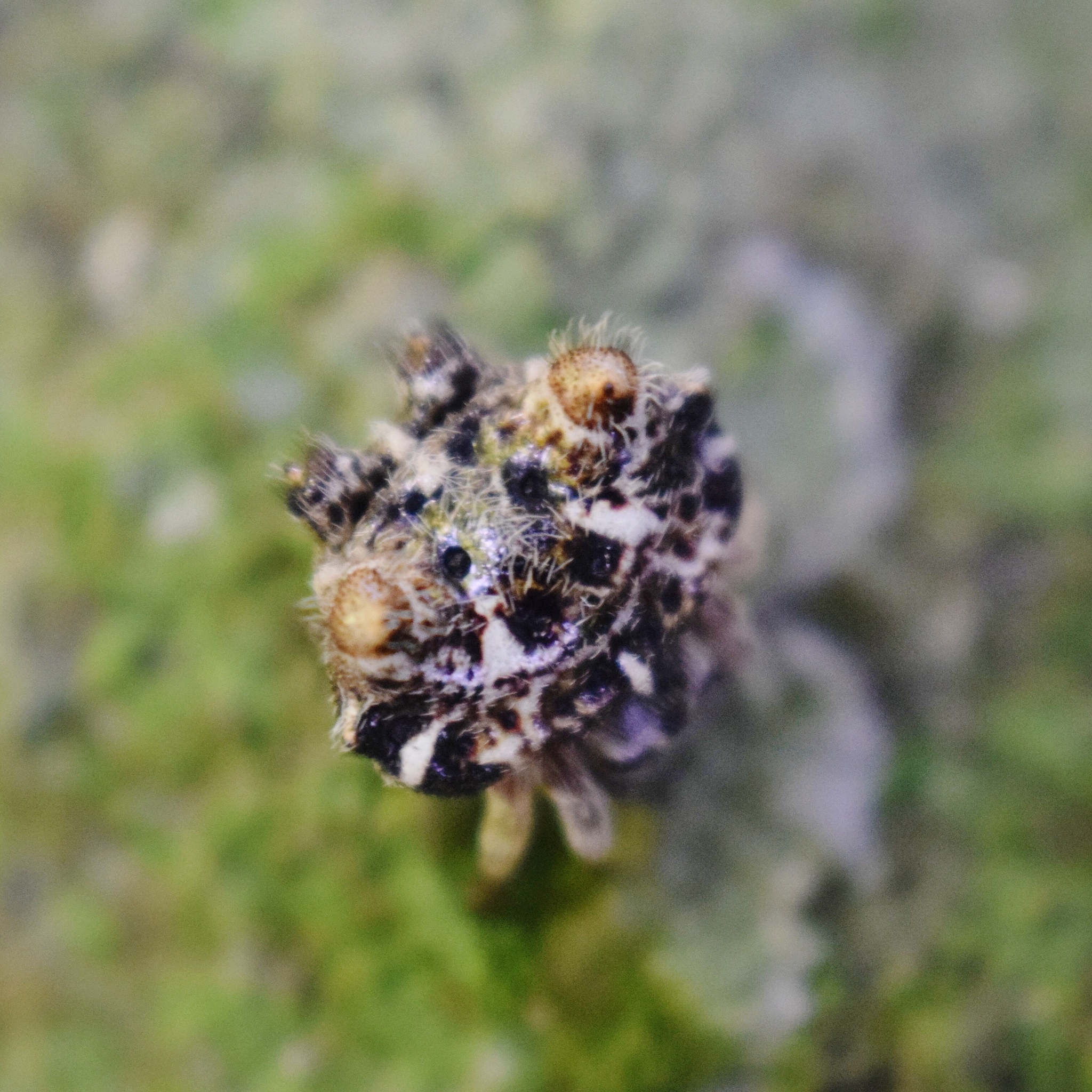
- A. camerunensis
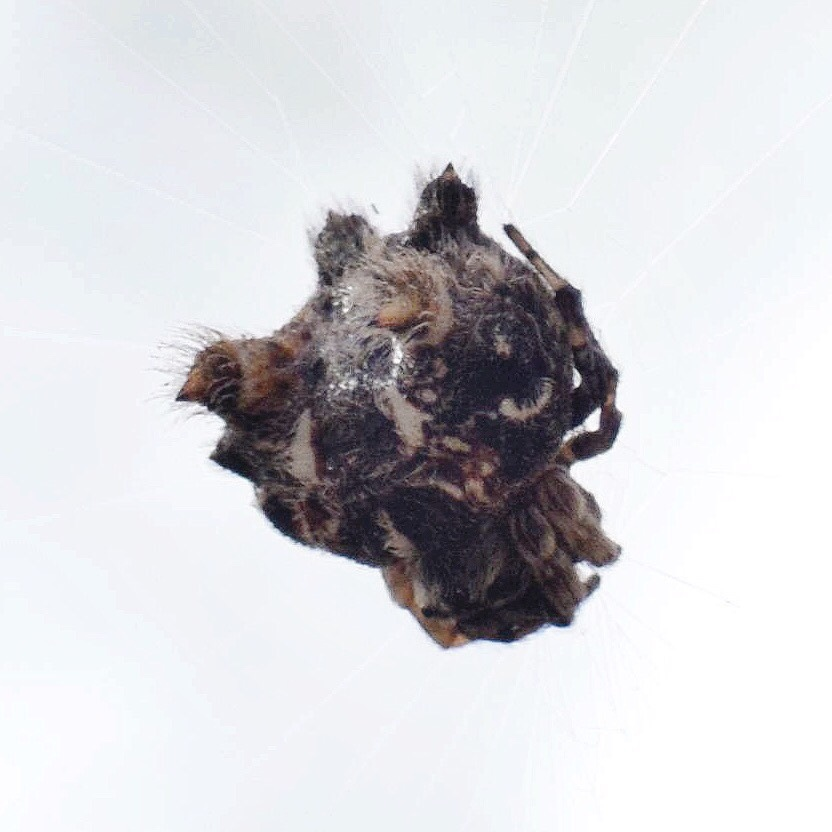
- A. camerunensis

Scientific classification
- Kingdom: Animalia
- Phylum: Arthropoda
- Subphylum: Chelicerata
- Class: Arachnida
- Order: Araneae
- Infraorder: Araneomorphae
- Family: Araneidae
- Genus: Afracantha; Dahl, 1914
- Species: A. camerunensis

Binomial name
- Afracantha camerunensis (Thorell, 1899)

Synonyms
- Gasteracantha brevispina camerunensis Thorell, 1899; Gasteracantha batesi Pocock, 1900

= Afracantha =

Cameroon Spiny-Backed Orb-Web Spider

Species of spider

Afracantha is a genus of African orb-weaver spiders containing the single species, Afracantha camerunensis. It was first described by Friedrich Dahl in 1914, and has only been found in Africa.

== Distribution ==
Afracantha camerunensis has been recorded from Cameroon, Democratic Republic of the Congo, Zambia, Botswana, and Eswatini. In South Africa, it occurs in four provinces: Eastern Cape, KwaZulu-Natal, and Limpopo.

== Habitat and ecology ==
The species inhabits Savanna and Indian Ocean Coastal Belt biomes, occurring in the shrub and tree layer. It is found at altitudes ranging from 5 to 425 m above sea level.

Afracantha camerunensis constructs vertically oriented, colorless orb-webs with a diameter of about 20 cm. The webs are supported by long bridge lines and positioned about two meters from the ground. One observation documented a web in an open area of mown grassland dotted with Vachellia trees in the Umgeni Valley.

== Description ==
The genus Afracantha is characterized by a broad carapace and features a slight indentation between the cephalic and thoracic regions, with a hump present behind the eye region. The lateral eyes are positioned close together on the carapace border but are widely spaced from the median eyes, while the posterior median eyes are slightly wider apart than the anterior median eyes.

The sternum has a posterior tip that extends between the coxae of leg IV. When viewed from the side, the abdomen appears high and is hard in texture, covered with scattered brown hair. From a dorsal view, the abdomen displays a rounded anterior edge that bears sigilla, and features two prominent tubercles with sharp tips located postero-laterally as well as another two tubercles on the posterior edge.

The legs are short in length and are arranged around the carapace.

== Taxonomy ==
The species was originally described by Tamerlan Thorell in 1899 as Gasteracantha brevispina camerunensis. It represents a monotypic genus and is known only from females.

== Conservation ==
Afracantha camerunensis is listed as Least Concern by the South African National Biodiversity Institute due to its wide distribution. In South Africa, it is protected in five areas including Cwebe Nature Reserve, Ndumo Game Reserve, Opathe Nature Reserve, uMkhuze Game Reserve, and Kruger National Park.
