= Thorellina =

Scientific classification
- Domain: Eukaryota
- Kingdom: Animalia
- Phylum: Arthropoda
- Subphylum: Chelicerata
- Class: Arachnida
- Order: Araneae
- Infraorder: Araneomorphae
- Family: Araneidae
- Genus: Thorellina; Berg, 1899

Type species
- T. acuminata (Thorell, 1898)

Species
- T. acuminata (Thorell, 1898) – Myanmar; T. anepsia (Kulczyński, 1911) – New Guinea

Genus of spiders

Thorellina is a genus of southeast Asian orb-weaver spiders first described by C. Berg in 1899. As of April 2019 it contains only two species from Myanmar and Papua New Guinea.
