= Cnodalia =

Scientific classification
- Kingdom: Animalia
- Phylum: Arthropoda
- Subphylum: Chelicerata
- Class: Arachnida
- Order: Araneae
- Infraorder: Araneomorphae
- Family: Araneidae
- Genus: Cnodalia; Thorell, 1890

Type species
- C. harpax Thorell, 1890

Species
- 4, see text

Genus of spiders

Cnodalia is a genus of Asian orb-weaver spiders first described by Tamerlan Thorell in 1890.

== Species ==
As of November 2026 it contains four species:

- Cnodalia ampliabdominis (Song, Zhang & Zhu, 2006) – China
- Cnodalia flavescens Mi, Peng & Yin, 2010 – China
- Cnodalia harpax Thorell, 1890 – Sumatra, Ryukyu Islands
- Cnodalia quadrituberculata Mi, Peng & Yin, 2010 – China
