= Nemosinga =

Scientific classification
- Kingdom: Animalia
- Phylum: Arthropoda
- Subphylum: Chelicerata
- Class: Arachnida
- Order: Araneae
- Infraorder: Araneomorphae
- Family: Araneidae
- Genus: Nemosinga; Caporiacco, 1947

Type species
- N. atra Caporiacco, 1947

Species
- N. atra Caporiacco, 1947 – Tanzania; N. atra Caporiacco, 1947 – Tanzania; N. strandi Caporiacco, 1947 – Tanzania

Genus of spiders

Nemosinga is a genus of East African orb-weaver spiders first described by Lodovico di Caporiacco in 1947. As of November 2026 it contains only three species, all found in Tanzania.
