= Heterognatha =

Scientific classification
- Kingdom: Animalia
- Phylum: Arthropoda
- Subphylum: Chelicerata
- Class: Arachnida
- Order: Araneae
- Infraorder: Araneomorphae
- Family: Araneidae
- Genus: Heterognatha; Nicolet, 1849
- Species: H. chilensis

Binomial name
- Heterognatha chilensis Nicolet, 1849

Genus of spiders

Heterognatha is a genus of South American orb-weaver spiders containing the single species, Heterognatha chilensis. It was first described by H. Nicolet in 1849, and has only been found in Chile.
