= Deione =

Scientific classification
- Kingdom: Animalia
- Phylum: Arthropoda
- Subphylum: Chelicerata
- Class: Arachnida
- Order: Araneae
- Infraorder: Araneomorphae
- Family: Araneidae
- Genus: Deione; Thorell, 1898

Type species
- D. thoracica Thorell, 1898

Species
- 6, see text

Genus of spiders

Deione is a genus of Asian orb-weaver spiders first described by Tamerlan Thorell in 1898.

== Species ==
As of November 2026 it contains six species:

- Deione cheni Mi & Li, 2021 – China
- Deione lingulata Han, Zhu & Levi, 2009 – China
- Deione ovata Mi, Peng & Yin, 2010 – China
- Deione renaria Mi, Peng & Yin, 2010 – China
- Deione thoracica Thorell, 1898 – Myanmar
- Deione yangi Mi & Li, 2021 – China
