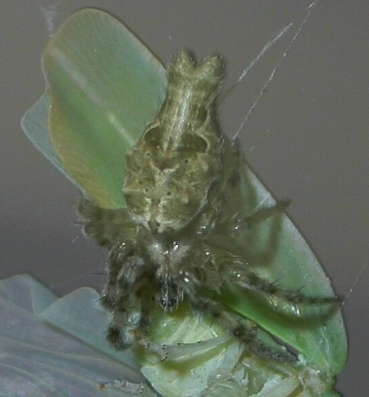
- Allocyclosa bifurca

Scientific classification
- Domain: Eukaryota
- Kingdom: Animalia
- Phylum: Arthropoda
- Subphylum: Chelicerata
- Class: Arachnida
- Order: Araneae
- Infraorder: Araneomorphae
- Family: Araneidae
- Genus: Allocyclosa
- Species: A. bifurca

Binomial name
- Allocyclosa bifurca (McCook, 1887)

Synonyms
- Allocyclosa furcata; Cyrtophora bifurca; Cyclosa bifurca; Cyclosa fissicauda; Cyclosa furcata; Larinia fissicauda

= Allocyclosa =

Genus of spiders

Allocyclosa is a genus of orb weaver spiders that contains only one species, Allocyclosa bifurca. It was first described in 1887 by McCook under the name Cyrtophora bifurca, and was transferred to its own genus in 1999. It is the only Cyclosa species north of Mexico to have a forked rear tip of the abdomen hence the name bifurca, Latin for "two-pronged". The forked tip of the abdomen, bearing two humps shaped like the letter M, is a defining feature in both males and females, though it is similar to features present in certain Cyrtophora species. Both sexes are a grey-green color, though only females have an area of red on their underside between the epigynum and the spinnerets. Females are much larger than males, ranging from five to nine millimeters, while males range from two to three millimeters. Males appear to be very uncommon, but they are probably often overlooked by collectors due to their small size. In a 1977 study by Levi, only two of the nearly 350 specimens that were positively identified as Cyrtophora bifurca were males. This is a very unusual distribution; a second, less likely explanation that has been proposed is that females of the species, which have less prominent genitalia compared with those of other members of the orb-weaver family, may be parthenogenic, are able to reproduce without the help of males. Like most other members of Araneidae, these spiders build orb webs, six to eight inches in diameter, but employ an unusual form of protective mimicry. Females often sit in the middle of a vertical row of web decoration that include egg sacs and wrapped prey. Because the spider and the egg sacs have a similar color and shape, it is difficult to distinguish the egg sacs from the spider itself.
