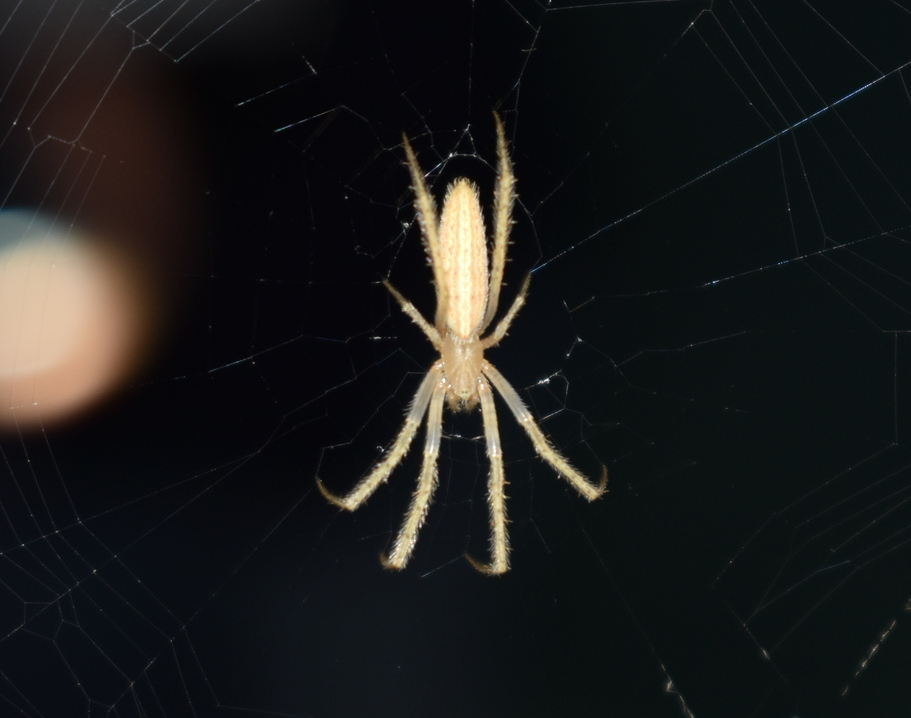
- S. dufouri in Italy

Scientific classification
- Kingdom: Animalia
- Phylum: Arthropoda
- Subphylum: Chelicerata
- Class: Arachnida
- Order: Araneae
- Infraorder: Araneomorphae
- Family: Araneidae
- Genus: Siwa; Grasshoff, 1970

Type species
- S. atomaria (O. Pickard-Cambridge, 1876)

Species
- S. atomaria (O. Pickard-Cambridge, 1876); S. dufouri (Simon, 1874)

= Siwa (spider) =

Genus of spiders

Siwa is a genus of orb-weaver spiders first described by Manfred Grasshoff in 1970.

== Species ==
As of January 2026, this genus includes two species:

- Siwa atomaria (O. Pickard-Cambridge, 1876) – Egypt, Israel, Azerbaijan, Iran
- Siwa dufouri (Simon, 1874) – Spain, France, Italy (Sardinia), Malta, Greece, Algeria
