= Spilasma =

Scientific classification
- Domain: Eukaryota
- Kingdom: Animalia
- Phylum: Arthropoda
- Subphylum: Chelicerata
- Class: Arachnida
- Order: Araneae
- Infraorder: Araneomorphae
- Family: Araneidae
- Genus: Spilasma; Simon, 1897

Type species
- S. duodecimguttata (Keyserling, 1879)

Species
- S. baptistai Levi, 1995 – Brazil; S. duodecimguttata (Keyserling, 1879) – Honduras to Bolivia, Brazil; S. utaca Levi, 1995 – Peru

Genus of spiders

Spilasma is a genus of orb-weaver spiders first described by Eugène Simon in 1897. As of April 2019 it contains only three species.
