= Faradja =

Scientific classification
- Domain: Eukaryota
- Kingdom: Animalia
- Phylum: Arthropoda
- Subphylum: Chelicerata
- Class: Arachnida
- Order: Araneae
- Infraorder: Araneomorphae
- Family: Araneidae
- Genus: Faradja; Grasshoff, 1970
- Species: F. faradjensis

Binomial name
- Faradja faradjensis (Lessert, 1930)

Genus of spiders

Faradja is a genus of Central African orb-weaver spiders containing the single species, Faradja faradjensis. It was first described by M. Grasshoff in 1970, and has only been found in Middle Africa.
