= Pronoides =

Scientific classification
- Domain: Eukaryota
- Kingdom: Animalia
- Phylum: Arthropoda
- Subphylum: Chelicerata
- Class: Arachnida
- Order: Araneae
- Infraorder: Araneomorphae
- Family: Araneidae
- Genus: Pronoides; Schenkel, 1936

Type species
- P. brunneus Schenkel, 1936

Species
- 6, see text

Genus of spiders

Pronoides is a genus of Asian orb-weaver spiders first described by E. Schenkel in 1936.

== Species ==
As of April 2019 it contains six species:

- Pronoides applanatus Mi & Peng, 2013 – China
- Pronoides brunneus Schenkel, 1936 (type) – Russia (Far East), China, Korea, Japan
- Pronoides fusinus Mi & Peng, 2013 – China
- Pronoides guoi Mi & Peng, 2013 – China
- Pronoides sutaiensis Zhang, Zhang & Zhu, 2010 – China
- Pronoides trapezius Mi & Peng, 2013 – China
