= Alenatea =

Scientific classification
- Kingdom: Animalia
- Phylum: Arthropoda
- Subphylum: Chelicerata
- Class: Arachnida
- Order: Araneae
- Infraorder: Araneomorphae
- Family: Araneidae
- Genus: Alenatea; Song & Zhu, 1999

Type species
- A. fuscocolorata (Bösenberg & Strand, 1906)

Species
- A. acusiseta (Zhu & Song, 1994) – China, Korea, Japan; A. fuscocolorata (Bösenberg & Strand, 1906) – China, Korea, Taiwan, Japan; A. touxie Song & Zhu, 1999 – China; A. wangi Zhu & Song, 1999 – China

Genus of spiders

Alenatea is a genus of Asian orb-weaver spiders first described by D. X. Song, Ming-Sheng Zhu & J. Chen in 1999. As of October 2026 it contains only four species.
