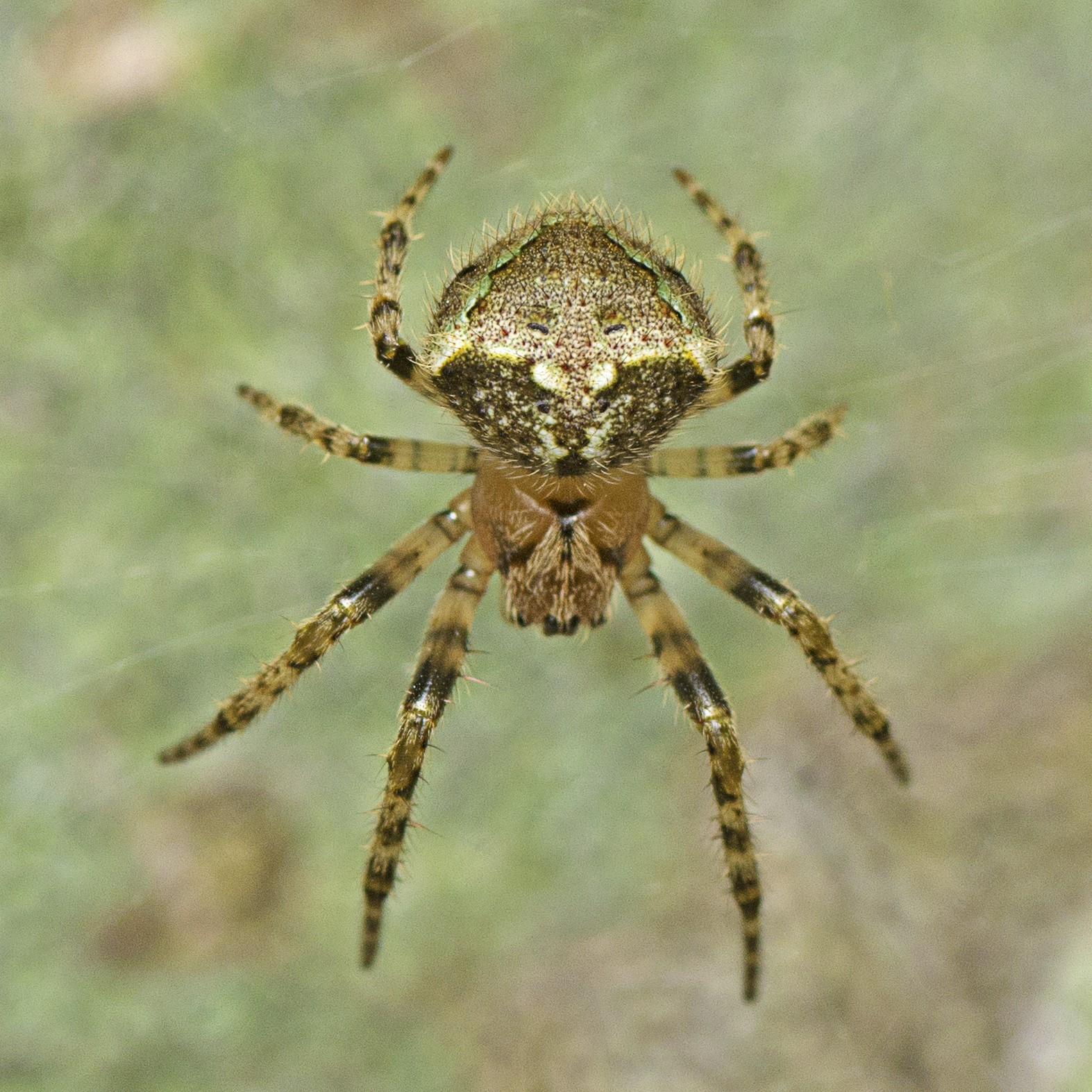
- Telaprocera maudae

Scientific classification
- Kingdom: Animalia
- Phylum: Arthropoda
- Subphylum: Chelicerata
- Class: Arachnida
- Order: Araneae
- Infraorder: Araneomorphae
- Family: Araneidae
- Genus: Telaprocera; Harmer & Framenau, 2008

Type species
- T. maudae Harmer & Framenau, 2008

Species
- T. joanae Harmer & Framenau, 2008 – Australia (Queensland to Victoria); T. maudae Harmer & Framenau, 2008 – Australia (Queensland, New South Wales)

= Telaprocera =

Genus of spiders

Telaprocera is a genus of Australian orb-weaver spiders first described by A. M. T. Harmer & V. W. Framenau in 2008. As of April 2019 it contains only two species.
