= Enacrosoma =

Enacrosoma Temporal range: Neogene–present

Scientific classification
- Kingdom: Animalia
- Phylum: Arthropoda
- Subphylum: Chelicerata
- Class: Arachnida
- Order: Araneae
- Infraorder: Araneomorphae
- Family: Araneidae
- Genus: Enacrosoma; Mello-Leitão, 1932

Type species
- E. anomalum (Taczanowski, 1873)

Species
- 6, see text

Genus of spiders

Enacrosoma is a genus of orb-weaver spiders first described by Cândido Firmino de Mello-Leitão in 1932.

== Species ==
As of November 2026 it contains six species found from Mexico to Brazil:

- Enacrosoma anomalum (Taczanowski, 1873) – Colombia, Peru to Brazil, French Guiana
- Enacrosoma decemtuberculatum (O. Pickard-Cambridge, 1890) – Guatemala
- Enacrosoma frenca Levi, 1996 – Mexico to Panama
- Enacrosoma javium Levi, 1996 – Costa Rica, Panama
- Enacrosoma multilobatum (Simon, 1897) – Peru
- Enacrosoma quizarra Levi, 1996 – Costa Rica
