= Edricus =

Scientific classification
- Kingdom: Animalia
- Phylum: Arthropoda
- Subphylum: Chelicerata
- Class: Arachnida
- Order: Araneae
- Infraorder: Araneomorphae
- Family: Araneidae
- Genus: Edricus; O. Pickard-Cambridge, 1890

Type species
- E. spiniger O. Pickard-Cambridge, 1890

Species
- E. productus O. Pickard-Cambridge, 1896 – Mexico; E. spiniger O. Pickard-Cambridge, 1890 – Panama to Ecuador

Genus of spiders

Edricus is a genus of orb-weaver spiders first described by O. Pickard-Cambridge in 1890. As of November 2026 it contains only two species.
