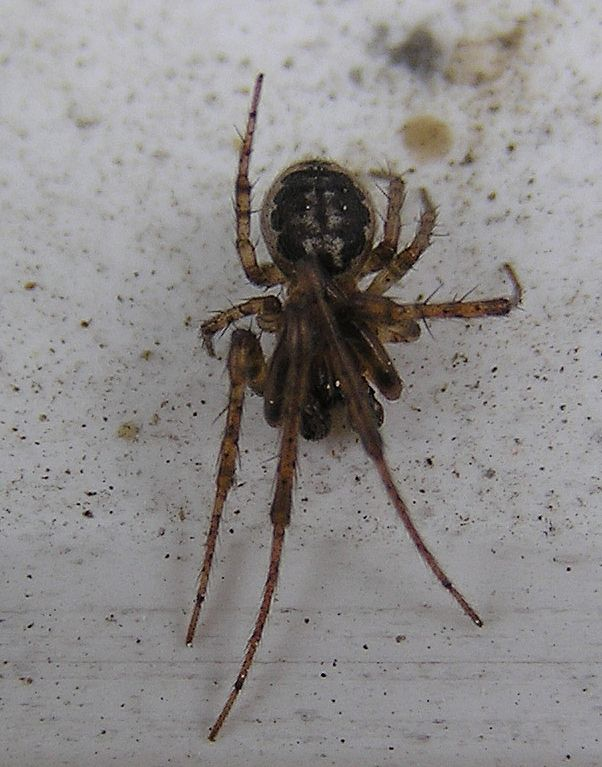
- Leviellus stroemi

Scientific classification
- Kingdom: Animalia
- Phylum: Arthropoda
- Subphylum: Chelicerata
- Class: Arachnida
- Order: Araneae
- Infraorder: Araneomorphae
- Family: Araneidae
- Genus: Leviellus; Wunderlich, 2004

Type species
- L. kochi (Thorell, 1870)

Species
- 6, see text

Synonyms
- Stroemiellus Wunderlich, 2004

= Leviellus =

Genus of spiders

Leviellus, synonym Stroemiellus, is a genus of orb-weaver spiders first described by J. Wunderlich in 2004.

== Species ==
As of November 2026 it contains six species across Europe, Asia, and Africa:

- Leviellus caspicus (Simon, 1889) – Central Asia, Iran
- Leviellus inconveniens (O. Pickard-Cambridge, 1872) – Lebanon, Israel
- Leviellus kochi (Thorell, 1870) – Southern Europe, Turkey, North Africa, Central Asia
- Leviellus poriensis (Levy, 1987) – Israel
- Leviellus stroemi (Thorell, 1870) – Europe, Russia (Europe to Far East), Kazakhstan, Korea
- Leviellus thorelli (Ausserer, 1871) – France, Central, Southern and South-Eastern Europe
