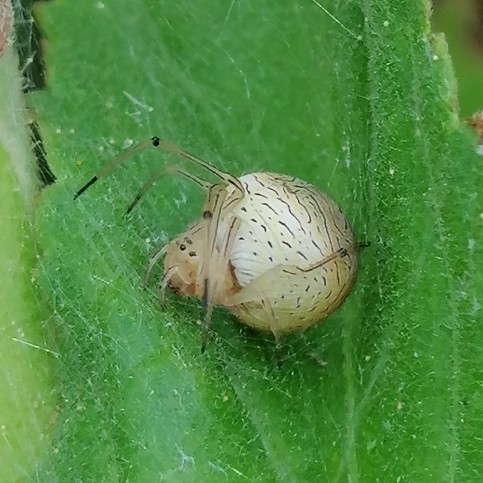
- Bertrana striolata

Scientific classification
- Kingdom: Animalia
- Phylum: Arthropoda
- Subphylum: Chelicerata
- Class: Arachnida
- Order: Araneae
- Infraorder: Araneomorphae
- Family: Araneidae
- Genus: Bertrana; Keyserling, 1884

Type species
- B. striolata Keyserling, 1884

Species
- 12, see text

Synonyms
- Diotherisoma

= Bertrana =

Genus of spiders

Bertrana is a genus of Central and South American orb-weaver spiders first described by Eugen von Keyserling in 1884. It includes some of the smallest known araneid orb-weavers. Bertrana striolata females are 4.5 mm long or less. The eight eyes are in two rows. The abdomen is white on top and on the sides, with multiple hieroglyphic-like lines and bars of many different shapes and length. In females, these are red, in males, black.

== Species ==
As of November 2026 it contains twelve species:

- Bertrana abbreviata (Keyserling, 1879) – Colombia
- Bertrana arena Levi, 1989 – Costa Rica
- Bertrana benuta Levi, 1994 – Colombia
- Bertrana elinguis (Keyserling, 1883) – Ecuador, Peru, Brazil, French Guiana
- Bertrana laselva Levi, 1989 – Costa Rica
- Bertrana nancho Levi, 1989 – Peru
- Bertrana planada Levi, 1989 – Colombia, Ecuador
- Bertrana poa Levi, 1994 – Ecuador
- Bertrana rufostriata Simon, 1893 – Venezuela, Brazil
- Bertrana striolata Keyserling, 1884 – Costa Rica to Argentina
- Bertrana urahua Levi, 1994 – Ecuador
- Bertrana vella Levi, 1989 – Panama, Colombia
