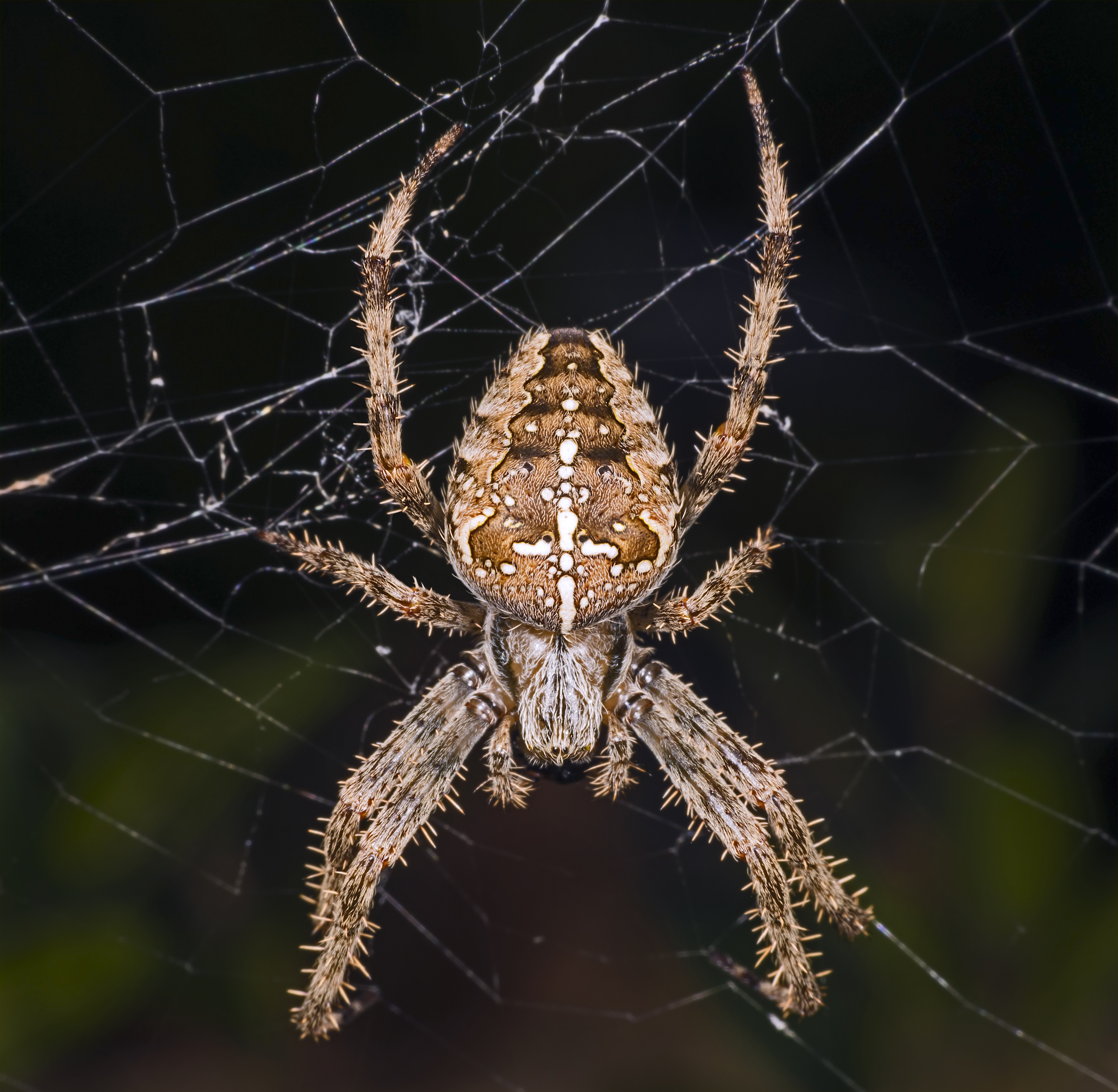
- female Araneus diadematus
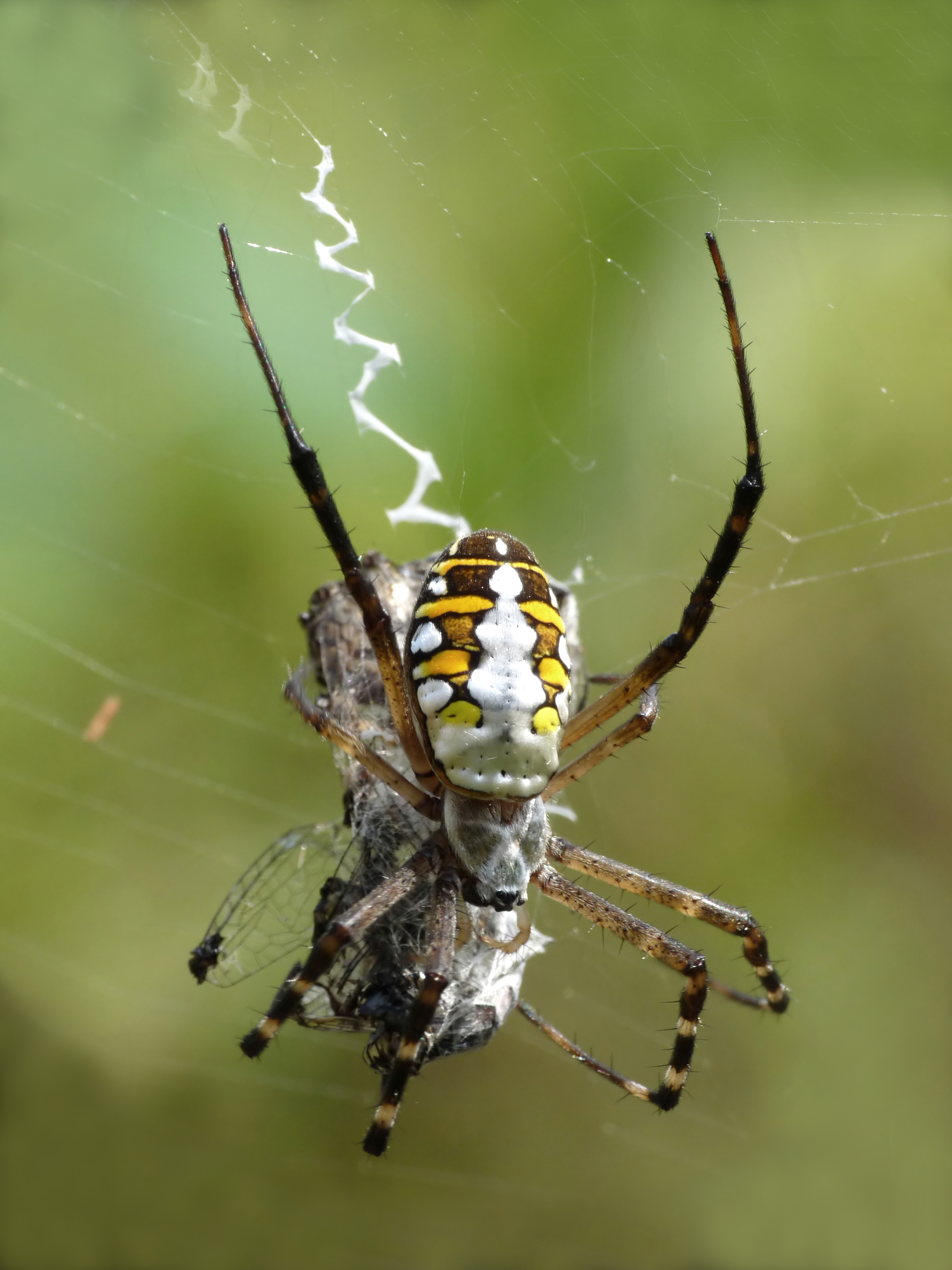
- Argiope catenulata

Scientific classification
- Kingdom: Animalia
- Phylum: Arthropoda
- Subphylum: Chelicerata
- Class: Arachnida
- Order: Araneae
- Infraorder: Araneomorphae
- Superfamily: Araneoidea
- Family: Araneidae; Clerck, 1757

Diversity
- 200 genera, 3,182 species
- blue: reported countries (WSC) green: observation hotspots (iNaturalist)

= Orb-weaver spider =

Orb-weaver spiders Temporal range: Cretaceous–present

Family of spiders

Orb-weaver spiders are members of the spider family Araneidae. They are the most common group of builders of spiral wheel-shaped webs often found in gardens, fields, and forests. The English word "orb" can mean "circular", hence the English name of the group. Araneids have eight similar eyes, hairy or spiny legs, and no stridulating organs.

The family has a cosmopolitan distribution, including many well-known large or brightly colored garden spiders. With almost 5,000 described species in about 200 genera worldwide, the Araneidae comprise one of the largest family of spiders (with the Salticidae and Linyphiidae). Araneid webs are constructed in a stereotypical fashion, where a framework of nonsticky silk is built up before the spider adds a final spiral of silk covered in sticky droplets.

Orb webs are also produced by members of other spider families. The long-jawed orb weavers (Tetragnathidae) were formerly included in the Araneidae; they are closely related, being part of the superfamily Araneoidea. The family Arkyidae has been split off from the Araneidae. The cribellate or hackled orb-weavers (Uloboridae) belong to a different group of spiders. Their webs are strikingly similar, but use a different kind of silk.

== Description ==
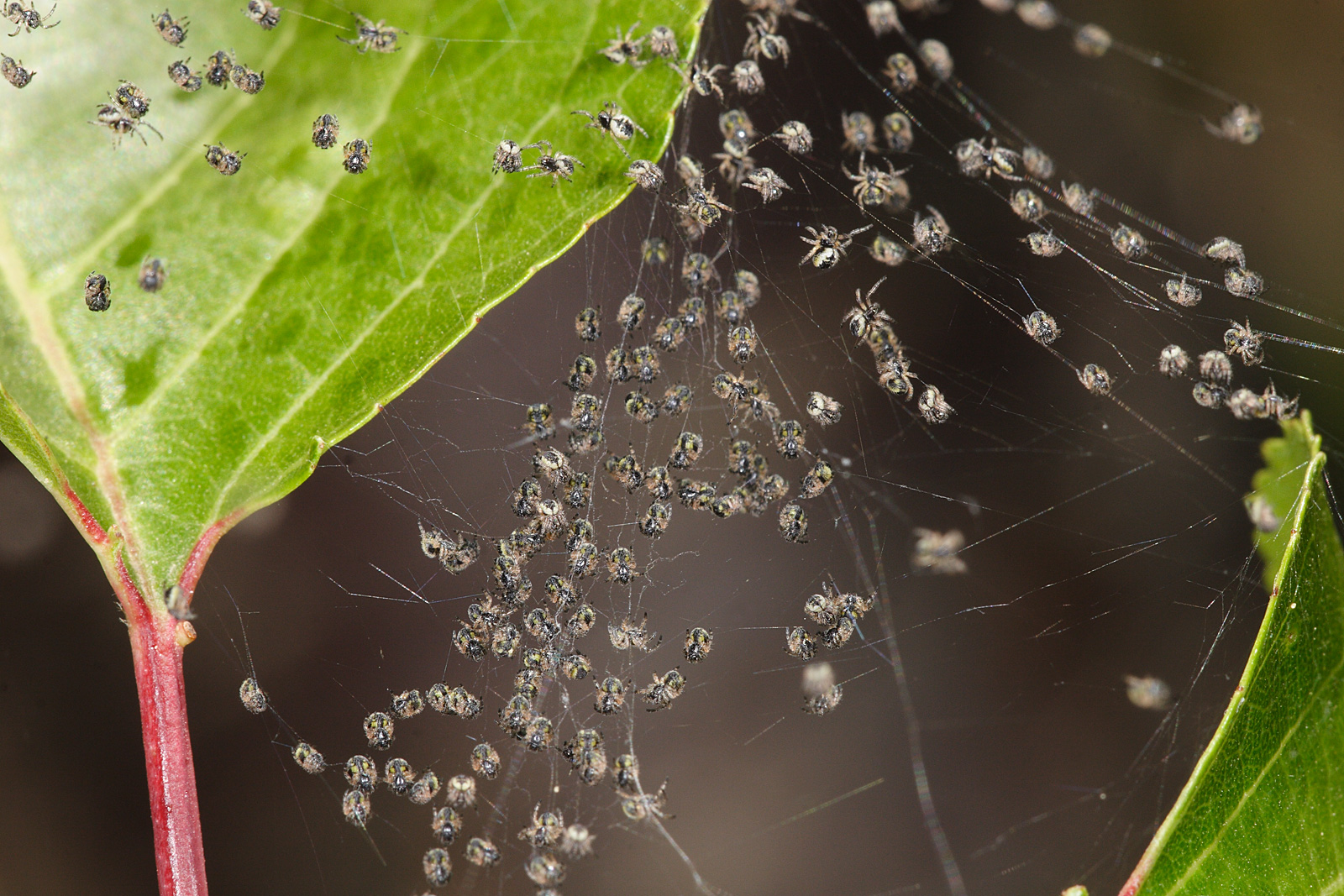
Spiderlings in the web near where they hatched

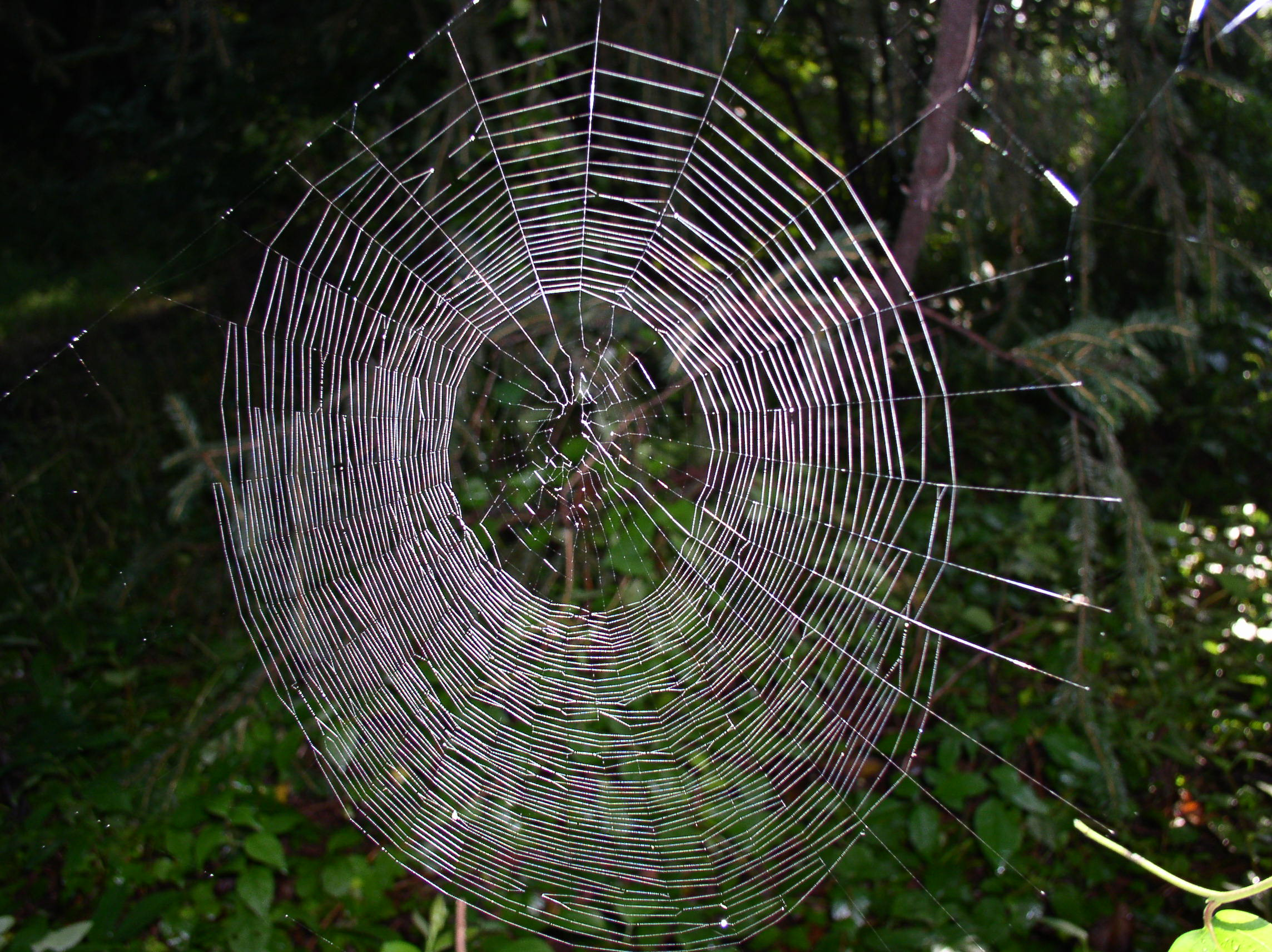
Araneidae web

Generally, orb-weaving spiders are three-clawed builders of flat webs with sticky spiral capture silk. The building of a web is an engineering feat, begun when the spider floats a line on the wind to another surface. The spider secures the line and then drops another line from the center, making a "Y". The rest of the scaffolding follows with many radii of nonsticky silk being constructed before a final spiral of sticky capture silk.

The third claw is used to walk on the nonsticky part of the web. Characteristically, the prey insect that blunders into the sticky lines is stunned by a quick bite, and then wrapped in silk. If the prey is a venomous insect, such as a wasp, wrapping may precede biting and/or stinging. Much of the orb-spinning spiders' success in capturing insects depends on the web not being visible to the prey, with the stickiness of the web increasing the visibility, thus decreasing the chances of capturing prey. This leads to a trade-off between the visibility of the web and the web's prey-retention ability.

Many orb-weavers build a new web each day. Most orb-weavers tend to be active during the evening hours; they hide for most of the day. Generally, towards evening, the spider consumes the old web, rests for about an hour, then spins a new web in the same general location. Thus, the webs of orb-weavers are generally free of the accumulation of detritus common to other species, such as black widow spiders.

Some orb-weavers do not build webs at all. Members of the genera Mastophora in the Americas, Cladomelea in Africa, and Ordgarius in Australia produce sticky globules, which contain a pheromone analog. The globule is hung from a silken thread dangled by the spider from its front legs. The pheromone analog attracts male moths of only a few species. These get stuck on the globule and are reeled in to be eaten. Both genera of bolas spiders are highly camouflaged and difficult to locate.

In the Araneus diadematus, variables such as wind, web support, temperatures, humidity, and silk supply all proved to be variables in web construction. When studied against the tests of nature, the spiders were able to decide what shape to make their web, how many capture spirals, or the width of their web. Though it could be expected for these spiders to just know these things, it is not well researched yet as to just how the arachnid knows how to change their web design based on their surroundings. Some scientists suggest that it could be through the spider's spatial learning on their environmental surroundings and the knowing of what will or will not work compared to natural behavioristic rules.

The spiny orb-weaving spiders in the genera Gasteracantha and Micrathena look like plant seeds or thorns hanging in their orb-webs. Some species of Gasteracantha have very long, horn-like spines protruding from their abdomens.

One feature of the webs of some orb-weavers is the stabilimentum, a crisscross band of silk through the center of the web. It is found in several genera, but Argiope – the yellow and banded garden spiders of North America – is a prime example. As orb-weavers age, they tend to have less production of their silk; many adult orb-weavers can then depend on their coloration to attract more of their prey. The band may be a lure for prey, a marker to warn birds away from the web, and a camouflage for the spider when it sits in the web. The stabilimentum may decrease the visibility of the silk to insects, thus making it harder for prey to avoid the web. In the genus Cyclosa, some species have been documented to construct stabilimenta made of silk and detritus that are shaped to visually resemble a larger, more threatening spider, an anti-predator strategy known as decoy mimicry. The orb-web consists of a frame and supporting radii overlaid with a sticky capture spiral, and the silks used by orb-weaver spiders have exceptional mechanical properties to withstand the impact of flying prey. The orb-weaving spider Zygiella x-notata produces a unique orb-web with a characteristic missing sector, similar to other species of the Zygiella genus in the Araneidae family.

During the Cretaceous, a radiation of flowering plants and their insect pollinators occurred. Fossil evidence shows that the orb web was in existence at this time, which permitted a concurrent radiation of the spider predators along with their insect prey. The capacity of orb–webs to absorb the impact of flying prey led orbicularian spiders to become the dominant predators of aerial insects in many ecosystems. Insects and spiders have comparable rates of diversification, suggesting they co-radiated, and the peak of this radiation occurred 100 Mya, before the origin of angiosperms. Vollrath and Selden (2007) make the bold proposition that insect evolution was driven less by flowering plants than by spider predation – particularly through orb webs – as a major selective force. On the other hand some analyses have yielded estimates as high as 265 Mya, with a large number (including Dimitrov et al 2016) intermediate between the two.

Most arachnid webs are vertical and the spiders usually hang with their heads downward. A few webs, such as those of orb-weavers in the genus Metepeira, have the orb hidden within a tangled space of web. Some Metepiera species are semisocial and live in communal webs. In Mexico, such communal webs have been cut out of trees or bushes and used for living fly paper. In 2009, workers at a Baltimore wastewater treatment plant called for help to deal with over 100 million orb-weaver spiders, living in a community that managed to spin a phenomenal web that covered some 4 acres of a building, with spider densities in some areas reaching 35,176 spiders per cubic meter.

== Taxonomy ==
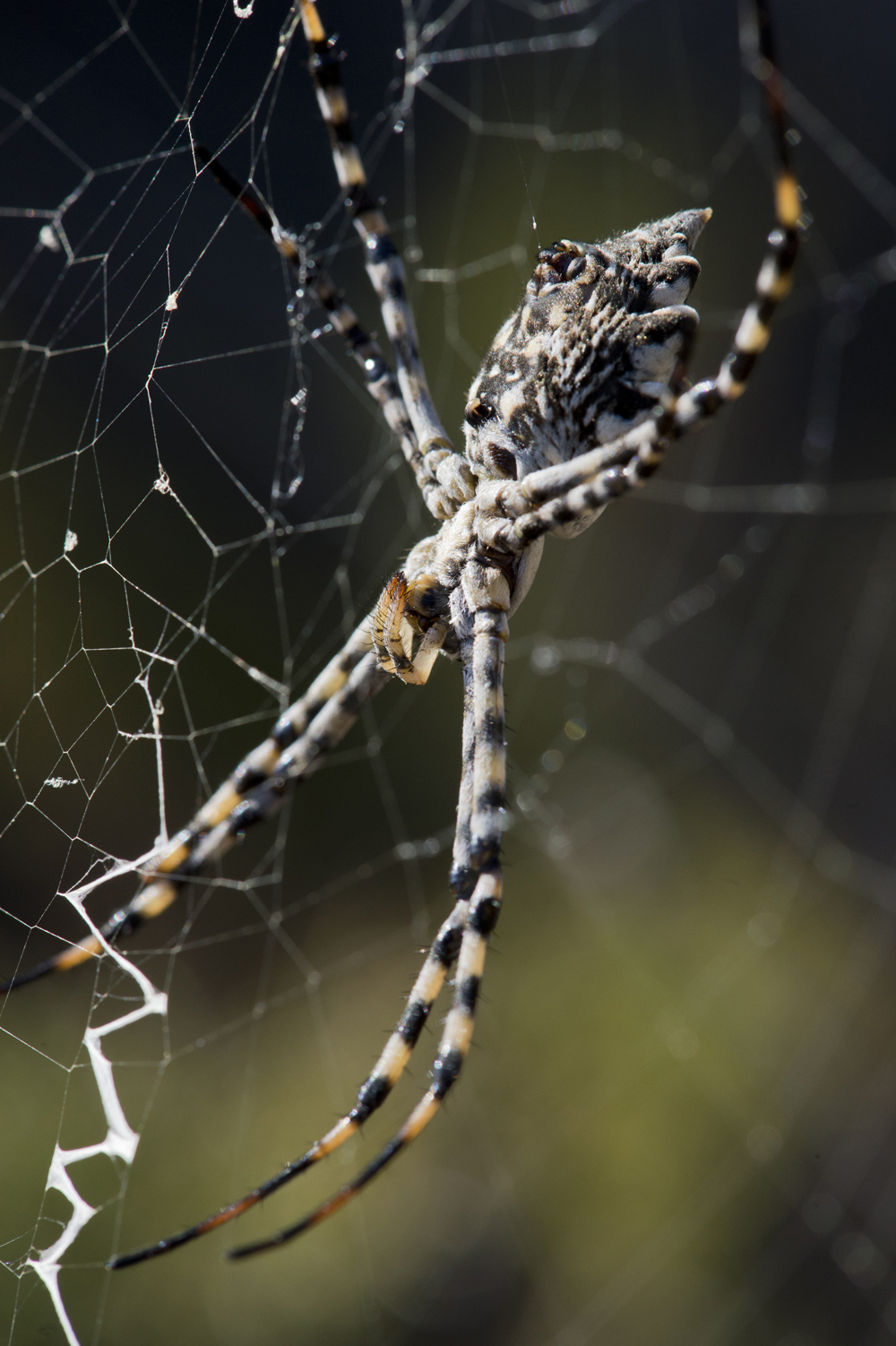
Argiope lobata in southern Spain

The oldest known true orb-weaver is Mesozygiella dunlopi, from the Lower Cretaceous. Several fossils provide direct evidence that the three major orb-weaving families, namely the Araneidae, Tetragnathidae, and Uloboridae, had evolved by this time, about 140 Mya. They probably originated during the Jurassic (200 to 140 million years ago). Based on new molecular evidence in silk genes, all three families are likely to have a common origin.

The two superfamilies, Deinopoidea and Araneoidea, have similar behavioral sequences and spinning apparatuses to produce architecturally similar webs. The latter weave true viscid silk with an aqueous glue property, and the former use dry fibrils and sticky silk. The Deinopoidea (including the Uloboridae), have a cribellum – a flat, complex spinning plate from which the cribellate silk is released.

They also have a calamistrum – an apparatus of bristles used to comb the cribellate silk from the cribellum. The Araneoidea, or the "ecribellate" spiders, do not have these two structures. The two groups of orb-weaving spiders are morphologically very distinct, yet much similarity exists between their web forms and web construction behaviors. The cribellates retained the ancestral character, yet the cribellum was lost in the escribellates. The lack of a functional cribellum in araneoids is most likely synapomorphic.

If the orb-weaver spiders are a monophyletic group, the fact that only some species in the group lost a feature adds to the controversy. The cribellates are split off as a separate taxon that retained the primitive feature, which makes the lineage paraphyletic and not synonymous with any real evolutionary lineage. The morphological and behavioral evidence surrounding orb webs led to the disagreement over a single or a dual origin. While early molecular analysis provided more support for a monophyletic origin, other evidence indicates that orb-weavers evolved earlier phylogenetically than previously thought, and were extinct at least three times during the Cretaceous.

== Reproduction ==
Araneid species either mate at the central hub of the web, where the male slowly traverses the web, trying not to get eaten, and when reaching the hub, mounts the female; or the male constructs a mating thread inside or outside the web to attract the female via vibratory courtship, and if successful, mating occurs on the thread.

In the cannibalistic and polyandrous orb-web spider Argiope bruennichi, the much smaller males are attacked during their first copulation and are cannibalized in up to 80% of the cases. All surviving males die after their second copulation, a pattern observed in other Argiope species. Whether a male survives his first copulation depends on the duration of the genital contact; males that jump off early (before 5 seconds) have a chance of surviving, while males that copulate longer (greater than 10 seconds) invariably die. Prolonged copulation, although associated with cannibalism, enhances sperm transfer and relative paternity.

When males mated with a nonsibling female, the duration of their copulation was prolonged, and consequently the males were cannibalized more frequently. When males mated with a sibling female, they copulated briefly, thus were more likely to escape cannibalism. By escaping, their chance of mating again with an unrelated female likely would be increased. These observations suggest that males can adaptively adjust their investment based on the degree of genetic relatedness of the female to avoid inbreeding depression.

=== Sexual size dimorphism ===
Sexual dimorphism refers to physical differences between males and females of the same species. One such difference can be in size.

Araneids often exhibit size dimorphism typically known as extreme sexual size dimorphism, due to the extent of differences in size. The size difference among species of Araneidae ranges greatly. Some females, such as those of the Nephila pilipes, can be at least 9 times larger than the male, while others are only slightly larger than the male. The larger size female is typically thought to be selected through fecundity selection, the idea that bigger females can produce more eggs, thus more offspring. Although a great deal of evidence points towards the greatest selection pressure on larger female size, some evidence indicates that selection can favor small male size, as well.

Araneids also exhibit a phenomenon called sexual cannibalism, which is commonly found throughout the Araneidae. Evidence suggests a negative correlation between sexual size dimorphism and instances of sexual cannibalism. Other evidence, however, has shown that differences in cannibalistic events among araneids when having smaller or slightly larger males is advantageous.

Some evidence has shown that extreme dimorphism may be the result of males avoiding detection by the females. For males of these species, being smaller in size may be advantageous in moving to the central hub of a web so female spiders may be less likely to detect the male, or even if detected as prey to be eaten, the small size may indicate little nutritional value. Larger-bodied male araneids may be advantageous when mating on a mating thread because the thread is constructed from the edge of the web orb to structural threads or to nearby vegetation. Here larger males may be less likely to be cannibalized, as the males are able to copulate while the female is hanging, which may make them safer from cannibalism. In one subfamily of Araneid that uses a mating thread, Gasteracanthinae, sexual cannibalism is apparently absent despite extreme size dimorphism.

== Genera ==
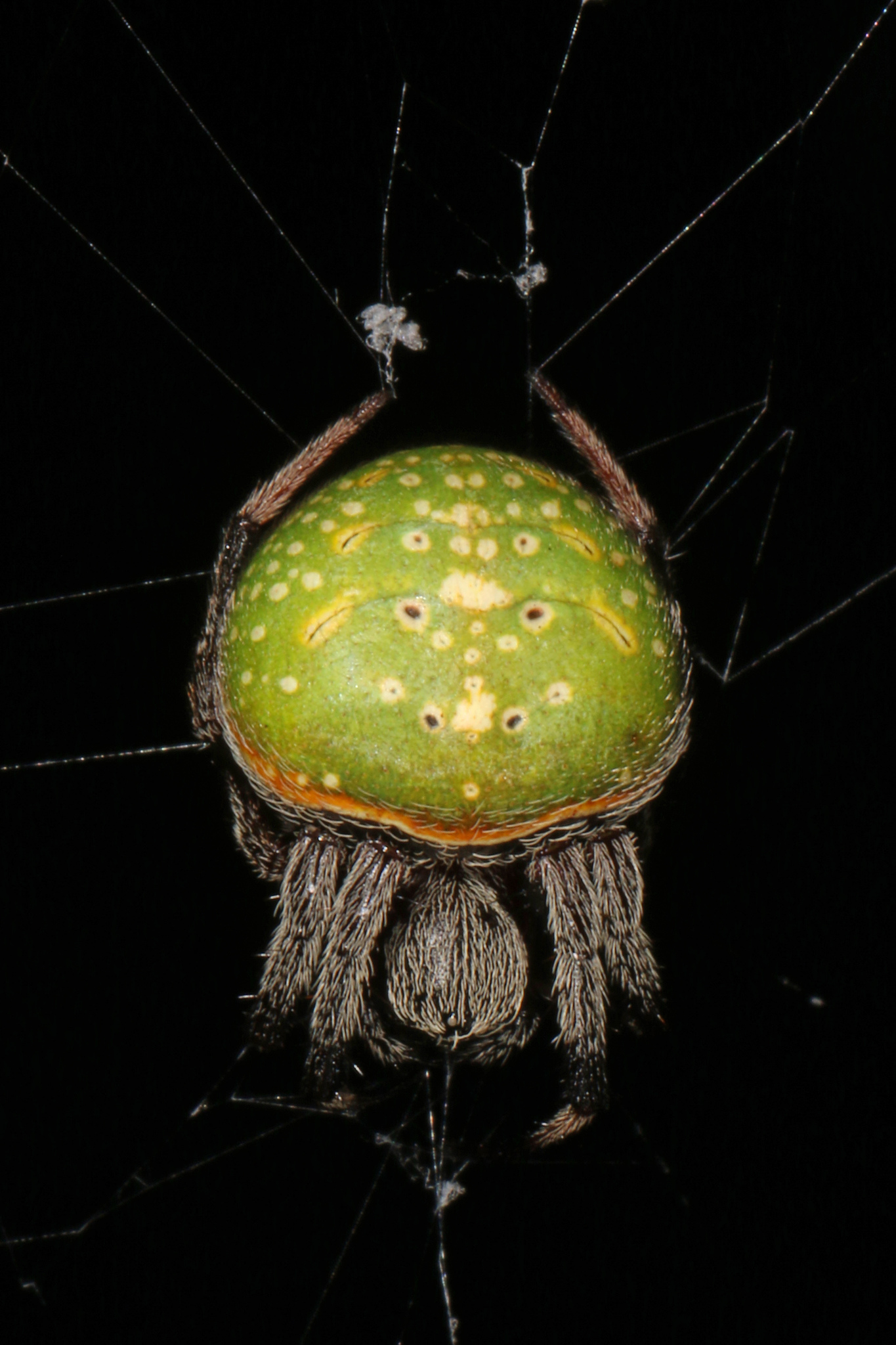
Araneus apricus

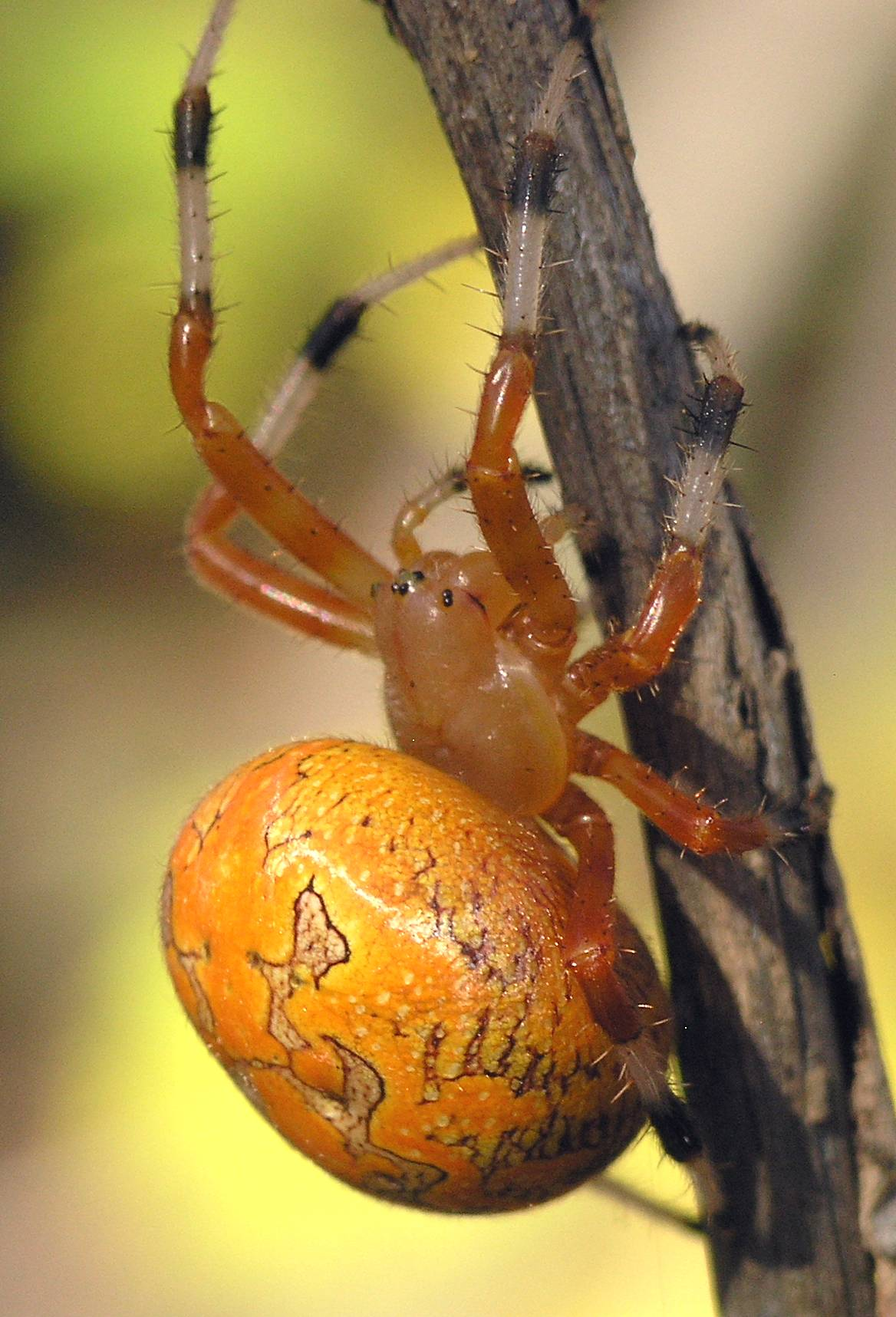
Araneus marmoreus

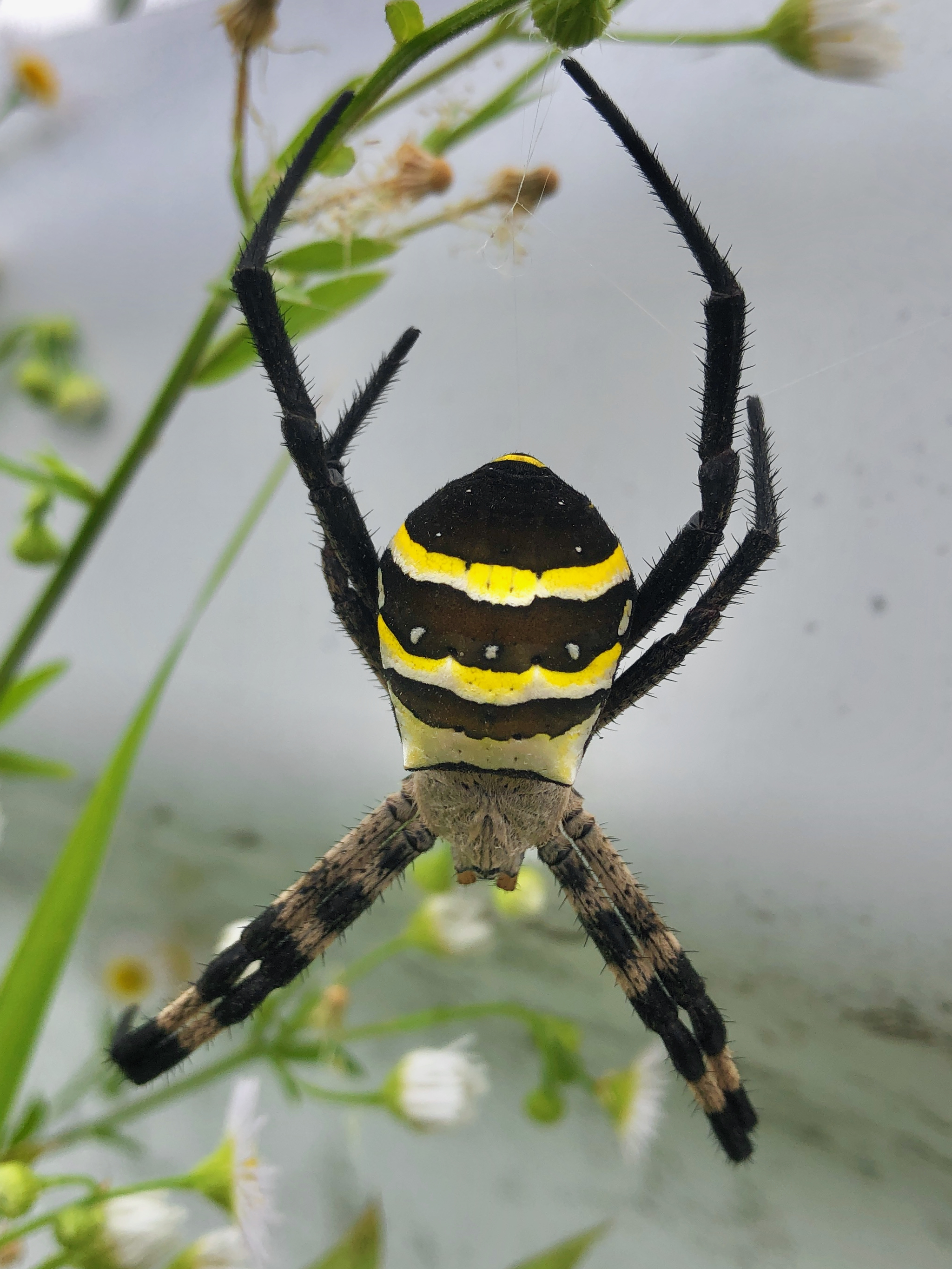
Argiope amoena

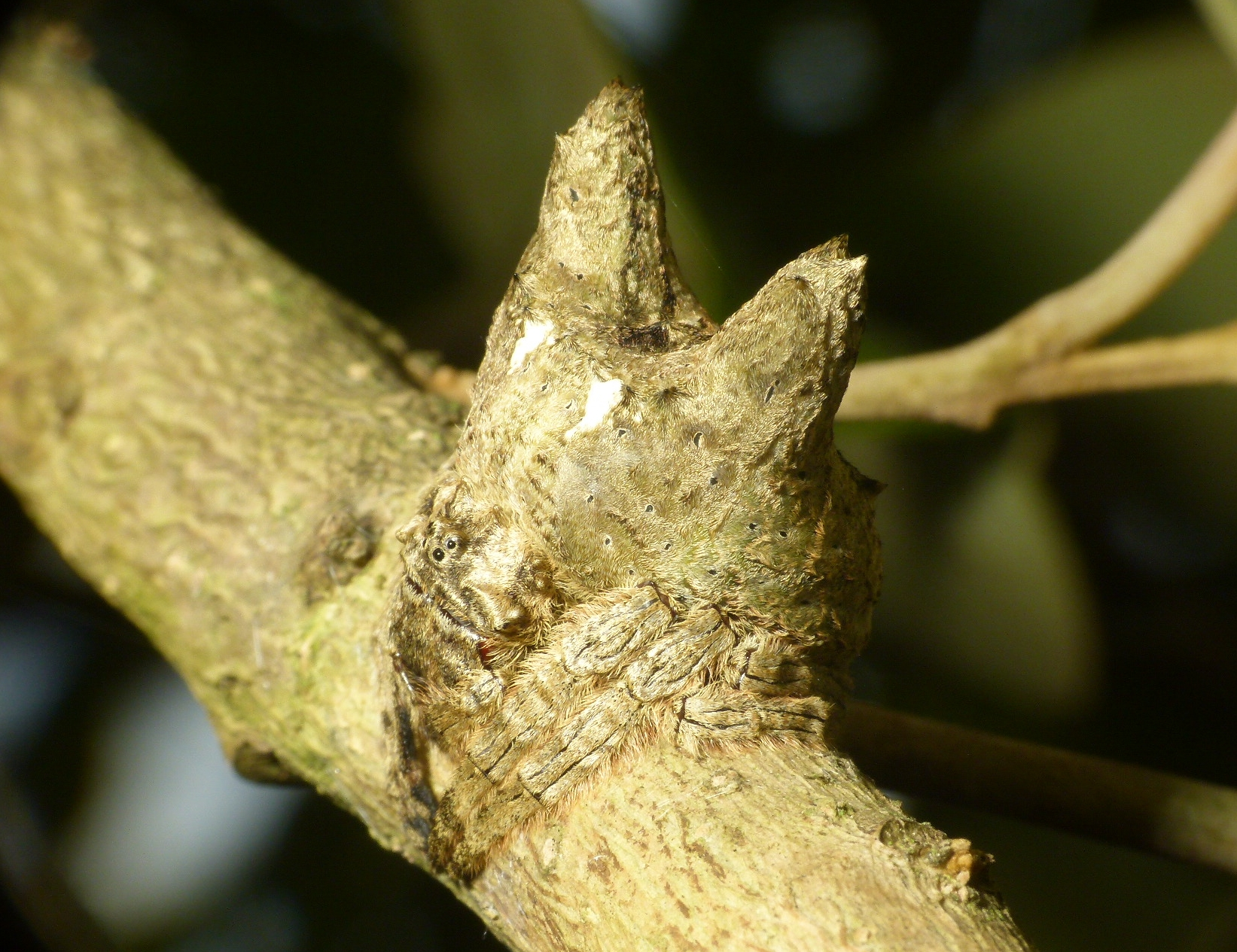
Poltys

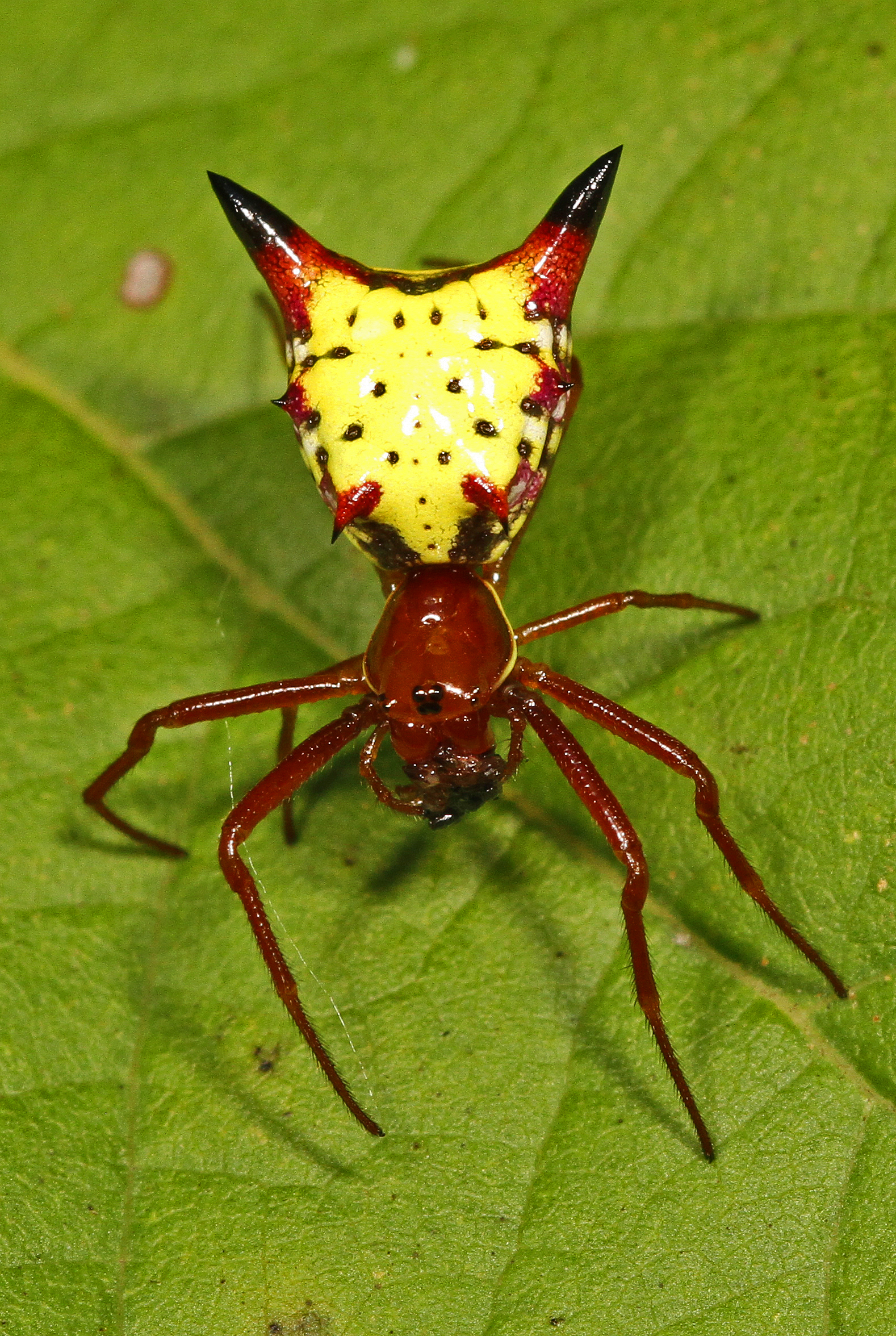
Micrathena sagittata

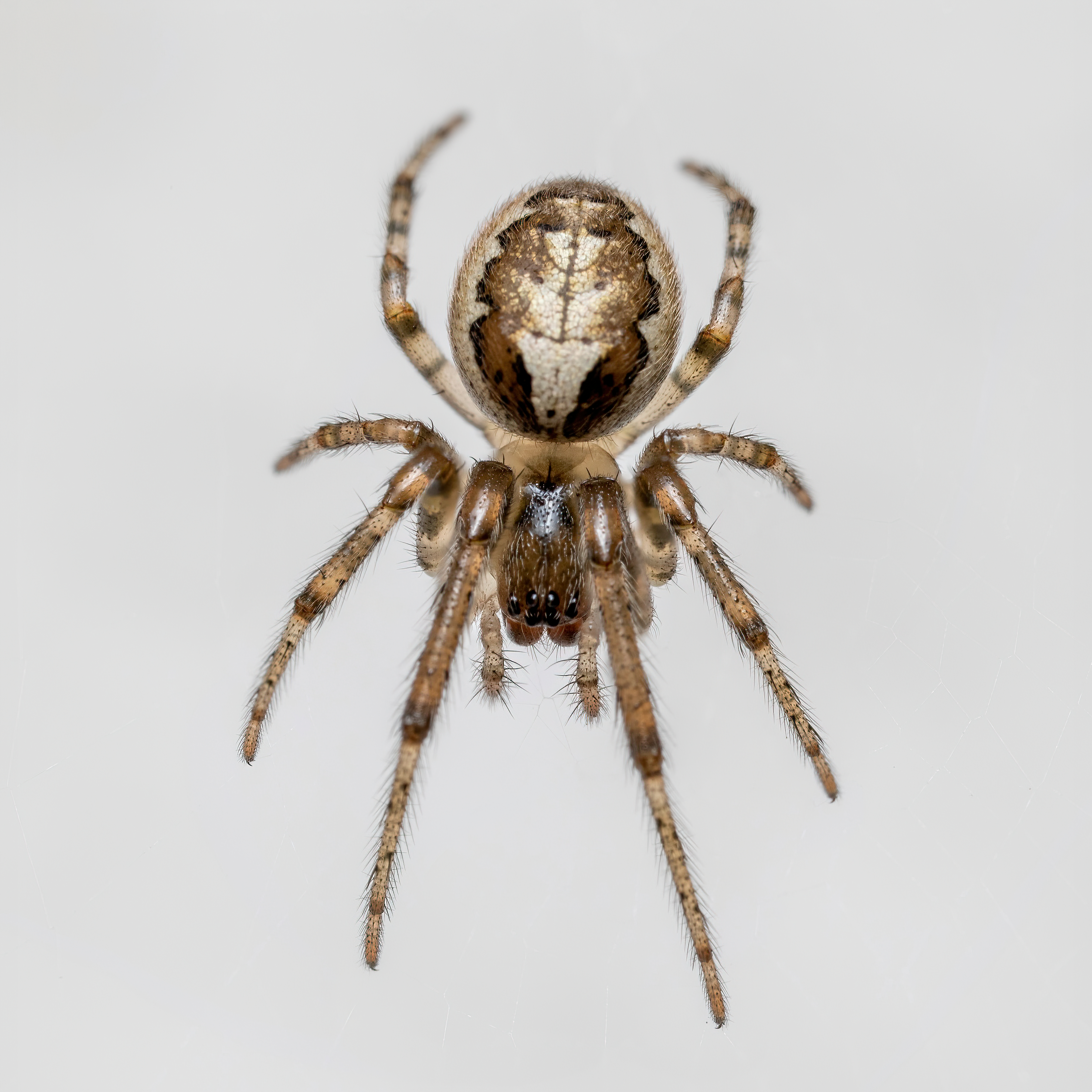
Zygiella x-notata

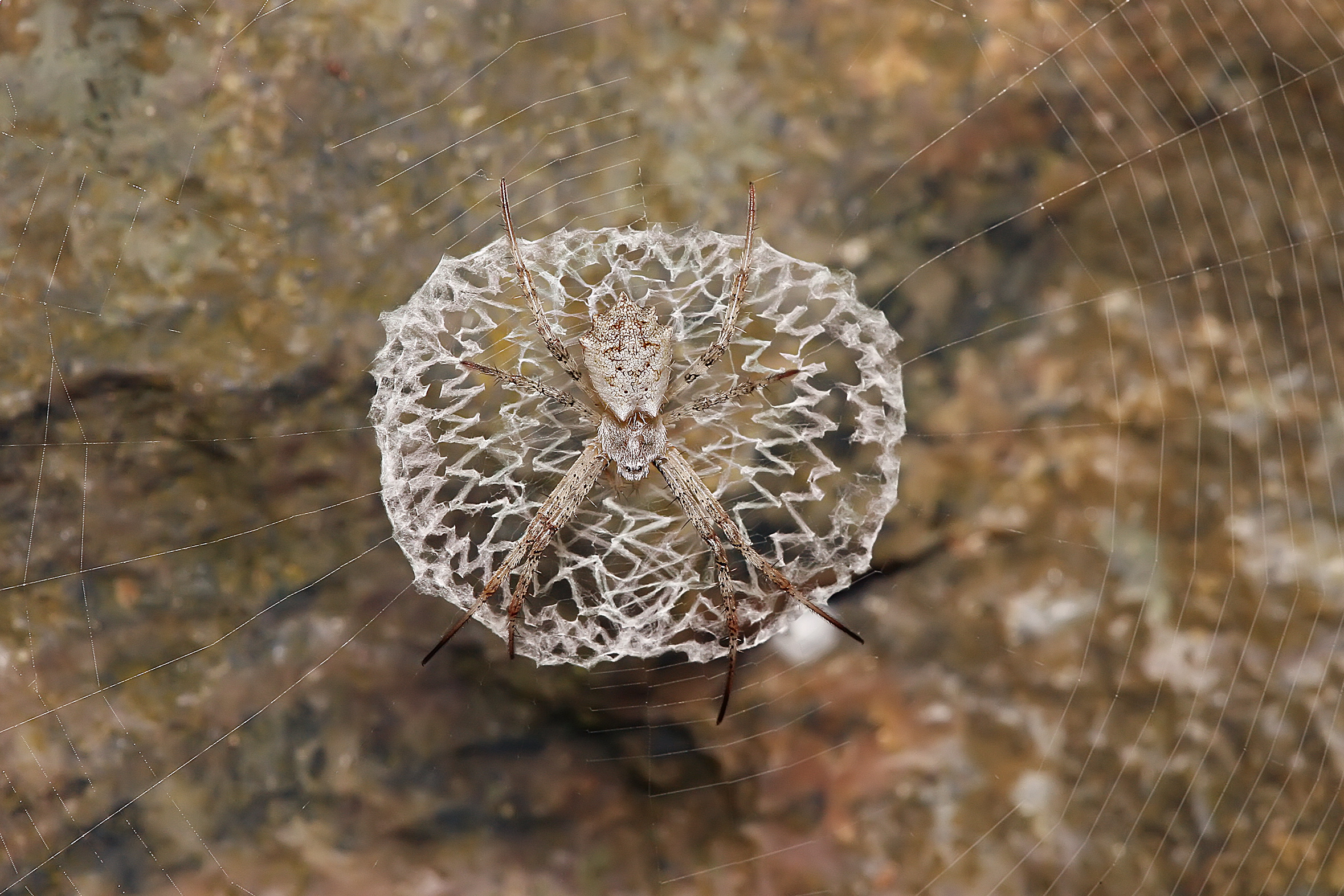
Argiope sp. sitting on the stabilimentum at the center of the web

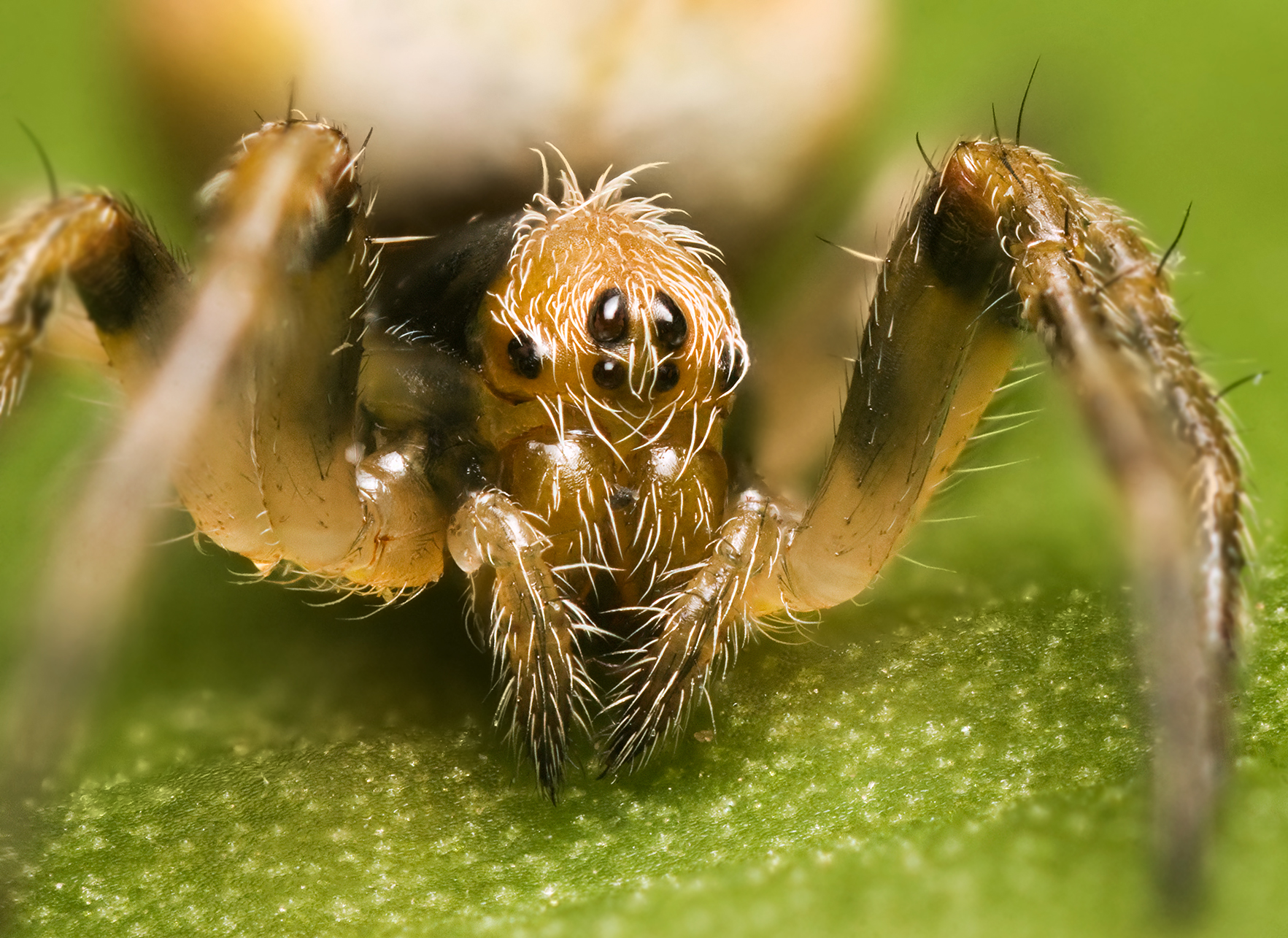
Close-up of the cephalothorax on Eriophora sp. (possibly E. heroine or E. pustuosa)

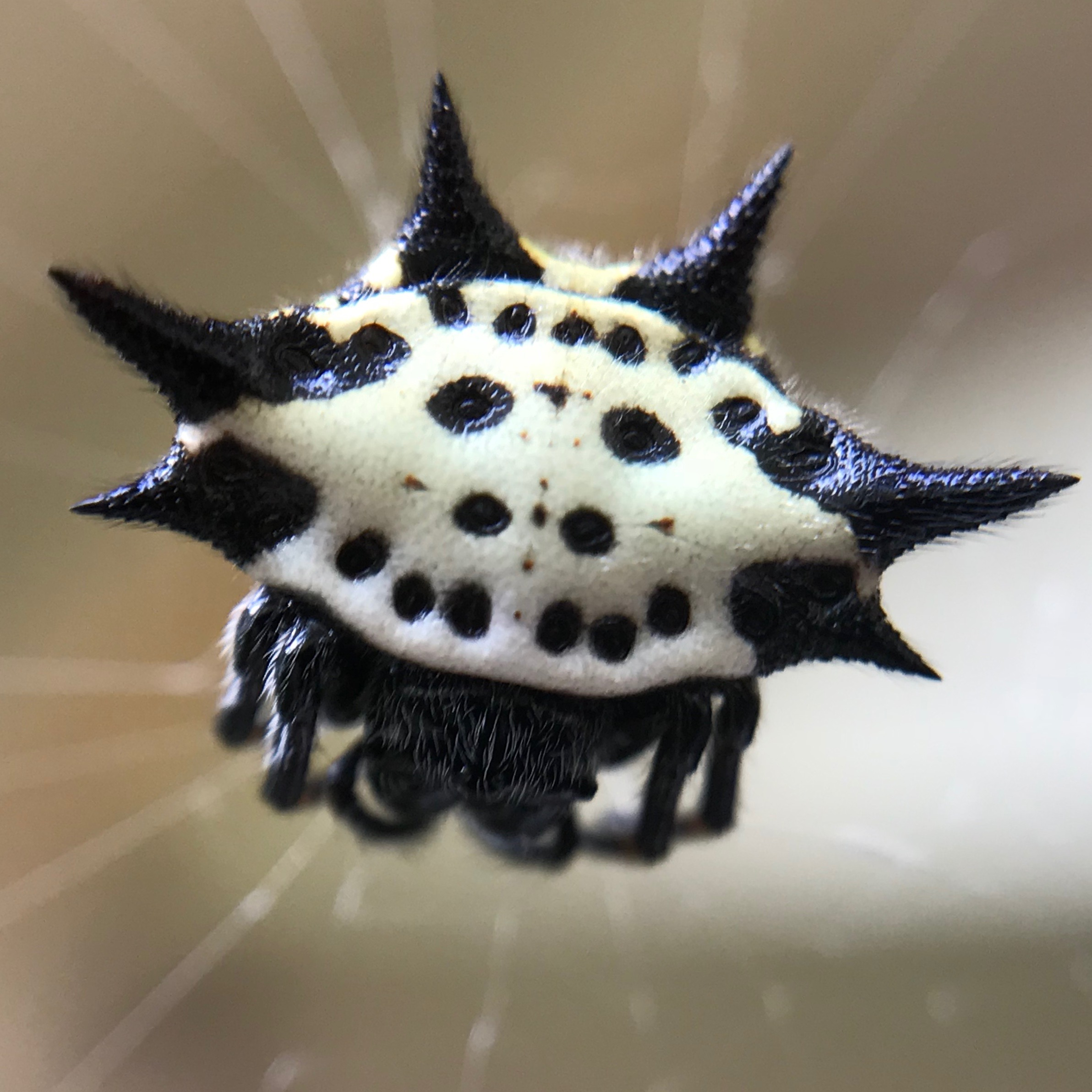
Gasteracantha cancriformis

As of November 2026, this family includes 200 genera and 3,182 species:

- Abba Castanheira & Framenau, 2023 – Australia (Queensland, New South Wales)
- Acacesia Simon, 1895 — South America, North America
- Acantharachne Tullgren, 1910 — Congo, Madagascar, Cameroon
- Acanthepeira Marx, 1883 — North America, Brazil, Cuba
- Acroaspis Karsch, 1878 — New Zealand, Australia
- Acrosomoides Simon, 1887 — Madagascar, Cameroon, Congo
- Actinacantha Simon, 1864 — Indonesia
- Actinosoma Holmberg, 1883 — Colombia, Argentina
- Aculepeira Chamberlin & Ivie, 1942 — North America, Central America, South America, Asia, Europe
- Acusilas Simon, 1895 — Asia
- Aethriscus Pocock, 1902 — Congo
- Aethrodiscus Strand, 1913 — Central Africa
- Aetrocantha Karsch, 1879 — Central Africa
- Afracantha Dahl, 1914 — Africa
- Agalenatea Archer, 1951 — Ethiopia, Asia
- Alenatea Song & Zhu, 1999 — Asia
- Allocyclosa Levi, 1999 — United States, Panama, Cuba
- Alpaida O. Pickard-Cambridge, 1889 — Central America, South America, Mexico, Caribbean
- Amazonepeira Levi, 1989 — South America
- Anepsion Strand, 1929 — Oceania, Asia
- Aoaraneus Tanikawa, Yamasaki & Petcharad, 2021 — China, Japan, Korea, Taiwan
- Arachnura Clerck, 1863
- Araneus Clerck, 1757
- Araniella Chamberlin & Ivie, 1942 — Palearctic
- Aranoethra Butler, 1873 — Africa
- Argiope Audouin, 1826 — Asia, Oceania, Africa, North America, South America, Costa Rica, Cuba, Portugal
- Artiphex Kallal & Hormiga, 2022 – Australia, New Caledonia
- Artonis Simon, 1895 — Myanmar, Ethiopia
- Aspidolasius Simon, 1887 — South America
- Augusta O. Pickard-Cambridge, 1877 — Madagascar
- Austracantha Dahl, 1914 — Australia
- Backobourkia Framenau, Dupérré, Blackledge & Vink, 2010 — Australia, New Zealand
- Bertrana Keyserling, 1884 — South America, Central America
- Bijoaraneus Tanikawa, Yamasaki & Petcharad, 2021 — Africa, Asia, Oceania
- Caerostris Thorell, 1868 — Africa, Asia
- Carepalxis L. Koch, 1872 — Oceania, South America, Mexico, Jamaica
- Celaenia Thorell, 1868 — Australia, New Zealand
- Cercidia Thorell, 1869 — Russia, Kazakhstan, India
- Chorizopes O. Pickard-Cambridge, 1871 — Asia, Madagascar
- Chorizopesoides Mi & Wang, 2018 — China, Vietnam
- Cladomelea Simon, 1895 — South Africa, Congo
- Clitaetra Simon, 1889 — Africa, Sri Lanka
- Cnodalia Thorell, 1890 — Indonesia, Japan
- Coelossia Simon, 1895 — Sierra Leone, Mauritius, Madagascar
- Colaranea Court & Forster, 1988 — New Zealand
- Colphepeira Archer, 1941 — United States, Mexico
- Courtaraneus Framenau, Vink, McQuillan & Simpson, 2022 — New Zealand
- Cryptaranea Court & Forster, 1988 — New Zealand
- Cyclosa Menge, 1866 — Caribbean, Asia, Oceania, South America, North America, Central America, Africa, Europe
- Cyphalonotus Simon, 1895 — Asia, Africa
- Cyrtarachne Thorell, 1868 — Asia, Africa, Oceania
- Cyrtobill Framenau & Scharff, 2009 — Australia
- Cyrtophora Simon, 1864 — Asia, Oceania, Dominican Republic, Costa Rica, South America, Africa
- Deione Thorell, 1898 — Myanmar
- Deliochus Simon, 1894 — Australia, Papua New Guinea
- Dolophones Walckenaer, 1837 — Australia, Indonesia
- Dubiepeira Levi, 1991 — South America
- Edricus O. Pickard-Cambridge, 1890 — Mexico, Panama, Ecuador
- Enacrosoma Mello-Leitão, 1932 — South America, Central America, Mexico
- Encyosaccus Simon, 1895 — South America
- Epeiroides Keyserling, 1885 — Costa Rica, Brazil
- Eriophora Simon, 1864 — North America, South America, Central America, Africa, Asia
- Eriovixia Archer, 1951 — Asia, Papua New Guinea, Africa
- Eustacesia Caporiacco, 1954 — French Guiana
- Eustala Simon, 1895 — South America, North America, Central America, Caribbean
- Exechocentrus Simon, 1889 — Madagascar
- Faradja Grasshoff, 1970 — Congo
- Friula O. Pickard-Cambridge, 1897 — Indonesia
- Galaporella Levi, 2009 — Ecuador
- Gasteracantha Sundevall, 1833 — Oceania, Asia, United States, Africa, Chile
- Gastroxya Benoit, 1962 — Africa
- Gea C. L. Koch, 1843 — Africa, Oceania, Asia, United States, Argentina
- Gibbaranea Archer, 1951 — Asia, Europe, Algeria
- Glyptogona Simon, 1884 — Sri Lanka, Italy, Israel
- Gnolus Simon, 1879 — Chile, Argentina
- Guizygiella Zhu, Kim & Song, 1997 — Asia
- Herennia Thorell, 1877 — Asia, Oceania
- Heterognatha Nicolet, 1849 — Chile
- Hingstepeira Levi, 1995 — South America
- Hortophora Framenau & Castanheira, 2021 — Oceania
- Hypognatha Guérin, 1839 — South America, Central America, Mexico, Trinidad
- Hypsacantha Dahl, 1914 — Africa
- Hypsosinga Ausserer, 1871 — Asia, North America, Greenland, Africa
- Ideocaira Simon, 1903 — South Africa
- Indoetra Kuntner, 2006 — Sri Lanka
- Isoxya Simon, 1885 — Africa, Yemen
- Kaira O. Pickard-Cambridge, 1889 — North America, South America, Cuba, Guatemala
- Kangaraneus Castanheira & Framenau, 2023 — Australia
- Kapogea Levi, 1997 — Mexico, South America, Central America
- Kilima Grasshoff, 1970 — Congo, Seychelles, Yemen
- Kongaraneus Mi, Wang & Feng, 2026 — China
- Larinia Simon, 1874 — Asia, Africa, South America, Europe, Oceania, North America
- Larinioides Caporiacco, 1934 — Asia, Europe, Northen Africa
- Lariniophora Framenau, 2011 — Australia
- Leviana Framenau & Kuntner, 2022 — Australia
- Leviaraneus Tanikawa & Petcharad, 2023 — Asia
- Leviellus Wunderlich, 2004 — Asia, France
- Lewisepeira Levi, 1993 — Panama, Mexico, Jamaica
- Macracantha Simon, 1864 — India, China, Indonesia
- Madacantha Emerit, 1970 — Madagascar
- Mahembea Grasshoff, 1970 — Central and East Africa
- Mangora O. Pickard-Cambridge, 1889 — Asia, North America, South America, Central America, Caribbean
- Mangrovia Framenau & Castanheira, 2022 — Australia
- Manogea Levi, 1997 — South America, Central America, Mexico
- Mastophora Holmberg, 1876 — South America, North America, Central America, Cuba
- Mecynogea Simon, 1903 — North America, South America, Cuba
- Megaraneus Lawrence, 1968 — Africa
- Melychiopharis Simon, 1895 — Brazil
- Metazygia F. O. Pickard-Cambridge, 1904 — South America, Central America, North America, Caribbean
- Metepeira F. O. Pickard-Cambridge, 1903 — North America, Caribbean, South America, Central America
- Micrathena Sundevall, 1833 — South America, Caribbean, Central America, North America
- Micrepeira Schenkel, 1953 — South America, Costa Rica
- Micropoltys Kulczyński, 1911 — Papua New Guinea, Australia
- Milonia Thorell, 1890 — Singapore, Indonesia, Myanmar
- Molinaranea Mello-Leitão, 1940 — Chile, Argentina
- Nemoscolus Simon, 1895 — Africa
- Nemosinga Caporiacco, 1947 — Tanzania
- Nemospiza Simon, 1903 — South Africa
- Neogea Levi, 1983 — Papua New Guinea, India, Indonesia
- Neoscona Simon, 1864 — Asia, Africa, Europe, Oceania, North America, Cuba, South America
- Nephila Leach, 1815 — Asia, Oceania, United States, Africa, South America
- Nephilengys L. Koch, 1872 — Asia, Oceania
- Nephilingis Kuntner, 2013 — South America, Africa
- Nicolepeira Levi, 2001 — Chile
- Novakiella Court & Forster, 1993 — Australia, New Zealand
- Novaranea Court & Forster, 1988 — Australia, New Zealand
- Nuctenea Simon, 1864 — Algeria, Asia, Europe
- Oarces Simon, 1879 — Brazil, Chile, Argentina
- Ocrepeira Marx, 1883 — South America, Central America, Caribbean, North America
- Ordgarius Keyserling, 1886 — Asia, Oceania
- Osmooka Kuntner, Yu & Bond, 2025 – Madagascar
- Paralarinia Grasshoff, 1970 — Congo, South Africa
- Paraplectana Brito Capello, 1867 — Asia, Africa
- Paraplectanoides Keyserling, 1886 — Australia
- Pararaneus Caporiacco, 1940 — Madagascar
- Paraverrucosa Mello-Leitão, 1939 — South America
- Parawixia F. O. Pickard-Cambridge, 1904 — Mexico, South America, Asia, Papua New Guinea, Central America, Trinidad
- Parazygiella Wunderlich, 2004 – Eurasia, North America
- Parmatergus Emerit, 1994 — Madagascar
- Pasilobus Simon, 1895 — Africa, Asia
- Pengaraneus Mi, Wang & Li, 2024 – China
- Perilla Thorell, 1895 — Myanmar, Vietnam, Malaysia
- Pherenice Thorell, 1899 — Cameroon
- Phonognatha Simon, 1894 — Australia
- Pitharatus Simon, 1895 — Malaysia, Indonesia
- Plebs Joseph & Framenau, 2012 — Oceania, Asia
- Poecilarcys Simon, 1895 — Tunisia
- Poecilopachys Simon, 1895 — Oceania
- Poltys C. L. Koch, 1843 — Asia, Africa, Oceania
- Popperaneus Cabra-García & Hormiga, 2020 — Brazil, Paraguay
- Porcataraneus Mi & Peng, 2011 — India, China
- Pozonia Schenkel, 1953 — Caribbean, Paraguay, Mexico, Panama
- Prasonica Simon, 1895 — Africa, Asia, Oceania
- Prasonicella Grasshoff, 1971 — Madagascar, Seychelles
- Pronoides Schenkel, 1936 — Asia
- Pronous Keyserling, 1881 — Malaysia, Mexico, Central America, South America, Madagascar
- Pseudartonis Simon, 1903 — Africa
- Pseudopsyllo Strand, 1916 — Cameroon
- Psyllo Thorell, 1899 — Cameroon, Congo
- Pycnacantha Blackwall, 1865 — Africa
- Quokkaraneus Castanheira & Framenau, 2022 – Australia
- Rubrepeira Levi, 1992 — Mexico, Brazil
- Salsa Framenau & Castanheira, 2022 — Australia, New Caledonia, Papua New Guinea
- Scoloderus Simon, 1887 — Belize, North America, Argentina, Caribbean
- Sedasta Simon, 1894 — West Africa
- Singa C. L. Koch, 1836 — Africa, Asia, North America, Europe
- Singafrotypa Benoit, 1962 — Africa
- Siwa Grasshoff, 1970 — Asia
- Socca Framenau, Castanheira & Vink, 2022 — Australia
- Songaraneus Mi, Wang & Li, 2024 – China, Korea, Japan, Singapore
- Spilasma Simon, 1897 — South America, Honduras
- Spinepeira Levi, 1995 — Peru
- Spintharidius Simon, 1893 — South America, Cuba
- Taczanowskia Keyserling, 1879 — Mexico, South America
- Talthybia Thorell, 1898 — China, Myanmar
- Tangaraneus Mi, Wang & Li, 2024 – China
- Tatepeira Levi, 1995 — South America, Honduras
- Telaprocera Harmer & Framenau, 2008 — Australia
- Testudinaria Taczanowski, 1879 — South America, Panama
- Thelacantha Hasselt, 1882 — Madagascar, Asia, Australia
- Thorellina Berg, 1899 — Myanmar, Papua New Guinea
- Togacantha Dahl, 1914 — Africa
- Trichonephila Dahl, 1911 — Africa, Asia, Oceania, North America, South America
- Umbonata Grasshoff, 1971 — Tanzania
- Ursa Simon, 1895 — Asia, South America, South Africa
- Venomius Rossi, Castanheira, Baptista & Framenau, 2023 — Australia
- Verrucosa McCook, 1888 — North America, Panama, South America, Australia
- Wagneriana F. O. Pickard-Cambridge, 1904 — South America, Central America, Caribbean, North America
- Wangaraneus Mi, Wang & Li, 2024 – China, Vietnam
- Witica O. Pickard-Cambridge, 1895 — Cuba, Mexico, Peru
- Wixia O. Pickard-Cambridge, 1882 — Brazil, Guyana, Bolivia
- Xylethrus Simon, 1895 — South America, Mexico, Jamaica, Panama
- Yaginumia Archer, 1960 — Asia
- Yinaraneus Mi, Wang & Li, 2024 – China
- Zealaranea Court & Forster, 1988 — New Zealand
- Zhuaraneus Mi, Wang & Li, 2024 – China, Vietnam
- Zilla C. L. Koch, 1834 — Azerbaijan, India, China
- Zygiella F. O. Pickard-Cambridge, 1902 — North America, Asia, Ukraine, South America
