= Herbert Walter Levi =

American arachnologist (1921–2014)

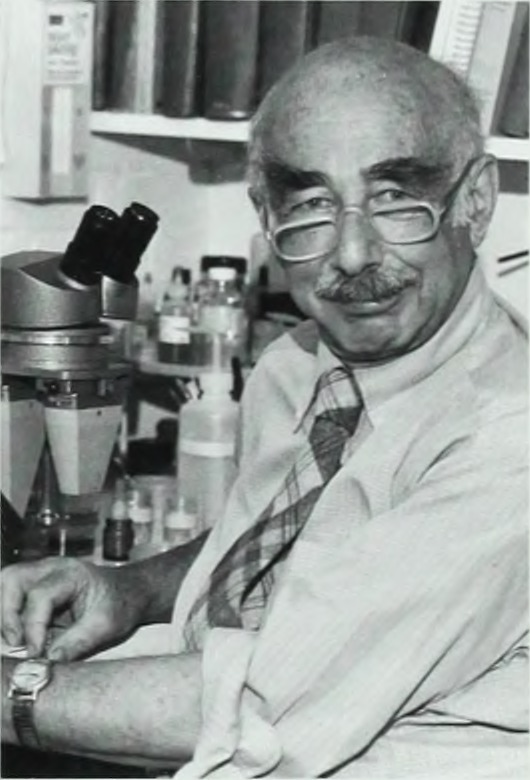
Herbert Walter Levi at his scope

Herbert Walter Levi (January 3, 1921 – November 3, 2014) was professor emeritus of zoology and curator of arachnology at the Museum of Comparative Zoology, Harvard University.

He was born in Germany, and was educated there and at Leighton Park School, Reading in England. He then received his higher education at the University of Connecticut and the University of Wisconsin. Levi authored about 150 scientific papers on spiders and on biological conservation. He is the author of the popular Golden Guide Spiders and their Kin, with Lorna Rose Levi (his wife) and Herbert Zim.

Levi received the 2007 Eugene Simon Award from the International Society of Arachnology "for his immense influence on US spider research". He was an elected honorary member of the American Arachnological Society.

Levi was an editorial board member for the Journal of Arachnology.

The pseudoscorpion genus Levichelifer, the spider species Anisaedus levii and the whip spider species Phrynus levii are named in his honor.

== Selected publications ==
- Levi, Herbert W.; et al. (1981). A Guide to Spiders and Their Kin. New York: Golden Press. ISBN 0-307-24021-5.
