= List of Araneidae species: B–F =

This page lists all described species of the spider family Araneidae as of Dec. 20, 2016, that start with letters B through F.

== Backobourkia ==
Backobourkia Framenau et al., 2010

- Backobourkia brouni (Urquhart, 1885) — Australia, New Zealand
- Backobourkia collina (Keyserling, 1886) — Australia
- Backobourkia heroine (L. Koch, 1871) (type species) — Australia, New Caledonia, Norfolk Islands, possibly New Zealand

== Bertrana ==
Bertrana Keyserling, 1884

- Bertrana abbreviata (Keyserling, 1879) — Colombia
- Bertrana arena Levi, 1989 — Costa Rica
- Bertrana benuta Levi, 1994 — Colombia
- Bertrana elinguis (Keyserling, 1883) — Ecuador, Peru, Brazil, French Guiana
- Bertrana laselva Levi, 1989 — Costa Rica
- Bertrana nancho Levi, 1989 — Peru
- Bertrana planada Levi, 1989 — Colombia, Ecuador
- Bertrana poa Levi, 1994 — Ecuador
- Bertrana rufostriata Simon, 1893 — Venezuela, Brazil
- Bertrana striolata Keyserling, 1884 (type species) — Costa Rica to Argentina
- Bertrana urahua Levi, 1994 — Ecuador
- Bertrana vella Levi, 1989 — Panama, Colombia

== Caerostris ==
Caerostris Thorell, 1868

- Caerostris almae Gregorič, 2015 - Madagascar
- Caerostris bojani Gregorič, 2015 - Madagascar
- Caerostris corticosa Pocock, 1902 — South Africa
- Caerostris cowani Butler, 1882 — Madagascar
- Caerostris darwini Kuntner & Agnarsson, 2010 — Madagascar
- Caerostris ecclesiigera Butler, 1882 — Madagascar
- Caerostris extrusa Butler, 1882 — Madagascar
- Caerostris hirsuta (Simon, 1895) — Madagascar
- Caerostris indica Strand, 1915 — Myanmar
- Caerostris linnaeus Gregorič, 2015 - Mozambique
- Caerostris mayottensis Grasshoff, 1984 — Comoro Islands
- Caerostris mitralis (Vinson, 1863) (type species) — Central Africa, Madagascar
- Caerostris pero Gregorič, 2015 - Madagascar
- Caerostris sexcuspidata (Fabricius, 1793) — Africa, Madagascar, Comoro Islands, Aldabra
- Caerostris sumatrana Strand, 1915 — India to China, Borneo
- Caerostris tinamaze Gregorič, 2015 - South Africa
- Caerostris vicina (Blackwall, 1866) — Central, Southern Africa
- Caerostris wallacei Gregorič, Blackledge, Agnarsson & Kuntner, 2015 - Madagascar

== Carepalxis ==
Carepalxis L. Koch, 1872

- Carepalxis beelzebub (Hasselt, 1873) — Victoria
- Carepalxis bilobata Keyserling, 1886 — Queensland
- Carepalxis camelus Simon, 1895 — Paraguay, Argentina
- Carepalxis coronata (Rainbow, 1896) — New South Wales
- Carepalxis lichensis Rainbow, 1916 — Queensland
- Carepalxis montifera L. Koch, 1872 (type species) — Queensland
- Carepalxis perpera (Petrunkevitch, 1911) — Mexico
- Carepalxis poweri Rainbow, 1916 — New South Wales
- Carepalxis salobrensis Simon, 1895 — Jamaica, Mexico to Brazil
- Carepalxis suberosa Thorell, 1881 — New Guinea
- Carepalxis tricuspidata Chrysanthus, 1961 — New Guinea
- Carepalxis tuberculata Keyserling, 1886 — Queensland, New South Wales

== Celaenia ==
Celaenia Thorell, 1868

- Celaenia atkinsoni (O. P.-Cambridge, 1879) — Australia, Tasmania, New Zealand
- Celaenia calotoides Rainbow, 1908 — New South Wales
- Celaenia distincta (O. P.-Cambridge, 1869) — New South Wales, Tasmania
- Celaenia dubia (O. P.-Cambridge, 1869) — New South Wales, Victoria
- Celaenia excavata (L. Koch, 1867) (type species) — Australia, Tasmania
- Celaenia hectori (O. P.-Cambridge, 1879) — New Zealand
- Celaenia olivacea (Urquhart, 1885) — New Zealand
- Celaenia penna (Urquhart, 1887) — New Zealand
- Celaenia tuberosa (Urquhart, 1889) — New Zealand
- Celaenia tumidosa Urquhart, 1891 — Tasmania
- Celaenia voraginosa Urquhart, 1891 — Tasmania

== Cercidia ==
Cercidia Thorell, 1869

- Cercidia levii Marusik, 1985 — Kazakhstan
- Cercidia prominens (Westring, 1851) (type species) — Holarctic
- Cercidia punctigera Simon, 1889 — India

== Chorizopes ==
Chorizopes O. P.-Cambridge, 1870

- Chorizopes albus Mi, Wang & Peng, 2016 - China
- Chorizopes anjanes Tikader, 1965 — India
- Chorizopes antongilensis Emerit, 1997 — Madagascar
- Chorizopes calciope (Simon, 1895) — India
- Chorizopes congener O. P.-Cambridge, 1885 — India
- Chorizopes dicavus Yin et al., 1990 — China
- Chorizopes frontalis O. P.-Cambridge, 1870 (type species) — Sri Lanka to Sumatra
- Chorizopes goosus Yin et al., 1990 — China
- Chorizopes kastoni Gajbe & Gajbe, 2004 — India
- Chorizopes khandaricus Gajbe, 2005 — India
- Chorizopes khanjanes Tikader, 1965 — India, China
- Chorizopes khedaensis Reddy & Patel, 1993 — India
- Chorizopes longus Mi, Wang & Peng, 2016 - China
- Chorizopes madagascariensis Emerit, 1997 — Madagascar
- Chorizopes mucronatus Simon, 1895 — Sri Lanka
- Chorizopes nipponicus Yaginuma, 1963 — China, Korea, Japan
- Chorizopes orientalis Simon, 1909 — Vietnam
- Chorizopes pateli Reddy & Patel, 1993 — India
- Chorizopes quadrituberculata Roy, Sen, Saha & Raychaudhuri, 2014 - India
- Chorizopes rajanpurensis Mukhtar & Tahir, 2013 — Pakistan
- Chorizopes shimenensis Yin & Peng, 1994 — China
- Chorizopes stoliczkae O. P.-Cambridge, 1885 — India
- Chorizopes tikaderi Sadana & Kaur, 1974 — India
- Chorizopes trimamillatus Schenkel, 1963 — China
- Chorizopes tumens Yin et al., 1990 — China
- Chorizopes wulingensis Yin, Wang & Xie, 1994 — China
- Chorizopes zepherus Zhu & Song, 1994 — China

== Cladomelea ==
Cladomelea Simon, 1895

- Cladomelea akermani Hewitt, 1923 — South Africa
- Cladomelea debeeri Roff & Dippenaar-Schoeman, 2004 — South Africa
- Cladomelea longipes (O. P.-Cambridge, 1877) (type species) — Congo
- Cladomelea ornata Hirst, 1907 — Central Africa

== Clitaetra ==
Clitaetra Simon, 1889

- Clitaetra clathrata Simon, 1907 — West Africa
- Clitaetra episinoides Simon, 1889 — Comoro Islands
- Clitaetra irenae Kuntner, 2006 — South Africa
- Clitaetra perroti Simon, 1894 — Madagascar
- Clitaetra simoni Benoit, 1962 — Congo
- Clitaetra thisbe Simon, 1903 — Sri Lanka

== Cnodalia ==
Cnodalia Thorell, 1890

- Cnodalia ampliabdominis (Song, Zhang & Zhu, 2006) — China
- Cnodalia flavescens Mi, Peng & Yin, 2010 — China
- Cnodalia harpax Thorell, 1890 (type species) — Sumatra, Japan
- Cnodalia quadrituberculata Mi, Peng & Yin, 2010 — China

== Coelossia ==
Coelossia Simon, 1895

- Coelossia aciculata Simon, 1895 (type species) — Sierra Leone
- Coelossia trituberculata Simon, 1903 — Mauritius, Madagascar

== Colaranea ==
Colaranea Court & Forster, 1988

- Colaranea brunnea Court & Forster, 1988 — New Zealand
- Colaranea melanoviridis Court & Forster, 1988 — New Zealand
- Colaranea verutum (Urquhart, 1887) — New Zealand
- Colaranea viriditas (Urquhart, 1887) (type species) — New Zealand

== Collina ==
Collina Urquhart, 1891

- Collina glabicira Urquhart, 1891 — Tasmania

== Colphepeira ==
Colphepeira Archer, 1941

- Colphepeira catawba (Banks, 1911) — USA, Mexico

== Cryptaranea ==
Cryptaranea Court & Forster, 1988

- Cryptaranea albolineata (Urquhart, 1893) — New Zealand
- Cryptaranea atrihastula (Urquhart, 1891) — New Zealand
- Cryptaranea invisibilis (Urquhart, 1892) (type species) — New Zealand
- Cryptaranea stewartensis Court & Forster, 1988 — New Zealand
- Cryptaranea subalpina Court & Forster, 1988 — New Zealand
- Cryptaranea subcompta (Urquhart, 1887) — New Zealand
- Cryptaranea venustula (Urquhart, 1891) — New Zealand

== Cyclosa ==
Cyclosa Menge, 1866 As of September 2025, this genus includes 178 species and two subspecies:

- Cyclosa alayoni Levi, 1999 – Cuba, Puerto Rico
- Cyclosa alba Tanikawa, 1992 – Japan
- Cyclosa albisternis Simon, 1888 – India, (mainland, Andaman Is.), Introduced to Hawaii
- Cyclosa albopunctata Kulczyński, 1901 – Eritrea, Indonesia (New Guinea), New Caledonia
- Cyclosa algerica Simon, 1885 – Portugal, Spain, France, Algeria, Tunisia, Italy (Sicily), Greece, Turkey, Azerbaijan, Iran
- Cyclosa anatipes (Keyserling, 1887) – Australia (Queensland), Palau
- Cyclosa andinas Levi, 1999 – Colombia, Ecuador
- Cyclosa angusta Tanikawa, 1992 – Japan
- Cyclosa anjing Mi, Wang & Li, 2024 – China
- Cyclosa apoblepta (Rainbow, 1916) – Australia (Queensland)
- Cyclosa argentaria (Rainbow, 1916) – Australia (Queensland)
- Cyclosa argentata Tanikawa & Ono, 1993 – Taiwan
- Cyclosa argenteoalba Bösenberg & Strand, 1906 – Japan, Korea, China, Taiwan, Russia, (Far East)
- Cyclosa atrata Bösenberg & Strand, 1906 – China, Korea, Japan, Russia, (Far East)
- Cyclosa baakea Barrion & Litsinger, 1995 – Philippines
- Cyclosa bacilliformis Simon, 1908 – Australia (Western Australia)
- Cyclosa banawensis Barrion & Litsinger, 1995 – Philippines
- Cyclosa berlandi Levi, 1999 – United States, Hispaniola, Ecuador
- Cyclosa bianchoria Yin, Wang, Xie & Peng, 1990 – China
- Cyclosa bifida (Doleschall, 1859) – India, Philippines and Indonesia (New Guinea)
- Cyclosa bifurcata (Walckenaer, 1841) – Costa Rica, Hispaniola, Argentina
- Cyclosa bihamata F. Zhang, M. S. Zhang & Zhu, 2010 – China
- Cyclosa bilobata Sen, Saha & Raychaudhuri, 2012 – India
- Cyclosa bituberculata Biswas & Raychaudhuri, 1998 – Bangladesh
- Cyclosa bulla Tanikawa & Petcharad, 2018 – Thailand, Singapore, Brunei
- Cyclosa bulleri (Thorell, 1881) – Papua New Guinea
- Cyclosa cajamarca Levi, 1999 – Peru
- Cyclosa caligata (Thorell, 1890) – Indonesia (Sumatra)
- Cyclosa camargoi Levi, 1999 – Brazil
- Cyclosa camelodes (Thorell, 1878) – Seychelles, Indonesia (New Guinea)
- Cyclosa caroli (Hentz, 1850) – United States, Caribbean, Bolivia
- Cyclosa centrifaciens Hingston, 1927 – Myanmar
- Cyclosa centrodes (Thorell, 1887) – India, Singapore
- Cyclosa cephalodina Song & Liu, 1996 – China
- Cyclosa chichawatniensis Mukhtar & Mushtaq, 2005 – Pakistan
- Cyclosa circumlucens Simon, 1907 – Guinea-Bissau, São Tomé and Príncipe
- Cyclosa concolor Caporiacco, 1933 – Libya
- Cyclosa confraga (Thorell, 1893) – Pakistan, India, Bangladesh, Singapore, Vietnam
- Cyclosa confusa Bösenberg & Strand, 1906 – China, Korea, Taiwan, Japan
- Cyclosa conica (Pallas, 1772) – North America, Europe, Turkey, Caucasus, Russia (Europe to Far East), Iran, Central Asia, China. Introduced to South Africa (type species)
- Cyclosa conigera F. O. Pickard-Cambridge, 1904 – Mexico, Honduras
- Cyclosa coylei Levi, 1999 – Mexico, Guatemala
- Cyclosa cucurbitoria (Yin, Wang, Xie & Peng, 1990) – China, Thailand
- Cyclosa cucurbitula Simon, 1900 – Hawaii
- Cyclosa curiraba Levi, 1999 – Bolivia
- Cyclosa cylindrata Yin, Zhu & Wang, 1995 – China
- Cyclosa cylindrifaciens Hingston, 1927 – Myanmar
- Cyclosa damingensis Xie, Yin & Kim, 1995 – China
- Cyclosa daodai Mi, Wang & Li, 2024 – China
- Cyclosa deserticola Levy, 1998 – Egypt, Israel
- Cyclosa dianasilvae Levi, 1999 – Ecuador, Peru
- Cyclosa diversa (O. Pickard-Cambridge, 1894) – Mexico, Cuba, Argentina
- Cyclosa dives Simon, 1877 – China, Philippines
- Cyclosa donking Levi, 1999 – Bolivia
- Cyclosa dosbukolea Barrion & Litsinger, 1995 – Philippines
- Cyclosa durango Levi, 1999 – Mexico
- Cyclosa elongata Biswas & Raychaudhuri, 1998 – Bangladesh
- Cyclosa espumoso Levi, 1999 – Brazil
- Cyclosa fililineata Hingston, 1932 – Panama, Argentina
- Cyclosa formosa Karsch, 1879 – West Africa
- Cyclosa formosana Tanikawa & Ono, 1993 – Taiwan
- Cyclosa ginnaga Yaginuma, 1959 – Russia (Far East), Korea, Japan, China, Taiwan
- Cyclosa gossypiata Keswani, 2013 – India
- Cyclosa groppalii Pesarini, 1998 – Spain (incl. Balearic Is.), Greece (Crete)
- Cyclosa gulinensis Xie, Yin & Kim, 1995 – China
- Cyclosa haiti Levi, 1999 – Hispaniola, Jamaica, Puerto Rico (Mona Is.)
- Cyclosa hamulata Tanikawa, 1992 – Russia (Far East), Japan
- Cyclosa hexatuberculata Tikader, 1982 – Pakistan, India
- Cyclosa huila Levi, 1999 – Colombia
- Cyclosa imias Levi, 1999 – Cuba
- Cyclosa inca Levi, 1999 – Colombia, Argentina
- Cyclosa informis Yin, Zhu & Wang, 1995 – China
- Cyclosa insulana (Costa, 1834) – Mediterranean, Japan, India, Papua New Guinea, Australia, St. Helena, South Africa, Eswatini
- Cyclosa ipilea Barrion & Litsinger, 1995 – Philippines
- Cyclosa jalapa Levi, 1999 – Mexico
- Cyclosa japonica Bösenberg & Strand, 1906 – Russia (Far East), China, Korea, Taiwan, Japan
- Cyclosa jose Levi, 1999 – Costa Rica
- Cyclosa kashmirica Caporiacco, 1934 – Pakistan (Karakorum)
- Cyclosa kibonotensis Tullgren, 1910 – Central, East Africa, Seychelles
- Cyclosa koi Tanikawa & Ono, 1993 – Taiwan
- Cyclosa krusa Barrion & Litsinger, 1995 – Pakistan, India, Philippines
- Cyclosa kumadai Tanikawa, 1992 – Russia (Far East), Korea, Japan
- Cyclosa laticauda Bösenberg & Strand, 1906 – China, Korea, Taiwan, Japan
- Cyclosa lawrencei Caporiacco, 1949 – Kenya
- Cyclosa libertad Levi, 1999 – Ecuador, Peru
- Cyclosa lichensis (Rainbow, 1916) – Australia (Queensland)
- Cyclosa litoralis (L. Koch, 1867) – Vanuatu, Samoa, Fiji, Tahiti
- Cyclosa longicauda (Taczanowski, 1878) – Colombia, Argentina
- Cyclosa longquan Mi, Wang & Li, 2024 – China
- Cyclosa machadinho Levi, 1999 – Brazil, Argentina
- Cyclosa maderiana Kulczyński, 1899 – Madeira, Canary Islands
- Cyclosa maritima Tanikawa, 1992 – Japan
- Cyclosa mavaca Levi, 1999 – Colombia, Venezuela
- Cyclosa meruensis Tullgren, 1910 – Tanzania
- Cyclosa micula (Thorell, 1893) – India, Singapore
- Cyclosa minora Yin, Zhu & Wang, 1995 – China
- Cyclosa mocoa Levi, 1999 – Colombia
- Cyclosa mohini Dyal, 1935 – Pakistan
- Cyclosa monteverde Levi, 1999 – Costa Rica, Panama
- Cyclosa monticola Bösenberg & Strand, 1906 – China, Korea, Taiwan, Japan, Russia, (Far East)
- Cyclosa moonduensis Tikader, 1963 – India
- Cyclosa morretes Levi, 1999 – Brazil
- Cyclosa mulmeinensis (Thorell, 1887) – Asia (without Russia)
- Cyclosa neilensis Tikader, 1977 – India
- Cyclosa nevada Levi, 1999 – Colombia
- Cyclosa nigra Yin, Wang, Xie & Peng, 1990 – China, Vietnam
- Cyclosa nodosa (O. Pickard-Cambridge, 1889) – Guatemala, Costa Rica
- Cyclosa norihisai Tanikawa, 1992 – China, Japan
- Cyclosa oatesi (Thorell, 1892) – Myanmar (Table Is.)
- Cyclosa octotuberculata Karsch, 1879 – China, Korea, Taiwan, Japan
- Cyclosa oculata (Walckenaer, 1802) – Europe, Russia (Europe to Far East), Caucasus, Kazakhstan, Central Asia, China. Introduced to South Africa, Hawaii
- Cyclosa odateana Kishida, 1915 – Japan
- Cyclosa ojeda Levi, 1999 – Curaçao
- Cyclosa okumae Tanikawa, 1992 – Russia (Far East), Korea, Japan
- Cyclosa olivenca Levi, 1999 – Brazil
- Cyclosa olorina Simon, 1900 – Hawaii
- Cyclosa omonaga Tanikawa, 1992 – China, Korea, Taiwan, Japan
- Cyclosa onoi Tanikawa, 1992 – Russia (Far East), China, Korea, Japan
- Cyclosa oseret Levi, 1999 – Brazil
- Cyclosa otsomarka Barrion & Litsinger, 1995 – Philippines
- Cyclosa pantanal Levi, 1999 – Brazil
- Cyclosa parangmulmeinensis Barrion & Litsinger, 1995 – Philippines
- Cyclosa parangtarugoa Barrion & Litsinger, 1995 – Philippines
- Cyclosa paupercula Simon, 1893 – Malaysia (Borneo)
- Cyclosa pedropalo Levi, 1999 – Colombia
- Cyclosa pellaxoides Roewer, 1942 – Singapore
- Cyclosa pentatuberculata Yin, Zhu & Wang, 1995 – China
- Cyclosa perkinsi Simon, 1900 – Hawaii
- Cyclosa picchu Levi, 1999 – Peru
- Cyclosa pichilinque Levi, 1999 – Mexico
- Cyclosa poweri (Rainbow, 1916) – Australia (New South Wales)
- Cyclosa pseudoculata Schenkel, 1936 – China
- Cyclosa psylla (Thorell, 1887) – Myanmar, Japan
- Cyclosa punctata Keyserling, 1879 – Brazil
- Cyclosa punjabiensis Ghafoor & Beg, 2002 – Pakistan
- Cyclosa purnai Keswani, 2013 – India
- Cyclosa pusilla Simon, 1880 – New Caledonia
- Cyclosa quinqueguttata (Thorell, 1881) – India, Bhutan, Myanmar, China, Taiwan
- Cyclosa reniformis Zhu, Lian & Chen, 2006 – China
- Cyclosa rostrata Zhou & Zhang, 2017 – China
- Cyclosa rubronigra Caporiacco, 1947 – Costa Rica, Brazil
- Cyclosa sachikoae Tanikawa, 1992 – Japan, China
- Cyclosa saismarka Barrion & Litsinger, 1995 – Pakistan, Philippines
- Cyclosa sanctibenedicti (Vinson, 1863) – Réunion
- Cyclosa santafe Levi, 1999 – Colombia
- Cyclosa sedeculata Karsch, 1879 – Russia (Far East), China, Korea, Japan
- Cyclosa senticauda Zhu & Wang, 1994 – China
- Cyclosa serena Levi, 1999 – Chile, Argentina
- Cyclosa seriata (Thorell, 1881) – Indonesia (Java)
- Cyclosa shinoharai Tanikawa & Ono, 1993 – Taiwan
- Cyclosa sierrae Simon, 1870 – Southern Europe, Hungary, Ukraine, Turkey, Caucasus, Iran
- Cyclosa simoni Tikader, 1982 – India
- Cyclosa simplicicauda Simon, 1900 – Hawaii
  - C. s. rufescens Simon, 1900 – Hawaii
- Cyclosa spirifera Simon, 1889 – Pakistan, India
- Cyclosa tamanaco Levi, 1999 – Trinidad
- Cyclosa tapetifaciens Hingston, 1932 – Panama, Argentina
- Cyclosa tardipes (Thorell, 1895) – Myanmar
  - C. t. ignava (Thorell, 1895) – Myanmar
- Cyclosa tauraai Berland, 1933 – French Polynesia (Marquesas Is., Society Is.)
- Cyclosa teresa Levi, 1999 – Brazil
- Cyclosa tricolor (Leardi, 1902) – Philippines
- Cyclosa trilobata (Urquhart, 1885) – Australia, Tasmania, New Zealand
- Cyclosa tripartita Tullgren, 1910 – Tanzania
- Cyclosa triquetra Simon, 1895 – Mexico, Caribbean, Peru
- Cyclosa tropica Biswas & Raychaudhuri, 1998 – Bangladesh
- Cyclosa tuberascens Simon, 1906 – India
- Cyclosa turbinata (Walckenaer, 1841) – United States, Panama, West Indies, Galapagos. Introduced to Hawaii
- Cyclosa turvo Levi, 1999 – Brazil
- Cyclosa vallata (Keyserling, 1886) – China, Korea, Taiwan, Japan, Papua New Guinea, Australia (Queensland)
- Cyclosa vankhedensis Dhande, Bodkhe & Ahmad, 2017 – India
- Cyclosa vicente Levi, 1999 – Colombia, Brazil, Argentina
- Cyclosa vieirae Levi, 1999 – Peru, Brazil
- Cyclosa walckenaeri (O. Pickard-Cambridge, 1889) – United States, Guyana, Caribbean
- Cyclosa woyangchuan F. Zhang, M. S. Zhang & Zhu, 2010 – China
- Cyclosa xanthomelas Simon, 1900 – Hawaii
- Cyclosa xingqing Mi, Wang & Li, 2024 – China
- Cyclosa yaginumai Biswas & Raychaudhuri, 1998 – Bangladesh
- Cyclosa zhangmuensis Hu & Li, 1987 – China
- Cyclosa zhui Zhou & Zhang, 2017 – China

== Cyphalonotus ==
Cyphalonotus Simon, 1895

- Cyphalonotus assuliformis Simon, 1909 — Vietnam
- Cyphalonotus benoiti Archer, 1965 — Congo
- Cyphalonotus columnifer Simon, 1903 — Madagascar
- Cyphalonotus elongatus Yin, Peng & Wang, 1994 — China
- Cyphalonotus larvatus (Simon, 1881) (type species) — Congo, East Africa, Socotra
- Cyphalonotus selangor Dzulhelmi, 2015 - Malaysia
- Cyphalonotus sumatranus Simon, 1899 — Sumatra

== Cyrtarachne ==
Cyrtarachne Thorell, 1868

- Cyrtarachne akirai Tanikawa, 2013 - China, Korea, Taiwan, Japan
- Cyrtarachne avimerdaria Tikader, 1963 — India
- Cyrtarachne bengalensis Tikader, 1961 — India, China
- Cyrtarachne bicolor Thorell, 1898 — Myanmar
- Cyrtarachne bigibbosa Simon, 1907 — Sao Tome, Bioko
- Cyrtarachne bilunulata Thorell, 1899 — Cameroon
- Cyrtarachne biswamoyi Tikader, 1961 — India
- Cyrtarachne bufo (Bösenberg & Strand, 1906) — China, Korea, Japan
- Cyrtarachne cingulata Thorell, 1895 — Myanmar
- Cyrtarachne conica O. P.-Cambridge, 1901 — Malaysia
- Cyrtarachne dimidiata Thorell, 1895 — Myanmar
- Cyrtarachne fangchengensis Yin & Zhao, 1994 — China
- Cyrtarachne finniganae Lessert, 1936 — Mozambique
- Cyrtarachne flavopicta Thorell, 1899 — Cameroon, Equatorial Guinea
- Cyrtarachne friederici Strand, 1911 — New Guinea
- Cyrtarachne gibbifera Simon, 1899 — Sumatra
- Cyrtarachne gilva Yin & Zhao, 1994 — China
- Cyrtarachne grubei (Keyserling, 1864) (type species) — Mauritius
- Cyrtarachne guttigera Simon, 1909 — Vietnam
- Cyrtarachne heminaria Simon, 1909 — Vietnam
- Cyrtarachne histrionica Thorell, 1898 — Myanmar
- Cyrtarachne hubeiensis Yin & Zhao, 1994 — China
- Cyrtarachne ignava Thorell, 1895 — Myanmar
- Cyrtarachne inaequalis Thorell, 1895 — India to Japan
- Cyrtarachne invenusta Thorell, 1891 — Nicobar Islands
- Cyrtarachne ixoides (Simon, 1870) — Mediterranean to Georgia, Madagascar
- Cyrtarachne jucunda Tanikawa, 2013 - Japan
- Cyrtarachne lactea Pocock, 1898 — East Africa
- Cyrtarachne laevis Thorell, 1877 — Sumatra, Flores, Sulawesi
- Cyrtarachne latifrons Hogg, 1900 — Victoria
  - Cyrtarachne latifrons atuberculata Hogg, 1900 — Victoria
- Cyrtarachne lepida Thorell, 1890 — Sumatra
- Cyrtarachne madagascariensis Emerit, 2000 — Madagascar
- Cyrtarachne melanoleuca Ono, 1995 — Thailand
- Cyrtarachne melanosticta Thorell, 1895 — Myanmar
- Cyrtarachne menghaiensis Yin, Peng & Wang, 1994 — China
- Cyrtarachne nagasakiensis Strand, 1918 — China, Korea, Japan
- Cyrtarachne nodosa Thorell, 1899 — Cameroon, Bioko, Yemen
- Cyrtarachne pallida O. P.-Cambridge, 1885 — Yarkand
- Cyrtarachne perspicillata (Doleschall, 1859) — Sri Lanka, Sumatra, Java, New Guinea
  - Cyrtarachne perspicillata possoica Merian, 1911 — Sulawesi
- Cyrtarachne promilai Tikader, 1963 — India
- Cyrtarachne raniceps Pocock, 1900 — India, Sri Lanka
- Cyrtarachne rubicunda L. Koch, 1871 — New South Wales
- Cyrtarachne schmidi Tikader, 1963 — India
- Cyrtarachne sinicola Strand, 1942 — China
- Cyrtarachne sundari Tikader, 1963 — India
- Cyrtarachne sunjoymongai Ahmed, Sumukha, Khalap, Mohan & Jadhav, 2015 - India
- Cyrtarachne szetschuanensis Schenkel, 1963 — China
- Cyrtarachne termitophila Lawrence, 1952 — Congo
- Cyrtarachne tricolor (Doleschall, 1859) — Moluccas to Australia
  - Cyrtarachne tricolor aruana Strand, 1911 — Aru Islands
- Cyrtarachne tuladepilachna Barrion & Litsinger, 1995 — Philippines
- Cyrtarachne xanthopyga Kulczynski, 1911 — New Guinea
- Cyrtarachne yunoharuensis Strand, 1918 — China, Korea, Japan

== Cyrtobill ==
Cyrtobill Framenau & Scharff, 2009

- Cyrtobill darwini Framenau & Scharff, 2009 — Australia

== Cyrtophora ==
Cyrtophora Simon, 1864

- Cyrtophora admiralia Strand, 1913 — Admiralty Islands
- Cyrtophora beccarii (Thorell, 1878) — Laos, Malaysia to Northern Territory
- Cyrtophora bicauda (Saito, 1933) — Taiwan
- Cyrtophora bidenta Tikader, 1970 — India
- Cyrtophora bimaculata Han, Zhang & Zhu, 2010 — China
- Cyrtophora caudata Bösenberg & Lenz, 1895 — East Africa
- Cyrtophora cephalotes Simon, 1877 — Philippines
- Cyrtophora cicatrosa (Stoliczka, 1869) — Pakistan to Northern Territory
- Cyrtophora citricola (Forsskal, 1775) (type species) — Old World, Greater Antilles, Costa Rica, Colombia
  - Cyrtophora citricola abessinensis Strand, 1906 — Ethiopia
  - Cyrtophora citricola lurida Karsch, 1879 — West Africa
  - Cyrtophora citricola minahassae Merian, 1911 — Sulawesi
- Cyrtophora cordiformis (L. Koch, 1871) — New Guinea, Queensland, Lord Howe Islands
- Cyrtophora crassipes (Rainbow, 1897) — New South Wales
- Cyrtophora cylindroides (Walckenaer, 1841) — China to Queensland
  - Cyrtophora cylindroides scalaris Strand, 1915 — New Britain
- Cyrtophora diazoma (Thorell, 1890) — Sumatra
- Cyrtophora doriae (Thorell, 1881) — New Guinea, Bismarck Archipel
- Cyrtophora eczematica (Thorell, 1892) — Malaysia, Java, Sulawesi, New Guinea
- Cyrtophora exanthematica (Doleschall, 1859) — Myanmar to Philippines, New South Wales
- Cyrtophora feai (Thorell, 1887) — India to Myanmar
- Cyrtophora forbesi (Thorell, 1890) — Sumatra
- Cyrtophora gazellae (Karsch, 1878) — New Britain
- Cyrtophora gemmosa Thorell, 1899 — Cameroon
- Cyrtophora guangxiensis Yin et al., 1990 — China
- Cyrtophora hainanensis Yin et al., 1990 — China
- Cyrtophora hirta L. Koch, 1872 — Queensland, New South Wales
- Cyrtophora ikomosanensis (Bösenberg & Strand, 1906) — Taiwan, Japan
- Cyrtophora jabalpurensis Gajbe & Gajbe, 1999 — India
- Cyrtophora koronadalensis Barrion & Litsinger, 1995 — Philippines
- Cyrtophora ksudra Sherriffs, 1928 — India
- Cyrtophora lacunaris Yin et al., 1990 — China
- Cyrtophora lahirii Biswas & Raychaudhuri, 2004 — Bangladesh
- Cyrtophora larinioides Simon, 1895 — Cameroon
- Cyrtophora limbata (Thorell, 1898) — Myanmar
- Cyrtophora lineata Kulczynski, 1910 — Solomon Islands, Bismarck Archipel
- Cyrtophora moluccensis (Doleschall, 1857) — India to Japan, Australia
  - Cyrtophora moluccensis albidinota Strand, 1911 — Caroline Islands, Palau, Yap
  - Cyrtophora moluccensis bukae Strand, 1911 — Solomon Islands
  - Cyrtophora moluccensis cupidinea (Thorell, 1875) — New Caledonia
  - Cyrtophora moluccensis margaritacea (Doleschall, 1859) — Java
  - Cyrtophora moluccensis rubicundinota Strand, 1911 — Keule Islands, near New Guinea
- Cyrtophora monulfi Chrysanthus, 1960 — New Guinea, Northern Territory
- Cyrtophora nareshi Biswas & Raychaudhuri, 2004 — Bangladesh
- Cyrtophora parangexanthematica Barrion & Litsinger, 1995 — Philippines
- Cyrtophora parnasia L. Koch, 1872 — Australia, Tasmania
- Cyrtophora petersi Karsch, 1878 — Mozambique
- Cyrtophora rainbowi (Roewer, 1955) — New South Wales
- Cyrtophora sextuberculata Tanikawa & Petcharad, 2015 - Thailand
- Cyrtophora subacalypha (Simon, 1882) — Aden
- Cyrtophora trigona (L. Koch, 1871) — Queensland, New Guinea
- Cyrtophora unicolor (Doleschall, 1857) — Sri Lanka to Japan, Philippines, New Guinea, Christmas Islands

== Deione ==
Deione Thorell, 1898

- Deione lingulata Han, Zhu & Levi, 2009 — China
- Deione ovata Mi, Peng & Yin, 2010 — China
- Deione renaria Mi, Peng & Yin, 2010 — China
- Deione thoracica Thorell, 1898 (type species) — Myanmar

== Deliochus ==
Deliochus Simon, 1894

- Deliochus pulcher Rainbow, 1916 — Queensland
  - Deliochus pulcher melanius Rainbow, 1916 — Queensland
- Deliochus zelivira (Keyserling, 1887) (type species) — Australia, Tasmania

== Demadiana ==
Demadiana Strand, 1929

- Demadiana carrai Framenau, Scharff & Harvey, 2010 — New South Wales
- Demadiana cerula (Simon, 1908) — Western Australia
- Demadiana complicata Framenau, Scharff & Harvey, 2010 — Queensland
- Demadiana diabolus Framenau, Scharff & Harvey, 2010 — South Australia, Tasmania
- Demadiana milledgei Framenau, Scharff & Harvey, 2010 — New South Wales, Victoria
- Demadiana simplex (Karsch, 1878) (type species) — Southern Australia

== Dolophones ==
Dolophones Walckenaer, 1837

- Dolophones bituberculata Lamb, 1911 — Queensland
- Dolophones clypeata (L. Koch, 1871) — Moluccas, Australia
- Dolophones conifera (Keyserling, 1886) — Australia
- Dolophones elfordi Dunn & Dunn, 1946 — Victoria
- Dolophones intricata Rainbow, 1915 — South Australia
- Dolophones macleayi (Bradley, 1876) — Queensland
- Dolophones mammeata (Keyserling, 1886) — Australia
- Dolophones maxima Hogg, 1900 — Victoria
- Dolophones nasalis (Butler, 1876) — Queensland
- Dolophones notacantha (Quoy & Gaimarg, 1824) (type species) — New South Wales
- Dolophones peltata (Keyserling, 1886) — Australia, Lord Howe Islands
- Dolophones pilosa (Keyserling, 1886) — Australia
- Dolophones simpla (Keyserling, 1886) — New South Wales
- Dolophones testudinea (L. Koch, 1871) — Australia, New Caledonia
- Dolophones thomisoides Rainbow, 1915 — South Australia
- Dolophones tuberculata (Keyserling, 1886) — New South Wales
- Dolophones turrigera (L. Koch, 1867) — Queensland, New South Wales

== Dubiepeira ==
Dubiepeira Levi, 1991

- Dubiepeira amablemaria Levi, 1991 — Peru
- Dubiepeira amacayacu Levi, 1991 — Colombia, Peru, Brazil
- Dubiepeira dubitata (Soares & Camargo, 1948) (type species) — Venezuela to Brazil
- Dubiepeira lamolina Levi, 1991 — Ecuador, Peru
- Dubiepeira neptunina (Mello-Leitao, 1948) — Colombia, Peru, Guyana, French Guiana

== Edricus ==
Edricus O. P.-Cambridge, 1890

- Edricus productus O. P.-Cambridge, 1896 — Mexico
- Edricus spiniger O. P.-Cambridge, 1890 (type species) — Panama to Ecuador

== Enacrosoma ==
Enacrosoma Mello-Leitao, 1932

- Enacrosoma anomalum (Taczanowski, 1873) (type species) — Colombia, Peru to Brazil, French Guiana
- Enacrosoma decemtuberculatum (O. P.-Cambridge, 1890) — Guatemala
- Enacrosoma frenca Levi, 1996 — Mexico to Panama
- Enacrosoma javium Levi, 1996 — Costa Rica, Panama
- Enacrosoma multilobatum (Simon, 1897) — Peru
- Enacrosoma quizarra Levi, 1996 — Costa Rica

== Encyosaccus ==
Encyosaccus Simon, 1895

- Encyosaccus sexmaculatus Simon, 1895 — Colombia, Ecuador, Peru, Brazil

== Epeiroides ==
Epeiroides Keyserling, 1885

- Epeiroides bahiensis (Keyserling, 1885) — Costa Rica to Brazil

== Eriophora ==
Eriophora Simon, 1864

- Eriophora biapicata (L. Koch, 1871) — Australia
- Eriophora conica (Yin, Wang & Zhang, 1987) — China
- Eriophora edax (Blackwall, 1863) — USA to Brazil
- Eriophora flavicoma (Simon, 1880) — New Caledonia, Loyalty Islands
- Eriophora fuliginea (C. L. Koch, 1838) — Honduras to Brazil
- Eriophora nephiloides (O. P.-Cambridge, 1889) — Guatemala to Guyana
- Eriophora neufvilleorum (Lessert, 1930) — Congo, Ethiopia
- Eriophora pustulosa (Walckenaer, 1841) — Australia, Tasmania, New Zealand
- Eriophora ravilla (C. L. Koch, 1844) (type species) — USA to Brazil
- Eriophora transmarina (Keyserling, 1865) — New Guinea, Australia, Samoa

== Eriovixia ==
Eriovixia Archer, 1951

- Eriovixia cavaleriei (Schenkel, 1963) — China
- Eriovixia enshiensis (Yin & Zhao, 1994) — China
- Eriovixia excelsa (Simon, 1889) — India, Pakistan, China, Taiwan, Philippines, Indonesia
- Eriovixia gryffindori Ahmed, Khalap & Sumukha, 2016 — India
- Eriovixia hainanensis (Yin et al., 1990) — China
- Eriovixia huwena Han & Zhu, 2010 — China
- Eriovixia jianfengensis Han & Zhu, 2010 — China
- Eriovixia laglaizei (Simon, 1877) — India, China to Philippines, New Guinea
- Eriovixia mahabaeus (Barrion & Litsinger, 1995) — Philippines
- Eriovixia menglunensis (Yin et al., 1990) — China
- Eriovixia napiformis (Thorell, 1899) — Cameroon to East Africa, Yemen
- Eriovixia nigrimaculata Han & Zhu, 2010 — China
- Eriovixia palawanensis (Barrion & Litsinger, 1995) — , Philippines
- Eriovixia patulisus (Barrion & Litsinger, 1995) — Philippines
- Eriovixia poonaensis (Tikader & Bal, 1981) — India, China
- Eriovixia pseudocentrodes (Bösenberg & Strand, 1906) — China, Laos, Japan
- Eriovixia rhinura (Pocock, 1899) (type species) — West, Central Africa
- Eriovixia sakiedaorum Tanikawa, 1999 — Hainan, Taiwan, Japan
- Eriovixia sticta Mi, Peng & Yin, 2010 — China
- Eriovixia turbinata (Thorell, 1899) — Cameroon, Congo
- Eriovixia yunnanensis (Yin et al., 1990) — China

== Eustacesia ==
Eustacesia Caporiacco, 1954

- Eustacesia albonotata Caporiacco, 1954 — French Guiana

== Eustala ==
Eustala Simon, 1895

- Eustala albicans Caporiacco, 1954 — French Guiana
- Eustala albiventer (Keyserling, 1884) — Brazil
- Eustala anastera (Walckenaer, 1841) (type species) — North, Central America
- Eustala andina Chamberlin, 1916 — Peru
- Eustala bacelarae Caporiacco, 1955 — Venezuela
- Eustala banksi Chickering, 1955 — Mexico, Costa Rica
- Eustala belissima Poeta, Marques & Buckup, 2010 — Brazil
- Eustala bifida F. O. P.-Cambridge, 1904 — USA to Panama
- Eustala bisetosa Bryant, 1945 — Hispaniola
- Eustala brevispina Gertsch & Davis, 1936 — USA, Mexico
- Eustala bucolica Chickering, 1955 — Panama
- Eustala californiensis (Keyserling, 1885) — USA, Mexico
- Eustala cameronensis Gertsch & Davis, 1936 — USA
- Eustala catarina Poeta, 2014 - Brazil
- Eustala cazieri Levi, 1977 — USA, Bahama Islands
- Eustala cepina (Walckenaer, 1841) — North America
- Eustala cidae Poeta, 2014 - Brazil
- Eustala clavispina (O. P.-Cambridge, 1889) — USA to El Salvador
- Eustala conchlea (McCook, 1888) — USA, Mexico
- Eustala conformans Chamberlin, 1925 — Panama
- Eustala crista Poeta, Marques & Buckup, 2010 — Brazil
- Eustala cuia Poeta, 2014 - Brazil
- Eustala delasmata Bryant, 1945 — Hispaniola
- Eustala delecta Chickering, 1955 — Panama
- Eustala devia (Gertsch & Mulaik, 1936) — USA to Panama, West Indies
- Eustala eldorado Poeta, 2014 - Brazil
- Eustala eleuthera Levi, 1977 — USA, Bahama Islands, Jamaica
- Eustala emertoni (Banks, 1904) — USA, Mexico
- Eustala ericae Poeta, 2014 - Brazil
- Eustala essequibensis (Hingston, 1932) — Guyana
- Eustala exigua Chickering, 1955 — Panama
- Eustala farroupilha Poeta, 2014 - Brazil
- Eustala fragilis (O. P.-Cambridge, 1889) — Guatemala, Panama
- Eustala fuscovittata (Keyserling, 1864) — Mexico, Cuba to South America
- Eustala gonygaster (C. L. Koch, 1838) — Brazil, Guyana
- Eustala guarani Poeta, 2014 - Brazil
- Eustala guianensis (Taczanowski, 1873) — Peru, French Guiana
- Eustala guttata F. O. P.-Cambridge, 1904 — Mexico to Brazil
- Eustala histrio Mello-Leitao, 1948 — Panama, Guyana
- Eustala illicita (O. P.-Cambridge, 1889) — Mexico to Brazil
- Eustala inconstans Chickering, 1955 — Panama
- Eustala ingenua Chickering, 1955 — Guatemala to Panama
- Eustala innoxia Chickering, 1955 — Panama
- Eustala itapocuensis Strand, 1916 — Brazil
- Eustala lata Chickering, 1955 — Panama
- Eustala latebricola (O. P.-Cambridge, 1889) — Guatemala to Panama
- Eustala levii Poeta, Marques & Buckup, 2010 — Brazil
- Eustala lisei Poeta, 2014 - Brazil, Uruguay
- Eustala lunulifera Mello-Leitao, 1939 — French Guiana, Guyana
- Eustala maxima Chickering, 1955 — Panama
- Eustala meridionalis Baert, 2014 - Galapagos Is.
- Eustala mimica Chickering, 1955 — Panama
- Eustala minuscula (Keyserling, 1892) — Brazil
- Eustala monticola Chamberlin, 1916 — Peru
- Eustala montivaga Chickering, 1955 — Panama
- Eustala mourei Mello-Leitao, 1947 — Brazil
- Eustala mucronatella (Roewer, 1942) — Brazil
- Eustala nasuta Mello-Leitao, 1939 — Panama, Guyana, Brazil
- Eustala nigerrima Mello-Leitao, 1940 — Brazil
- Eustala novemmamillata Mello-Leitao, 1941 — Argentina
- Eustala oblonga Chickering, 1955 — Panama
- Eustala occidentalis Baert, 2014 - Galapagos Is.
- Eustala orientalis Baert, 2014 - Galapagos Is.
- Eustala pallida Mello-Leitao, 1940 — Brazil
- Eustala palmares Poeta, Marques & Buckup, 2010 — Brazil, Uruguay
- Eustala perdita Bryant, 1945 — Hispaniola
- Eustala perfida Mello-Leitao, 1947 — Brazil
- Eustala photographica Mello-Leitao, 1944 — Brazil, Uruguay, Argentina
- Eustala redundans Chickering, 1955 — Panama
- Eustala rosae Chamberlin & Ivie, 1935 — USA, Mexico
- Eustala rubroguttulata (Keyserling, 1879) — Peru
- Eustala rustica Chickering, 1955 — Panama
- Eustala saga (Keyserling, 1893) — Brazil, Uruguay
- Eustala sagana (Keyserling, 1893) — Brazil
- Eustala scitula Chickering, 1955 — Mexico to Panama
- Eustala scutigera (O. P.-Cambridge, 1898) — Mexico to Panama
- Eustala secta Mello-Leitao, 1945 — Brazil, Argentina
- Eustala sedula Chickering, 1955 — Panama
- Eustala semifoliata (O. P.-Cambridge, 1899) — Central America
- Eustala smaragdinea (Taczanowski, 1878) — Peru
- Eustala tantula Chickering, 1955 — Panama
- Eustala taquara (Keyserling, 1892) — Brazil, Uruguay, Argentina
- Eustala tribrachiata Badcock, 1932 — Paraguay
- Eustala tridentata (C. L. Koch, 1838) — Brazil, French Guiana
- Eustala trinitatis (Hogg, 1918) — Trinidad
- Eustala tristis (Blackwall, 1862) — Brazil
- Eustala ulecebrosa (Keyserling, 1892) — Brazil, Argentina
- Eustala uncicurva Franganillo, 1936 — Cuba
- Eustala unimaculata Franganillo, 1930 — Cuba
- Eustala vegeta (Keyserling, 1865) — Mexico to Brazil, Hispaniola
- Eustala vellardi Mello-Leitao, 1924 — Brazil
- Eustala viridipedata (Roewer, 1942) — Peru
- Eustala wiedenmeyeri Schenkel, 1953 — Venezuela

== Exechocentrus ==
Exechocentrus Simon, 1889

- Exechocentrus lancearius Simon, 1889 (type species) — Madagascar
- Exechocentrus madilina Scharff & Hormiga, 2012 — Madagascar

== Faradja ==
Faradja Grasshoff, 1970

- Faradja faradjensis (Lessert, 1930) — Congo

== Friula ==
Friula O. P.-Cambridge, 1896

- Friula wallacei O. P.-Cambridge, 1896 — Borneo
