= List of Araneidae species =

These pages list all described species of the spider family Araneidae as of Nov. 5, 2013.

- List of Araneidae species: A
- List of Araneidae species: B–F
- List of Araneidae species: G–M
- List of Araneidae species: N–Z
