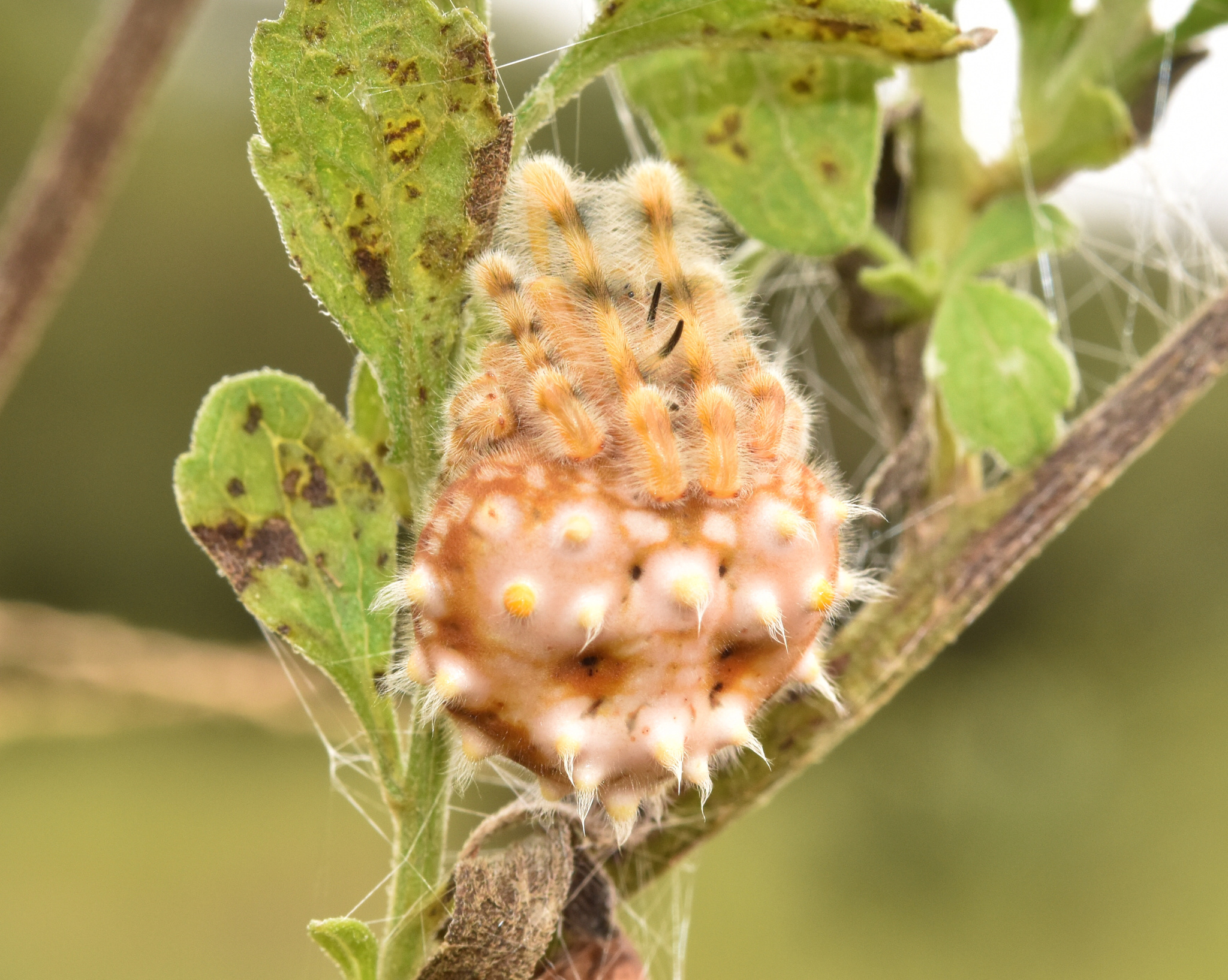
- female

Scientific classification
- Kingdom: Animalia
- Phylum: Arthropoda
- Subphylum: Chelicerata
- Class: Arachnida
- Order: Araneae
- Infraorder: Araneomorphae
- Family: Araneidae
- Genus: Cladomelea
- Species: C. akermani

Binomial name
- Cladomelea akermani Hewitt, 1923

= Cladomelea akermani =

Akerman's Bolas Spider

Species of spider

Cladomelea akermani is a species of spider in the orb-weaver spider family Araneidae, found in South Africa. Cladomelea species, including C. akermani, are "bolas spiders" – adult females capture their prey by using a sticky drop on the end of a single line which they swing, usually catching male moths attracted by the release of an analogue of the attractant sex pheromone produced by the female moth. Juvenile and adult male bolas spiders do not use a bolas, catching prey with their legs alone.

== Distribution ==
Cladomelea akermani is endemic to KwaZulu-Natal, South Africa. The species is known from a few localities at elevations ranging from 652 to 1,245 m above sea level.

== Description ==
A male and female were described by Levi in 2003. The female had a total length of 15.5 mm, the carapace being 5.4 mm long with a maximum width of 5.2 mm. The carapace was light orange-brown, with three projections with black ends. The sternum was light orange-brown. The abdomen was whitish, with a pair of brown tubercules on the upper surface and a central white rectangle on the lower surface. The first leg was longest, the patella and tibia totalling 10.8 mm.

The male was much smaller, with a total body length of 1.6 mm, about a tenth of that of the female. Its carapace and the underside of the abdomen were dark brown. The carapace was rough but lacked the projections of the female. The upper surface of the abdomen was spotted with black, grey and white, and had three humps and two hardened discs. The male's palpal bulb had a distinct conductor supporting the embolus.

== Habitat and ecology ==
The spider constructs a reduced orb web consisting of a bolas line used to catch moths at night. C. akermani is found in open grasslands, both in short grasses such as Themeda triandra which grows to about 40 cm, and very tall grasses such as giant turpentine grass, Cymbopogon validus, which grows over 2 m in height. Adult females are found towards the end of summer in March and into autumn. The egg sacs are attached to grass stems. The species inhabits Grassland and Savanna biomes.

Contrary to an earlier statement by Conrad Akerman that C. akermani uses its third leg (a statement repeated by others, e.g. Yeargan), the female handles its bolas with the second leg, swinging it in a horizontal plane.

== Taxonomy ==
Cladomelea akermani was first described by John Hewitt in 1923, from a female collected by Conrad Akerman in 1915. C. akermani is similar to C. longipes. Cladomelea species are bolas spiders, and although the genus was not included in two relevant molecular phylogenetic studies in 2014 and 2020, would be expected to be part of the "mastophorines", placed in the subfamily Cyrtarachninae s.l.

The male was described in 1998 by Leroy, Jocqué and Leroy from Umgeni Valley Nature Reserve.

== Distribution and habitat ==
Cladomelea akermani is native to South Africa. It has been recorded from grasslands in KwaZulu-Natal, around Pietermaritzburg.

== Conservation ==
Cladomelea akermani is listed as Vulnerable by the South African National Biodiversity Institute. Although known from a restricted area, it is likely under-collected and more locations are suspected to occur. There is ongoing decline of its grassland habitat due to crop cultivation, forestry plantations and urban development. The species is protected in the Umgeni Valley Nature Reserve.
