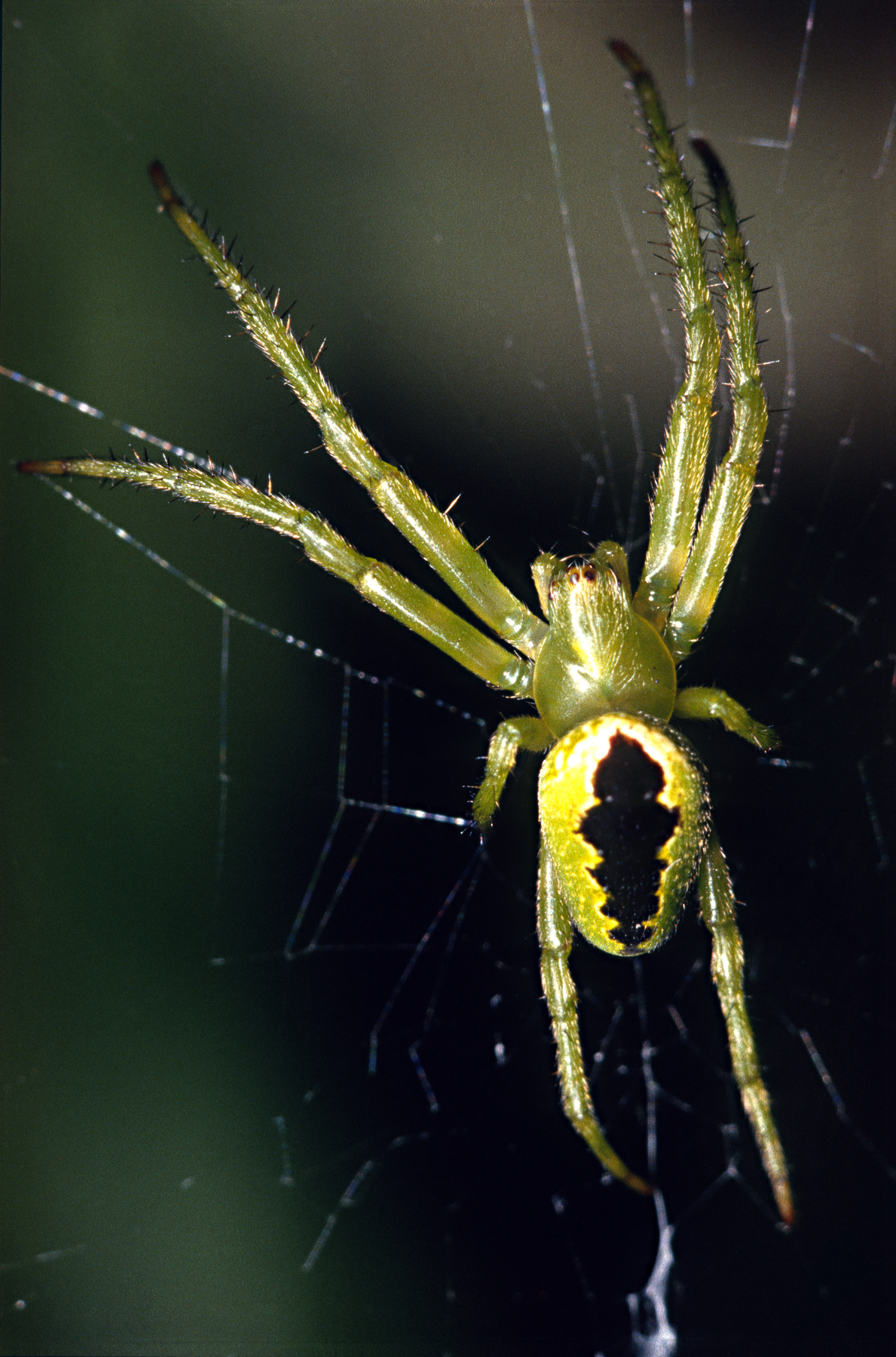

Conservation status
- Not Threatened (NZ TCS)

Scientific classification
- Kingdom: Animalia
- Phylum: Arthropoda
- Subphylum: Chelicerata
- Class: Arachnida
- Order: Araneae
- Infraorder: Araneomorphae
- Family: Araneidae
- Genus: Colaranea
- Species: C. melanoviridis

Binomial name
- Colaranea melanoviridis Court & Forster, 1988

= Colaranea melanoviridis =

Species of spider

Colaranea melanoviridis is a species of orb-weaver spider that is endemic to New Zealand.

== Taxonomy ==
Colaranea melanoviridis was described in 1988 by David J. Court and Raymond Robert Forster. The holotype is stored in Otago Museum.

== Description ==
Colaranea melanoviridis is a small, green orb-weaver with a notable black stripe down its abdomen. Excluding the legs, the female measures about 8.8mm in length whereas the male measures 6.1mm in length.

Colaranea melanoviridis most closely resembles Colaranea viriditas, but can be distinguished by the presence of the black band down its abdomen, more numerous leg spines in the first two pairs of legs of the female and by reduced number of spines on the prolateral surface of the first tibia in the male.

== Habitat and distribution ==
Colaranea melanoviridis appears to be restricted to forest habitats and are nocturnal. The species seems to be distributed throughout the North Island, but there are also records of it occurring on the South Island in Nelson.

== Conservation status ==
Under the New Zealand Threat Classification System, this species is listed as "Not Threatened".

== Gallery ==
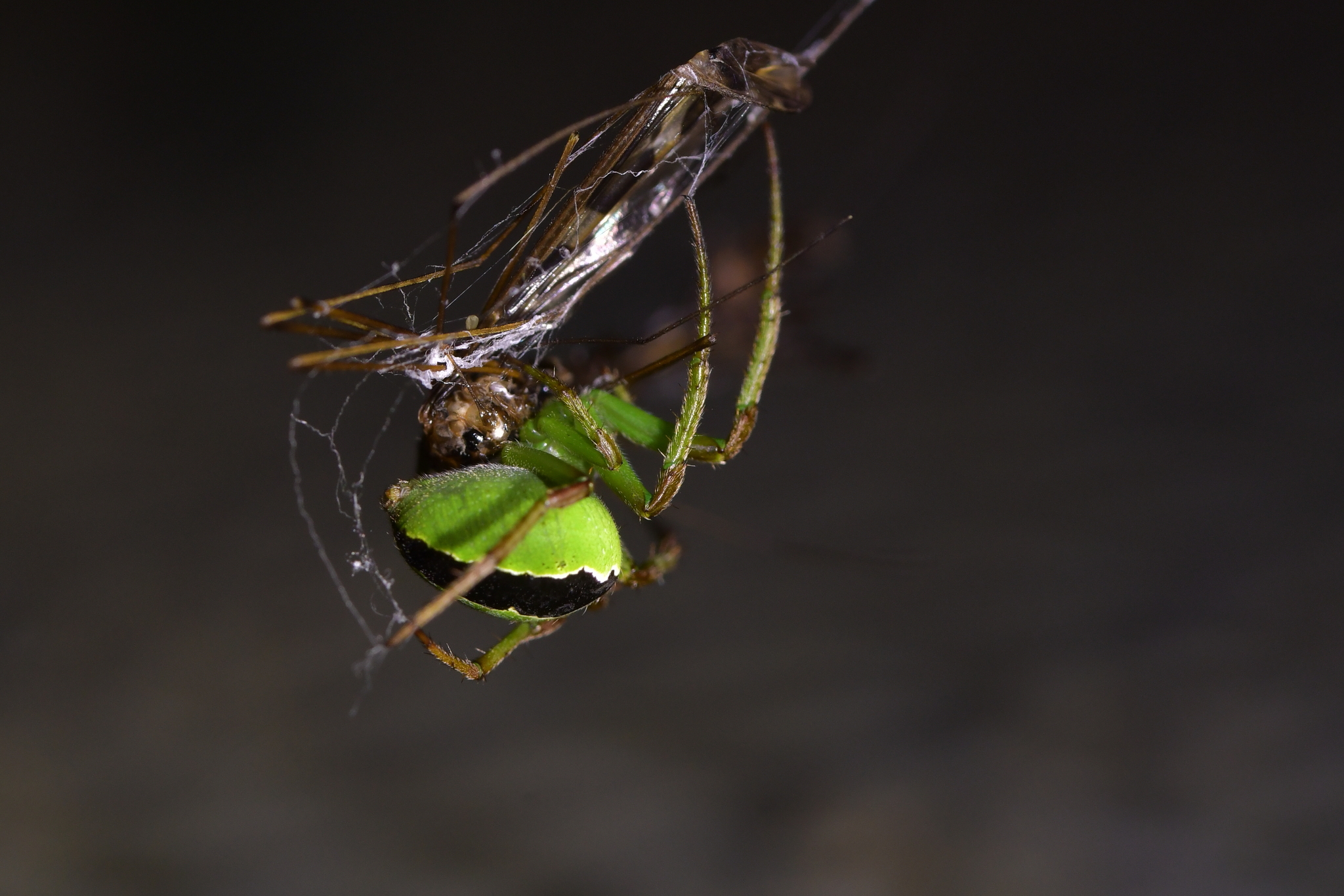

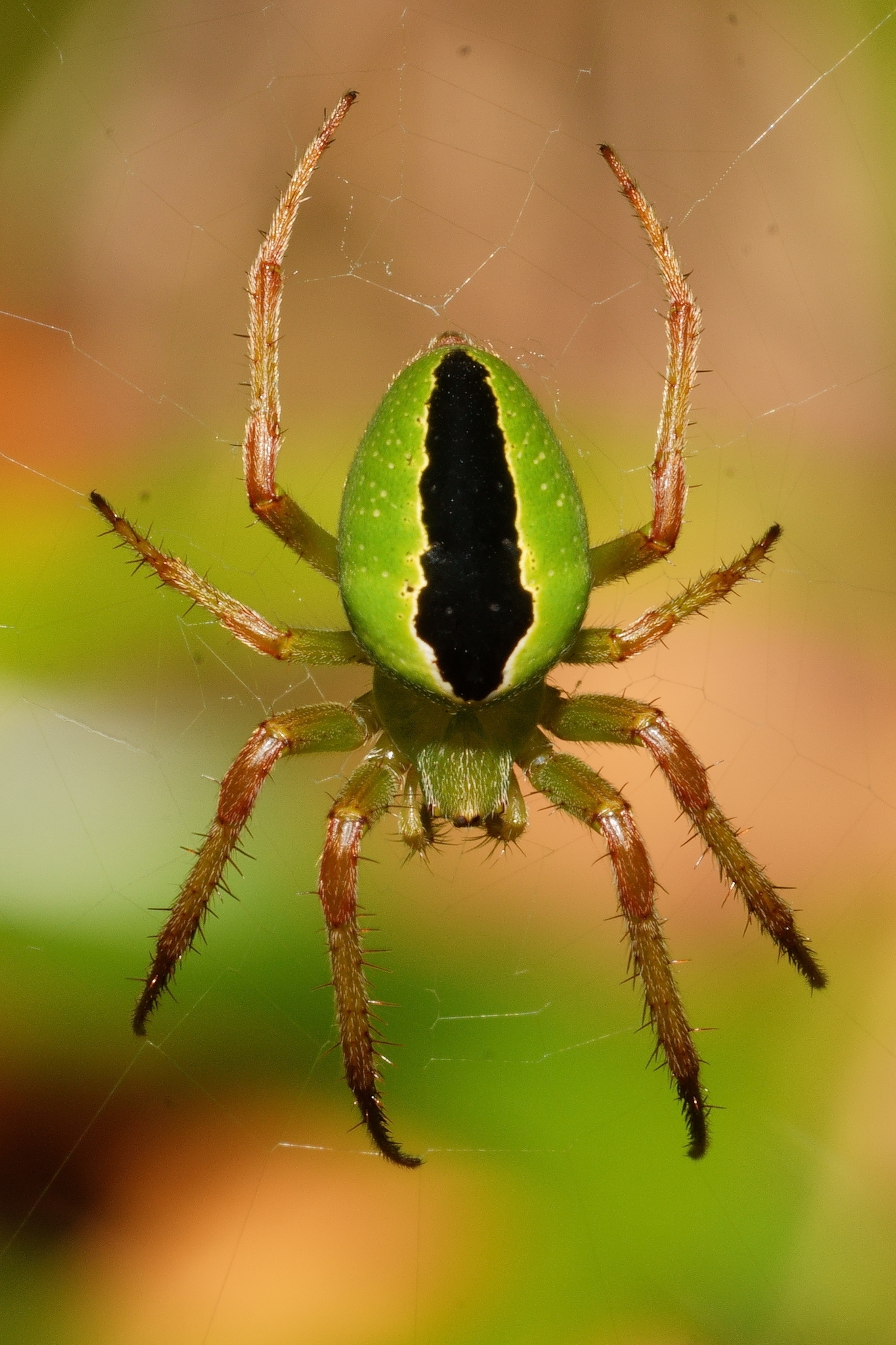

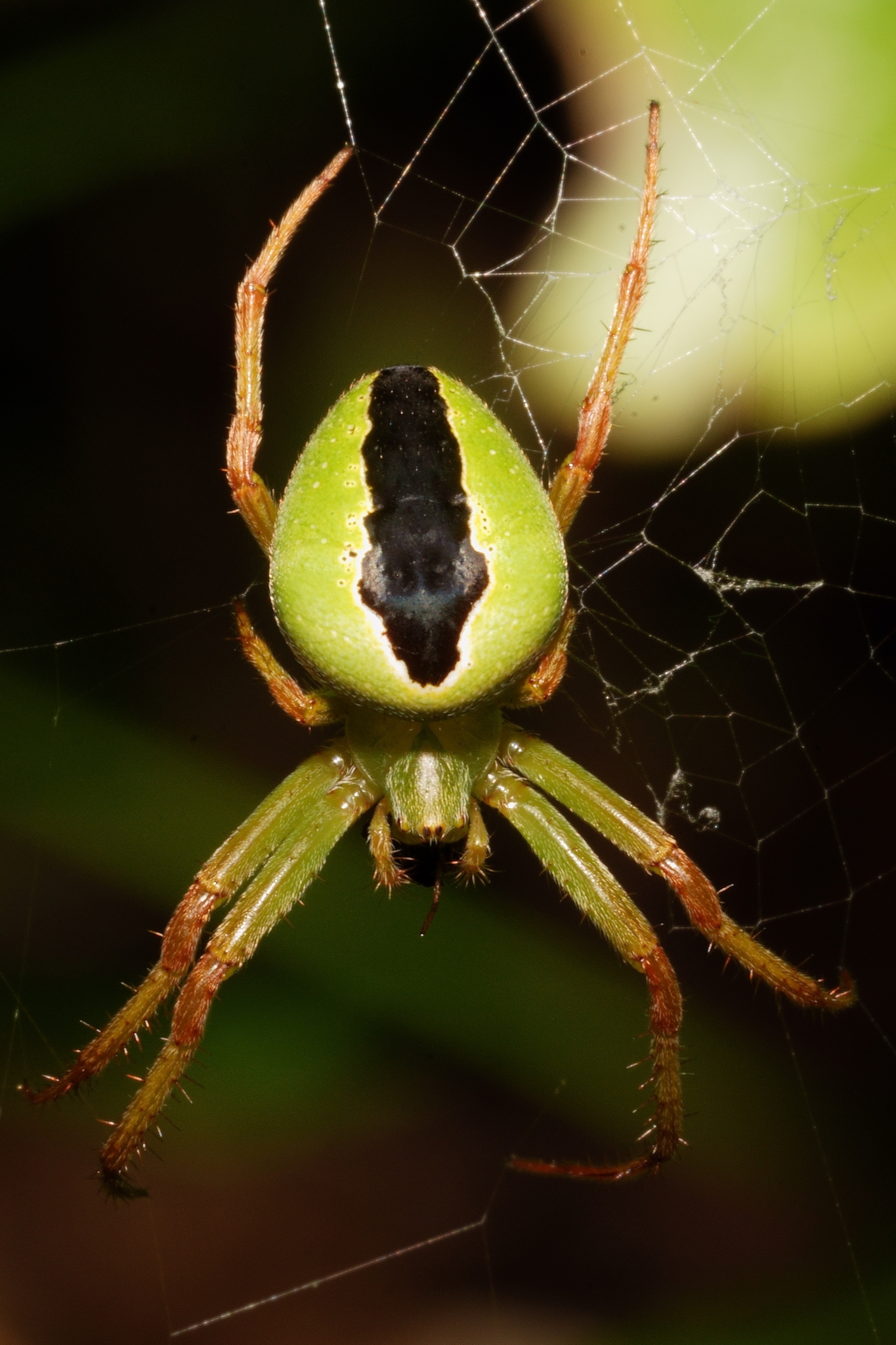

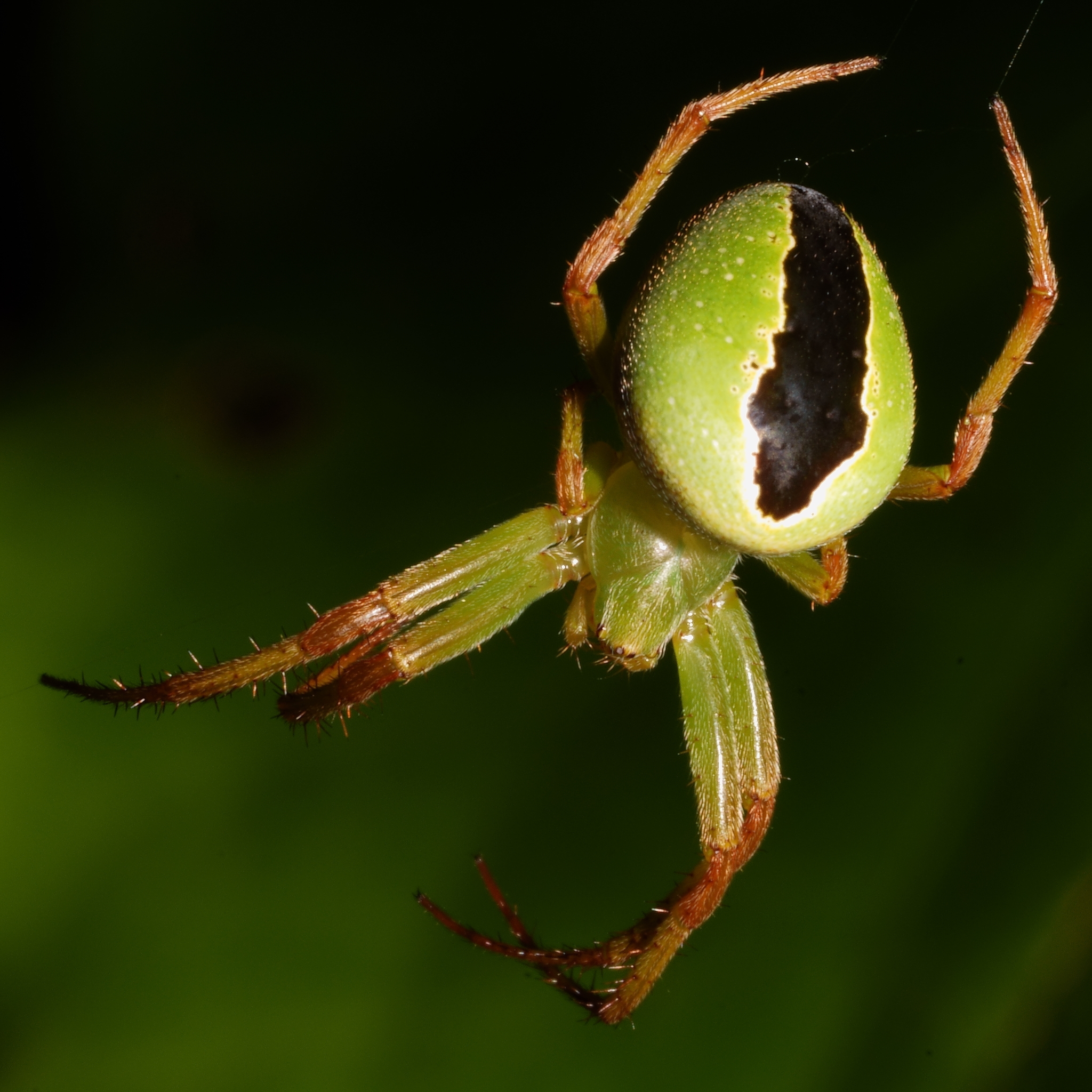
