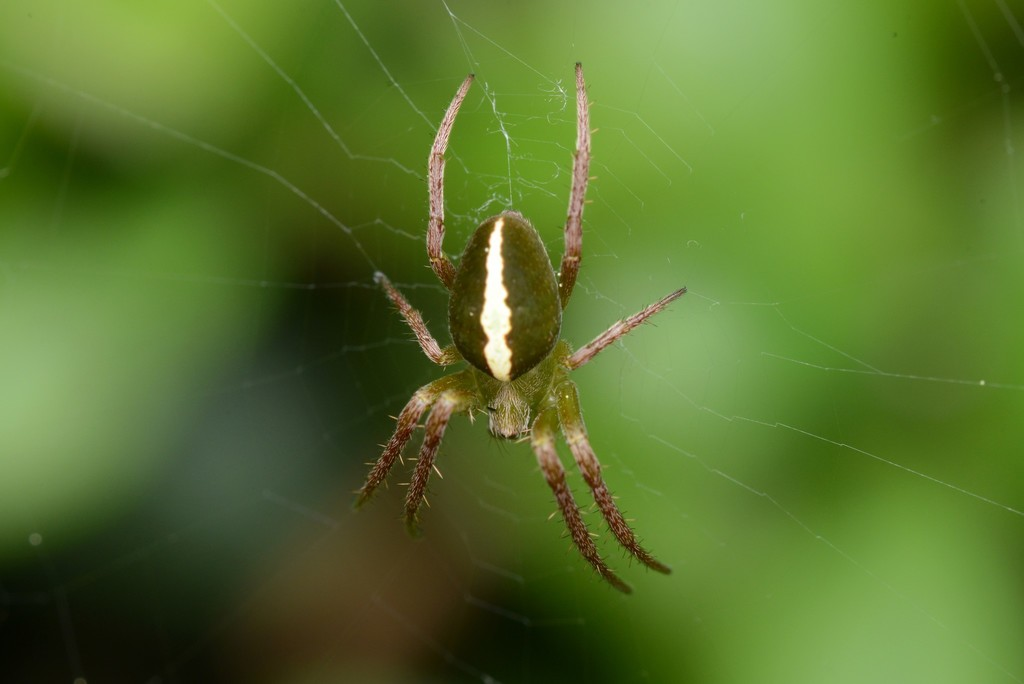

Conservation status
- Not Threatened (NZ TCS)

Scientific classification
- Kingdom: Animalia
- Phylum: Arthropoda
- Subphylum: Chelicerata
- Class: Arachnida
- Order: Araneae
- Infraorder: Araneomorphae
- Family: Araneidae
- Genus: Colaranea
- Species: C. brunnea

Binomial name
- Colaranea brunnea Court & Forster, 1988

= Colaranea brunnea =

Species of spider

Colaranea brunnea is a species of orb-weaver spider that is endemic to New Zealand.

== Taxonomy ==
Colaranea brunnea was described in 1988 by David J. Court and Raymond Robert Forster. The holotype is stored in Otago Museum.

== Description ==
Colaranea brunnea has a chocolate brown colouration, but has a notable white band going down the dorsal side of its abdomen. Excluding the legs, females are about 6.1mm in length whereas males are about 5.1mm in length. C. brunnea live in forest habitat.

== Distribution ==
This species is endemic to New Zealand.

== Conservation status ==
Under the New Zealand Threat Classification System, this species is listed as "Not Threatened".
