= Dolophones turrigera =

Turreted Wrap-around spider

Scientific classification
- Domain: Eukaryota
- Kingdom: Animalia
- Phylum: Arthropoda
- Subphylum: Chelicerata
- Class: Arachnida
- Order: Araneae
- Infraorder: Araneomorphae
- Family: Araneidae
- Genus: Dolophones
- Species: D. turrigera

Binomial name
- Dolophones turrigera (Koch, 1867)

Synonyms
- Gasteracantha turrigera Koch, 1867; Tholia conifera Keyserling, 1886

Species of spider

Dolophones turrigera is a species of spider indigenous to Australia. It was first described in 1867 by Ludwig von Koch. It is able to camouflage itself among plant material during the day and spins a web at night.
