= Cyrtobill =

Scientific classification
- Domain: Eukaryota
- Kingdom: Animalia
- Phylum: Arthropoda
- Subphylum: Chelicerata
- Class: Arachnida
- Order: Araneae
- Infraorder: Araneomorphae
- Family: Araneidae
- Genus: Cyrtobill
- Species: C. darwini

Binomial name
- Cyrtobill darwini Framenau & Scharff, 2009

Genus of spiders

Cyrtobill is a genus of Australian orb-weaver spiders containing the single species, Cyrtobill darwini. It was first described by V. W. Framenau & N. Scharff in 2009, and has only been found in Australia.
