= Colphepeira =

Scientific classification
- Kingdom: Animalia
- Phylum: Arthropoda
- Subphylum: Chelicerata
- Class: Arachnida
- Order: Araneae
- Infraorder: Araneomorphae
- Family: Araneidae
- Genus: Colphepeira
- Species: C. catawba

Binomial name
- Colphepeira catawba Archer, 1941

Genus of spiders

Colphepeira is a genus of North American orb-weaver spiders containing the single species, Colphepeira catawba. It was first described by Allan Frost Archer in 1941, and has only been found in United States and Mexico.
