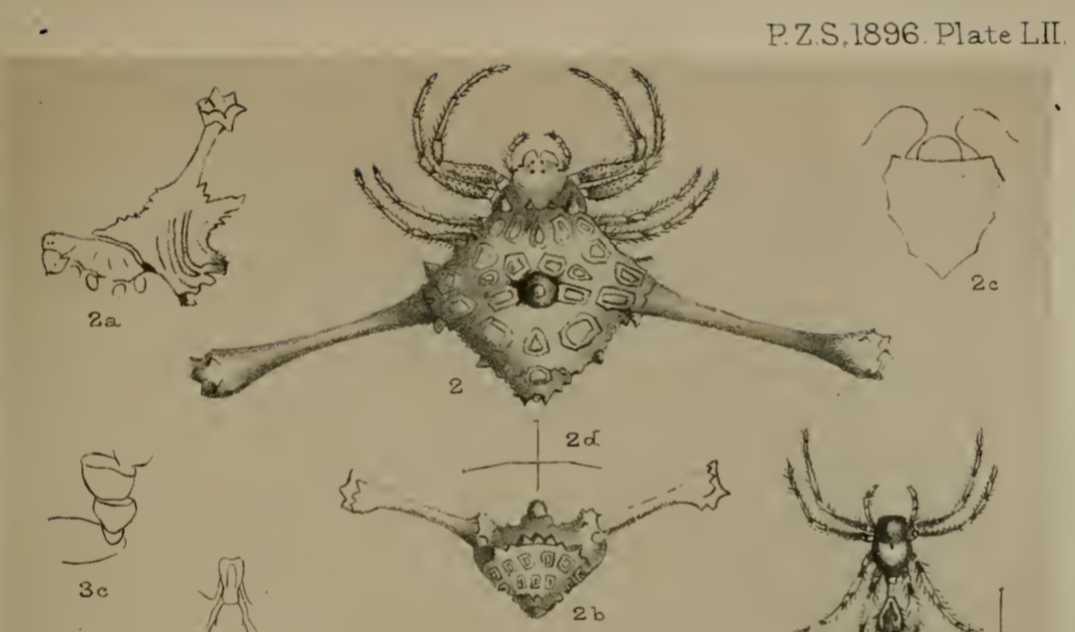

Scientific classification
- Domain: Eukaryota
- Kingdom: Animalia
- Phylum: Arthropoda
- Subphylum: Chelicerata
- Class: Arachnida
- Order: Araneae
- Infraorder: Araneomorphae
- Family: Araneidae
- Genus: Friula; O. Pickard-Cambridge, 1897
- Species: F. wallacei

Binomial name
- Friula wallacei O. Pickard-Cambridge, 1897

= Friula =

Genus of spiders

Friula is a genus of orb-weaver spiders containing the single species, Friula wallacei. It was first described by O. Pickard-Cambridge in 1897, and has been found only on Borneo. Pickard-Cambridge based his description and drawing on a specimen collected by Alfred Russel Wallace in Sarawak between November 1854 and January 1856. Pickard-Cambridge personally confirmed with Wallace that Wallace "was the captor of this spider, and in the locality mentioned." In 2017, the Alfred Russel Wallace Memorial Fund published a call for observations of this species, stating that no specimens of the species have been collected since Wallace's and that his specimen, housed at Oxford University, is the only known specimen in the world.

== Description ==
Pickard-Cambridge declared that the species is allied to the orb-weaver genus Gasteracantha. He described and illustrated two enormous, club-like spines, each longer than the width of the abdomen and crowned with "six or seven small conical prominences." He wrote, "Although an unmistakably gasteracanthid spider, it seems to me impossible to include this remarkable form in any genus as yet characterized."
