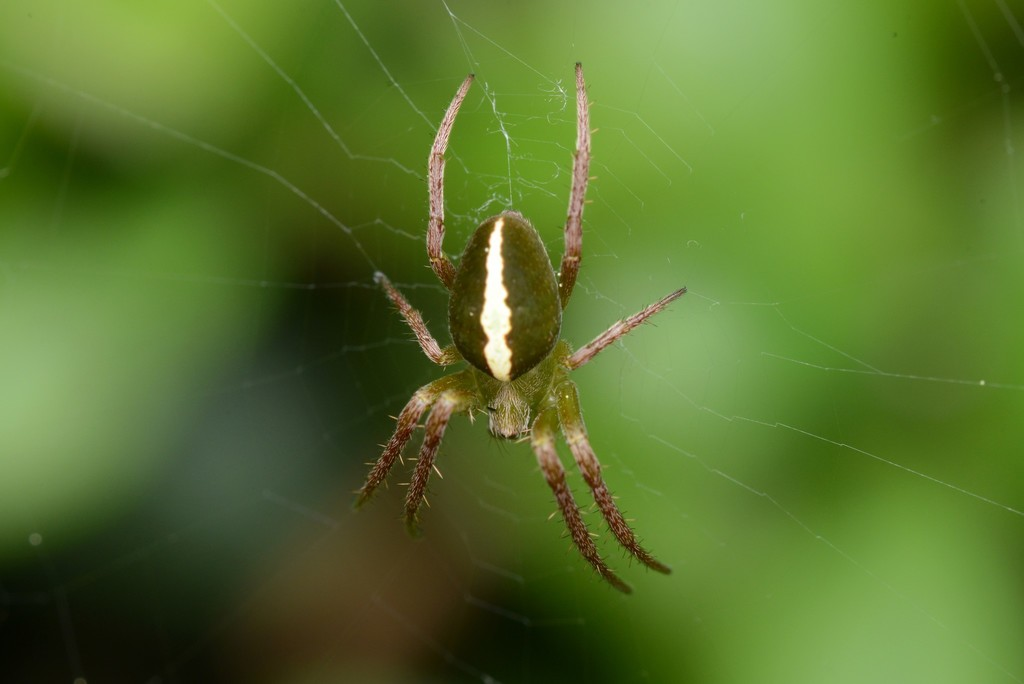

Scientific classification
- Kingdom: Animalia
- Phylum: Arthropoda
- Subphylum: Chelicerata
- Class: Arachnida
- Order: Araneae
- Infraorder: Araneomorphae
- Family: Araneidae
- Genus: Colaranea; Court & Forster, 1988

Type species
- C. viriditas (Urquhart, 1887)

Species
- 4, see text

= Colaranea =

Genus of spiders

Colaranea is a genus of orb-weaver spiders first described by D. J. Court & Raymond Robert Forster in 1988 that are endemic to New Zealand.

== Description ==
Colaranea have variable colouration, but are typically brown, red, yellow and especially green.

== Distribution ==
Colaranea are widespread throughout the North Island and South Island of New Zealand.

== Species ==
As of November 2026 it contains four species, all found in New Zealand:

- Colaranea brunnea Court & Forster, 1988 – New Zealand
- Colaranea melanoviridis Court & Forster, 1988 – New Zealand
- Colaranea verutum (Urquhart, 1887) – New Zealand
- Colaranea viriditas (Urquhart, 1887) – New Zealand
