= Exechocentrus lancearius =

Scientific classification
- Kingdom: Animalia
- Phylum: Arthropoda
- Subphylum: Chelicerata
- Class: Arachnida
- Order: Araneae
- Infraorder: Araneomorphae
- Family: Araneidae
- Genus: Exechocentrus
- Species: E. lancearius

Binomial name
- Exechocentrus lancearius Simon, 1889

Species of spider

Exechocentrus lancearius is a species of spider in the orb-weaver spider family Araneidae, found only in Madagascar. It was initially described from a partial specimen of an adult female. The first description of a complete specimen and its prey-catching behaviour was published in 2012. E. lancearius is a bolas spider. Rather than using a web, adult females catch their prey by using a line with one or two sticky drops (a "bolas") which they swing.

== Description ==
The neotype female was described by Scharff and Hormiga in 2012. The total length of the body is 3.9 mm. The cephalothorax is about 2.0 mm long and wide, and the abdomen 2.7 mm long and 3.9 mm wide. (The abdomen overlaps the cephalothorax.) The cephalothorax is pear-shaped and has four spine-like projections, one pointing forwards and three in a triangle behind it. The carapace is yellowish white with a white central stripe and dark brown markings. The sternum is blackish brown. The legs are yellowish white with orange brown markings. The first leg is the longest, being 12.4 mm from the femur to the tarsus. The abdomen is somewhat heart-shaped with two long projections at the rear. It is whitish on the upper surface with dark sigilla, and yellowish brown on the lower surface with a broad black band in the centre. The epigyne has a projecting hardened U-shaped lip. The male is unknown.

== Taxonomy ==
Exechocentrus lancearius was first described by Eugène Simon in 1889. It was the only species in his new genus Exechocentrus. Simon's description was based on a specimen lacking an abdomen; no complete adult specimen was known until one was collected in 2000. Since E. lancearius can be distinguished from E. madilina only by features of the abdomen, Simon's specimen cannot be assigned to either species with certainty, and in 2012, a new type specimen was designated.

A 2020 molecular phylogenetic analysis placed the genus in the informal group mastophorines of a broadly defined subfamily Cyrtarachninae s.l.

== Prey capture ==
Cartoon showing spider with bolas; redrawn from Fig. 5B, Scharff & Hormiga (2012)

The relationship of Exechocentrus lancearius (then the only species in the genus) to the bolas spiders placed in the tribe Mastophoreae had been noted by Emerit in 2000. Rather than a web, bolas spiders capture prey using a line with one or more sticky drops, which they swing at prey. However, the foraging behaviour of E. lancearius was not known until 2009 when a female using a bolas was observed shortly after sunset. It had produced a horizontal line of silk underneath a leaf about 1.5 m above the ground. It had also produced a bolas attached to the horizontal line by one end. The bolas was about 26 mm long, with one sticky droplet at the end furthest from the attachment and another about 4 mm above it. The bolas was manipulated with the second pair of legs and swung in a horizontal direction. No prey were seen to be caught during the period of observation.
