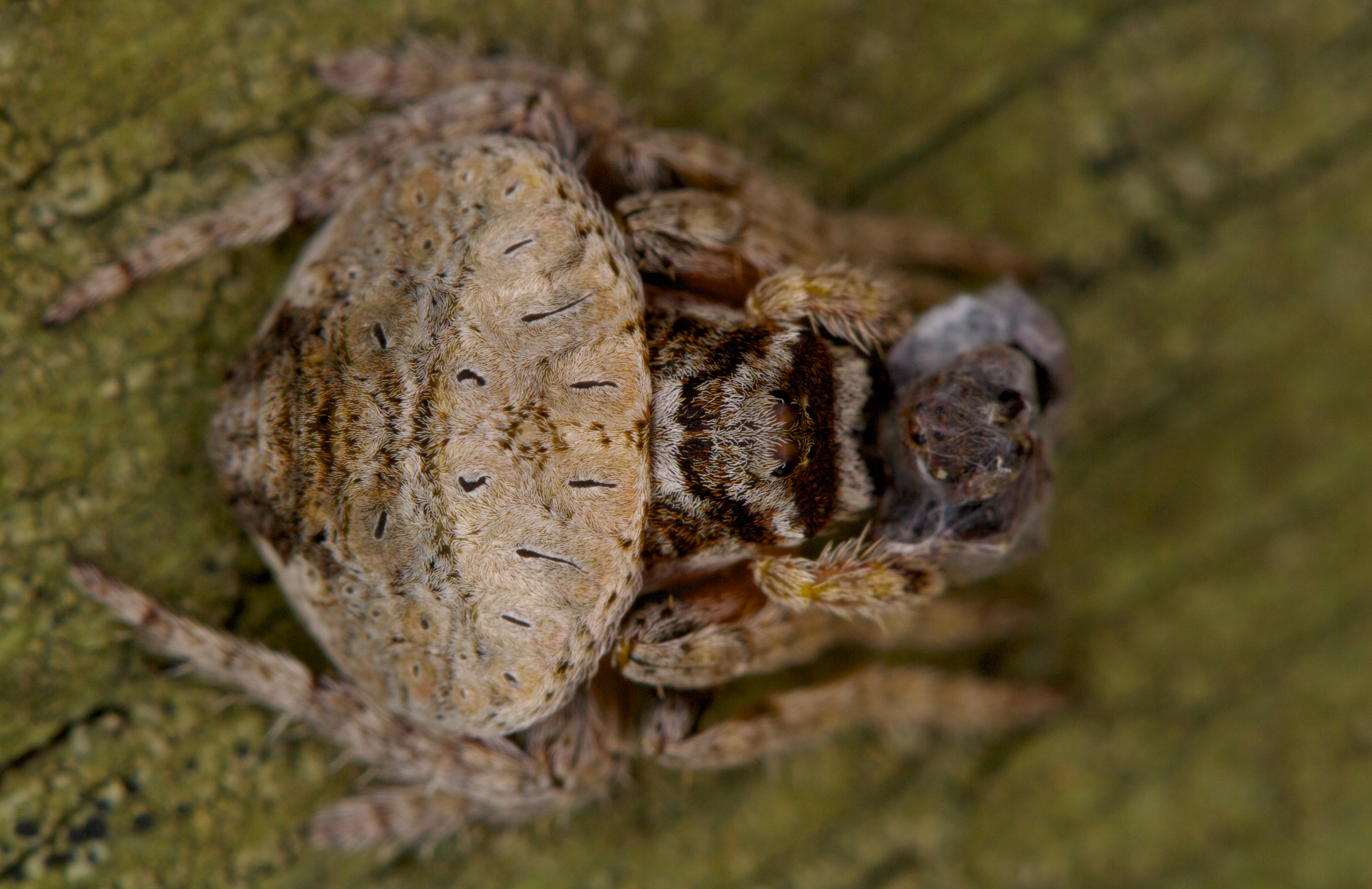

Scientific classification
- Kingdom: Animalia
- Phylum: Arthropoda
- Subphylum: Chelicerata
- Class: Arachnida
- Order: Araneae
- Infraorder: Araneomorphae
- Family: Araneidae
- Genus: Dolophones; Walckenaer, 1837

Type species
- D. notacantha (Quoy & Gaimarg, 1824)

Species
- 17, see text

= Dolophones =

Genus of spiders

Dolophones is a genus of orb-weaver spiders first described by Charles Athanase Walckenaer in 1837.

== Species ==
As of November 2026 it contains seventeen species:

- Dolophones bituberculata Lamb, 1911 – Australia (Queensland)
- Dolophones clypeata (L. Koch, 1871) – Indonesia (Moluccas), Australia
- Dolophones conifera (Keyserling, 1886) – Australia
- Dolophones elfordi Dunn & Dunn, 1946 – Australia (Victoria)
- Dolophones intricata Rainbow, 1915 – Australia (South Australia)
- Dolophones macleayi (Bradley, 1876) – Australia (Queensland)
- Dolophones mammeata (Keyserling, 1886) – Australia
- Dolophones maxima Hogg, 1900 – Australia (Victoria)
- Dolophones nasalis (Butler, 1876) – Australia (Queensland)
- Dolophones notacantha (Quoy & Gaimarg, 1824) – Australia (New South Wales)
- Dolophones peltata (Keyserling, 1886) – Australia (mainland, Lord Howe Is.)
- Dolophones pilosa (Keyserling, 1886) – Australia
- Dolophones simpla (Keyserling, 1886) – Australia (New South Wales)
- Dolophones testudinea (L. Koch, 1871) – Australia, New Caledonia
- Dolophones thomisoides Rainbow, 1915 – Australia (South Australia)
- Dolophones tuberculata (Keyserling, 1886) – Australia (New South Wales)
- Dolophones turrigera (L. Koch, 1867) – Australia (Queensland, New South Wales)
