= Exechocentrus =

Scientific classification
- Kingdom: Animalia
- Phylum: Arthropoda
- Subphylum: Chelicerata
- Class: Arachnida
- Order: Araneae
- Infraorder: Araneomorphae
- Family: Araneidae
- Subfamily: Cyrtarachninae s.l.
- Genus: Exechocentrus; Simon, 1889

Type species
- E. lancearius Simon, 1889

Species
- 2, See text.

Genus of spiders

Exechocentrus is a genus of Madagascan orb-weaver spiders (family Araneidae) first described by Eugène Simon in 1889. They are bolas-using spiders, capturing their prey with one or more sticky drops at the end of a single line of silk rather than in a web.

== Description ==
Males of the genus are unknown. Females can be distinguished from all other known members of the family Araneidae by the spine-like projections on the cephalothorax. One is centrally placed and extends forwards; three are more-or-less upright. The total body length is 3.9–5.4 mm (1/8–3/16 in). The cephalothorax is yellowish-white with brown lines radiating from the fovea and is about as wide as it is long. The legs are pale yellowish-white with dark brown markings. The abdomen is off white and almost heart-shaped from above. The epigyne has a strongly hardened (sclerotized) lip. The spermathecae are large and ovoid, with short narrow copulatory ducts.

== Prey capture ==
The probable relationship of the genus Exechocentrus to the bolas spiders placed in the tribe Mastophorini (Mastophoreae) had been noted by Emerit in 2000, who suggested that it might also capture prey with a bolas. However, foraging behaviour was not observed until 2009, when an adult female Exechocentrus lancearius was seen to use a bolas with two droplets. The bolas was manipulated with the spider's second pair of legs and swung in a horizontal direction. The relationship to other bolas spiders was confirmed by a molecular phylogenetic analysis in 2020.

== Taxonomy ==
The genus Exechocentrus was erected by Eugène Simon in 1889 for the species Exechocentrus lancearius, which was described based on a specimen lacking an abdomen. No complete adult specimen was known until a collection in 2000. E. lancearius remained the only species in the genus until 2009, when an adult female was collected that was discovered to belong to a different species of Exechocentrus, which was described as Exechocentrus madilina in 2012. The two species are distinguished by features of the abdomen, so Simon's original type specimen cannot be assigned with certainty to either of them.

A 2020 molecular phylogenetic analysis placed the genus in the informal group mastophorines of a broadly defined subfamily Cyrtarachninae s.l.

== Species ==
As of November 2026, this genus includes two species, both endemic to Madagascar:

- Exechocentrus lancearius Simon, 1889
- Exechocentrus madilina Scharff & Hormiga, 2012
