= Chorizopes mucronatus =

Scientific classification
- Kingdom: Animalia
- Phylum: Arthropoda
- Subphylum: Chelicerata
- Class: Arachnida
- Order: Araneae
- Infraorder: Araneomorphae
- Family: Araneidae
- Genus: Chorizopes
- Species: C. mucronatus

Binomial name
- Chorizopes mucronatus Simon, 1895

Species of spider

Chorizopes mucronatus is a species of spider of the genus Chorizopes. It is known only from Sri Lanka.
