= Encyosaccus =

Scientific classification
- Kingdom: Animalia
- Phylum: Arthropoda
- Subphylum: Chelicerata
- Class: Arachnida
- Order: Araneae
- Infraorder: Araneomorphae
- Family: Araneidae
- Genus: Encyosaccus
- Species: E. sexmaculatus

Binomial name
- Encyosaccus sexmaculatus Simon, 1895

Genus of spiders

Encyosaccus is a genus of South American orb-weaver spiders containing the single species, Encyosaccus sexmaculatus. It was first described by Eugène Simon in 1895, and has only been found in Colombia, Ecuador, Peru, and Brazil.

== Description ==
Encyosaccus sexmaculatus is dark orange, with a black tarsus (the last leg segment). The dorsal side of the abdomen is light orange spotted with black. A white border, a white line running on the anterior-posterior axis, and two lines running on the left-right axis, segment the orange area into six sections.
