= Epeiroides =

Scientific classification
- Domain: Eukaryota
- Kingdom: Animalia
- Phylum: Arthropoda
- Subphylum: Chelicerata
- Class: Arachnida
- Order: Araneae
- Infraorder: Araneomorphae
- Family: Araneidae
- Genus: Epeiroides
- Species: E. bahiensis

Binomial name
- Epeiroides bahiensis Keyserling, 1885

Genus of spiders

Epeiroides is a genus of orb-weaver spiders containing the single species, Epeiroides bahiensis. It was first described by Eugen von Keyserling in 1885, and has only been found in Costa Rica and Brazil.
