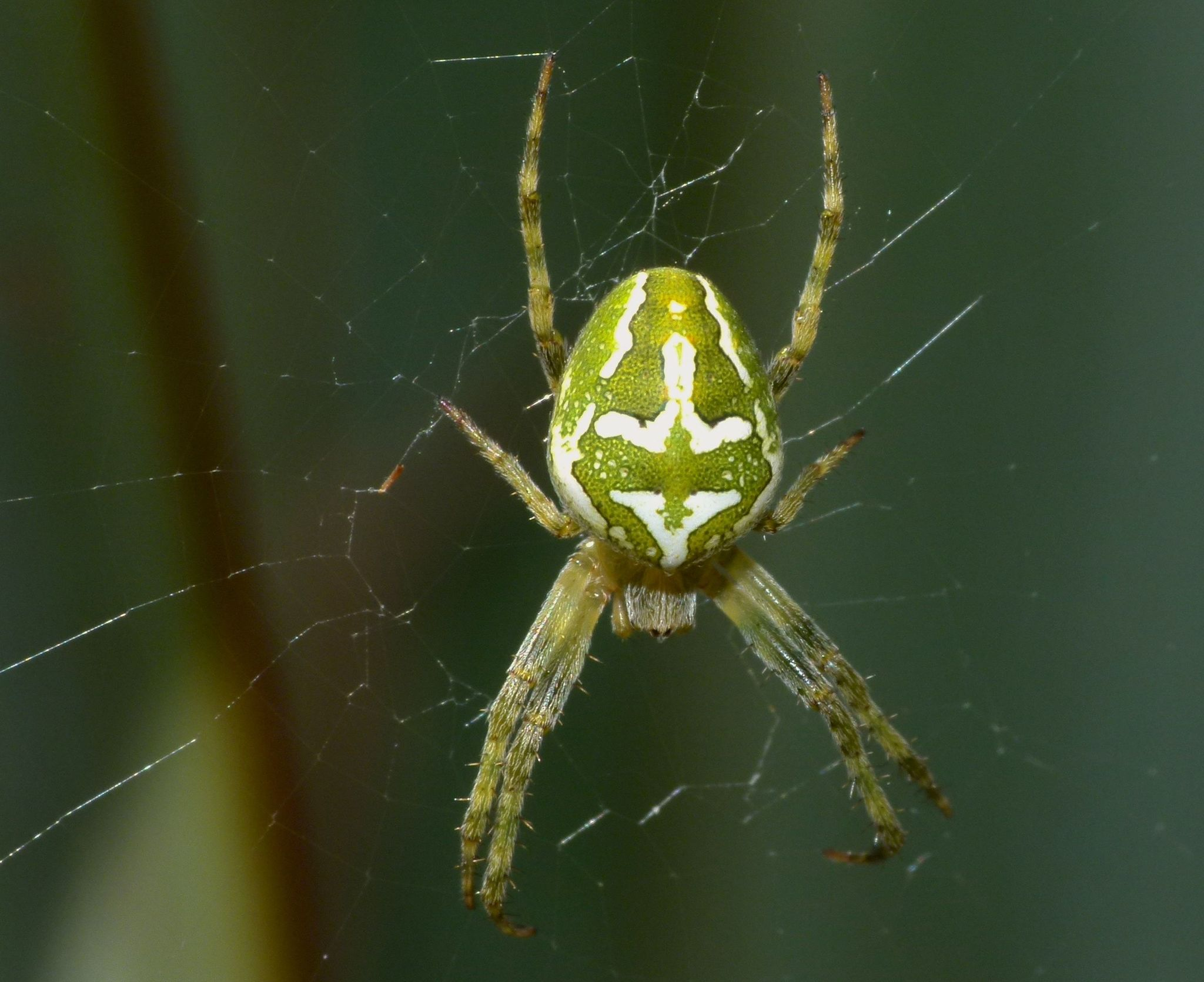

Conservation status
- Not Threatened (NZ TCS)

Scientific classification
- Domain: Eukaryota
- Kingdom: Animalia
- Phylum: Arthropoda
- Subphylum: Chelicerata
- Class: Arachnida
- Order: Araneae
- Infraorder: Araneomorphae
- Family: Araneidae
- Genus: Colaranea
- Species: C. verutum

Binomial name
- Colaranea verutum (Urquhart, 1887)

Synonyms
- Colaranea viriditas hastata Urquhart, 1887; Colaranea viriditas lineola Urquhart, 1887; Colaranea viriditas veruina Urquhart, 1887; Araneus verutus Bryant, 1935; Aranea viriditas hastata Roewer, 1942; Aranea viriditas lineola Roewer, 1942; Aranea viriditas veruina Roewer, 1942

= Colaranea verutum =

Species of spider

Colaranea verutum is a species of orb-weaver spider that is endemic to New Zealand.

== Taxonomy ==
Colaranea verutum was first described in 1887 by Arthur Urquhart as Epeira verutum, which had three subspecies, E.v. astatum, E.v. hastatum and E.v. lineola. It was most recently revised in 1988, in which it was transferred to Colaranea.

== Description ==
The female is recorded at 9.1mm in length whereas the male is 5.5mm. This species has variable colouration, but usually has a pale patch on the anterior lateral surface. The overall body colour varies from green and reddish brown/red colours.

== Distribution ==
This species is only formally known from Stewart Island and the South Island of New Zealand. However, there are iNaturalist records from the North Island.

== Conservation status ==
Under the New Zealand Threat Classification System, this species is listed as "Not Threatened".
