= Eustacesia =

Scientific classification
- Domain: Eukaryota
- Kingdom: Animalia
- Phylum: Arthropoda
- Subphylum: Chelicerata
- Class: Arachnida
- Order: Araneae
- Infraorder: Araneomorphae
- Family: Araneidae
- Genus: Eustacesia
- Species: E. albonotata

Binomial name
- Eustacesia albonotata Caporiacco, 1954

Genus of spiders

Eustacesia is a genus of South American orb-weaver spiders containing the single species, Eustacesia albonotata. It was first described by Lodovico di Caporiacco in 1954, and has only been found in French Guiana.
