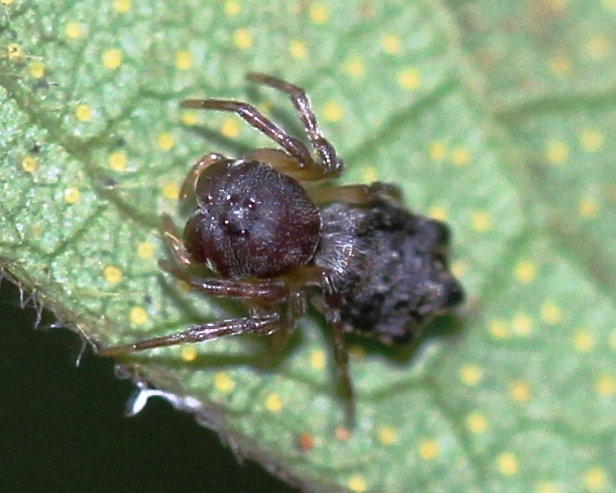

Scientific classification
- Kingdom: Animalia
- Phylum: Arthropoda
- Subphylum: Chelicerata
- Class: Arachnida
- Order: Araneae
- Infraorder: Araneomorphae
- Family: Araneidae
- Genus: Chorizopes
- Species: C. frontalis

Binomial name
- Chorizopes frontalis O. Pickard-Cambridge, 1870

= Chorizopes frontalis =

Species of orb-weaving spider

Chorizopes frontalis is a species of spider in the orb-weaver family Araneidae. This species can be found from Sri Lanka to Sumatra.

This species was described by Octavius Pickard-Cambridge, an English clergyman and arachnologist who is known for discovering over 900 species of spiders.
