= Collina glabicira =

Scientific classification
- Domain: Eukaryota
- Kingdom: Animalia
- Phylum: Arthropoda
- Subphylum: Chelicerata
- Class: Arachnida
- Order: Araneae
- Infraorder: Araneomorphae
- Family: Araneidae
- Genus: Collina; Urquhart, 1891
- Species: C. glabicira

Binomial name
- Collina glabicira Urquhart, 1891

Species of spiders

Collina glabicira is a species of Tasmanian orb-weaver spiders first described by A. T. Urquhart in 1891, and the only species in the genus Collina. It is known from a single female holotype that is not among the types at the Canterbury Museum, nor was a plate of the figure ever printed. The original description alone is not enough to identify it, so this species and its genus are considered nomina dubia.
