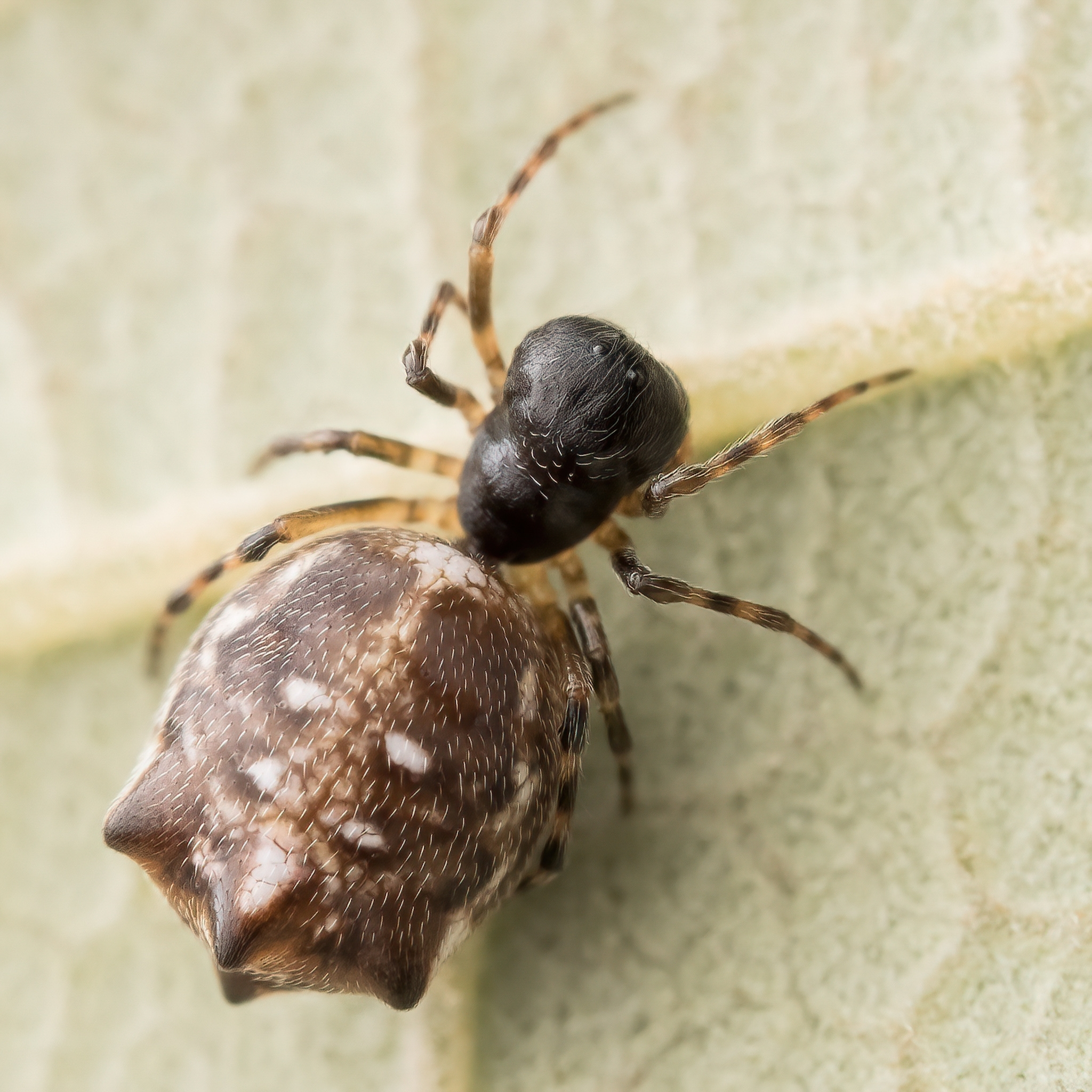

Scientific classification
- Kingdom: Animalia
- Phylum: Arthropoda
- Subphylum: Chelicerata
- Class: Arachnida
- Order: Araneae
- Infraorder: Araneomorphae
- Family: Araneidae
- Genus: Chorizopes; O. P-Cambridge, 1871

Type species
- Chorizoopes frontalis O. P-Cambridge, 1870

Species
- 27, see text

= Chorizopes =

Genus of spiders

Chorizopes is a genus of orb-weaver spiders that was erected by O. Pickard-Cambridge in 1871. Though it belongs to the orb weaver family, these spiders move through leaf litter preying on other spiders rather than spinning webs. The original name was "Chorizoopes", but the emendation Chorizopes by Tamerlan Thorell is now protected by usage.

== Species ==
As of November 2026 it contains twenty-seven species, most from India and China, with several others found in locations ranging from Madagascar to Japan:

- Chorizopes albus Mi, Wang & Peng, 2016 – China
- Chorizopes anjanes Tikader, 1965 – India
- Chorizopes antongilensis Emerit, 1997 – Madagascar
- Chorizopes calciope (Simon, 1895) – India
- Chorizopes casictones Kallal & Hormiga, 2019 – Madagascar
- Chorizopes congener O. Pickard-Cambridge, 1885 – India & Pakistan
- Chorizopes dicavus Yin, Wang, Xie & Peng, 1990 – China
- Chorizopes frontalis O. Pickard-Cambridge, 1871 – Sri Lanka, India, Myanmar
- Chorizopes goosus Yin, Wang, Xie & Peng, 1990 – China
- Chorizopes jianfengensis Gan, Wang, & Mi, 2020 – Hainan
- Chorizopes kastoni Gajbe & Gajbe, 2004 – India
- Chorizopes khandaricus Gajbe, 2005 – India
- Chorizopes khedaensis Reddy & Patel, 1993 – India
- Chorizopes liae Gan, Wang & Mi, 2020 – China
- Chorizopes longus Mi, Wang & Peng, 2016 – China
- Chorizopes madagascariensis Emerit, 1997 – Madagascar
- Chorizopes mucronatus Simon, 1895 – Sri Lanka
- Chorizopes nipponicus Yaginuma, 1963 – China, Korea, Japan
- Chorizopes pateli Reddy & Patel, 1993 – India
- Chorizopes rajanpurensis Mukhtar & Tahir, 2013 – Pakistan
- Chorizopes shimenensis Yin & Peng, 1994 – China
- Chorizopes stoliczkae O. Pickard-Cambridge, 1885 – India or Pakistan
- Chorizopes tikaderi Sadana & Kaur, 1974 – India
- Chorizopes trimamillatus Schenkel, 1963 – China
- Chorizopes tumens Yin, Wang, Xie & Peng, 1990 – China
- Chorizopes yinae Gan, Wang & Mi, 2020 – China
- Chorizopes yui Mi & Li, 2020 – China
- Chorizopes zepherus Zhu & Song, 1994 – China
