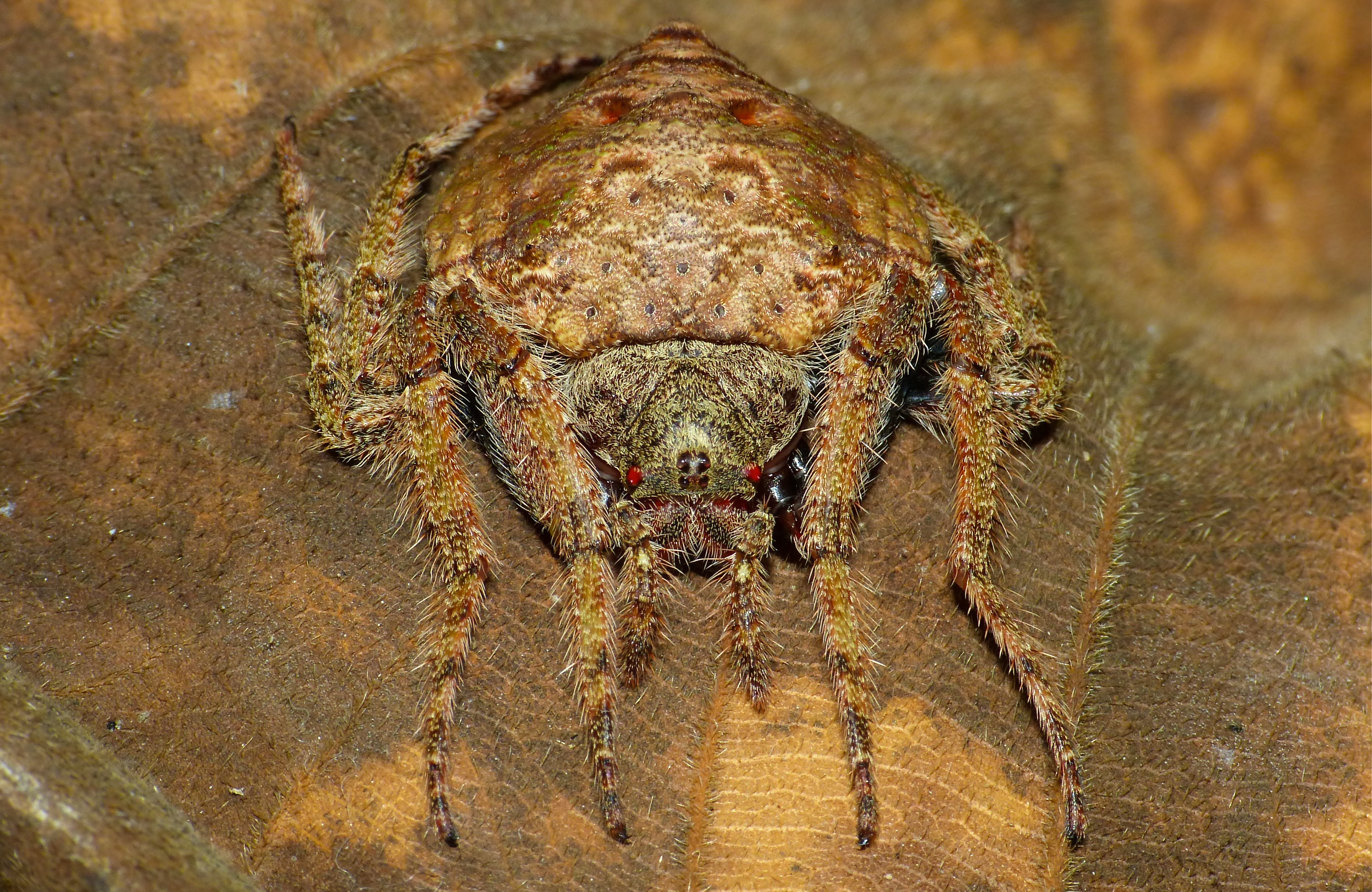

Scientific classification
- Kingdom: Animalia
- Phylum: Arthropoda
- Subphylum: Chelicerata
- Class: Arachnida
- Order: Araneae
- Infraorder: Araneomorphae
- Family: Araneidae
- Genus: Dolophones
- Species: D. conifera

Binomial name
- Dolophones conifera (Keyserling, 1886)

Synonyms
- Tholia conifera Keyserling, 1886

= Dolophones conifera =

Wrap-around spider

Species of spider

Dolophones conifera, known as the wrap-around spider, is a species of spider in the family Araneidae indigenous to Australia. It is named for its ability to flatten and wrap its body around tree limbs as camouflage. It is found in Western Australia along with several other species from the genus Dolophones, and was first described in 1886.

== Behaviour ==
During the evening, D. conifera stay in webs, and during the day take up their characteristic camouflaged form on tree branches and trunks. They also travel along the ground.
