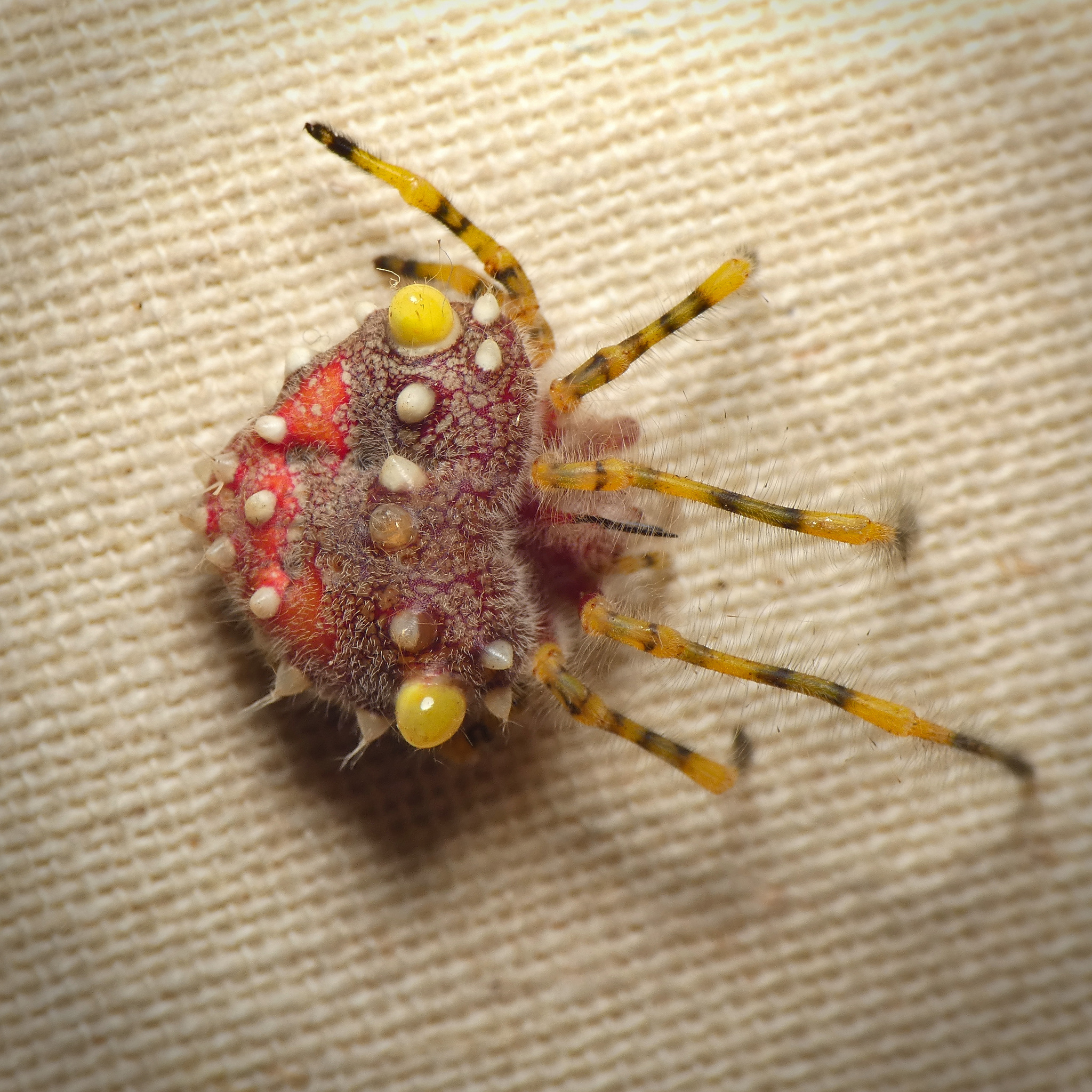

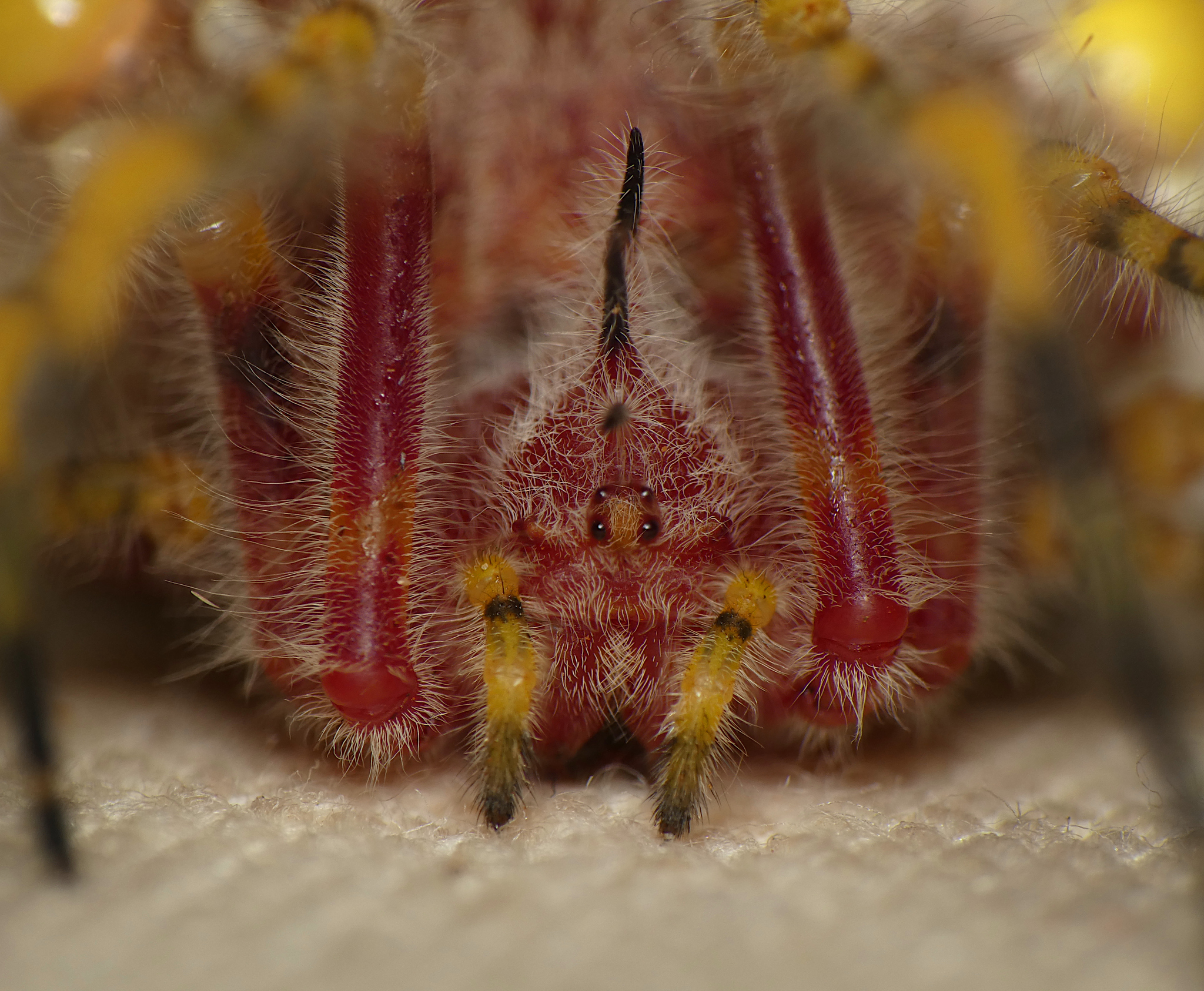

Scientific classification
- Kingdom: Animalia
- Phylum: Arthropoda
- Subphylum: Chelicerata
- Class: Arachnida
- Order: Araneae
- Infraorder: Araneomorphae
- Family: Araneidae
- Genus: Cladomelea
- Species: C. longipes

Binomial name
- Cladomelea longipes (O. Pickard-Cambridge, 1877)

= Cladomelea longipes =

Pink Bolas Spider

Species of spider

Cladomelea longipes is a species of spider in the family Araneidae. It is endemic to Africa and is commonly known as the pink bolas spider.

== Distribution ==
Cladomelea longipes is known from Cameroon, Democratic Republic of the Congo, Zimbabwe, and South Africa. The type locality was given as the banks of the river Coanza in Angola, possibly referring to the Quanza River. In South Africa, the species has been recorded from Limpopo Province.

== Habitat and ecology ==
The spider constructs a reduced orb web consisting of a bolas line used to catch moths at night. The egg cocoon constructed by C. longipes differs from that of other known Cladomelea species. Females construct four egg sacs that are suspended 0.5 to 1.9 m above the ground. The incubation period is about 40 days. The spiderlings emerge in groups of more than 100 and stay together for up to 36 hours after hatching. During breezier days they leave the hatching site quicker, with ballooning observed when some lift off with the breeze, attached to a length of silk.

An interesting observation was made when a small male was observed sitting on the epigyne of the female, with the white spot on the abdomen of the male clearly visible, indicating that he sits with his venter pressed against her epigyne. He stayed there for a few days, even while she was feeding.

== Description ==
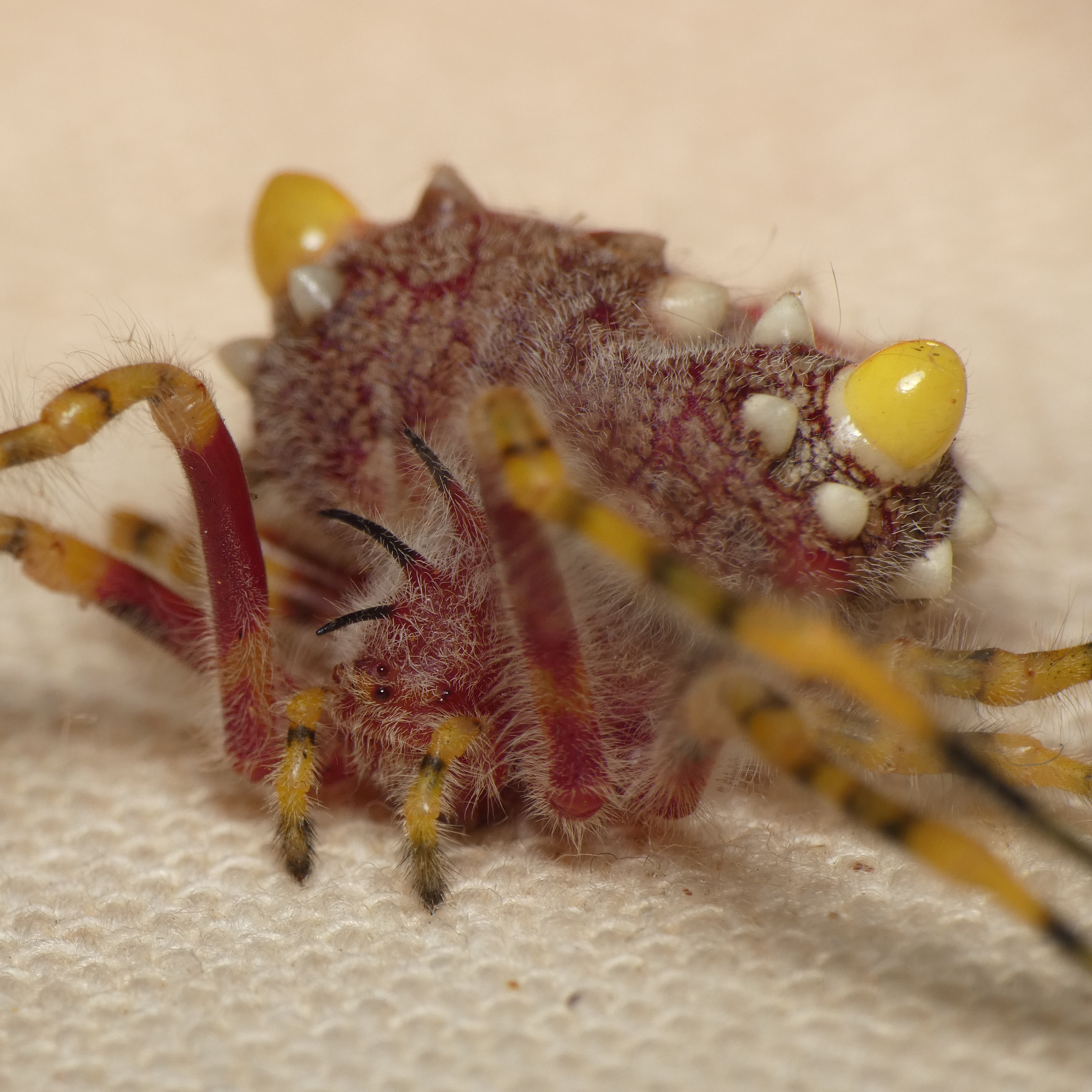

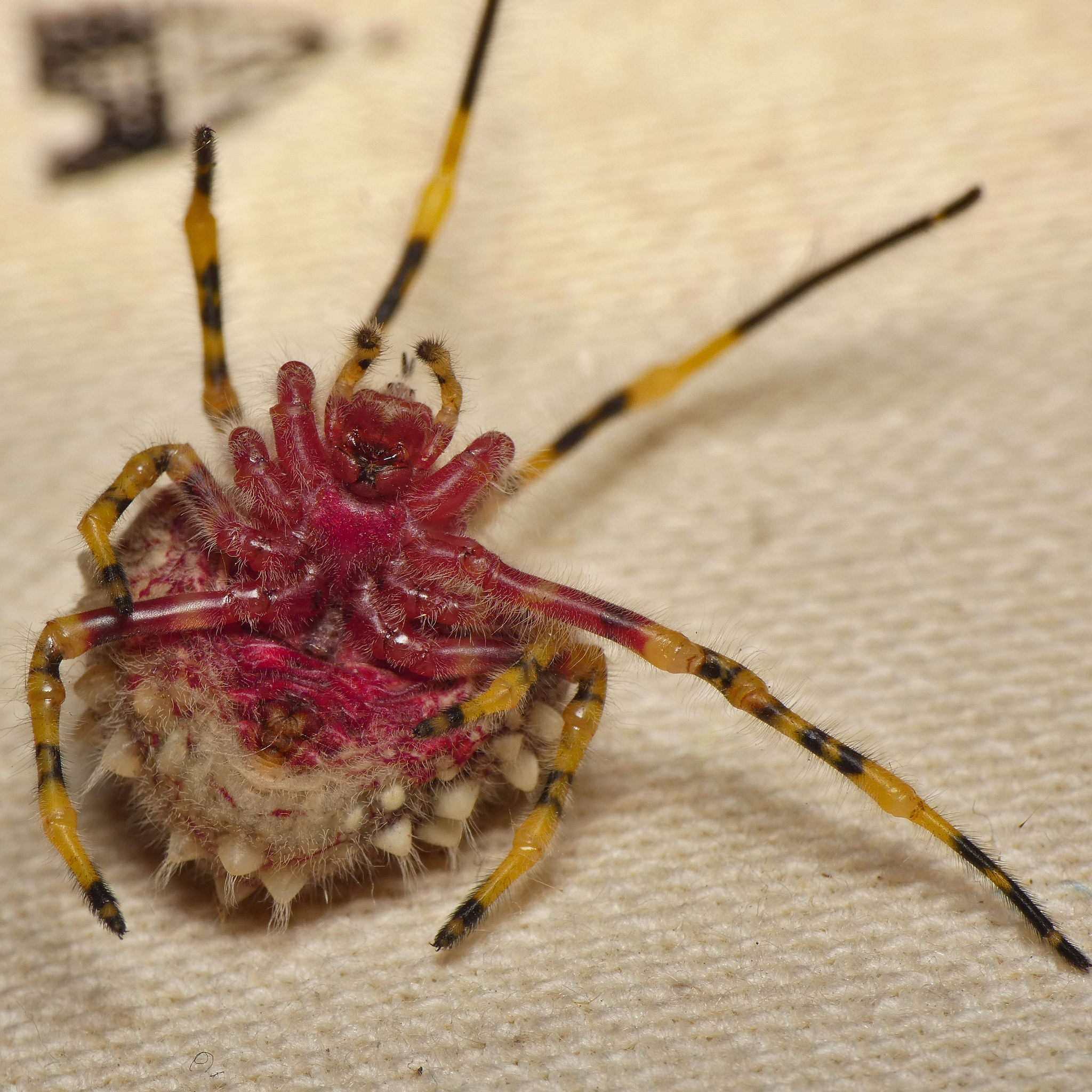

== Conservation ==
Cladomelea longipes is listed as Least Concern by the South African National Biodiversity Institute due to its wide distribution range in Africa.

== Taxonomy ==
The species was originally described by Octavius Pickard-Cambridge in 1877 from the banks of the river Coanza, West Africa. Only the female has been described.
