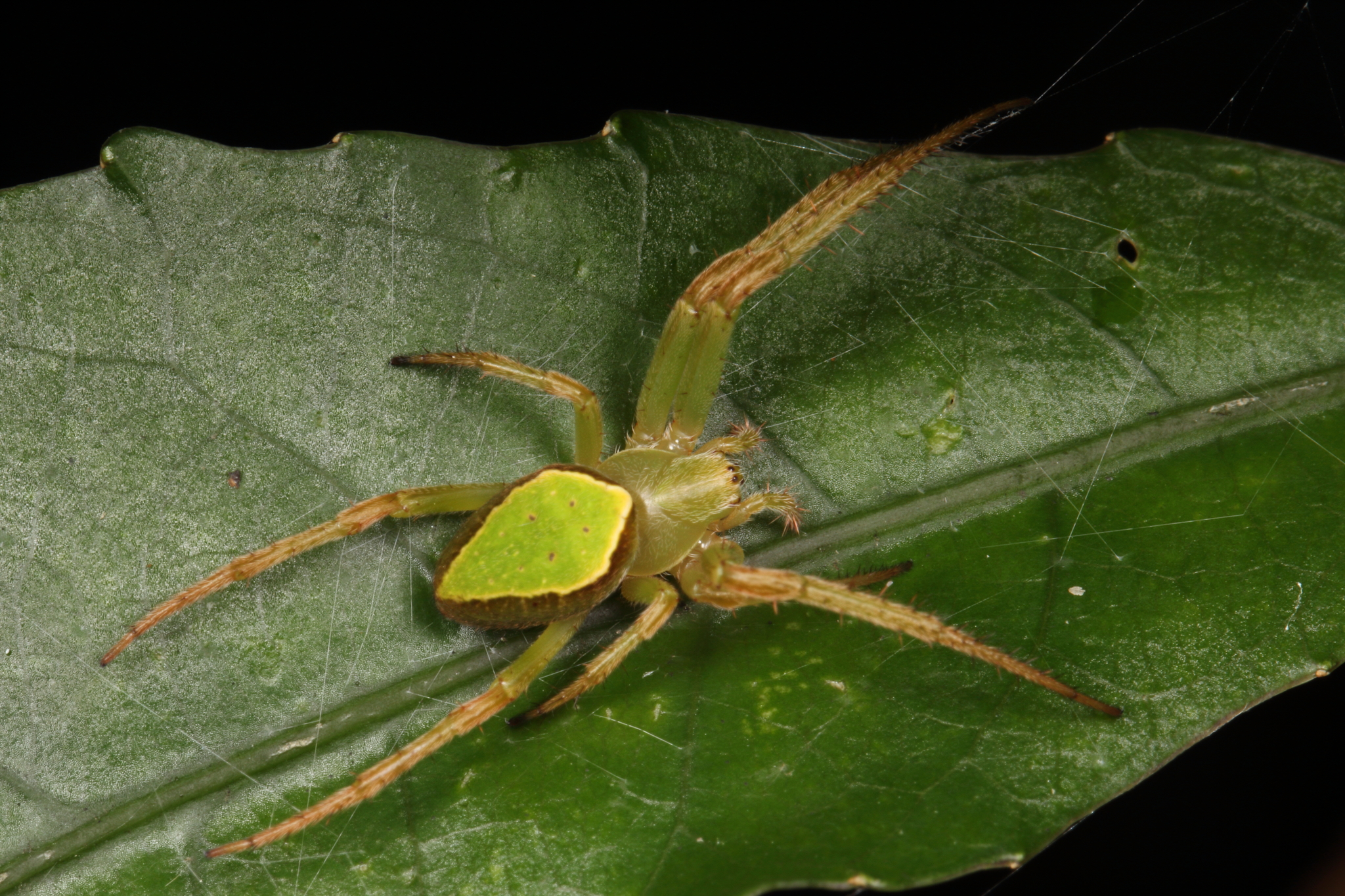

Conservation status
- Not Threatened (NZ TCS)

Scientific classification
- Domain: Eukaryota
- Kingdom: Animalia
- Phylum: Arthropoda
- Subphylum: Chelicerata
- Class: Arachnida
- Order: Araneae
- Infraorder: Araneomorphae
- Family: Araneidae
- Genus: Colaranea
- Species: C. viriditas

Binomial name
- Colaranea viriditas (Urquhart, 1887)

Synonyms
- Epeira viriditas; Epeira discolora; Epeira flavomaculata; Epeira galbana; Araneus viriditas; Aranea viriditas

= Colaranea viriditas =

Species of Arachnida

Colaranea viriditas is a species of orb-weaver spider that is endemic to New Zealand.

== Taxonomy ==
This species was described as Epeira viriditas in 1887 by Arthur Urquhart from a female specimen collected in Te Karaka. It was most recently revised in 1988, in which it was moved to the Colaranea genus. The holotype is stored in Canterbury Museum.

== Description ==
The female is recorded at 5.7mm in length whereas the male is 5.2mm. This species has a dark to yellowish brown carapace and legs. The majority of the abdomen is bright green dorsally. The rest of the abdomen is brown.

== Distribution ==
This species is endemic and widespread throughout New Zealand, including the Chatham Islands.

== Conservation status ==
Under the New Zealand Threat Classification System, this species is listed as "Not Threatened".

== Gallery ==
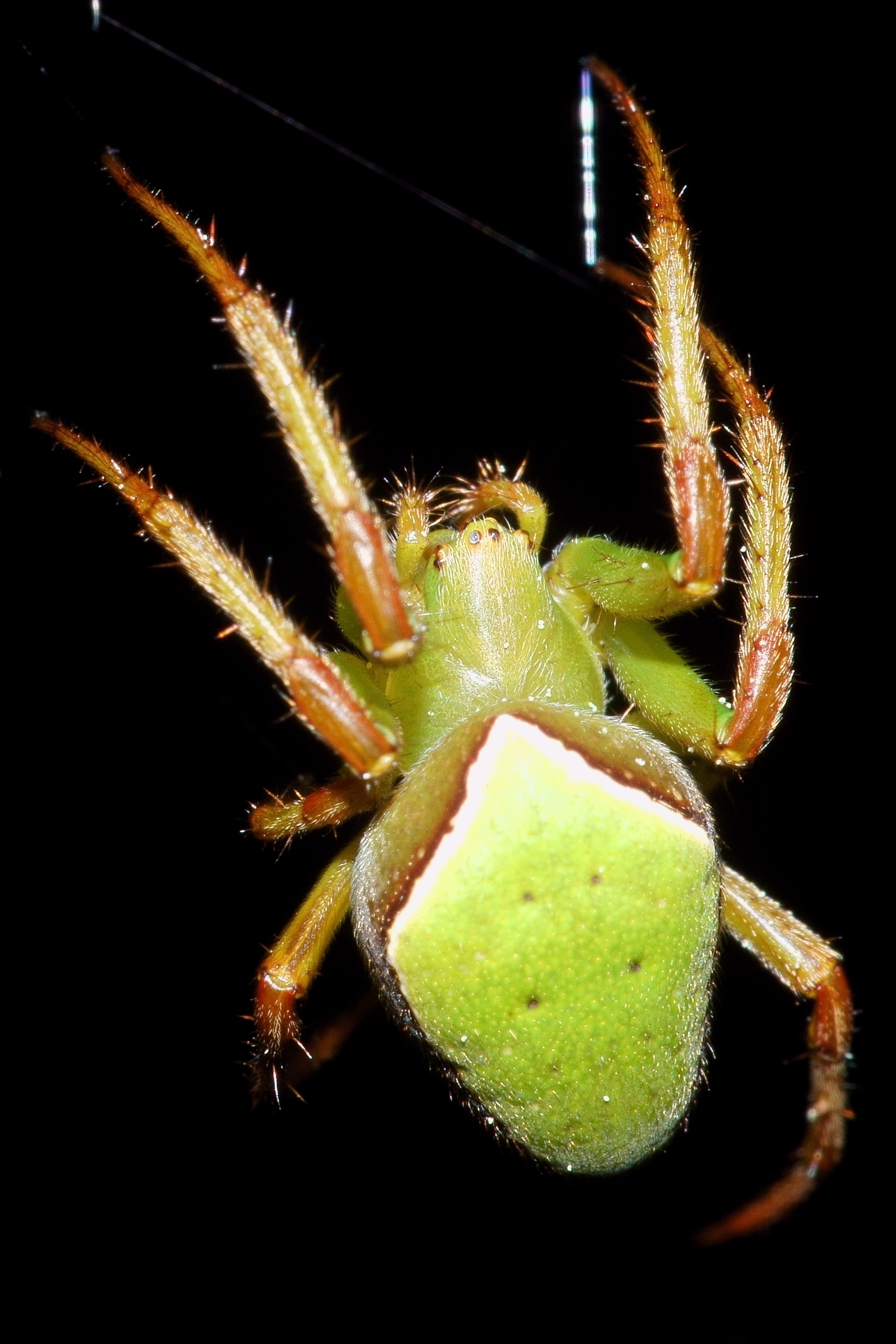

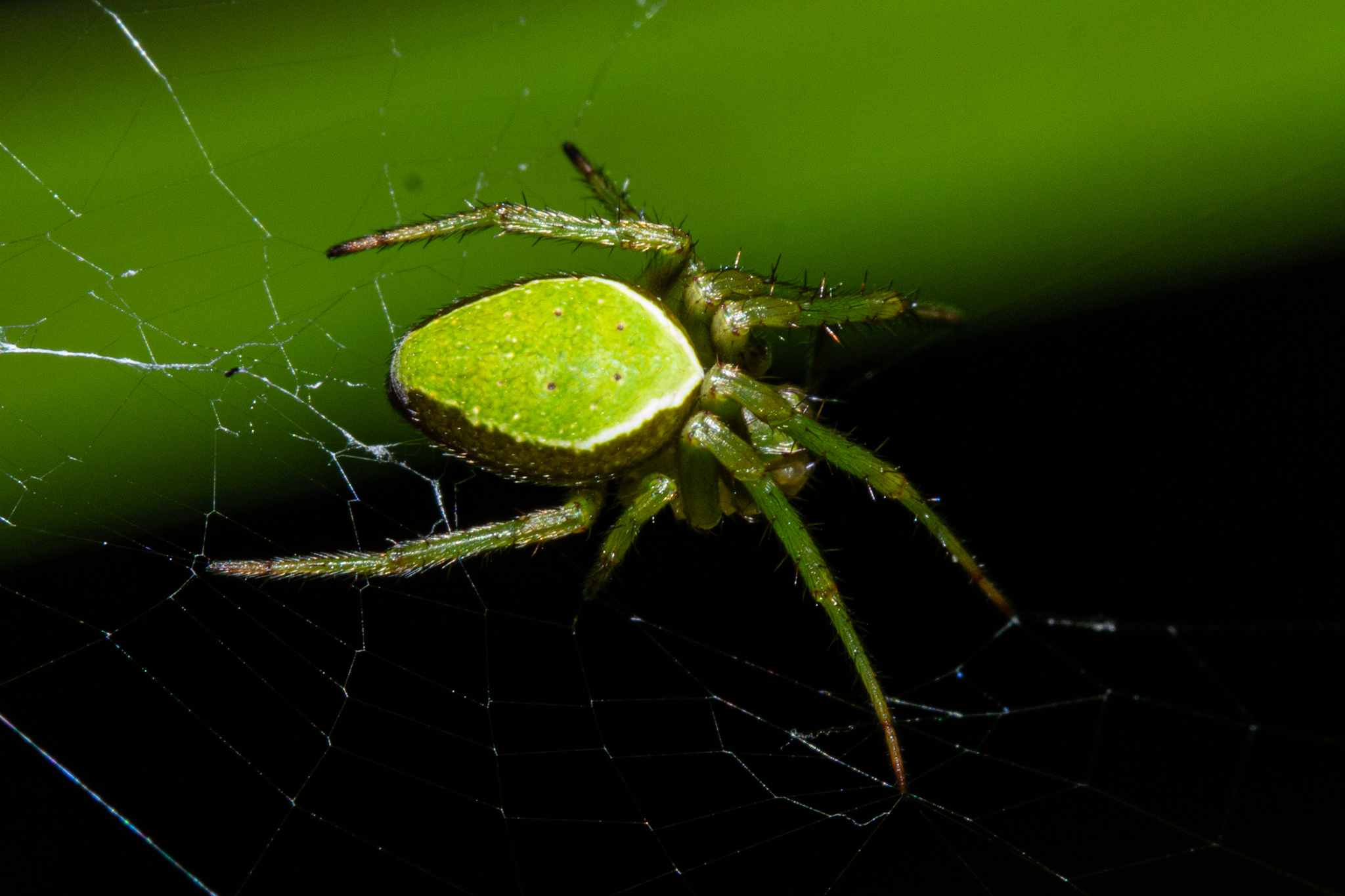

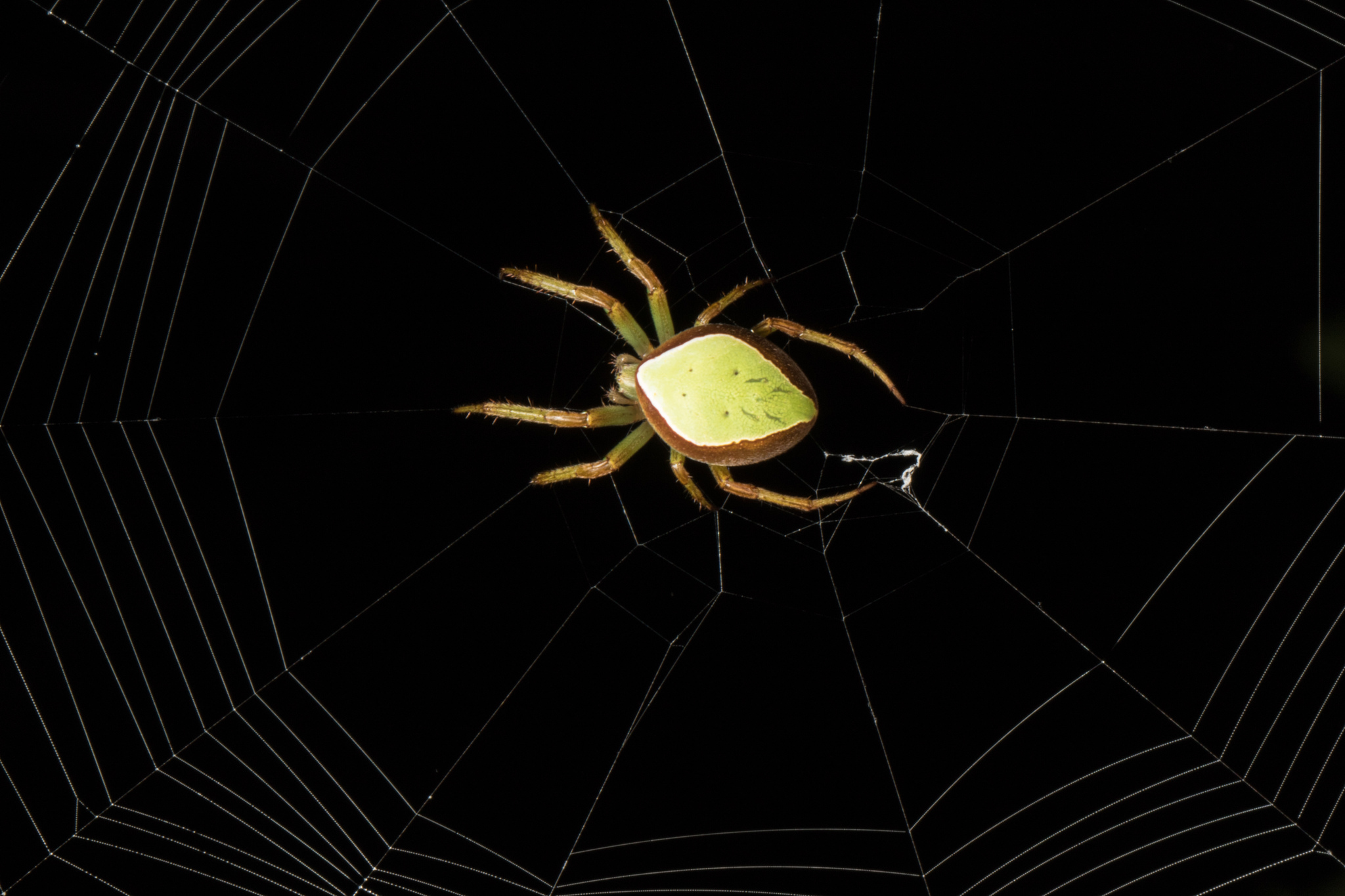
