= Spiny spider =

Spiny spider or spined spider is a common name for several species of spiders that exhibit spine-like projections on their body. It usually refers to:

- Austracantha minax, the Australian jewel spider or Christmas spider
- Gasteracantha, the spiny orb-weavers

It may also refer to:

- Micrathena

- Micrathena gracilis, the spined micrathena

- Poecilopachys

- Poecilopachys australasia, the two-spined spider

- Thelacantha

== See also ==
- Maja squinado, the spiny spider crab
- Libinia emarginata, the nine-spined spider crab
