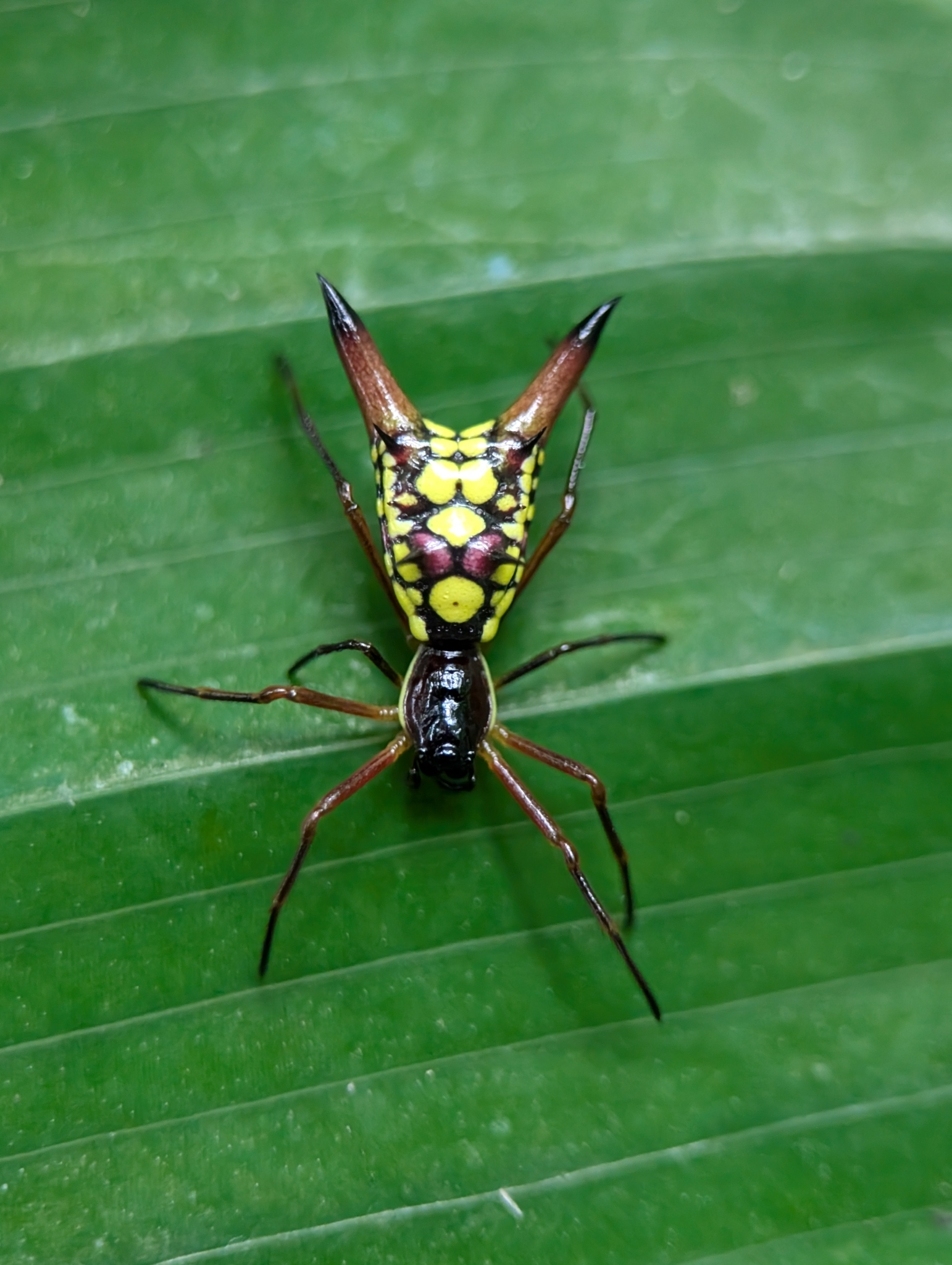
- female from Nicaragua

Scientific classification
- Kingdom: Animalia
- Phylum: Arthropoda
- Subphylum: Chelicerata
- Class: Arachnida
- Order: Araneae
- Infraorder: Araneomorphae
- Family: Araneidae
- Genus: Micrathena
- Species: M. brevipes

Binomial name
- Micrathena brevipes (O. Pickard-Cambridge, 1890)

Synonyms
- Acrosoma brevipes O. Pickard-Cambridge, 1890; Acrosoma sedes Gétaz, 1893; Micrathena sedes F. O. Pickard-Cambridge, 1904

= Micrathena brevipes =

Species of spider

Micrathena brevipes is a species of orb weaver spider in the genus Micrathena. It is found from southern Mexico to northern Panama.

== Description ==
The female of M. brevipes has distinctive long and slender forks projecting from the abdomen, with large anterior spines and small scars on the middle of each side. The total body length ranges from 7.9 to 9.9 mm in females. The carapace measures 3.5 mm long and 2.7 mm wide, while the abdomen has a characteristic shape that distinguishes it from related species.

Males are considerably smaller, measuring 4.0 to 4.3 mm in total length. The male carapace is shiny and dark brown to black, with the abdomen being orange with white pigment at the anterior and posterior ends. The legs are orange with dusky longitudinal lines on the upper surface.

== Distribution and habitat ==
M. brevipes has been recorded from Mexico to Panama. Specific collection localities include the state of Chiapas in Mexico, various provinces in Costa Rica, and Panama.

== Habitat ==
Females have been found in webs in low vegetation in dense jungle and forest environments.

== Taxonomy ==
The species was originally described as Acrosoma brevipes by O. Pickard-Cambridge in 1890. It was later transferred to the genus Micrathena by his nephew F. O. Pickard-Cambridge in 1904. The species Acrosoma sedes, described by MA Gétaz in 1893, was synonymized with M. brevipes by Levi in 1985.

The female of M. brevipes can be distinguished from the closely related M. sexspinosa by having longer, more slender abdominal forks, and from M. donaldi by differences in the structure of the epigynum.

== Etymology ==
The species name brevipes is derived from Latin, meaning "short-footed," referring to the relatively short legs of this species.
