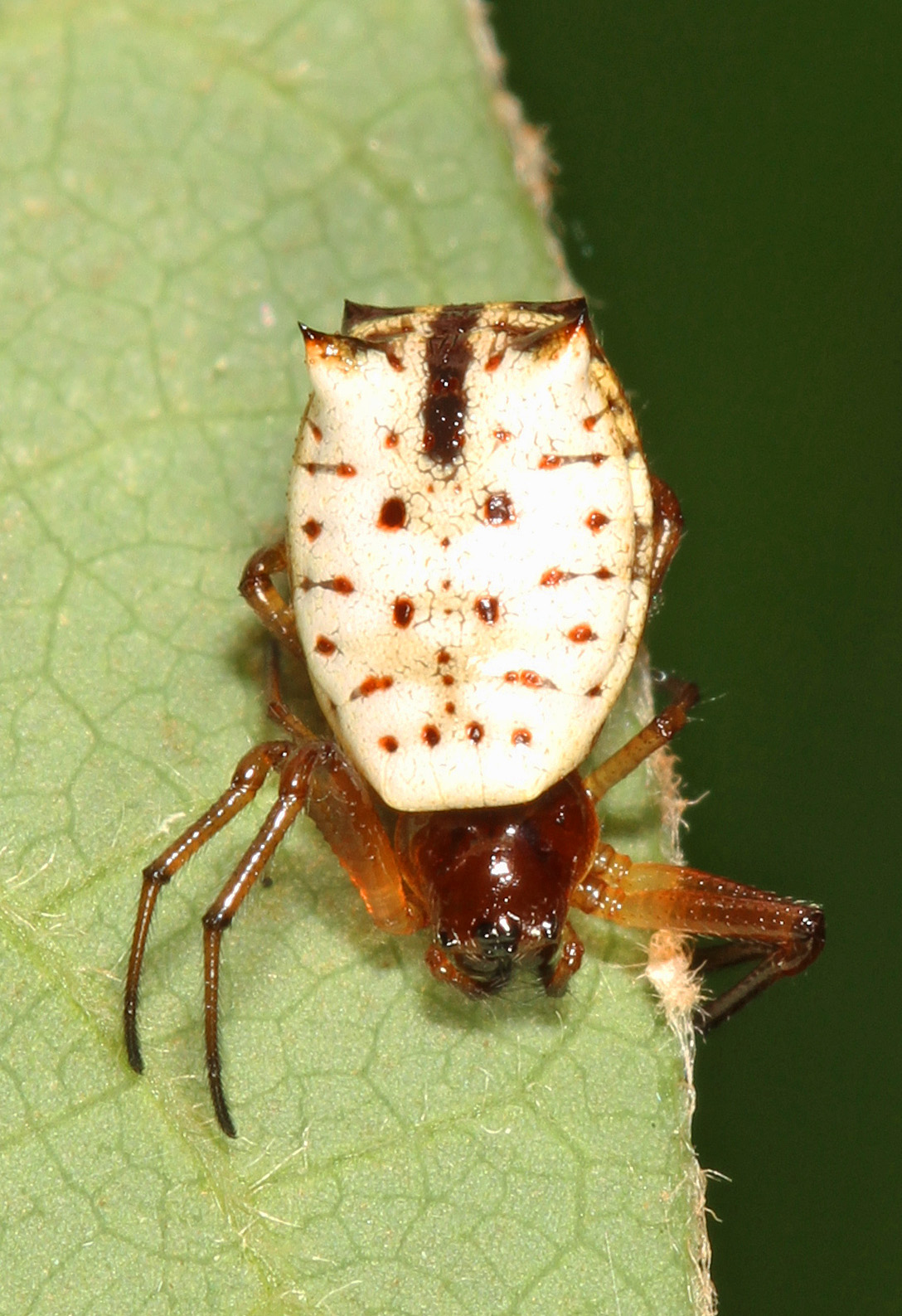

Scientific classification
- Kingdom: Animalia
- Phylum: Arthropoda
- Subphylum: Chelicerata
- Class: Arachnida
- Order: Araneae
- Infraorder: Araneomorphae
- Family: Araneidae
- Genus: Micrathena
- Species: M. mitrata

Binomial name
- Micrathena mitrata (Hentz, 1850)

= Micrathena mitrata =

Species of spider

Micrathena mitrata, the white micrathena, is a species of orb weaver in the spider family Araneidae. It is found in a range from the United States to Brazil. The spider has a distinctive appearance with a shiny, black abdomen and spiky, yellowish-brown legs. Its body length ranges from 4 to 9 mm in females and 3 to 4 mm in males. The species is known for its elaborate web, which it uses to capture insects for food. Micrathena mitrata is not considered dangerous to humans and is generally regarded as a harmless spider.

== Physiology ==
Micrathena mitrata, like all spiders, has a unique physiology that is well-adapted to its way of life. It has eight legs, covered in sensory hairs and spines, which are used for walking, climbing, and capturing prey. At the tip of its abdomen, it has several pairs of spinnerets, which produce different types of silk for various purposes, including web-building and wrapping prey. The spider also has venom glands that produce venom to subdue and kill its prey. This venom is injected into prey through its chelicerae, which serve as fangs. Spiders have a unique respiratory system, with flattened sacs called book lungs that exchange gases with the air, and tracheae, which carry air directly to the organs. Micrathena mitrata also has a specialized digestive system, using its chelicerae to inject digestive enzymes into its prey to break it down into a liquid that it can consume. It then uses its mouthparts to suck up the liquid and absorb nutrients. In summary, Micrathena mitrata has a physiology that is specialized for hunting, spinning webs, and thriving in its natural environment.

== Habitat ==
Micrathena mitrata is commonly found in North America, particularly in the eastern and central regions of the United States, as well as in Canada. The spider prefers wooded areas, especially near streams and other bodies of water, where it can build its web low to the ground, often near shrubs or trees. They are also known to inhabit fields and meadows, especially in grassy areas.

Micrathena mitrata is a versatile species that can adapt to a range of habitats, from rural to urban areas. However, the spider is most commonly found in natural environments with plenty of vegetation and insect prey.

Overall, Micrathena mitrata is a habitat generalist that can thrive in a range of environments, as long as it has access to prey and suitable places to build its web.

== Reproduction ==
Micrathena mitrata follows a typical reproductive process seen in many spider species. Male spiders initiate courtship by tapping the female's web to get her attention. Once the female has accepted the male's advances, he will transfer sperm into her reproductive organs using his pedipalps. The female may become aggressive after mating, and may even kill and consume the male, a behavior known as sexual cannibalism. The male's sacrifice is thought to increase the chances of his sperm fertilizing the female's eggs, and provide a source of nutrition for the developing offspring. After mating, the female will create an egg sac and fill it with fertilized eggs. The egg sac is usually attached to a nearby surface, and the female will guard it until the spider lings hatch. She may also provide food for them by regurgitating liquid prey. Overall, the reproductive process of Micrathena mitrata involves courtship, mating, egg-laying, and protection of the offspring. The behavior of sexual cannibalism is not unique to this species.

== Feeding ==
Micrathena mitrata is a carnivorous spider that feeds on insects and other small arthropods. Like other orb-weaving spiders, it constructs a circular web to catch its prey. The spider waits in the center of the web, monitoring the vibrations in the strands to detect when an insect has become trapped. When this happens, the spider quickly moves to the location of the prey and immobilizes it with its venomous bite.

The diet of Micrathena mitrata consists primarily of flying insects, such as flies, mosquitoes, and moths. The spider may also consume other spiders and small arthropods that become entangled in its web. In some cases, the spider may even cannibalize its own siblings or offspring if they get caught in its web.

Once the prey is immobilized, the spider uses its fangs to inject digestive enzymes into the body of the prey. These enzymes break down the internal tissues of the prey, which the spider can then consume as a liquid meal. The spider may also wrap the prey in silk to help hold it in place and to prevent it from falling out of the web.

Overall, Micrathena mitrata is a skilled predator that feeds on a range of insects and small arthropods that become trapped in its web. The spider's venomous bite and digestive enzymes allow it to efficiently consume its prey and gain the nutrients it needs to survive and reproduce.

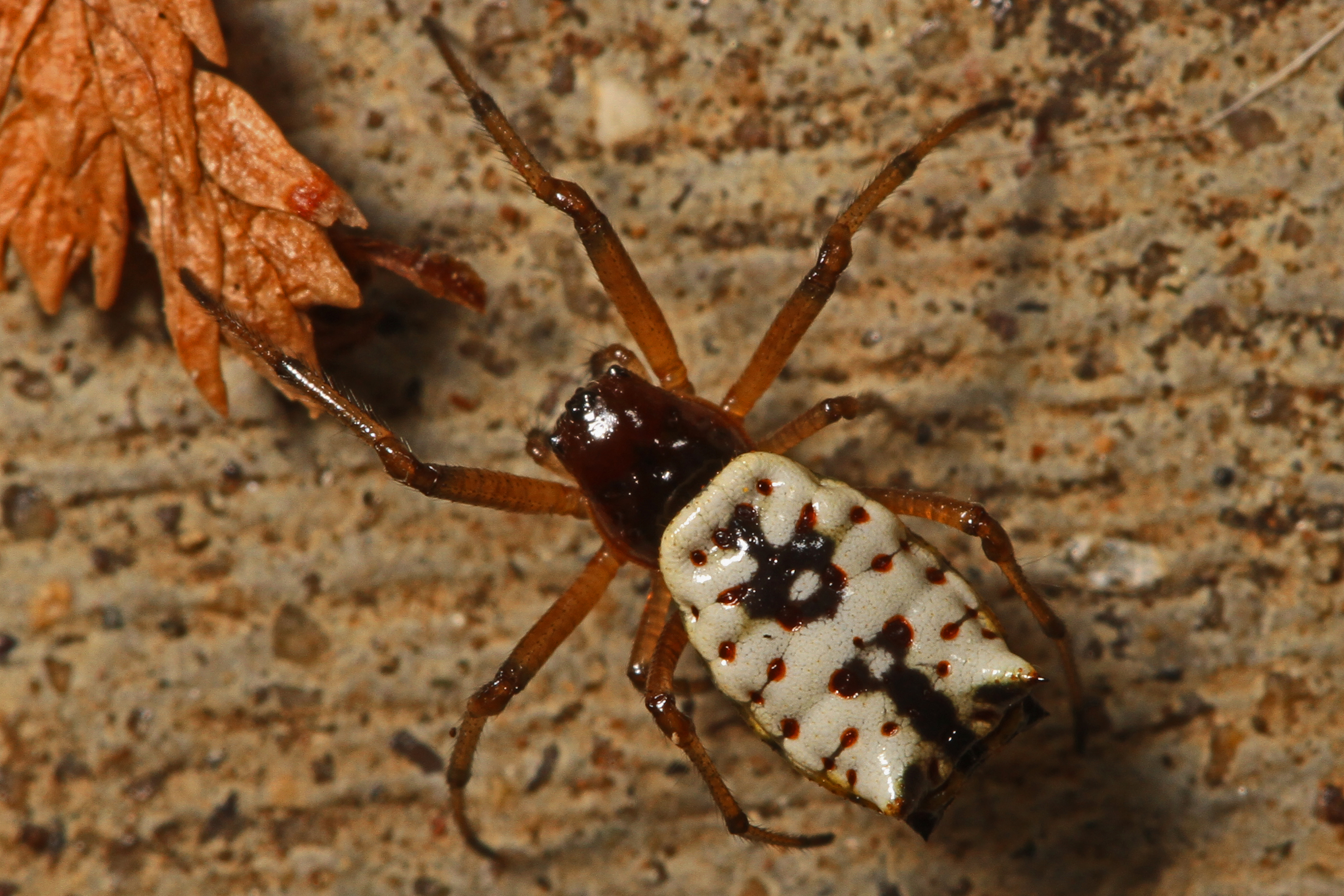
White micrathena, Micrathena mitrata
