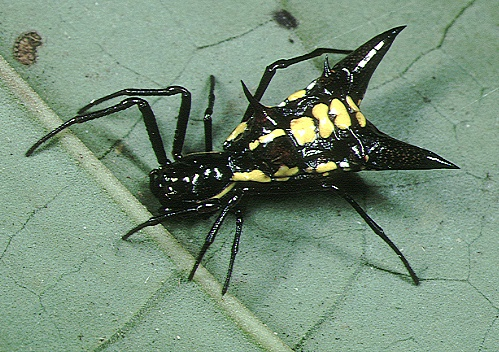
- female from Ecuador

Scientific classification
- Kingdom: Animalia
- Phylum: Arthropoda
- Subphylum: Chelicerata
- Class: Arachnida
- Order: Araneae
- Infraorder: Araneomorphae
- Family: Araneidae
- Genus: Micrathena
- Species: M. pichincha

Binomial name
- Micrathena pichincha Levi, 1985

= Micrathena pichincha =

Species of spider

Micrathena pichincha is a species of orb-weaver spider in the family Araneidae. It is endemic to Ecuador.

== Description ==
The female M. pichincha has a distinctively marked abdomen that is black and white with many small light spots on the underside. The abdomen has short, thick spines, with the first pair of spines being longer than the second pair. Females measure 10.7 mm in total length, with a carapace 3.9 mm long and 3.1 mm wide.

The male has a trapezoidal abdomen with three pairs of humps, the second pair being notably large. Males are considerably smaller than females, measuring 6.0 mm in total length with a carapace 2.5 mm long and 1.6 mm wide.

This species can be distinguished from other members of the M. sexspinosa group by its lack of pockets on the anterior slope of the bulge and the absence of a median lobe of the bulge overhanging the posterior. The female can be separated from others by the long grooves or pockets anteriorly on the epigynum, positioned on each side of a relatively small median lobe.

== Distribution ==
M. pichincha is found in north-central Ecuador, particularly in Pichincha Province. The species has been recorded from various locations including areas around Santo Domingo, Tandayapa, and Quito.

== Etymology ==
The specific name pichincha is a noun in apposition after the name of Pichincha Province in Ecuador, where the type locality is located.
