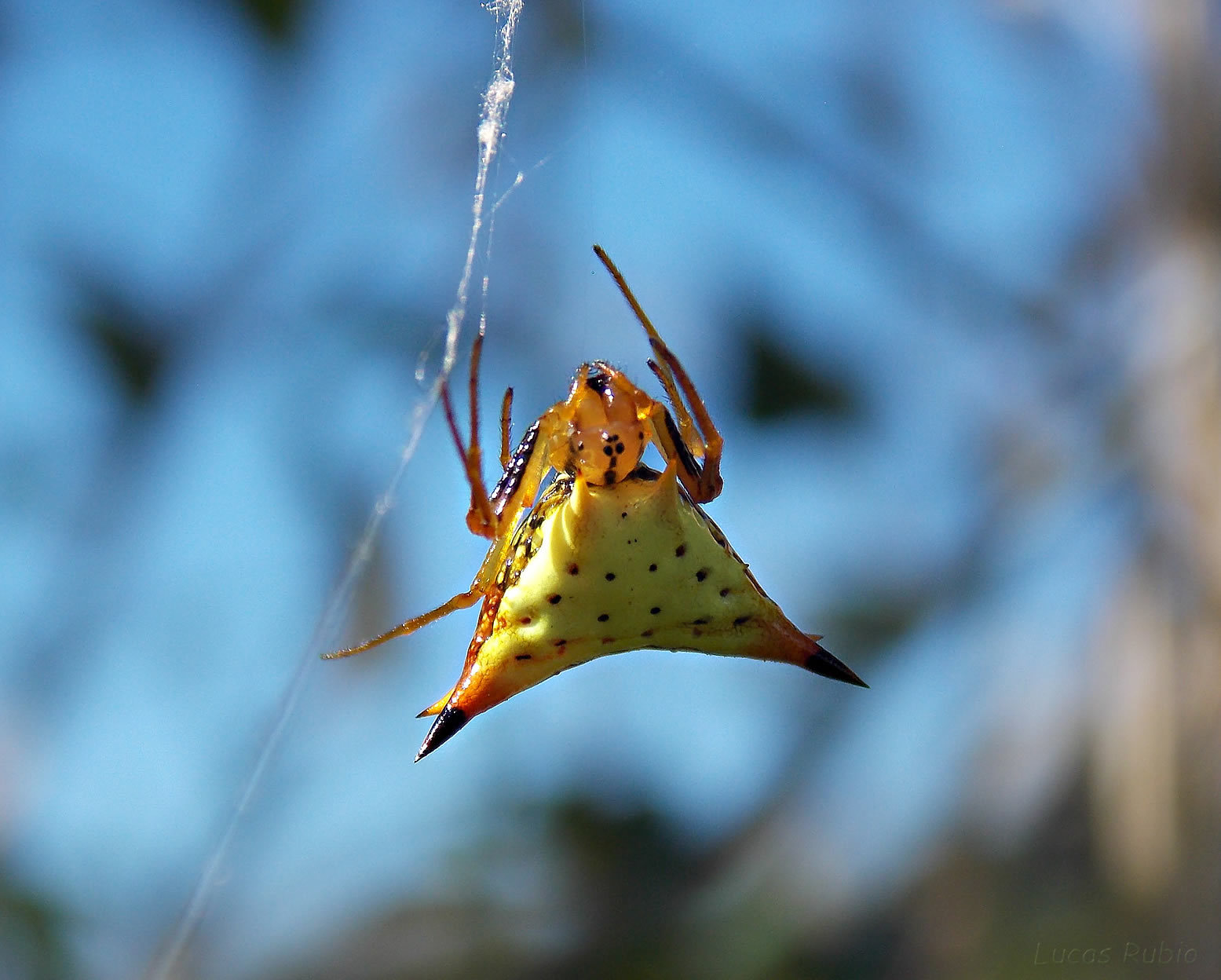

Scientific classification
- Domain: Eukaryota
- Kingdom: Animalia
- Phylum: Arthropoda
- Subphylum: Chelicerata
- Class: Arachnida
- Order: Araneae
- Infraorder: Araneomorphae
- Family: Araneidae
- Genus: Micrathena
- Species: M. furcata

Binomial name
- Micrathena furcata (Hahn, 1822)

= Micrathena furcata =

Species of spider

Micrathena furcata is a species from the genus Micrathena.
