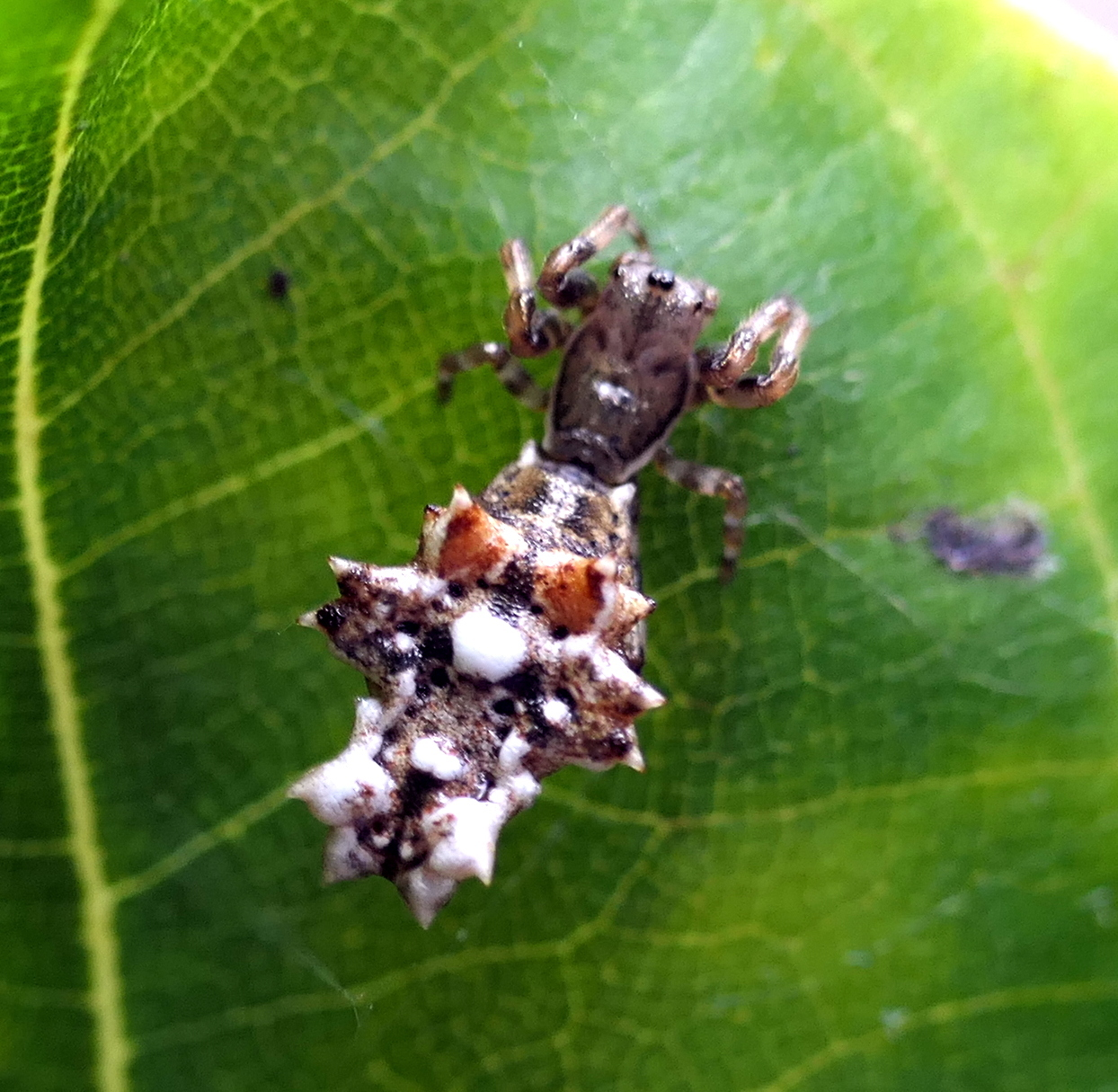
- female from Brazil

Scientific classification
- Kingdom: Animalia
- Phylum: Arthropoda
- Subphylum: Chelicerata
- Class: Arachnida
- Order: Araneae
- Infraorder: Araneomorphae
- Family: Araneidae
- Genus: Micrathena
- Species: M. horrida

Binomial name
- Micrathena horrida (Taczanowski, 1873)

Synonyms
- Acrosoma horrida Taczanowski, 1873; Acrosoma mammillatum Butler, 1873; Acrosoma raceminum Butler, 1873; Acrosoma longicaudum O. Pickard-Cambridge, 1890; Micrathena mammillata F. O. Pickard-Cambridge, 1904; Micrathena longicauda F. O. Pickard-Cambridge, 1904; Micrathena simoni Petrunkevitch, 1910; Micrathena mastonota Mello-Leitão, 1940; Micrathena multituberculata Caporiacco, 1947

= Micrathena horrida =

Species of spider

Micrathena horrida is a species of orb weaver spider in the genus Micrathena. It has a wide distribution from the Greater Antilles and Mexico to Argentina.

== Taxonomy ==
The species was first described by Taczanowski in 1873 as Acrosoma horrida from a female specimen collected in French Guiana. The species has had a complex taxonomic history with numerous synonyms that were gradually consolidated through the work of various arachnologists, most notably H. W. Levi in 1985, who synonymized several previously separate species including M. mammillata, M. longicauda, M. multituberculata, M. racemina, and M. simoni.

== Distribution ==
M. horrida has been recorded from the Greater Antilles (Cuba, Jamaica), Mexico to Argentina, including Central America (Belize, Guatemala, Honduras, El Salvador, Nicaragua, Costa Rica, Panama) and much of South America (Colombia, Venezuela, Guyana, Suriname, French Guiana, Brazil, Ecuador, Peru, Bolivia, Paraguay, Argentina).

== Habitat ==
M. horrida is found in forest environments throughout its range.

== Description ==
Females range from 7.0 to 11.5 mm in total length, while males are smaller at 4.5 to 5.0 mm. The female has an orange-brown carapace with darker brown sclerotized areas and some dark gray markings above the rim. The sternum and legs are orange-brown, while the abdomen is gray to orange with black markings. The abdomen typically bears twelve or more prominent humps or tubercles, distinguishing it from related species like M. gracilis which has only ten humps.

Males have a brown carapace and grayish brown sternum, with lighter brown legs. The male abdomen is brown with white patches along the margin and some gray and black pigment above. A distinctive feature of males is the segmented posterior abdomen. The male can be identified by characteristics of the palpus, particularly the paracymbium having a keel almost parallel to the axis of the cymbium.

Some individuals display a bold pattern of black patches on white on the dorsum of the abdomen. The carapace sometimes has dimples, and the abdomen of females may be slender with humps or have a tail-like extension.
