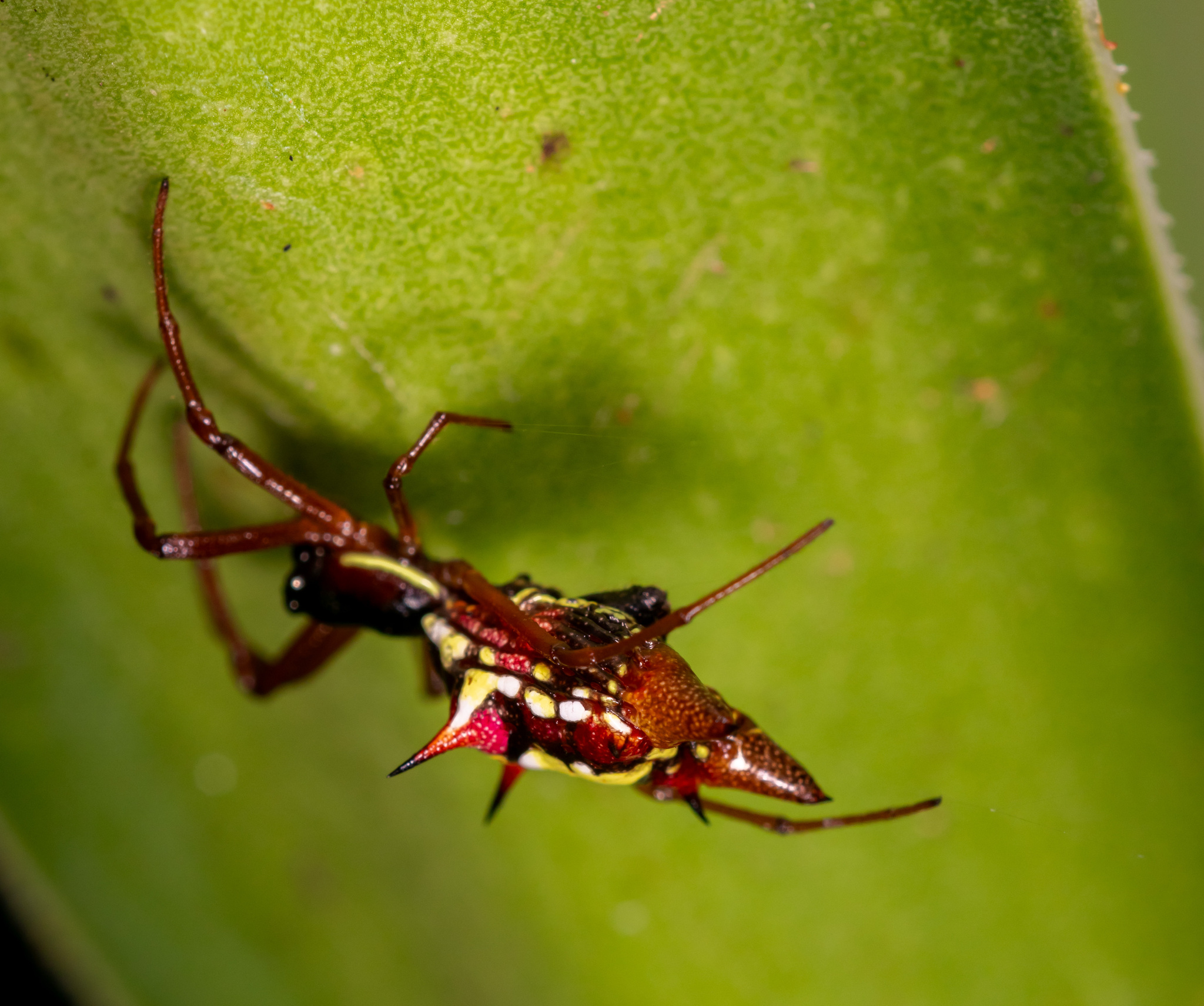
- female from Ecuador

Scientific classification
- Kingdom: Animalia
- Phylum: Arthropoda
- Subphylum: Chelicerata
- Class: Arachnida
- Order: Araneae
- Infraorder: Araneomorphae
- Family: Araneidae
- Genus: Micrathena
- Species: M. guayas

Binomial name
- Micrathena guayas Levi, 1985

= Micrathena guayas =

Species of spider

Micrathena guayas is a species of orb weaver spider in the family Araneidae. It is endemic to Ecuador.

== Distribution ==
M. guayas is known from western Ecuador, specifically from Guayaquil in Guayas Province.

== Description ==
The female has a dark brown head and thorax, with lighter orange coloration on the sides between the head and thorax. The sternum is dark brown with orange coloration toward the rear. The legs are light orange with orange distal segments, and the abdomen shows orange coloration. The posterior median eyes are positioned 1.3 diameters apart from other eyes, while the anterior median eyes are slightly more than their diameter apart. The posterior eyes are 1.5 diameters apart.

The species is characterized by having two short and stout posterior forks on the abdomen. The female reaches a total length of 8.5 mm, with a carapace measuring 3.2 mm long and 2.4 mm wide.

Like other species in the genus Micrathena, M. guayas has very short abdominal forks. Females can be distinguished from the related Micrathena anchicaya by having the posterior median lobe of the epigynum quite flat and indistinct, and by possessing the short light median septum.
