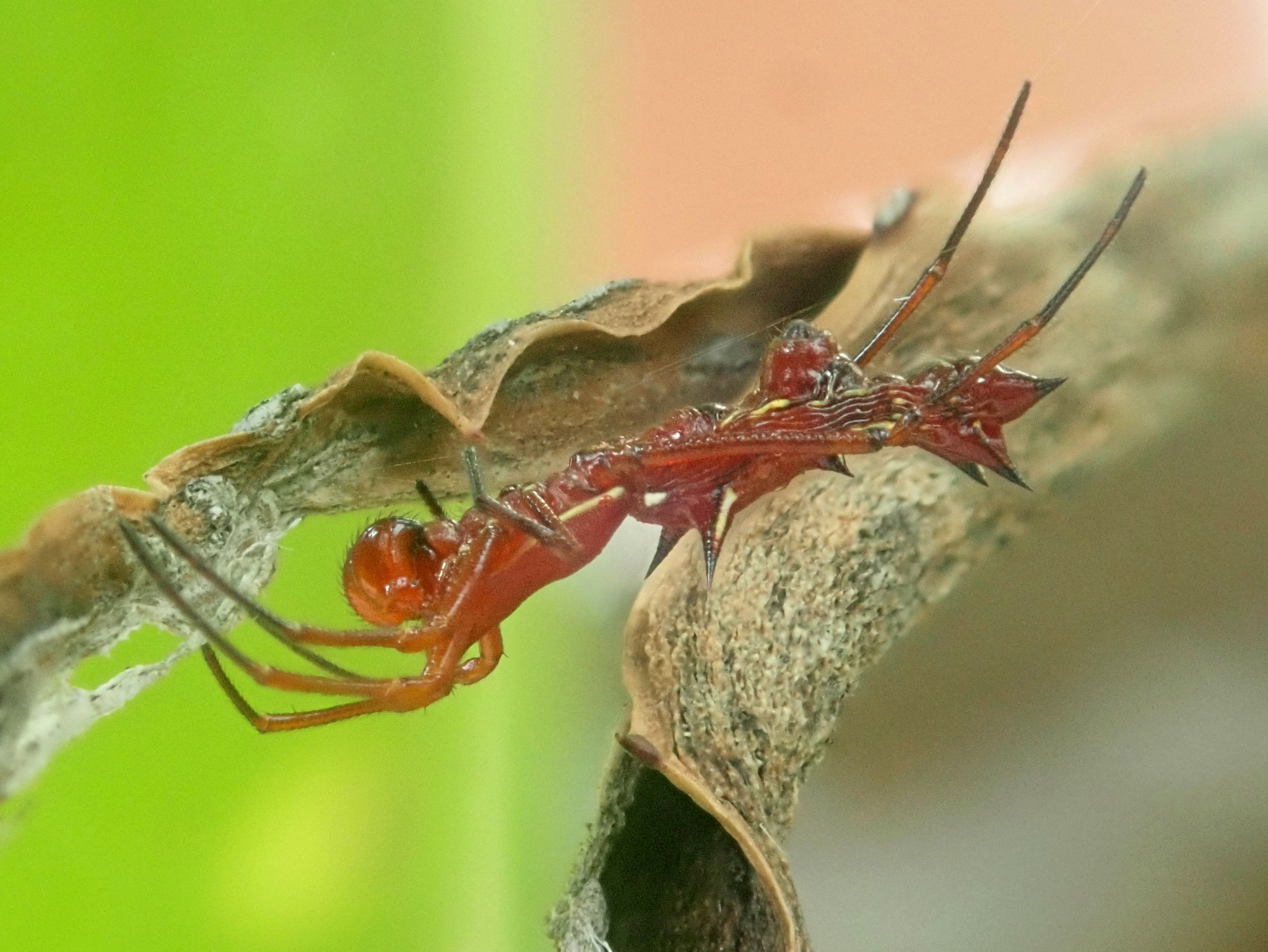

Scientific classification
- Kingdom: Animalia
- Phylum: Arthropoda
- Subphylum: Chelicerata
- Class: Arachnida
- Order: Araneae
- Infraorder: Araneomorphae
- Family: Araneidae
- Genus: Micrathena
- Species: M. swainsoni

Binomial name
- Micrathena swainsoni (Perty, 1833)

= Micrathena swainsoni =

Species of spider

Micrathena swainsoni is a species from the genus Micrathena.
