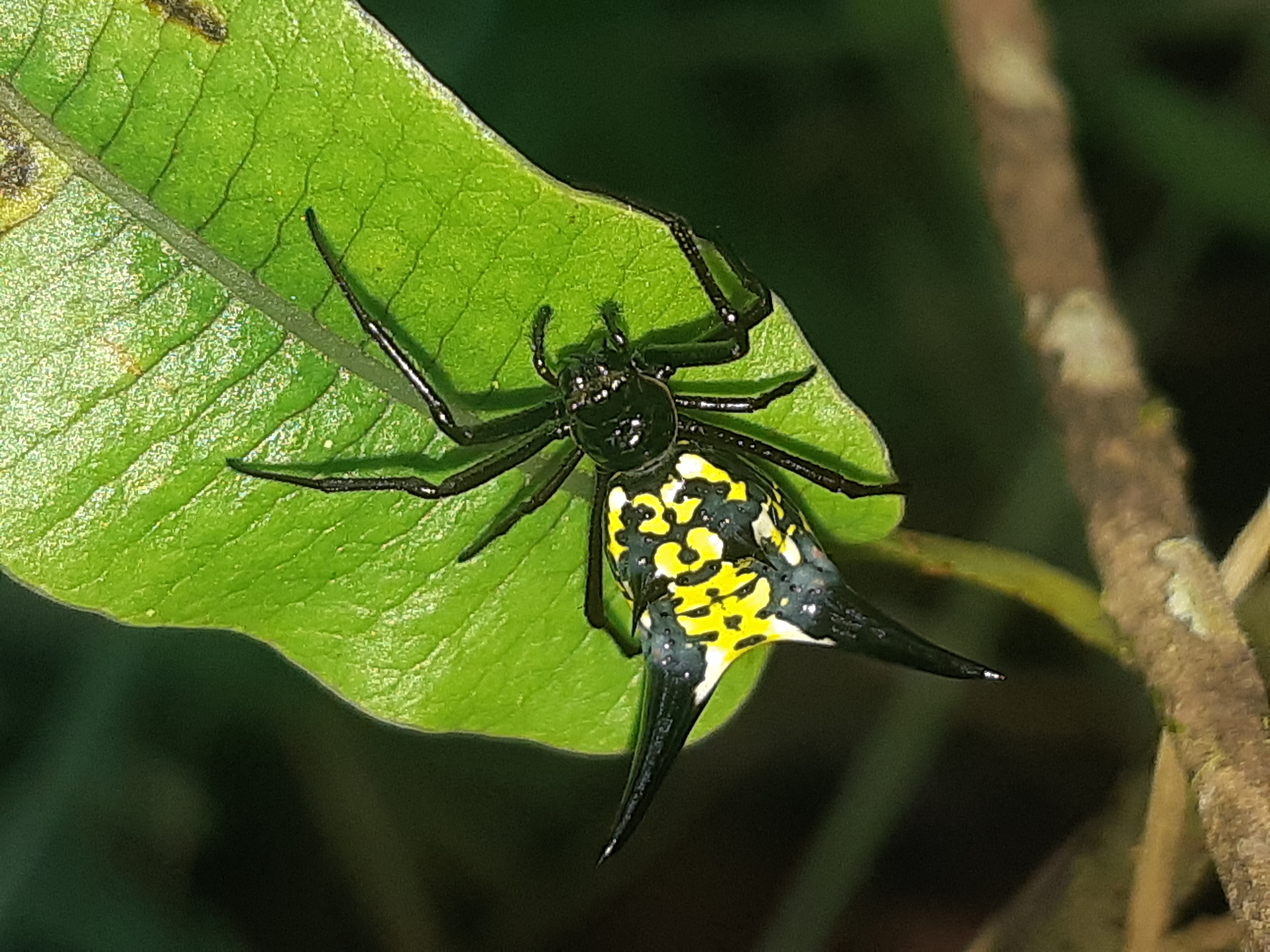
- female from Ecuador

Scientific classification
- Kingdom: Animalia
- Phylum: Arthropoda
- Subphylum: Chelicerata
- Class: Arachnida
- Order: Araneae
- Infraorder: Araneomorphae
- Family: Araneidae
- Genus: Micrathena
- Species: M. raimondi

Binomial name
- Micrathena raimondi (Taczanowski, 1879)

Synonyms
- Acrosoma raimondii Taczanowski, 1879

= Micrathena raimondi =

Species of spider

Micrathena raimondi is a species of orb weaver spider in the family Araneidae. It is found in Peru and Ecuador.

== Taxonomy ==
The species was originally described as Acrosoma raimondii by Taczanowski in 1879, based on a female holotype from Nanchoc District, Peru. It was transferred to the genus Micrathena by Petrunkevitch in 1911. The male was first described by Levi in 1985.

== Distribution ==
M. raimondi is recorded from Peru and Ecuador. In Peru, it has been found in the Department of Cajamarca, including the type locality near Nancho at 3,600 feet elevation. In Ecuador, specimens have been collected from Provincia Pichincha at elevations of 1,300-1,500 meters.

== Description ==
Like related species, Micrathena raimondi is sexually dimorphic, with females being larger than males.

The female has a brown carapace with a light eye region and thorax, while the sides of the thorax are dark with light rims. The sternum is dark brown, and the legs have brown coxae and distal segments. The abdomen features a distinctive black longitudinal band on each side between the spines, with white spots on the sides but none in the middle between the epigynum and spinnerets. The carapace has a deep transverse groove and narrow rim without dimples. Females typically measure 10.4 mm in total length, with a carapace length of 3.0 mm.

Males are considerably smaller and differently colored, with an orange carapace and brown sides. The sternum is dark brown, and the abdomen is speckled white with some dark marks on the corners and venter. Males measure 5.6 mm in total length with a carapace length of 2.6 mm.
