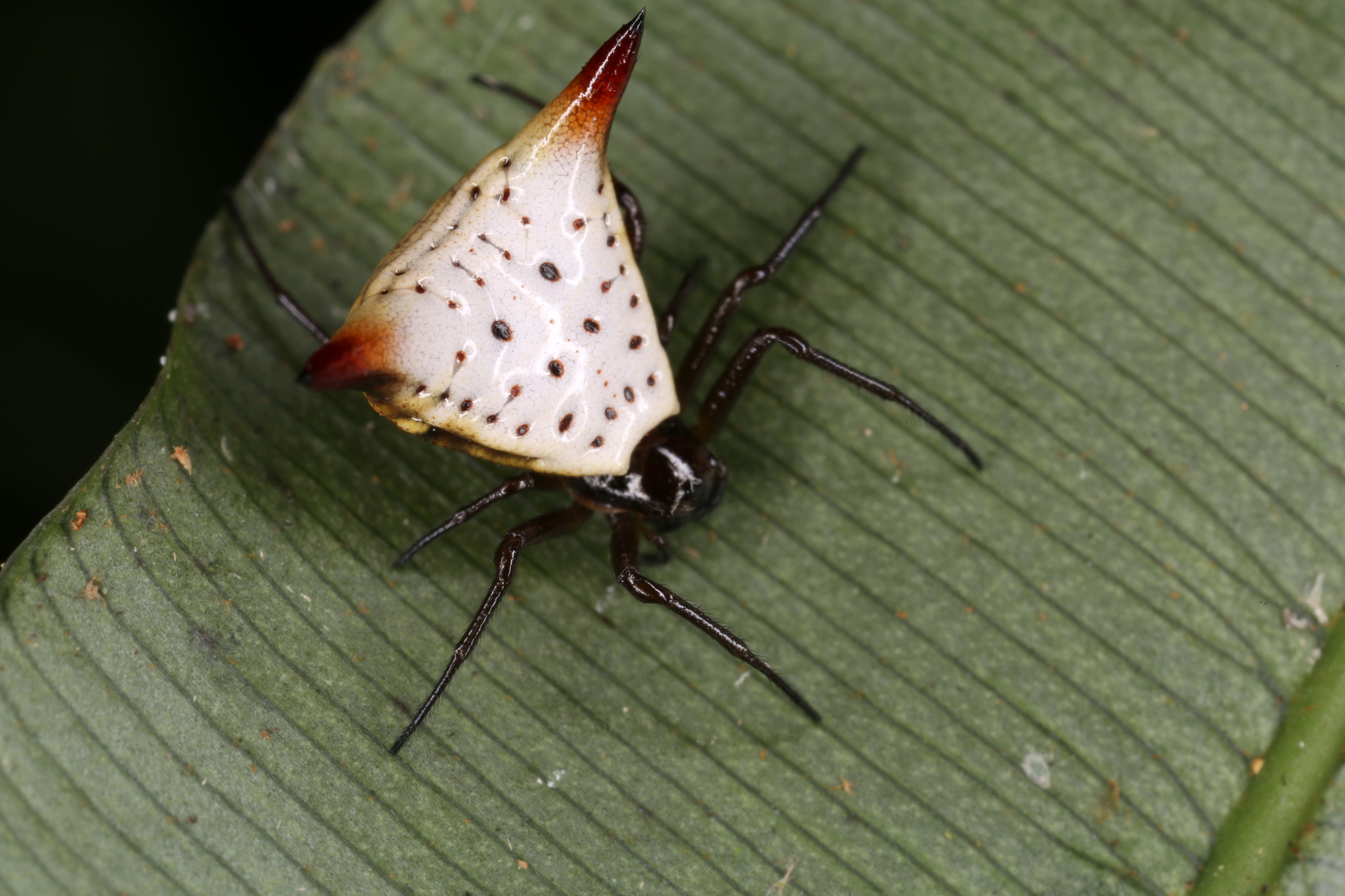
- female from Costa Rica

Scientific classification
- Kingdom: Animalia
- Phylum: Arthropoda
- Subphylum: Chelicerata
- Class: Arachnida
- Order: Araneae
- Infraorder: Araneomorphae
- Family: Araneidae
- Genus: Micrathena
- Species: M. bimucronata

Binomial name
- Micrathena bimucronata (O. Pickard-Cambridge, 1899)

Synonyms
- Acrosoma bimucronatum O. Pickard-Cambridge, 1899

= Micrathena bimucronata =

Species of spider

Micrathena bimucronata is a species of orb weaver spider in the family Araneidae. It is found in Central America, ranging from Mexico to Panama.

The species name is derived from Latin bi- "two" and mucro "sharp point of a sword", referring to the two spines.

== Distribution ==
M. bimucronata has been recorded from Guatemala to southern Colombia, with records from several countries in Central America. The species has been documented in Costa Rica, Panama, Colombia, Mexico, and Honduras.

== Habitat ==
Webs have been found in low vegetation and dense jungle environments in Costa Rica.

== Description ==
The female exhibits distinctive coloration with a brown carapace and orange head region. The rim of the thorax is narrow and light-colored, while the sternum is dark brown. The coxae and legs display lighter orange coloration. The dorsum of the abdomen is white with posterior spines that have some black pigmentation, and the sides show indistinct vertical black bands. The venter is white with transverse black bands running through the middle, with additional bands connecting posteriorly to the vertical bands.

The carapace is notably high with a U-shaped thoracic depression and two pairs of dimples. The abdomen features two posterior spines and minute denticles on the sides of the posterior half. Female total length measures 6.0 mm, with the carapace measuring 2.0 mm long and 1.9 mm wide.

Males are smaller and display orange coloration on the carapace and legs, with a dusky orange sternum. The dorsum of the abdomen shows white patches and indistinct black marks, while the venter appears blackish.

There is considerable size variation within the species, with females ranging from 4.5 to 6.2 mm in total length and males from 3.3 to 3.6 mm.

The species can be distinguished from related Micrathena species by its distinctive coloration pattern, which differs notably from M. rufopunctata, and by the wider epigynal septum in posterior view compared to other species in the genus.
