= Micrathena lepidoptera =

Scientific classification
- Domain: Eukaryota
- Kingdom: Animalia
- Phylum: Arthropoda
- Subphylum: Chelicerata
- Class: Arachnida
- Order: Araneae
- Infraorder: Araneomorphae
- Family: Araneidae
- Genus: Micrathena
- Species: M. lepidoptera

Binomial name
- Micrathena lepidoptera Mello-Leitão, 1941

Species of spider

Micrathena lepidoptera a species of orb weaver in the family Araneidae. This species has been found in Costa Rica and Colombia and is endemic to Sierras Nevadas of northern Colombia. Not much is known about this species, including its diet, life cycle, and reproduction. A study by Ivan F. Magalhaes and Alberto J. Santos saw members of the Micrathena group genetically tested to better organize the Micrathena and Chaetacis phylogenetic trees. This paper includes four synapomorphies for this species. These include: wrinkled booklung covers, epigynum with a pair of anterior apodemes, small copulatory openings that are concealed beneath lateral plates, and terminal apophysis that is fused to the embolus. The females of this species are distinct by having three compound spines on the each side of the abdomen, with a thoracic depression and dimples in the carapace and blunt spines on either side of the spinnerets.
