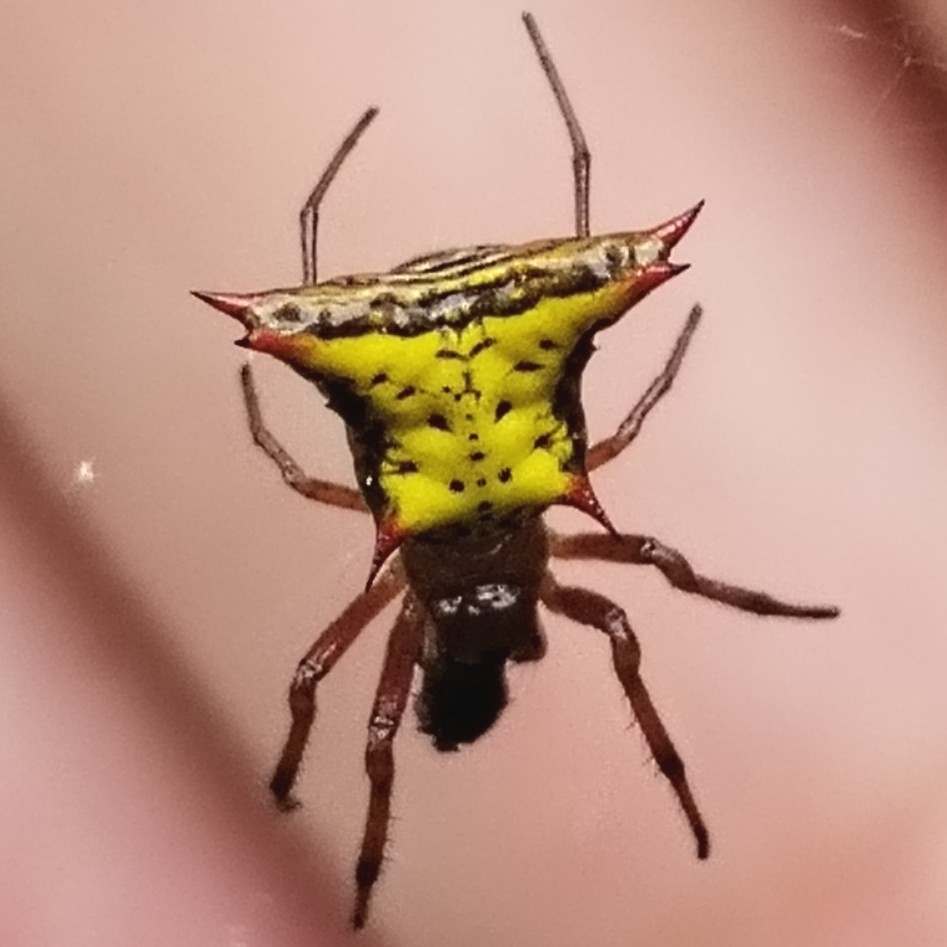
- female from Ecuador

Scientific classification
- Kingdom: Animalia
- Phylum: Arthropoda
- Subphylum: Chelicerata
- Class: Arachnida
- Order: Araneae
- Infraorder: Araneomorphae
- Family: Araneidae
- Genus: Micrathena
- Species: M. crassa

Binomial name
- Micrathena crassa (Keyserling, 1864)

Synonyms
- Acrosoma crassum Keyserling, 1864; Micrathena xanthopyga Simon, 1895; Micrathena tovarensis Simon, 1897; Micrathena aciculata Simon, 1897

= Micrathena crassa =

Species of spider

Micrathena crassa is a species of orb-weaver spider in the family Araneidae. It is found from Costa Rica to Argentina.

== Distribution ==
M. crassa has been recorded from Costa Rica south to Argentina, including Venezuela, Colombia, Ecuador, Peru, and other South American countries.

== Habitat ==
This species is typically found in cloud forests and montane environments. Specimens have been collected in areas such as Monteverde, Costa Rica, at elevations around 1,600 meters.

== Description ==
Micrathena crassa is a medium-sized orb-weaver spider with distinctive spiny projections on its abdomen.

Females have a total length from 5.0 to 7.7 mm, with a carapace measuring 2.3 mm long and 1.9 mm wide. The carapace and legs are orange-brown in coloration. The abdomen is notably spiny, with white coloration and dark brown sclerotized areas on the sides and posterior portions. The dorsum features white areas with spines, and there are typically four pairs of dorsal spines arranged on the abdomen. There is a distinctive groove between the head and thorax regions, and the abdomen may have small anterior lobes above the carapace.

Males are smaller than females, with specimens from Peru showing a total length of 4.4 mm and a carapace length of 1.8 mm. Male coloration differs slightly, with a dark olive-brown carapace that is darker on the sides, and whitish coxae and legs.

The species can be distinguished from related Micrathena species by its spination pattern and the deep groove across the carapace.

== Taxonomy ==
The species was originally described as Acrosoma crassum by Keyserling in 1864. It was later transferred to the genus Micrathena by Simon in 1895. Several species that were previously considered distinct, including M. xanthopyga, M. tovarensis, and M. aciculata, were synonymized with M. crassa by Levi in 1985 following detailed morphological analysis.
