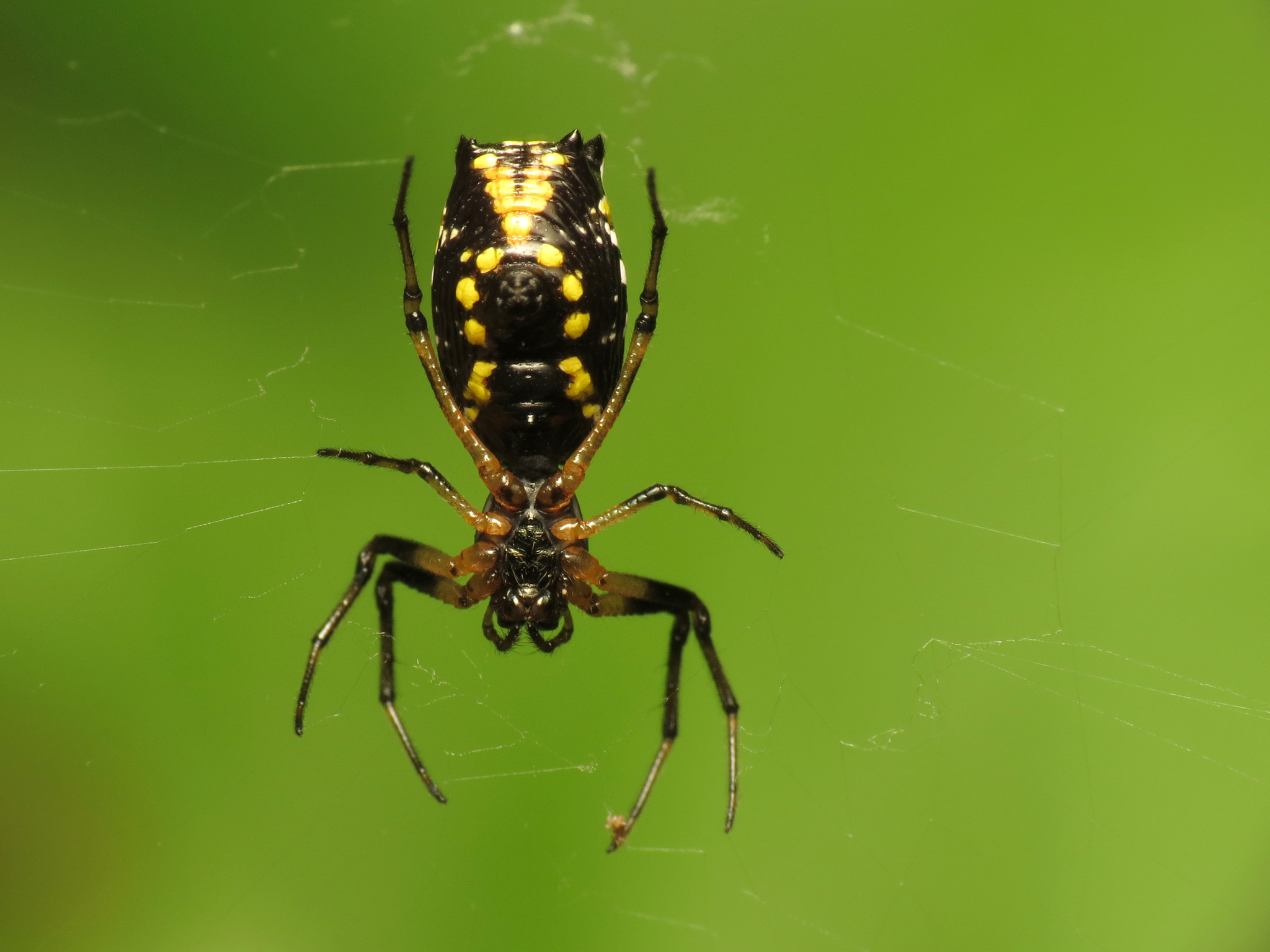

Scientific classification
- Domain: Eukaryota
- Kingdom: Animalia
- Phylum: Arthropoda
- Subphylum: Chelicerata
- Class: Arachnida
- Order: Araneae
- Infraorder: Araneomorphae
- Family: Araneidae
- Genus: Micrathena
- Species: M. funebris

Binomial name
- Micrathena funebris (Marx, 1898)

= Micrathena funebris =

Species of spider

Micrathena funebris is a species of orb weaver in the spider family Araneidae. It is found in a range from the United States to Costa Rica.
