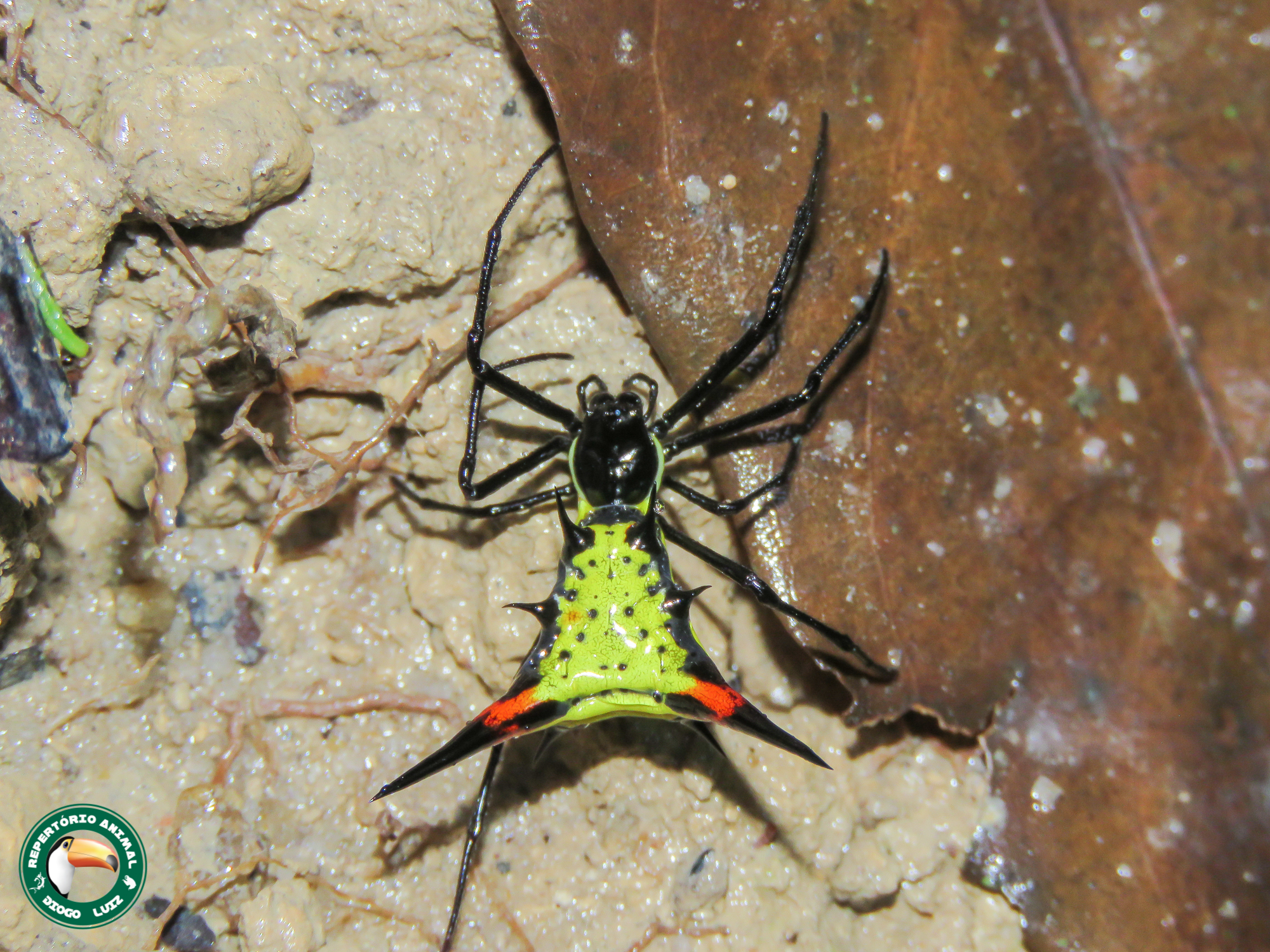

Scientific classification
- Domain: Eukaryota
- Kingdom: Animalia
- Phylum: Arthropoda
- Subphylum: Chelicerata
- Class: Arachnida
- Order: Araneae
- Infraorder: Araneomorphae
- Family: Araneidae
- Genus: Micrathena
- Species: M. schreibersi

Binomial name
- Micrathena schreibersi (Perty, 1833)

= Micrathena schreibersi =

Species of spider

Micrathena schreibersi, also known by its common name Amazon thorn spider, is a species from the genus Micrathena.
