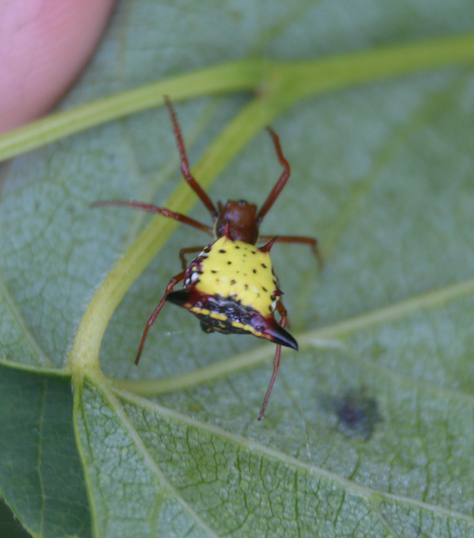

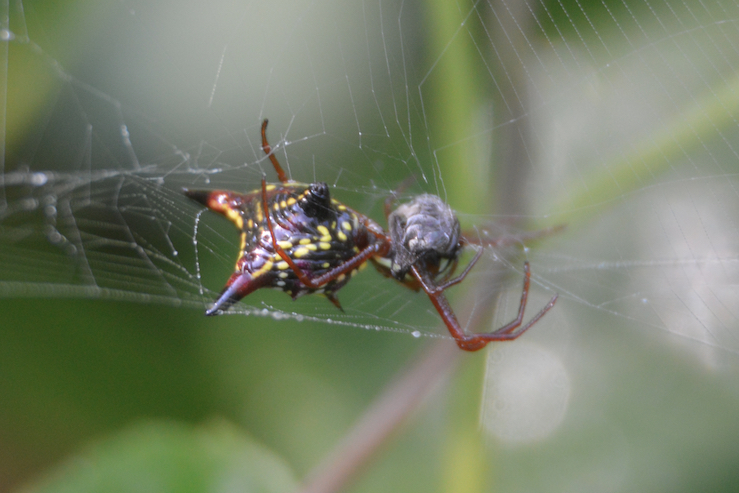
- Micrathena sagittata, female, upper and lower view

Scientific classification
- Domain: Eukaryota
- Kingdom: Animalia
- Phylum: Arthropoda
- Subphylum: Chelicerata
- Class: Arachnida
- Order: Araneae
- Infraorder: Araneomorphae
- Family: Araneidae
- Genus: Micrathena
- Species: M. sagittata

Binomial name
- Micrathena sagittata (Walckenaer, 1841)

= Micrathena sagittata =

Species of spider

Micrathena sagittata, also known as the arrow-shaped micrathena, is a species of spider belonging to the family Araneidae. It is found in the eastern United States and throughout Central America.

This is a striking spider with a distinctive arrow-shaped abdomen which is largely yellow, with black depressions above and variable red and black patterning below. There are 3 pairs of tubercles that are tipped with black and red at the base. The pair of tubercles at the back end of the abdomen are rather large and point outward, forming two corners of the triangular, arrow-shaped body. Females can grow up to 9 millimetres (0.35 in) in length (excluding legs), while males are smaller at 5 millimetres (0.20 in). The males lack spines and are rarely seen.

The genus name is derived from the Greek "micro," meaning "small," and the goddess Athena. The species name sagittata is Latin meaning "arrowed, in the form of an arrow" referring to the shape of the abdomen.

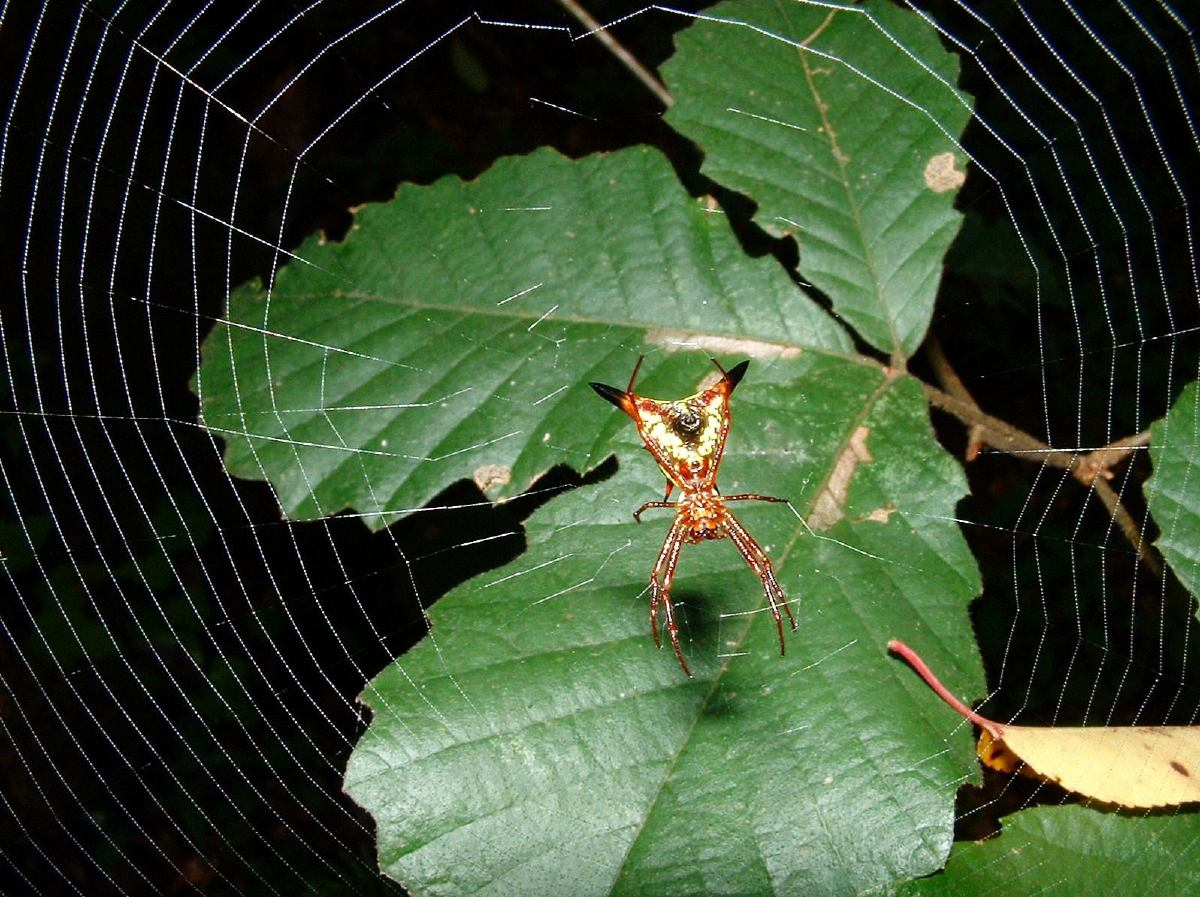
Micrathena sagittata and web, Gadsden Co. Florida.

== General references ==
- Preston-Mafham, Ken (1998). Spiders: Compact Study Guide and Identifier. Angus Books. ISBN 978-1-904594-93-2.
- Kaston, B. J. (1978). How to Know the Spiders. WCB/McGraw-Hill. ISBN 0-697-04898-5.
- Levi, Herbert W.; Levi, Lorna R.; Strekalovsky, Nicholas (2001). Spiders and Their Kin: A Golden Guide from St. Martin's Press. St. Martin's Press. ISBN 1-582-38156-9.
