= Micrathena yanomami =

Scientific classification
- Domain: Eukaryota
- Kingdom: Animalia
- Phylum: Arthropoda
- Subphylum: Chelicerata
- Class: Arachnida
- Order: Araneae
- Infraorder: Araneomorphae
- Family: Araneidae
- Genus: Micrathena
- Species: M. yanomami

Binomial name
- Micrathena yanomami Magalhães & Santos, 2011

Species of spider

Micrathena yanomami is a species of orb-weaver spider described in 2011. Its distribution includes French Guiana, Brazil, and Peru. The species was first described by arachnologists Ivan Magalhães and Adalberto Santos.

== Etymology ==
Micrathena is derived from the Greek word for "small" and the goddess Athena, who specialized in weaving and spinning. The species name refers to the Yanomami people, as the spider was discovered on the Pico da Neblina, which is localized within Yanomami territory.

== Description ==
The genus Micrathena consists of spiny orb-weaving spiders, possessing modifications such as the two pointed ends on either side of the abdomen of M. yanomami. Owing to the prominence of sexual dimorphism among spiny orb-weavers, only female traits have been able to be thoroughly identified. Because males of this species appear so similar to other males of closely related species, they had not been described until 2017. Characteristics that separate female M. yanomami from other species of the triangularispinosa group include a black line that goes completely around the edge of the carapace as well as around the eyes, and granulation around the sides of the carapace and the inferior surfaces of the femora. The carapace is orange-brown while the chelicerae and legs are brown. The abdomen is yellow on the dorsal surface and dark brown along the sides. A dark brown band connects the two largest caudal spines, which are bright red. There are a total of four pairs of spines on the abdomen, which is in the general shape of a triangle.
