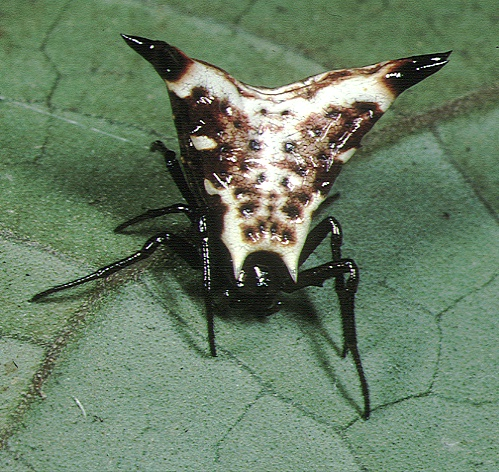

Scientific classification
- Domain: Eukaryota
- Kingdom: Animalia
- Phylum: Arthropoda
- Subphylum: Chelicerata
- Class: Arachnida
- Order: Araneae
- Infraorder: Araneomorphae
- Family: Araneidae
- Genus: Micrathena
- Species: M. lucasi

Binomial name
- Micrathena lucasi (Keyserling, 1864)

= Micrathena lucasi =

Species of spider

Micrathena lucasi is a spider in the orb-weaver spider family, Araneidae. The species belongs to genus Micrathena and was first named in 1864 by Eugen von Keyserling.
