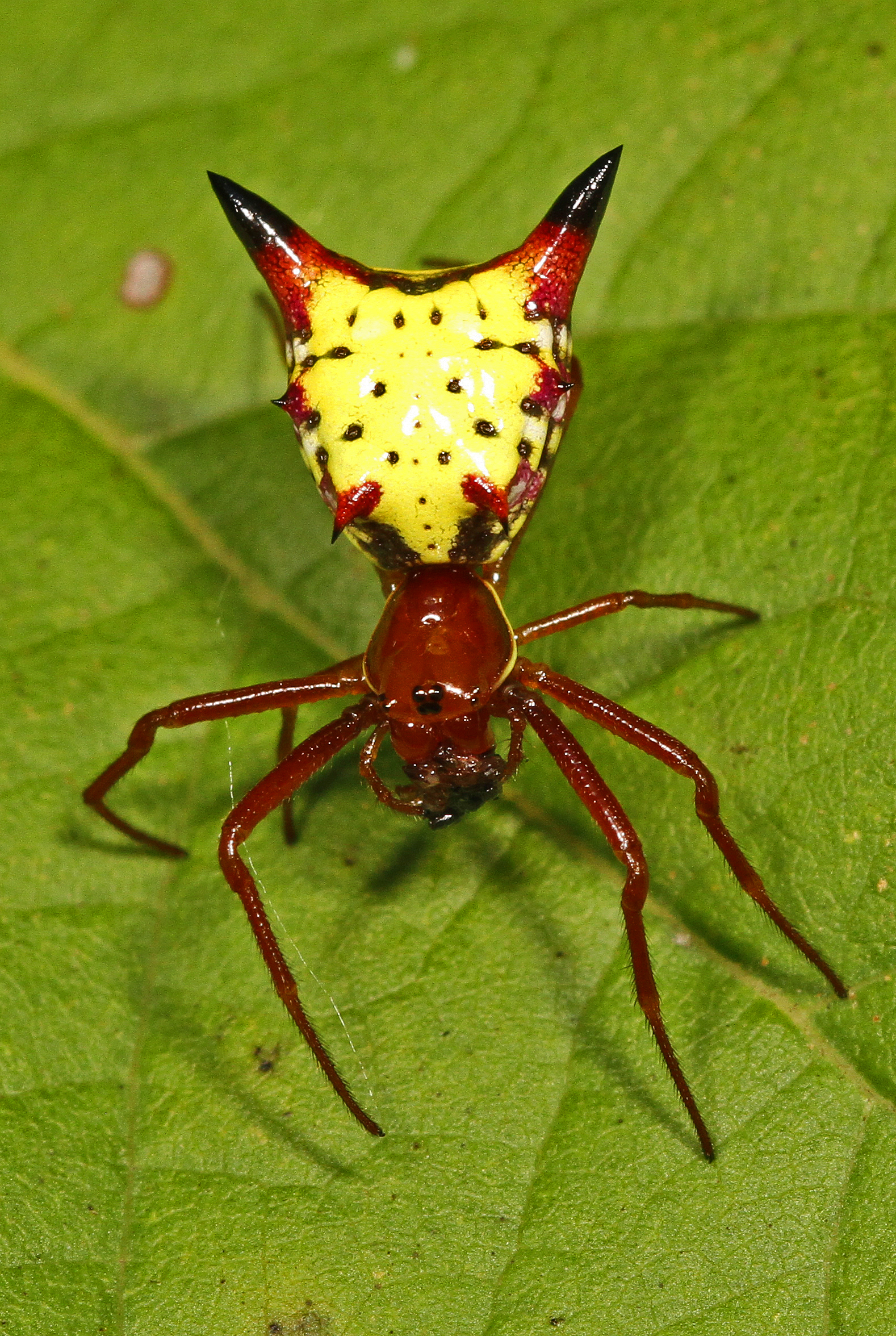
- Micrathena sagittata in Virginia, USA

Scientific classification
- Kingdom: Animalia
- Phylum: Arthropoda
- Subphylum: Chelicerata
- Class: Arachnida
- Order: Araneae
- Infraorder: Araneomorphae
- Family: Araneidae
- Genus: Micrathena; Sundevall, 1833

Type species
- Micrathena aureola (C. L. Koch, 1836)

Species
- 119, see text

Synonyms
- Chaetacis Simon, 1895; Ildibaha Keyserling, 1892; Thaumastobella Mello-Leitão, 1945

= Micrathena =

Genus of spiders

Micrathena, known as spiny orbweavers, is a genus of orb-weaver spiders first described by Carl Jakob Sundevall in 1833. Micrathena contains more than a hundred species, most of them Neotropical woodland-dwelling species. The name is derived from the Greek "micro", meaning "small", and the goddess Athena.

Species with extremely long spines evolved at least eight times in the genus Micrathena and likely function as anti-predator defenses. Gasteracantha orb-weavers also have hardened abdomens with variously shaped spines, but they are not closely related to Micrathena within the orb-weaver family.

These spiders are active during the daytime and build vertical orb webs. Unlike many other orb-weavers, members of Micrathena bite their prey before wrapping it. When laying eggs, females will place the egg sac on vegetation near the web.

== Species ==
As of November 2026 the genus Micrathena contains 117 species:

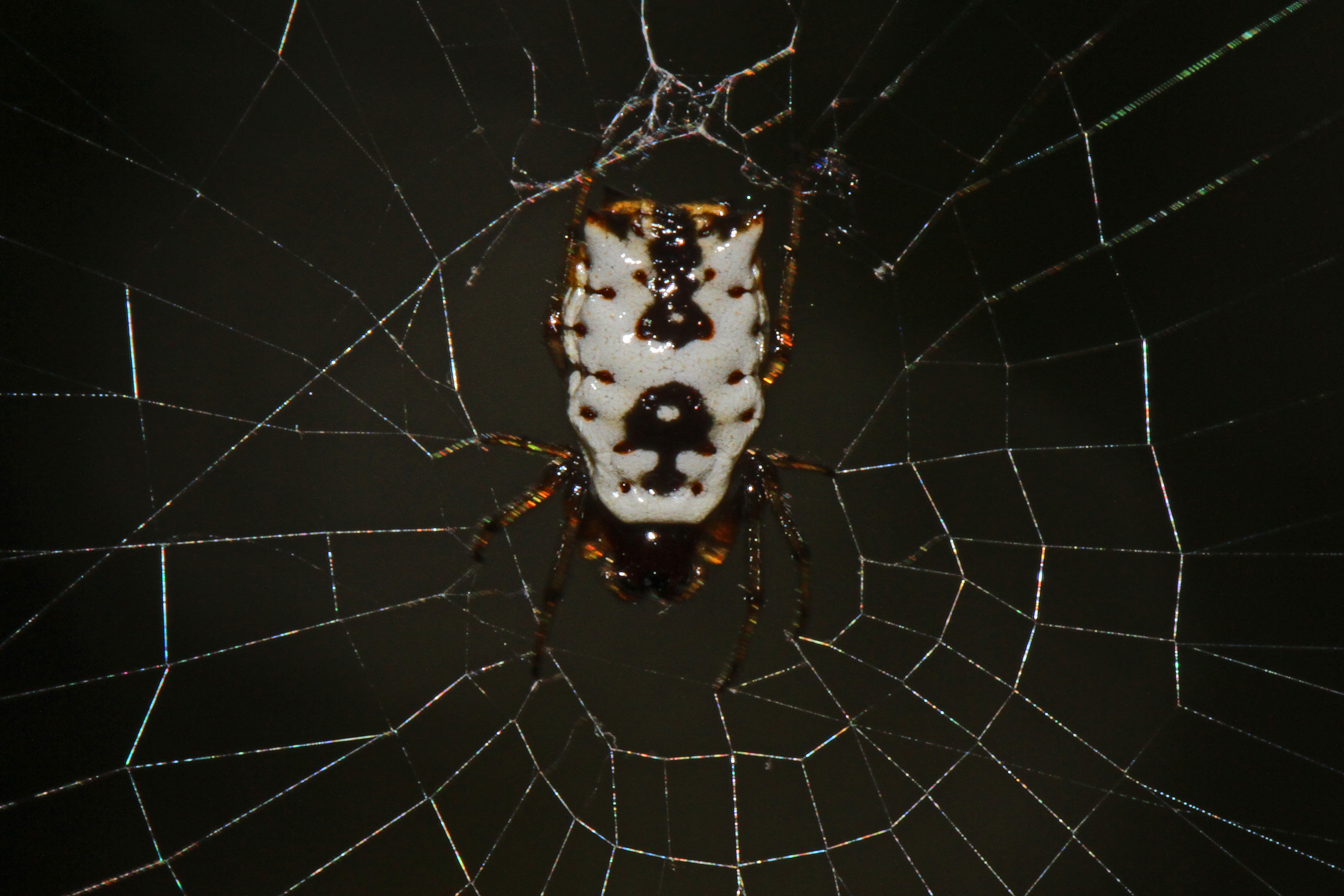
Micrathena mitrata in Alabama, USA

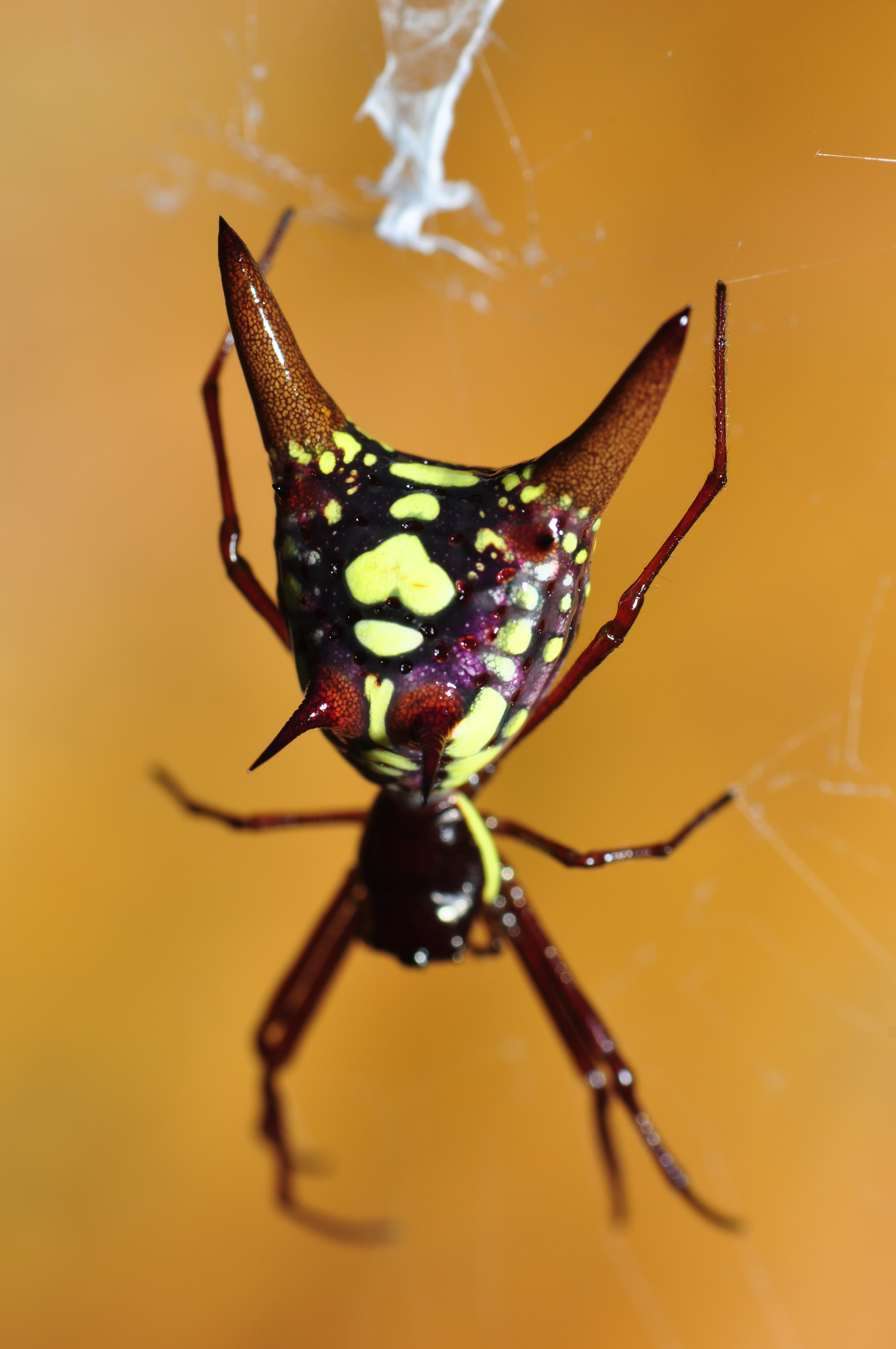
Micrathena sexpinosa in Panama

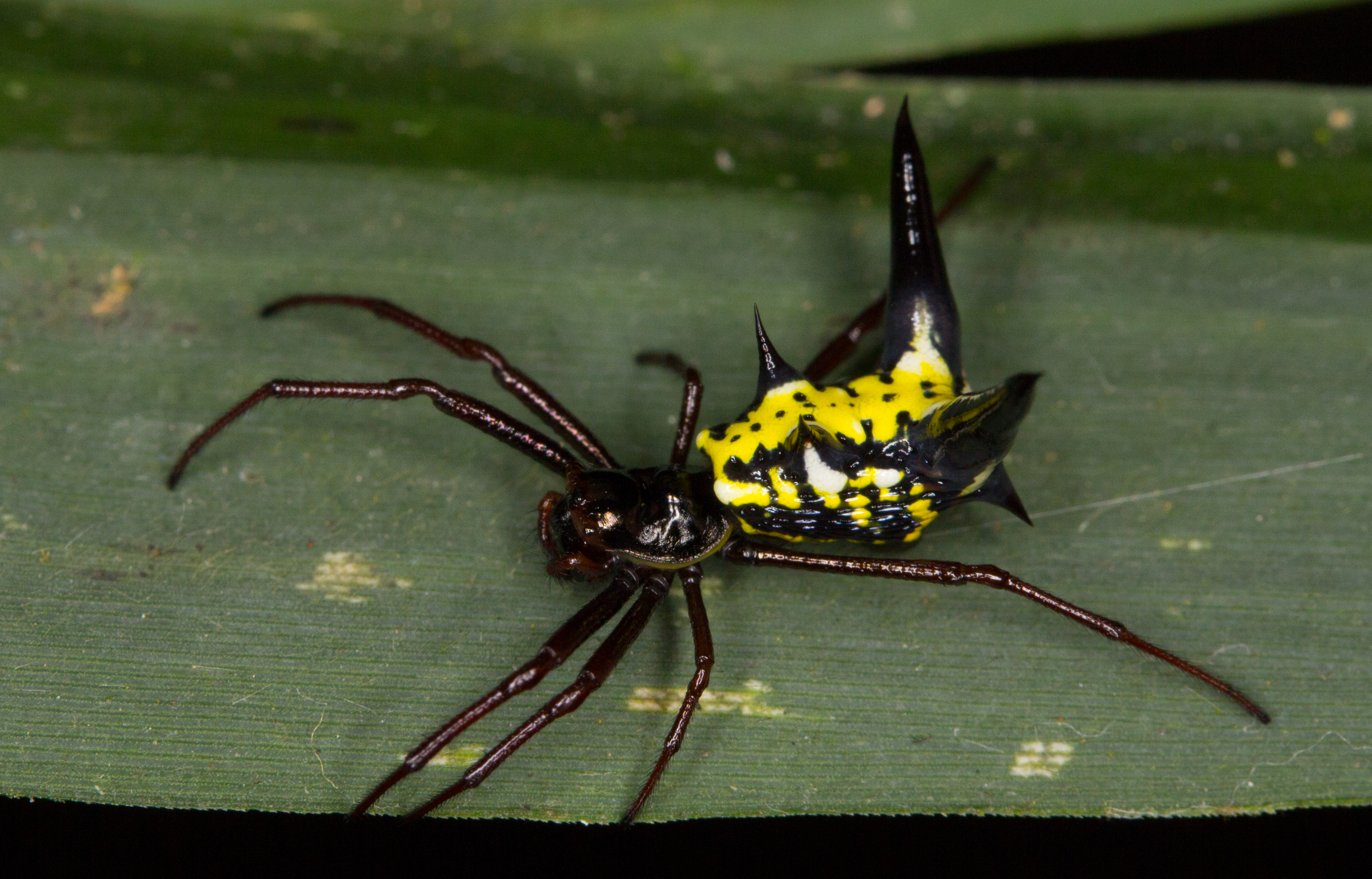
Micrathena vigorsi from Colombia to Brazil

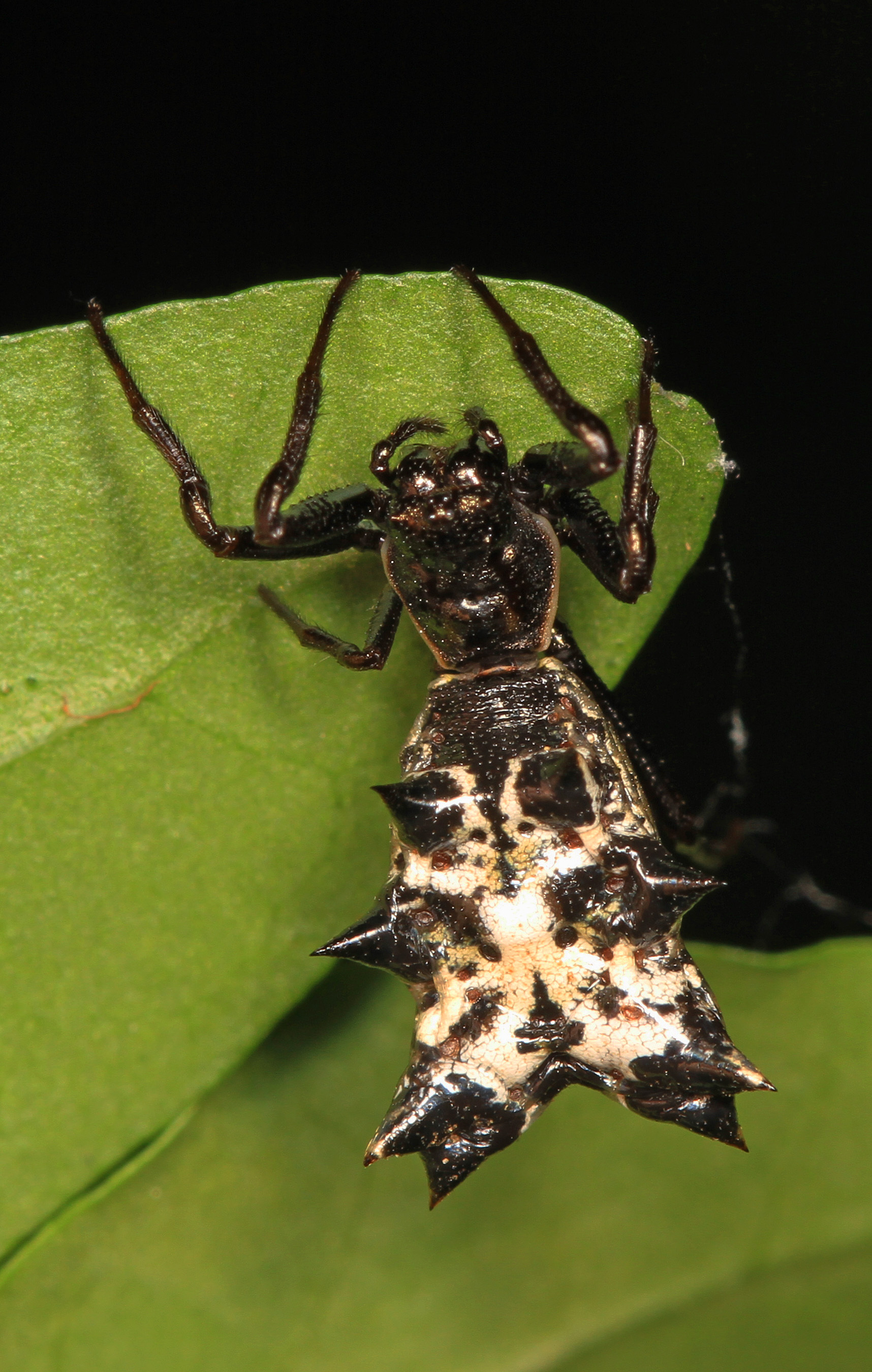
Micrathena gracilis in Virginia, USA

- M. abrahami (Mello-Leitão, 1948) – Colombia to Brazil
- M. acuta (Walckenaer, 1841) – Trinidad to Argentina
- M. agriliformis (Taczanowski, 1879) – Costa Rica to Bolivia
- M. alvarengai Levi, 1985 – Brazil
- M. anchicaya Levi, 1985 – Colombia, Ecuador
- M. annulata Reimoser, 1917 – Colombia, Brazil, Paraguay, Argentina
- M. armigera (C. L. Koch, 1837) – Brazil, Peru, Guyana
- M. atuncela Levi, 1985 – Colombia
- M. aureola (C. L. Koch, 1836) – Colombia to Suriname, Paraguay
- M. balzapamba Levi, 1985 – Ecuador
- M. bananal Levi, 1985 – Brazil
- M. bandeirante (Magalhaes & Santos, 2011) – Brazil, Argentina
- M. banksi Levi, 1985 – Cuba
- M. beta Caporiacco, 1947 – Guyana, French Guiana, Brazil, Ecuador, Peru
- M. bicolor (Keyserling, 1864) – Colombia, Peru
- M. bifida (Taczanowski, 1879) – Peru
- M. bimucronata (O. Pickard-Cambridge, 1899) – Mexico to Panama
- M. bogota Levi, 1985 – Colombia
- M. brevipes (O. Pickard-Cambridge, 1890) – Mexico to Panama
- M. brevispina (Keyserling, 1864) – Panama to Argentina
- M. carimagua (Levi, 1985) – Colombia, Venezuela
- M. clypeata (Walckenaer, 1805) – Panama to Peru
- M. coca Levi, 1985 – Colombia to Brazil
- M. cornuta (Taczanowski, 1873) – Colombia to Brazil
- M. coroico Levi, 1985 – Bolivia
- M. crassa (Keyserling, 1864) – Costa Rica to Argentina
- M. crassispina (C. L. Koch, 1836) – Brazil, Bolivia, Paraguay, Argentina
- M. cubana (Banks, 1909) – Cuba
- M. cucharas (Levi, 1985) – Peru
- M. cyanospina (Lucas, 1835) – Colombia to Brazil
- M. decorata Chickering, 1960 – Colombia
- M. digitata (C. L. Koch, 1839) – Brazil
- M. donaldi Chickering, 1961 – Costa Rica to Colombia
- M. duodecimspinosa (O. Pickard-Cambridge, 1890) – Guatemala to Colombia
- M. elongata (Keyserling, 1864) – Colombia
- M. embira Levi, 1985 – Colombia, Brazil
- M. evansi Chickering, 1960 – Panama, Trinidad to Brazil
- M. excavata (C. L. Koch, 1836) – Panama to Brazil
- M. exlinae Levi, 1985 – Peru, Brazil
- M. fidelis (Banks, 1909) – Costa Rica to Argentina
- M. fissispina (C. L. Koch, 1836) – Brazil, French Guiana
- M. flaveola (Perty, 1839) – Costa Rica to Argentina
- M. forcipata (Thorell, 1859) – Mexico, Cuba, Hispaniola
- M. funebris (Marx, 1898) – USA to Costa Rica
- M. furcata (Hahn, 1822) – Brazil, Argentina, Uruguay
- M. furcula (O. Pickard-Cambridge, 1890) – Guatemala to Brazil
- M. furva (Keyserling, 1892) – Brazil, Uruguay, Argentina
- M. gaujoni Simon, 1897 – Ecuador, Colombia
- M. glyptogonoides Levi, 1985 – Mexico
- M. gracilis (Walckenaer, 1805) – North, Central America
- M. guayas Levi, 1985 – Ecuador
- M. guerini (Keyserling, 1864) – Colombia
- M. gurupi Levi, 1985 – Brazil, Suriname
- M. hamifera Simon, 1897 – Ecuador to Brazil
- M. horrida (Taczanowski, 1873) – Greater Antilles, Mexico to Argentina
- M. huanuco Levi, 1985 – Colombia, Peru
- M. jundiai Levi, 1985 – Brazil
- M. kirbyi (Perty, 1833) – Colombia to Brazil
- M. kochalkai Levi, 1985 – Colombia
- M. lata Chickering, 1960 – Brazil, Argentina
- M. lenca Levi, 1985 – Mexico
- M. lepidoptera Mello-Leitão, 1941 – Costa Rica to Colombia
- M. lindenbergi Mello-Leitão, 1940 – Brazil
- M. lucasi (Keyserling, 1864) – Mexico to Brazil
- M. macfarlanei Chickering, 1961 – Panama to Brazil
- M. margerita Levi, 1985 – Mexico
- M. marta Levi, 1985 – Colombia
- M. miles Simon, 1895 – Brazil, Guyana, Peru
- M. militaris (Fabricius, 1775) – Greater Antilles
- M. mitrata (Hentz, 1850) – USA to Brazil
- M. molesta Chickering, 1961 – Nicaragua to Panama
- M. necopinata Chickering, 1960 – Colombia, Peru, Brazil
- M. nigrichelis Strand, 1908 – Brazil, Paraguay, Uruguay, Argentina
- M. osa (Levi, 1985) – Costa Rica
- M. parallela (O. Pickard-Cambridge, 1890) – Costa Rica, Panama
- M. patruelis (C. L. Koch, 1839) – Brazil, Paraguay, Argentina
- M. peregrinatorum (Holmberg, 1883) – Brazil, Argentina
- M. perfida Magalhaes, Martins, Nogueira & Santos, 2017 – Brazil
- M. petrunkevitchi Levi, 1985 – Mexico
- M. pichincha Levi, 1985 – Ecuador
- M. picta (C. L. Koch, 1836) – Guyana to Paraguay
- M. pilaton Levi, 1985 – Ecuador
- M. plana (C. L. Koch, 1836) – Virgin Is. to Argentina
- M. pungens (Walckenaer, 1841) – Colombia to Bolivia
- M. pupa Simon, 1897 – Colombia, Ecuador
- M. quadriserrata F. O. Pickard-Cambridge, 1904 – Mexico to Venezuela
- M. raimondi (Taczanowski, 1879) – Peru, Ecuador
- M. reali Levi, 1985 – Brazil
- M. reimoseri Mello-Leitão, 1935 – Brazil
- M. rubicundula (Keyserling, 1864) – Colombia, Ecuador
- M. rufopunctata (Butler, 1873) – Jamaica
- M. ruschii (Mello-Leitão, 1945) – Brazil
- M. saccata (C. L. Koch, 1836) – Honduras to Brazil
- M. sagittata (Walckenaer, 1841) – North, Central America
- M. sanctispiritus Brignoli, 1983 – Brazil, Argentina
- M. schenkeli Mello-Leitão, 1939 – Trinidad to Paraguay
- M. schreibersi (Perty, 1833) – Nicaragua to Brazil
- M. sexspinosa (Hahn, 1822) – Mexico to Brazil
- M. shealsi Chickering, 1960 – Argentina
- M. similis Bryant, 1945 – Hispaniola
- M. soaresi Levi, 1985 – Brazil
- M. spinosa (Linnaeus, 1758) – Suriname, French Guiana, Brazil
- M. spinulata F. O. Pickard-Cambridge, 1904 – Mexico
- M. spitzi Mello-Leitão, 1932 – Brazil, Argentina
- M. striata F. O. Pickard-Cambridge, 1904 – Mexico, Guatemala
- M. stuebeli (Karsch, 1887) – Colombia, Ecuador
- M. swainsoni (Perty, 1833) – Brazil, Paraguay, Argentina
- M. teresopolis Levi, 1985 – Brazil
- M. triangularis (C. L. Koch, 1836) – Trinidad to Brazil
- M. triangularispinosa (De Geer, 1778) – Trinidad to Bolivia
- M. triserrata F. O. Pickard-Cambridge, 1904 – Mexico to Belize
- M. tziscao Levi, 1985 – Mexico
- M. ucayali Levi, 1985 – Peru, Brazil
- M. vigorsi (Perty, 1833) – Colombia to Brazil
- M. woytkowskii (Levi, 1985) – Colombia, Peru
- M. yanomami Magalhaes & Santos, 2011 – French Guiana, Brazil, Peru
- M. zilchi Kraus, 1955 – Mexico to El Salvador

== In North America ==
Although the genus includes over a hundred species, only four are found in the United States and Canada. Among those four species, female spined micrathena (Micrathena gracilis) have five pairs of conical tubercles, female M. mitrata have two short posterior pairs, and female arrow-shaped micrathena (M. sagittata) have three pairs. Only two species are recorded from Canada, being M. sagittata, found primarily in the Pinery Provincial Park, and M. gracilis, which is more widespread.
