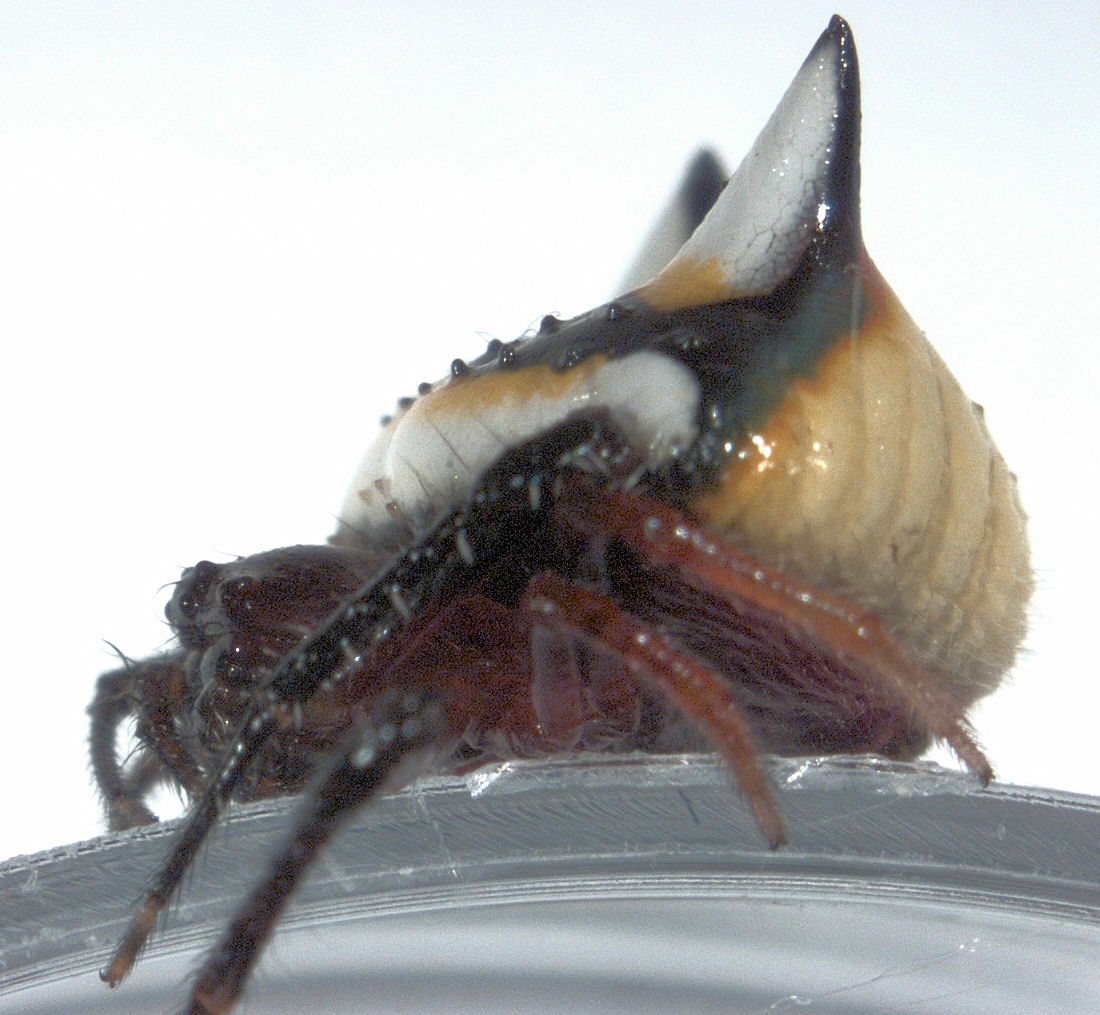
- Two spined spider (Poecilopachys australasia) from New Zealand

Scientific classification
- Kingdom: Animalia
- Phylum: Arthropoda
- Subphylum: Chelicerata
- Class: Arachnida
- Order: Araneae
- Infraorder: Araneomorphae
- Family: Araneidae
- Subfamily: Cyrtarachninae s.l.
- Genus: Poecilopachys; Simon, 1895

Type species
- P. australasia (Griffith & Pidgeon, 1833)

Species
- 5, see text

= Poecilopachys =

Genus of spiders

Poecilopachys is a genus of Australasian orb-weaver spiders first described by Eugène Simon in 1895.

== Species ==
As of April 2019 it contains five species:

- Poecilopachys australasia (Griffith & Pidgeon, 1833) (type) – Australia (Queensland, New South Wales), Samoa
- Poecilopachys jenningsi (Rainbow, 1899) – Vanuatu
- Poecilopachys minutissima Chrysanthus, 1971 – Papua New Guinea (New Ireland)
- Poecilopachys speciosa (L. Koch, 1872) – Australia (Queensland)
- Poecilopachys verrucosa (L. Koch, 1871) – New Guinea, Australia (Queensland), Samoa
