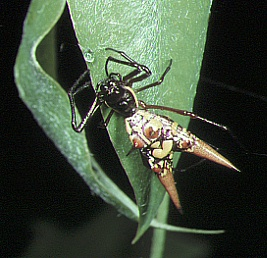
- female from Costa Rica

Scientific classification
- Kingdom: Animalia
- Phylum: Arthropoda
- Subphylum: Chelicerata
- Class: Arachnida
- Order: Araneae
- Infraorder: Araneomorphae
- Family: Araneidae
- Genus: Micrathena
- Species: M. sexspinosa

Binomial name
- Micrathena sexspinosa (Hahn, 1822)

Synonyms
- Epeira sexspinosa Hahn, 1822; Acrosoma sexspinosa (Hahn, 1822); Plectana squamosa Walckenaer, 1841; Acrosoma obtusospinum Keyserling, 1864; Acrosoma petersii Taczanowski, 1873; Keyserlingia cornigera O. Pickard-Cambridge, 1890; Acrosoma calcaratum O. Pickard-Cambridge, 1890; Micrathena obtusospina (Keyserling, 1864); Micrathena cornigera (O. Pickard-Cambridge, 1890); Micrathena petersi (Taczanowski, 1873)

= Micrathena sexspinosa =

Species of spider

Micrathena sexspinosa is a species of orb-weaver spider in the family Araneidae. It is found from Mexico to Brazil.

== Etymology ==
The species name sexspinosa derives from Latin sex meaning "six" and spinosa meaning "spiny" or "thorny", referring to the characteristic six abdominal spines that distinguish this species.

== Description ==
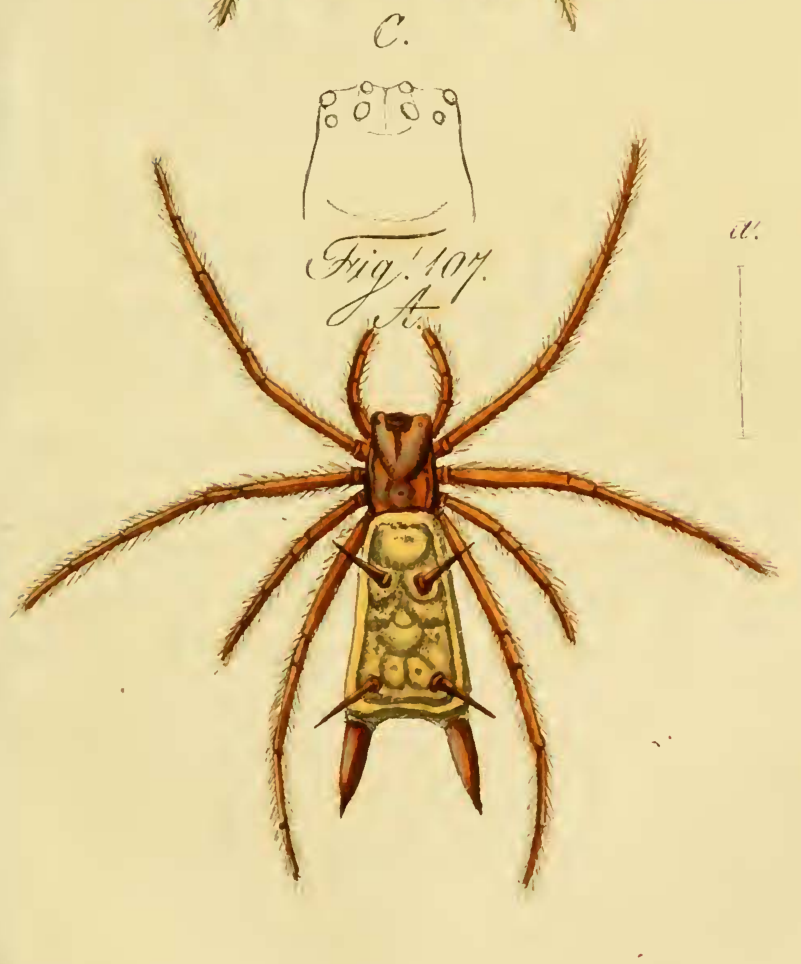
drawing of female by Hahn (1834)

As with related species, M. sexspinosa shows considerable sexual dimorphism.

Females are much larger than males, with total body lengths ranging from 7.7 to 11.8 mm, while males measure only 4.5 to 5.2 mm.The females have a distinctive abdomen with two pairs of slender dorsal spines, rarely with a smaller spine between them. The carapace measures 3.8 mm long and 2.7 mm wide in females.

Males can be distinguished from other Micrathena species by their unique long, tubular paracymbium (a spur-like structure), which separates them from all other species in the genus. The male abdomen is trapezoidal with two posterolateral lobes, and the total length is approximately 5.2 mm with a carapace measuring 2.1 mm long and 1.9 mm wide.

Both sexes show extreme variability in spine and fork development, often resembling the spination patterns of other endemic species within their geographic regions.

== Distribution ==
M. sexspinosa has a broad distribution range extending from Mexico through Central America to Brazil, including records from Colombia, Panama, Costa Rica, Nicaragua, Honduras, Guatemala, French Guiana, Suriname, Guyana, and Venezuela. In Brazil, it has been recorded from the states of Pará and Ceará.

== Habitat ==
This species has been collected from various forest habitats including "pine forest" in Chiapas, "forest trail" in Colombia, and "low vegetation" in primary forest areas of Costa Rica. The orange eggs are in a pale yellow egg-sac.

== Taxonomy ==
The species was first described by Carl Wilhelm Hahn in 1822 as Epeira sexspinosa. The taxonomic history of this species is complex, with numerous synonyms reflecting the high morphological variability that led early taxonomists to describe what are now recognized as the same species under different names.

Major taxonomic revisions were conducted by Alexander Petrunkevitch in 1911 and 1917, and later by Arthur M. Chickering in 1961, who synonymized several species. The most comprehensive revision was performed by Herbert Walter Levi in 1985, who established the current taxonomic understanding and synonymized additional species including Micrathena petersi.
