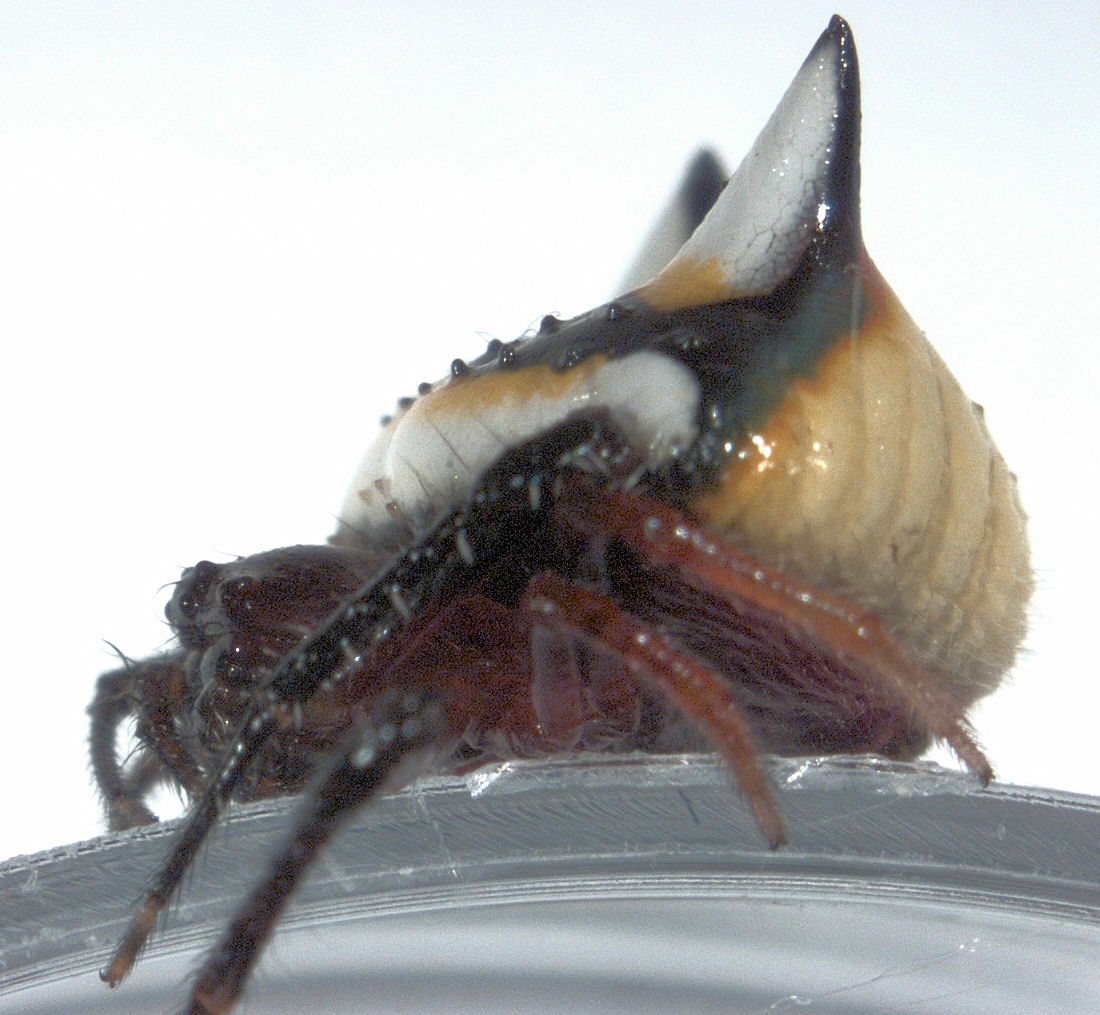
- Adult female

Scientific classification
- Domain: Eukaryota
- Kingdom: Animalia
- Phylum: Arthropoda
- Subphylum: Chelicerata
- Class: Arachnida
- Order: Araneae
- Infraorder: Araneomorphae
- Family: Araneidae
- Genus: Poecilopachys
- Species: P. australasia

Binomial name
- Poecilopachys australasia (Griffith & Pidgeon, 1833)

= Poecilopachys australasia =

Two-spined spider

Species of spider

Poecilopachys australasia, commonly known as the two-spined spider, is an Australian orb-weaving spider which has also been recorded in New Zealand since the early 1970s. The spider is nocturnal, spinning a cart-wheel-shaped web at night which it consumes in the morning. Females can be commonly found on the undersides of citrus tree leaves during the day.

== Distribution ==
Two-spined spiders are native to Australia, and were first noted in Auckland, New Zealand, in 1971. Since their introduction to New Zealand, the spiders have spread south; they are now common in the northern half of the South Island, and have been found as far south as Christchurch.

== Description ==
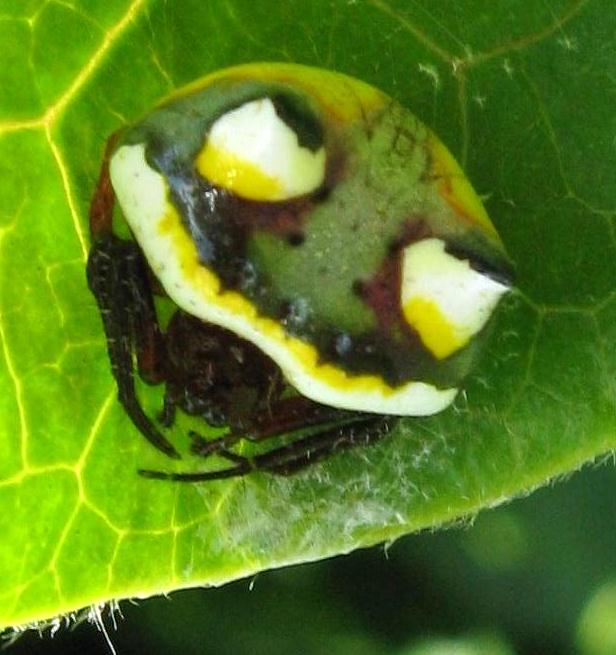
Mature female Poecilopachys australasia, photographed in New Zealand.

Females are about 8 mm in length and brightly coloured: the upper surface of the abdomen is yellow and olive with two white horn-like 'spines' that give this spider its common name. The front of the abdomen has a broad band of cream and yellow, and the rear has an upward pointing chevron marking against a red/yellow background.

Adult males are much smaller (2.5–3 mm) and more difficult to find. They lack the horns and the bright colours of an adult female, and at first were thought to be a different species and named Cyrtarachne setosa.

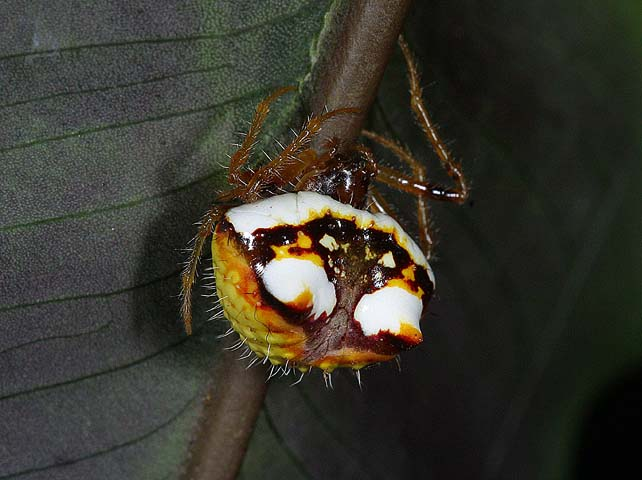
Poecilopachys australasia. Large body hairs on an adult female gradually disappear as she approaches maturity.

== Breeding behaviour ==
In an Auckland garden, four males were observed gathering around the female while the female stroked one, which was directly in front of her, with her legs. However no actual transfer of sperm was observed.

Females can be found guarding a small, papery, brown, spindle-shaped egg sac.
