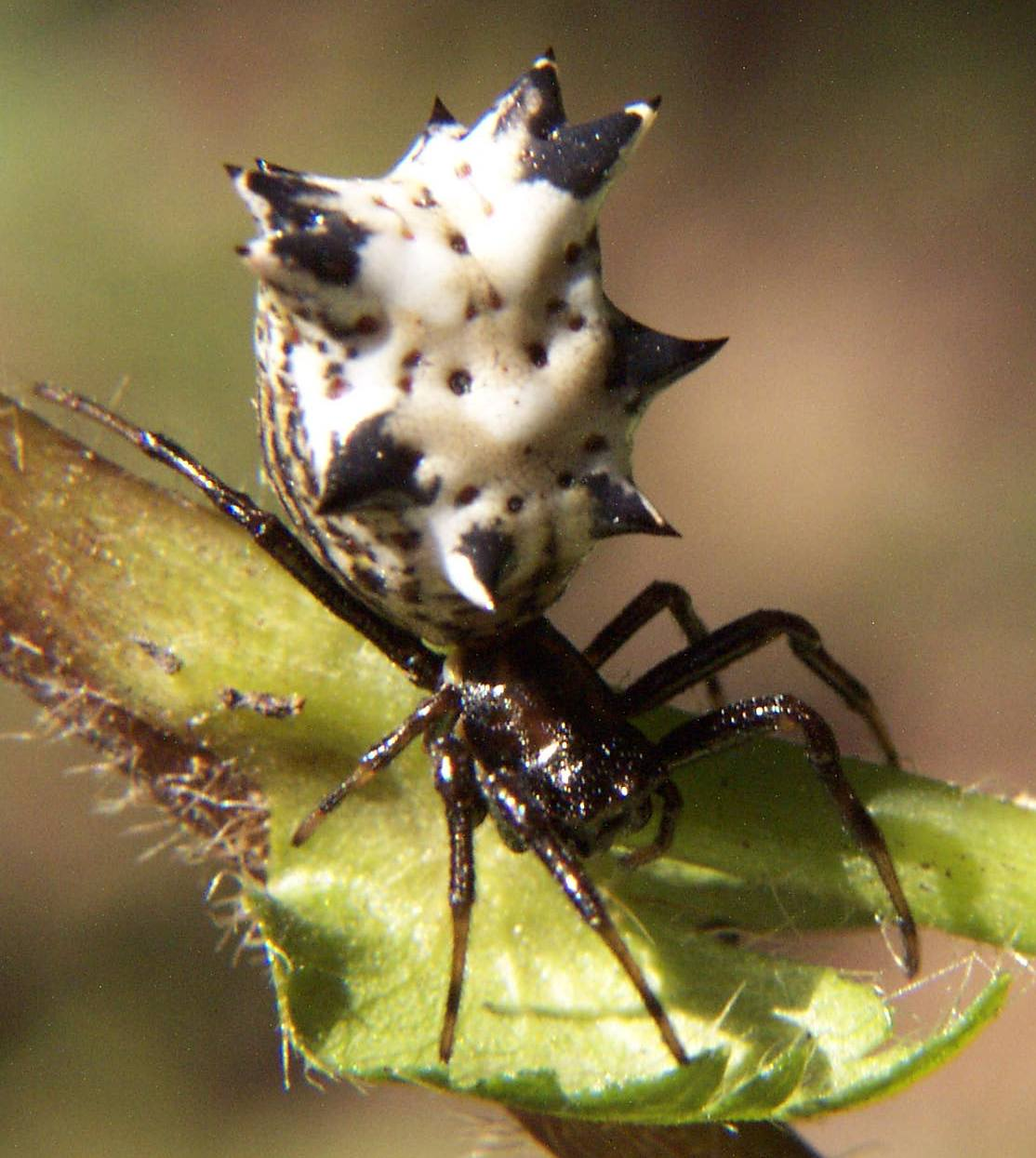

Scientific classification
- Kingdom: Animalia
- Phylum: Arthropoda
- Subphylum: Chelicerata
- Class: Arachnida
- Order: Araneae
- Infraorder: Araneomorphae
- Family: Araneidae
- Genus: Micrathena
- Species: M. gracilis

Binomial name
- Micrathena gracilis (Walckenaer, 1805)

Synonyms
- Acrosoma gracile (Walckenaer, 1805); Acrosoma matronale C. L. Koch, 1844; Acrosoma reduvianum (Walckenaer, 1841); Acrosoma rugosum (Hentz, 1850); Epeira gracilis Walckenaer, 1805; Epeira rugosa Hentz, 1850; Micrathena gracilis (Walckenaer, 1805); Micrathena matronalis (C. L. Koch, 1844); Micrathena nigrior Chamberlin & Ivie, 1936; Micrathena reduviana (Walckenaer, 1841); Micrathena sexacantha Franganillo, 1930; Plectana gracilis (Walckenaer, 1805); Plectana reduviana Walckenaer, 1841

= Spined micrathena =

Species of spider

Micrathena gracilis is a spider in the family Araneidae (orb-weavers), commonly known as the spined micrathena or castleback orbweaver. This spider spins a moderately large (can be about 20 cm long in diameter) and very tightly coiled web. The spiders themselves are small and can be found to be anywhere from 4.2 mm to 10.8 mm long. Its venom is harmless to humans. M. gracilis is unique in appearance due to its large spiky abdomen and black and white bodies. Certain spiders of this species can also display a yellow color on the sides of their bodies. These spiders can be seen most active during the end of the summer and beginning of fall. M. gracilis is diurnal and are rarely ever seen active at night.

== Physical characteristics ==
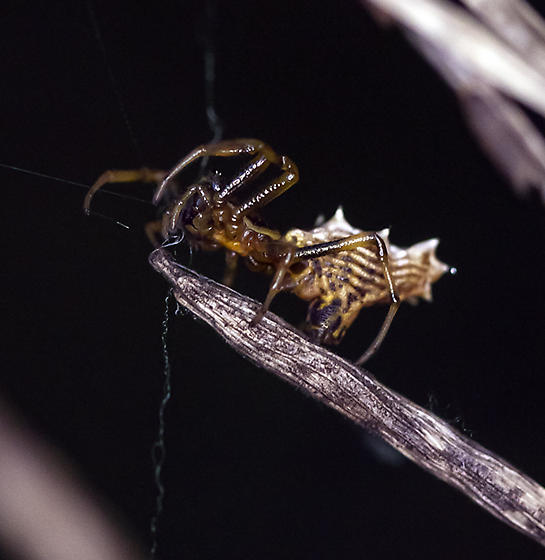
Color variant

Females are 8–10 mm long. They exhibit a bulbous abdomen with spines. Males exhibit a fair amount of sexual dimorphism. They tend to be a fraction of the size of the females. Also, they have fewer spines, a flatter abdomen, and a slightly lighter tone. Although males can produce silk, they mostly use it in the mating ritual.

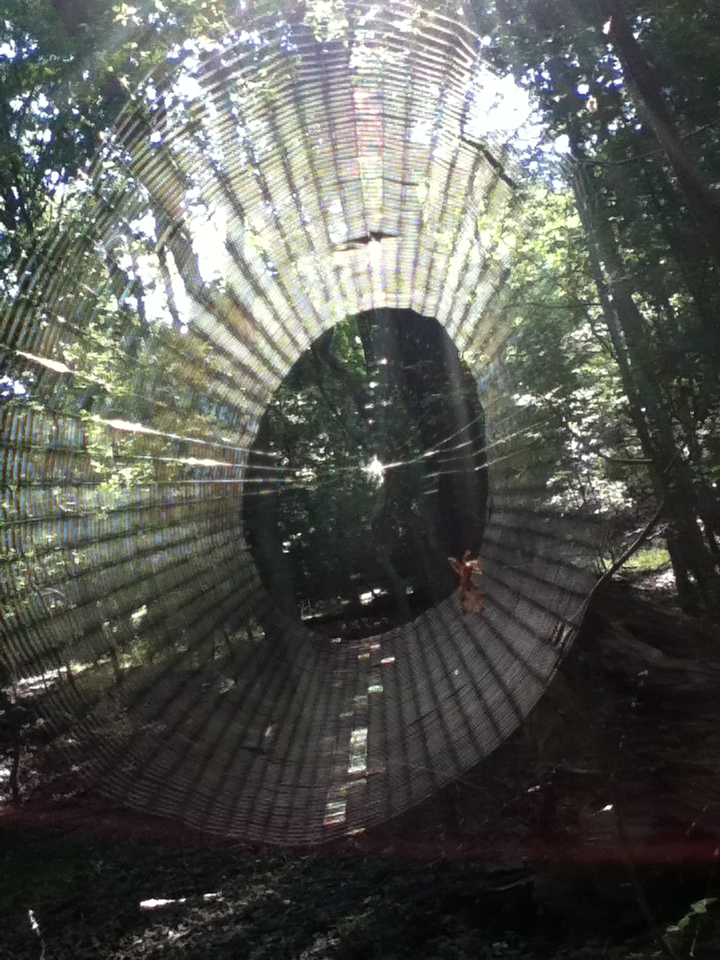
The central portion of a web

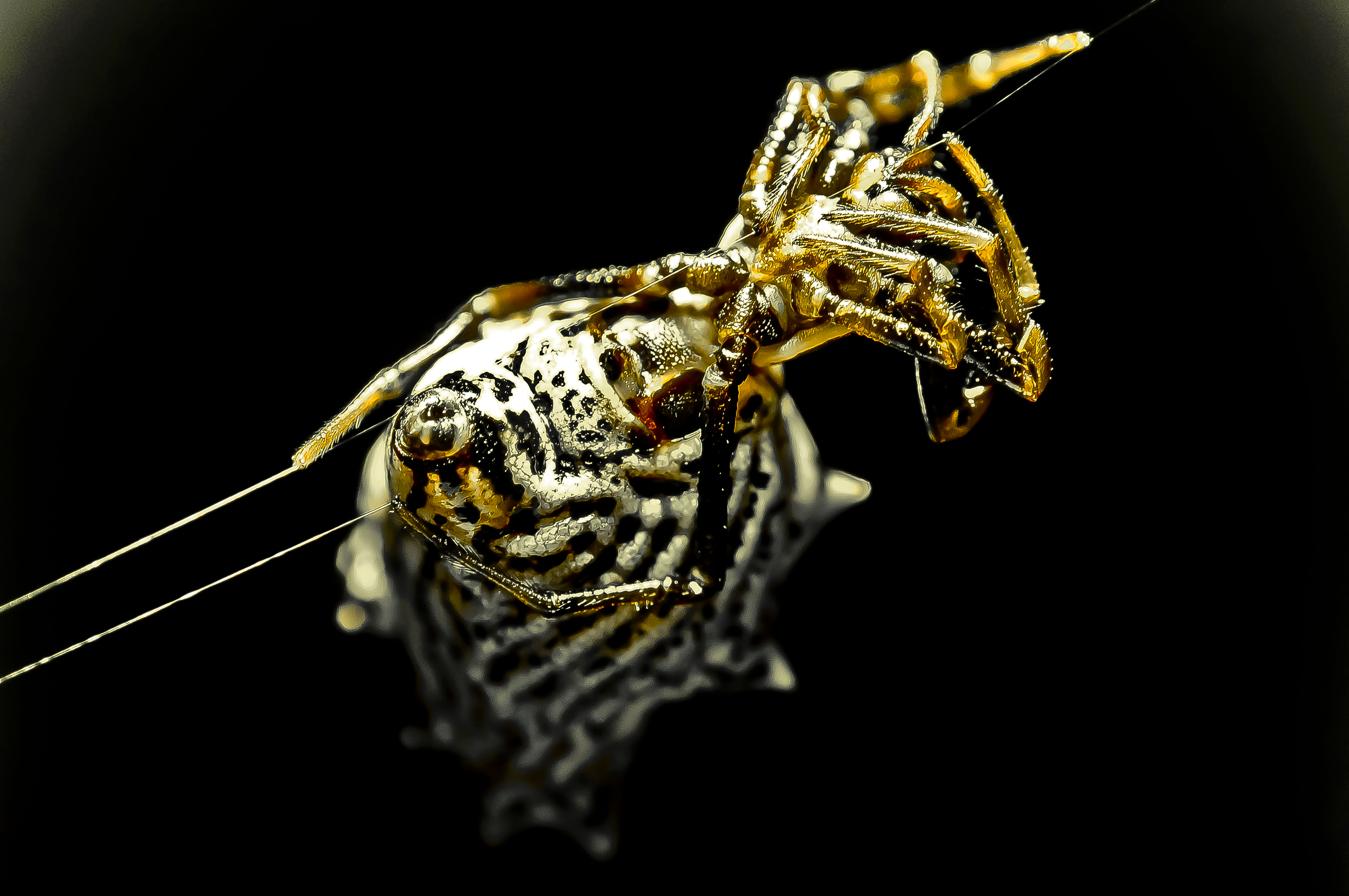
View from underneath

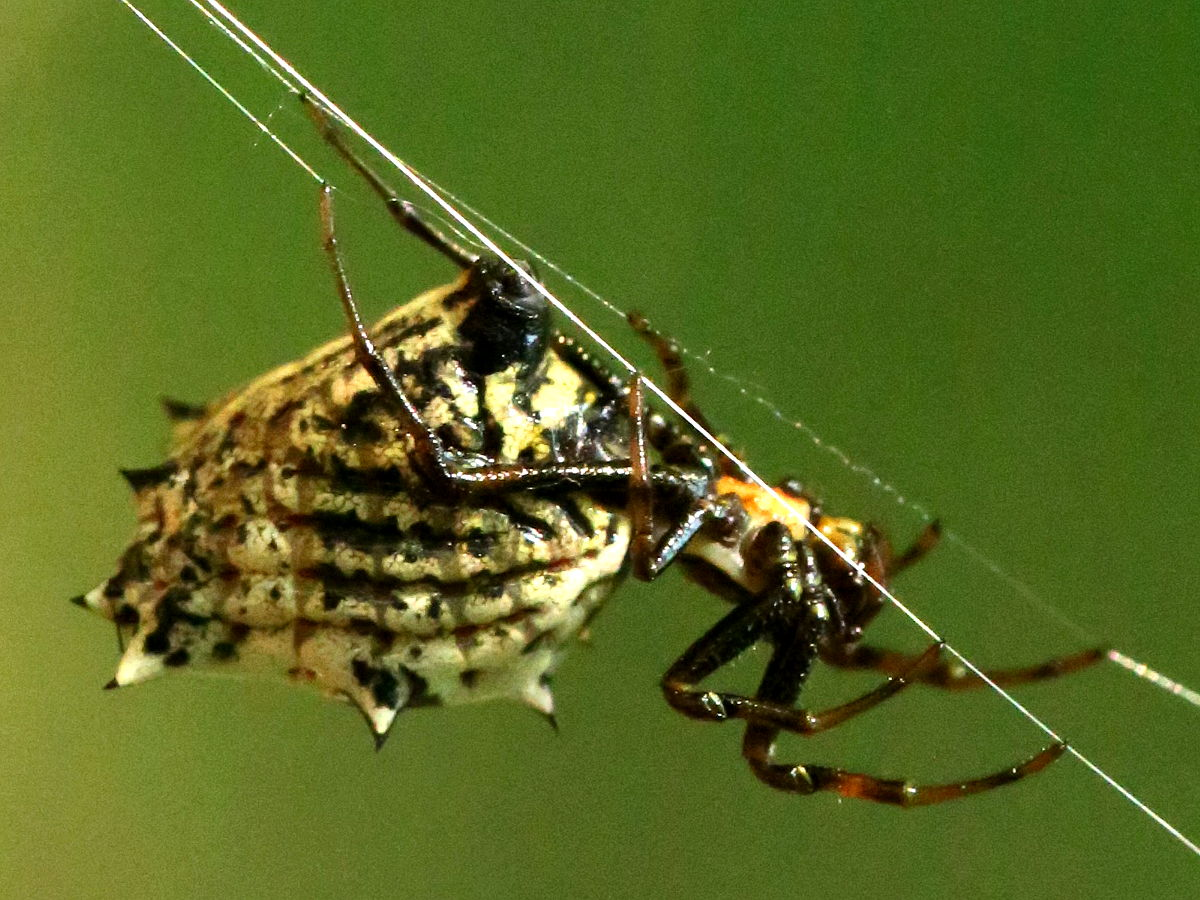
Female lateral view

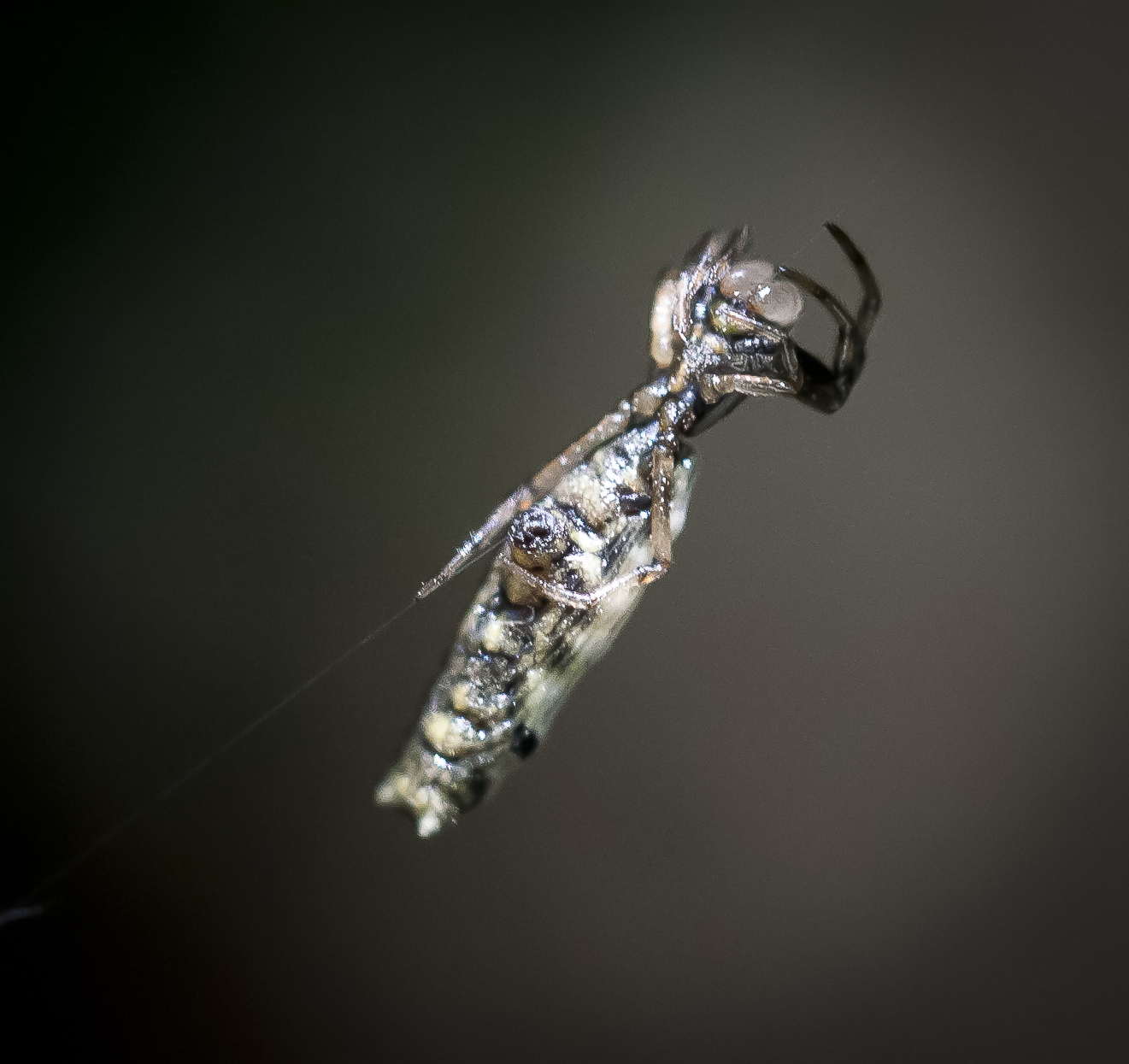
Juvenile male anterior

== Webs ==
When constructing webs, the inner orbs of their webs are changed every night; however, they may keep the outer layer of the web the same for multiple days.

== Distribution and habitat ==
Micrathena gracilis is native to North and Central America. These spiders tend to wander and rarely ever remain in the same web site for more than week. On average, they spend about 6–7 days on each web site. They are neotropical forest spiders and can be found more easily in hardwood forests that contain oak and hickory trees. They tend to like moisture; they are more easily found in woodland forests that are near a lagoon, pond, or other small bodies of water. One study mentioned that these spiders were found in an area that tends to flood during their mating season. M. gracilis may also coexist within and along the edges of colonies of Metepeira incrassata, also known as the colonial orb-weaving spider. They prey on the skimming bluet and are in turn eaten by white-eyed vireos.

== Life cycle ==
Micrathena gracilis hatches in the spring, the image of an adult. After the summer's growth, the female lays eggs in a sac. These remain relatively dormant through the winter months. The general life span is one year in length.
