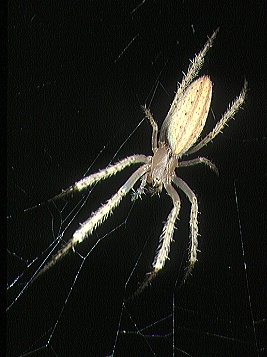
- Female L. fusiformis from Okinawa
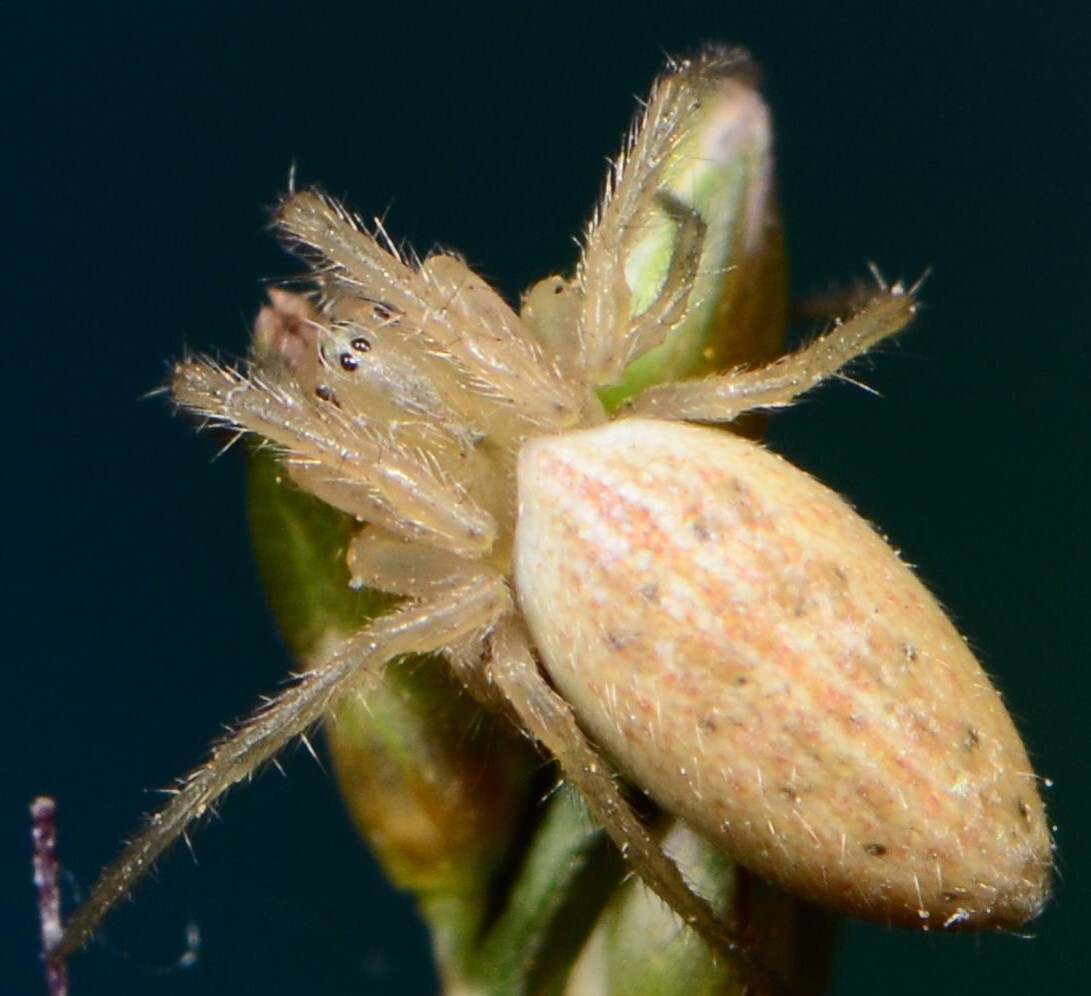
- Female L. longissima from South Africa

Scientific classification
- Kingdom: Animalia
- Phylum: Arthropoda
- Subphylum: Chelicerata
- Class: Arachnida
- Order: Araneae
- Infraorder: Araneomorphae
- Family: Araneidae
- Genus: Lipocrea; Thorell, 1878

Type species
- L. fusiformis (Thorell, 1877)

Species
- 5, see text

= Lipocrea =

Genus of spiders

Lipocrea is a genus of orb-weaver spiders first described by Tamerlan Thorell in 1878.

As of January 2026, it was synonymized with the genus Larinia.

== Description ==
Female and male spiders measure 7-8 mm in total length. These spiders have straw-coloured bodies and legs. The carapace is elongate pear-shaped but narrower in the eye region with an elongate fovea and a narrow longitudinal band dorsally. The abdomen is straw-coloured frequently with paired black spots, oval and elongate with a narrow tip anteriorly and a slight hump above the spinnerets. Their legs are very long and decorated with spots and setae, same color as body, and bear setae with dark spots at their bases.

== Species ==
As of September 2025, this genus includes five species:

- Lipocrea diluta Thorell, 1887 – Myanmar, Indonesia
- Lipocrea epeiroides (O. Pickard-Cambridge, 1872) – Spain, Italy (Sardinia, Sicily), Malta, Cyprus, Turkey, Israel, Yemen, India
- Lipocrea fusiformis (Thorell, 1877) – India, Japan, Philippines, Indonesia (Sulawesi) (type species)
- Lipocrea longissima (Simon, 1881) – Central, East, Southern Africa
- Lipocrea phosop (Tanikawa, Into & Petcharad, 2023) – Thailand
