= Paralarinia bartelsi =

Bartels' Grass Orb-Web Spider

Scientific classification
- Kingdom: Animalia
- Phylum: Arthropoda
- Subphylum: Chelicerata
- Class: Arachnida
- Order: Araneae
- Infraorder: Araneomorphae
- Family: Araneidae
- Genus: Paralarinia
- Species: P. bartelsi

Binomial name
- Paralarinia bartelsi (Lessert, 1933)

Synonyms
- Larinia bartelsi Lessert, 1933

Species of spider

Paralarinia bartelsi is a species of spider in the family Araneidae. It is commonly known as Bartels' grass orb-web spider and is endemic to South Africa.

== Distribution ==
Paralarinia bartelsi is a South African endemic originally described by Lessert in 1933 as Larinia bartelsi from Umbilo in KwaZulu-Natal. The species is known from three provinces and occurs in three protected areas, De Hoop Nature Reserve, Isandlwana Nature Reserve and Tsitsikamma National Park, at altitudes ranging from 71 to 1,199 m above sea level.

The species has been recorded from Eastern Cape, KwaZulu-Natal, North West, and Western Cape provinces, including locations such as Jeffreys Bay, Durban, Umbilo, Isandlwana Nature Reserve, Mooinooi, De Hoop Nature Reserve, and Tsitsikamma National Park.

== Habitat and ecology ==
P. bartelsi is an orb-web dweller that constructs typical orb-webs in and between vegetation at night. It has been sampled from the Fynbos, Forest and Savanna biomes.

== Conservation ==
Paralarinia bartelsi is listed as Least Concern by the South African National Biodiversity Institute due to its wide geographic range. The species is protected in three protected areas including De Hoop Nature Reserve and Tsitsikamma National Park. There are no significant threats to the species.

== Taxonomy ==
The species was originally described by Roger de Lessert in 1933 as Larinia bartelsi from Umbilo in KwaZulu-Natal. It was later transferred to the genus Paralarinia by Grasshoff in 1970. The species has been revised by Grasshoff (1970) and is known from both sexes.
