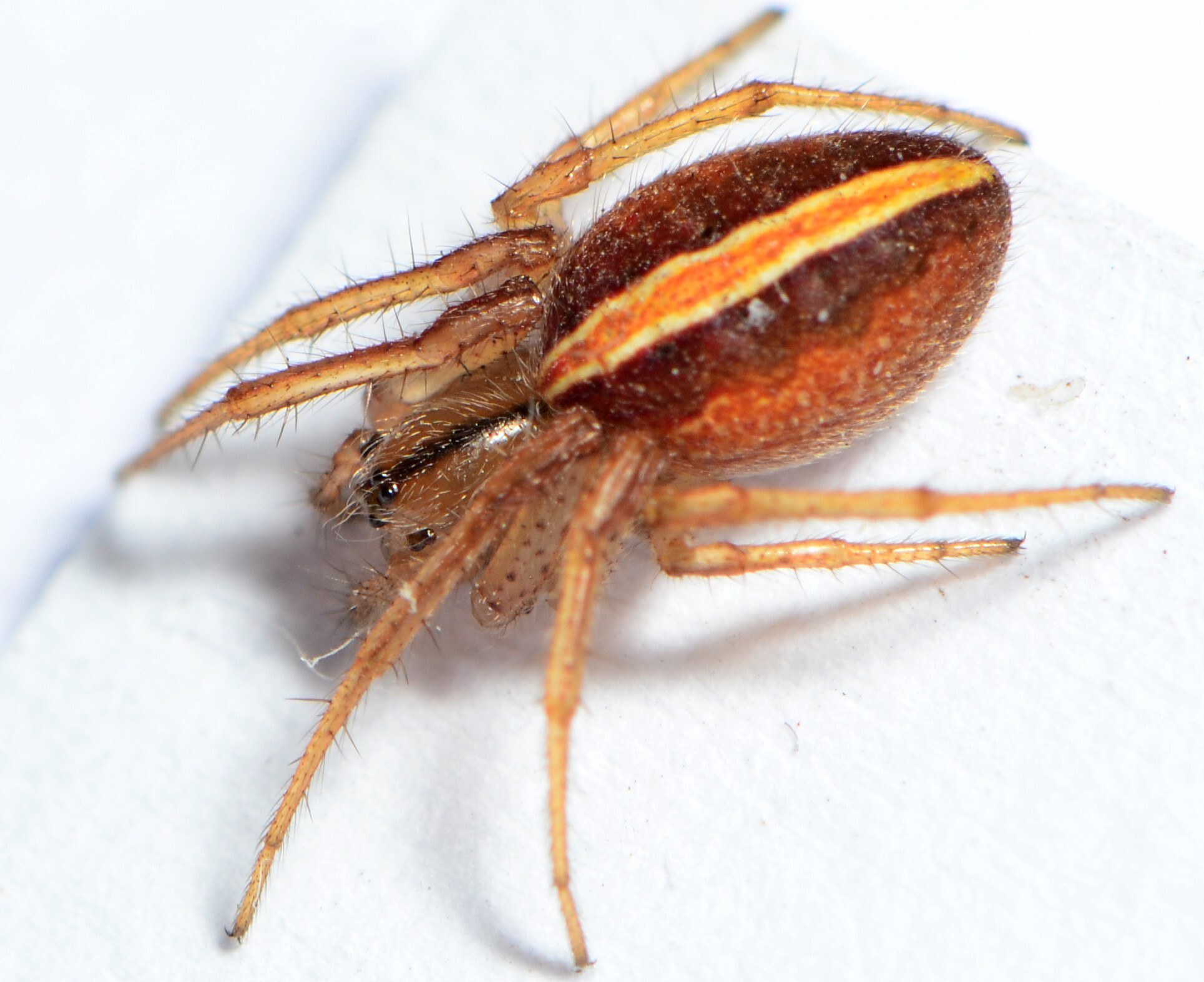
- Female K. decens
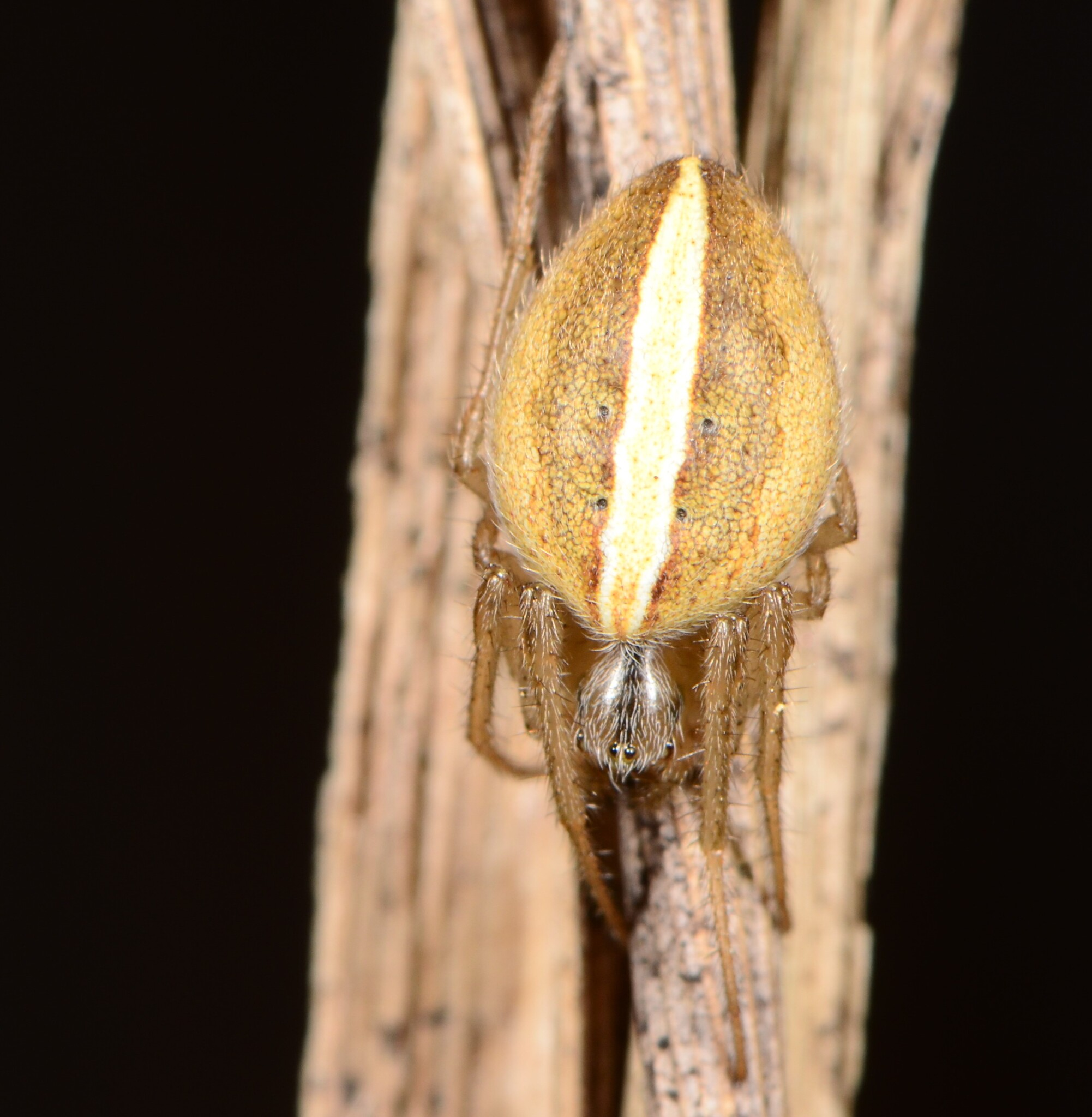
- Female K. decens

Scientific classification
- Kingdom: Animalia
- Phylum: Arthropoda
- Subphylum: Chelicerata
- Class: Arachnida
- Order: Araneae
- Infraorder: Araneomorphae
- Family: Araneidae
- Genus: Kilima; Grasshoff, 1970

Type species
- K. decens (Blackwall, 1866)

Species
- K. conspersa Grasshoff, 1970; K. decens (Blackwall, 1866); K. griseovariegata (Tullgren, 1910)

= Kilima =

Genus of spiders

Kilima is a genus of African orb-weaver spiders first described by M. Grasshoff in 1970. As of November 2026 it contains three species.

== Description ==
Total length of females and males is 7-9 mm. The carapace is elongate with dark median longitudinal band. The abdomen has a narrow orange band bordered by a thin band that varies from white to brown followed by a broader dark brown band with scalloped edge. The legs are similar to the carapace in colour. The genus resembles the grassland species Neoscona moreli, but in this genus the abdominal longitudinal bands are in almost a straight line.

== Species ==
As of November 2026, this genus includes three species:

- Kilima conspersa Grasshoff, 1970 – DR Congo
- Kilima decens (Blackwall, 1866) – Central, East, Southern Africa, Seychelles (type species)
- Kilima griseovariegata (Tullgren, 1910) – Central, East Africa, Yemen
