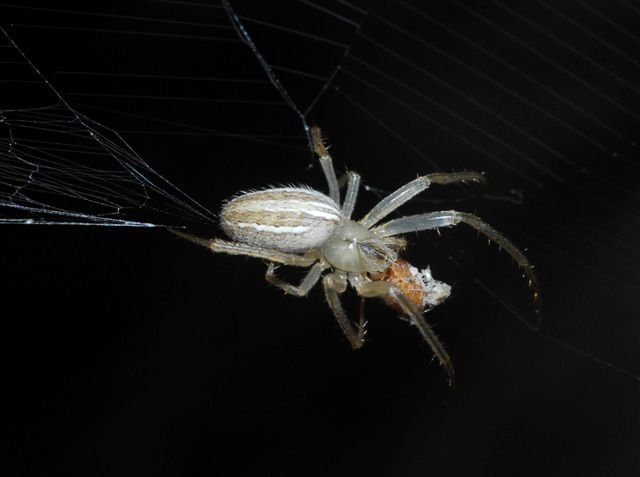
- Female
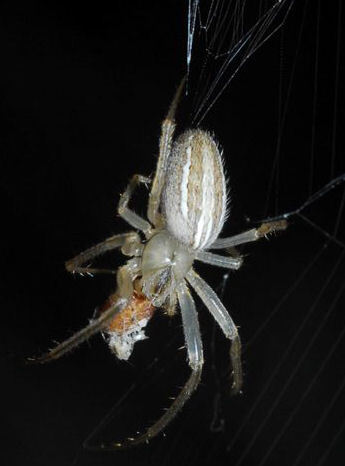
- Female

Scientific classification
- Kingdom: Animalia
- Phylum: Arthropoda
- Subphylum: Chelicerata
- Class: Arachnida
- Order: Araneae
- Infraorder: Araneomorphae
- Family: Araneidae
- Genus: Larinia
- Species: L. chloris

Binomial name
- Larinia chloris (Audouin, 1826)

Synonyms
- Larinia flavescens Simon, 1882

= Larinia chloris =

Larinia Grass Orb-Web Spider

Species of spider

Larinia chloris is a species of spider in the family Araneidae. It has a wide distribution across Africa and western Asia and is commonly known as the Larinia grass orb-web spider.

== Distribution ==
Larinia chloris has a wide distribution from Spain, Greece, Cyprus, Turkey, North and East Africa to Israel, Iraq, Iran, India, Sri Lanka, and Bangladesh. The species has been introduced to Mozambique and South Africa.

In South Africa, the species is known from Eastern Cape, Limpopo, Mpumalanga, Western Cape, and Northern Cape. Notable locations include Addo Elephant National Park, De Hoop Nature Reserve, Swartberg Nature Reserve, and Tswalu Kalahari Reserve.

== Habitat and ecology ==
Larinia chloris is an orb-web spider that constructs their webs in the grass.

The species inhabits Thicket, Fynbos, Savanna, and Grassland biomes at altitudes ranging from 4 to 1,909 m above sea level.

== Conservation ==
Larinia chloris is listed as Least Concern by the South African National Biodiversity Institute due to its wide geographical range. There are no known threats to the species. The species is protected in five reserves including Swartberg Nature Reserve and Tswalu Kalahari Reserve.

== Taxonomy ==
Larinia chloris was originally described by Victor Audouin in 1826 as Epeira chloris. The species was revised by Manfred Grasshoff in 1970, who synonymized Larinia flavescens Simon, 1882 with this species. It is known from both sexes.
