= Larinia elegans =

Scientific classification
- Kingdom: Animalia
- Phylum: Arthropoda
- Subphylum: Chelicerata
- Class: Arachnida
- Order: Araneae
- Infraorder: Araneomorphae
- Family: Araneidae
- Genus: Larinia
- Species: L. elegans

Binomial name
- Larinia elegans Spassky, 1939

Synonyms
- Singa phragmiteti Nemenz, 1956

Species of spider

Larinia elegans is an orb-weaving spider species found from Austria to China.
