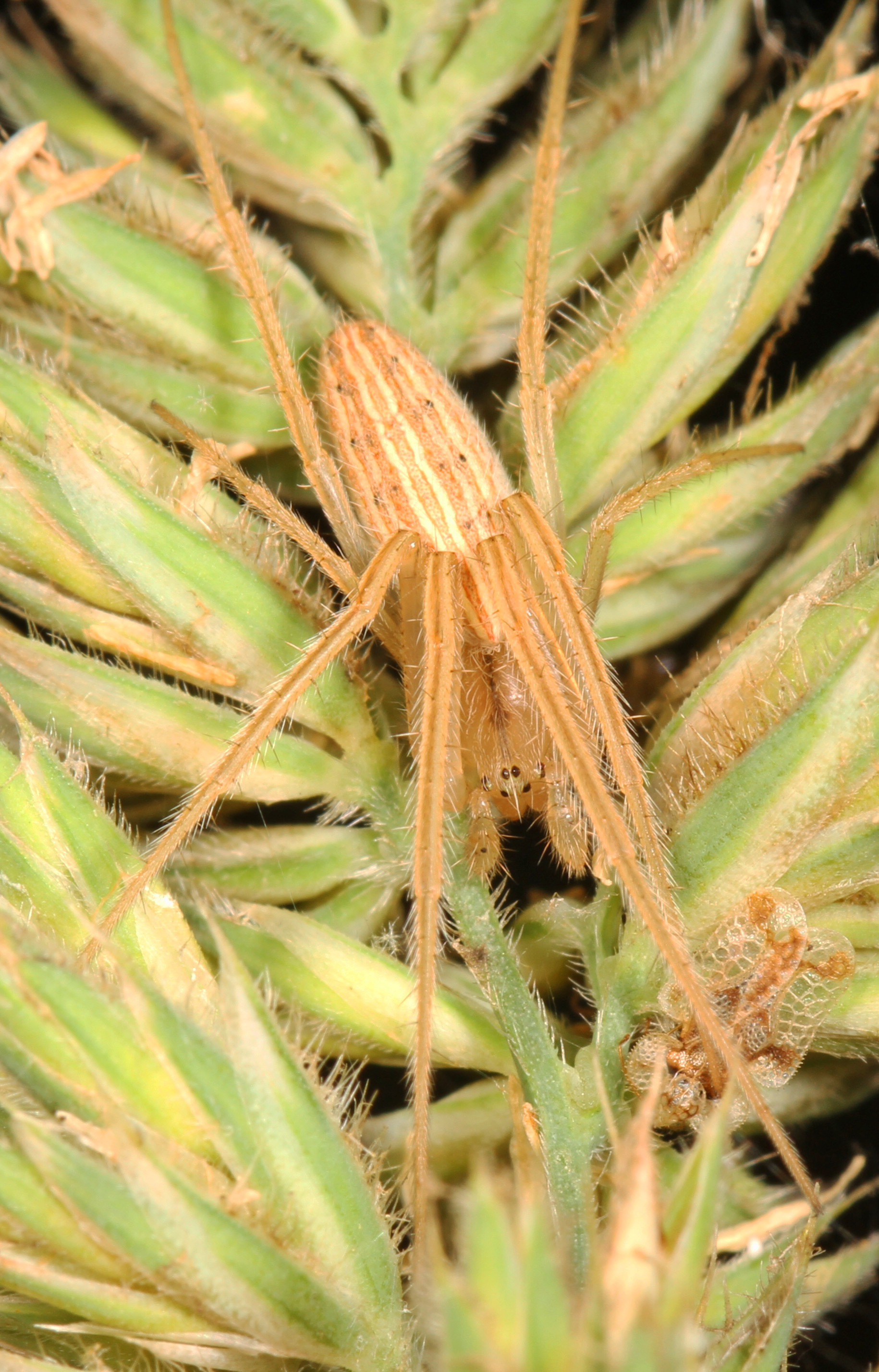

Scientific classification
- Kingdom: Animalia
- Phylum: Arthropoda
- Subphylum: Chelicerata
- Class: Arachnida
- Order: Araneae
- Infraorder: Araneomorphae
- Family: Araneidae
- Genus: Larinia
- Species: L. directa

Binomial name
- Larinia directa (Hentz, 1847)

= Larinia directa =

Species of spider

Larinia directa is a species of orb weaver in the spider family Araneidae. It is found in a range from the United States to Brazil.

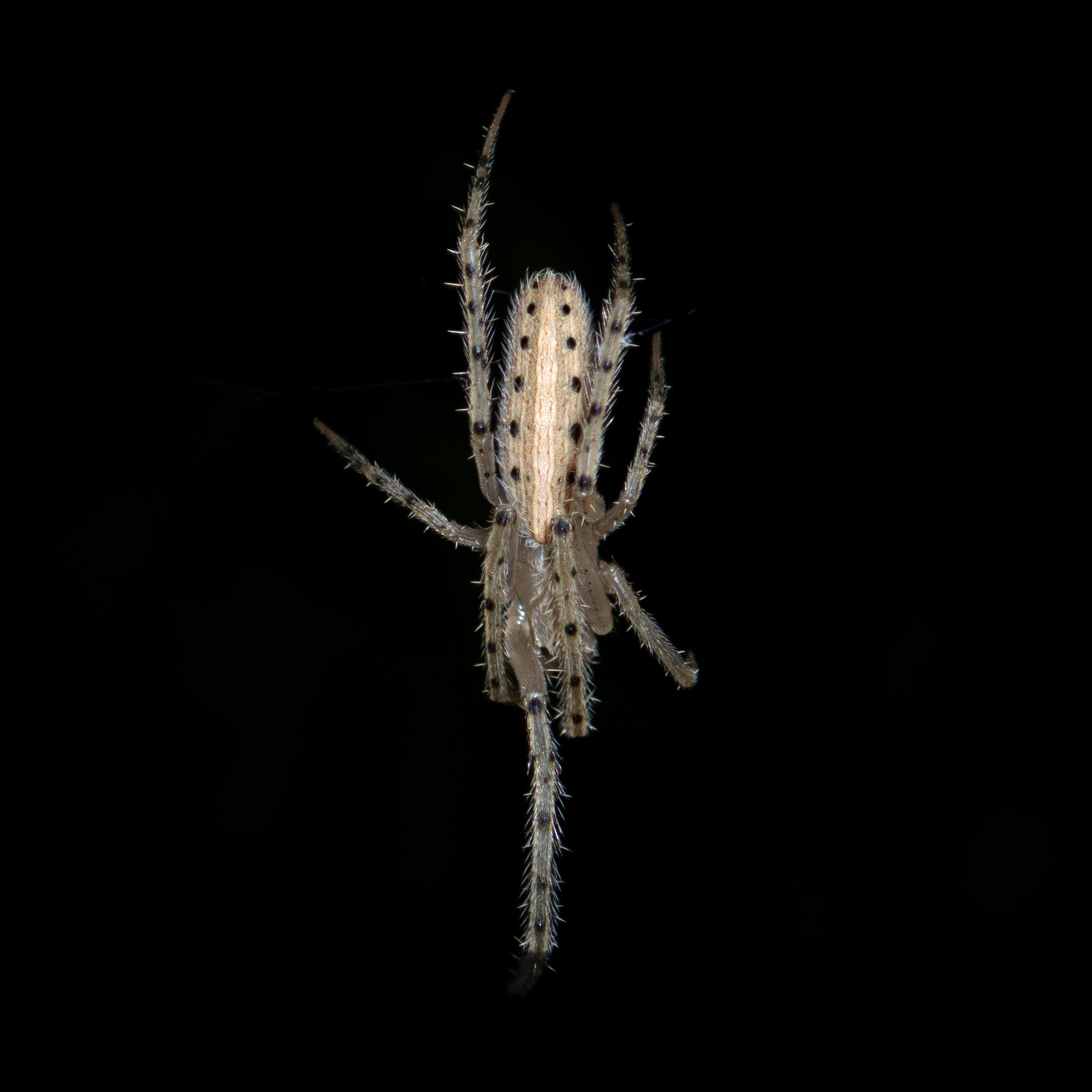
Louisiana Specimen

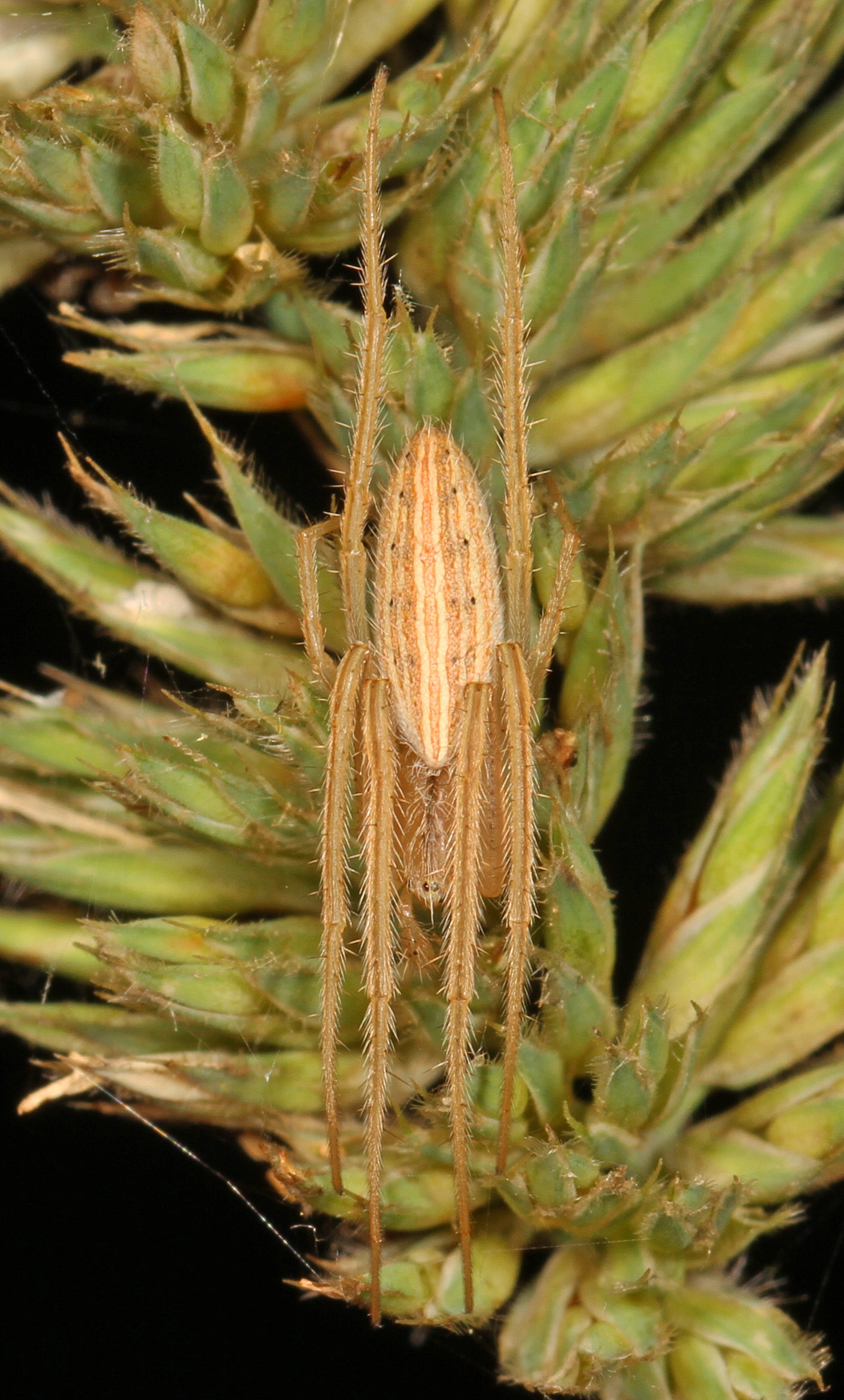
