= Paralarinia =

Scientific classification
- Kingdom: Animalia
- Phylum: Arthropoda
- Subphylum: Chelicerata
- Class: Arachnida
- Order: Araneae
- Infraorder: Araneomorphae
- Family: Araneidae
- Genus: Paralarinia; Grasshoff, 1970

Type species
- P. denisi (Lessert, 1938)

Species
- 4, see text

Genus of spiders

Paralarinia is a genus of African orb-weaver spiders first described by M. Grasshoff in 1970.

== Description ==
Manfred Grasshoff provided very little information on the genus morphology, with only information on the genitalia available. Based on Lessert's (1933) description for P. bartelsi, the genus is characterized by a yellow-brown cephalothorax with an almost entirely dark cephalic region.

The eyes are located on black spots. The brown sternum is adorned with blackish marginal spots. The legs are brown mottled and banded with brown-black coloration, featuring a wide ring at the end of the anterior femora and all protarsi.

The abdomen is greyish yellow and adorned with a distinct folium with scalloped edges and a finely white border. The folium is bounded forward by two oblique spots converging forward and adorned back, on the longitudinal midline, with three lighter spots. The ventral region is brownish and marked by three black longitudinal lines.

== Species ==
As of November 2026, this genus includes four species:

- Paralarinia agnata Grasshoff, 1970 – DR Congo
- Paralarinia bartelsi (Lessert, 1933) – South Africa
- Paralarinia denisi (Lessert, 1938) – DR Congo (type species)
- Paralarinia incerta (Tullgren, 1910) – Central, East Africa
