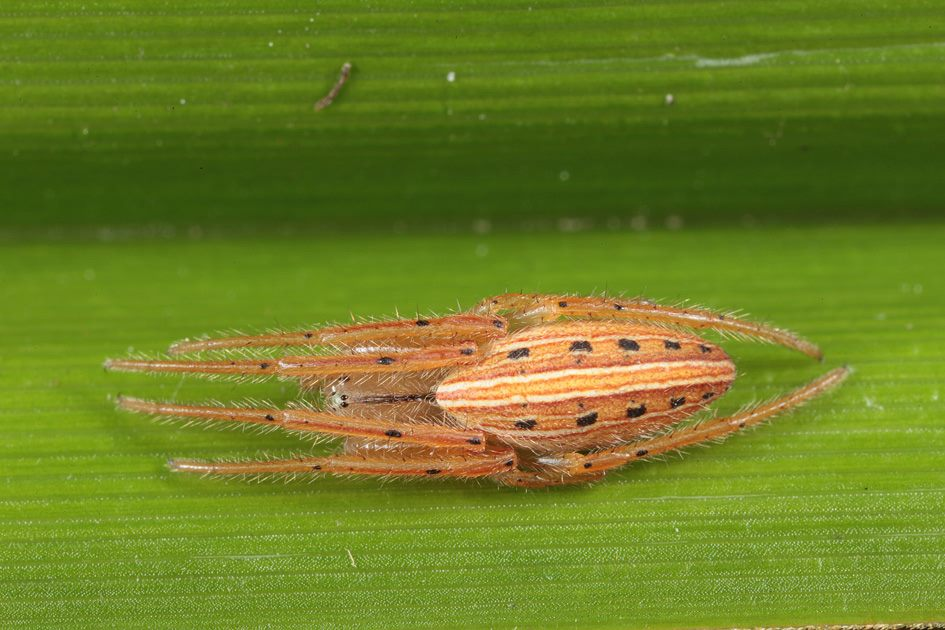
- Larinia jeskovi

Scientific classification
- Kingdom: Animalia
- Phylum: Arthropoda
- Subphylum: Chelicerata
- Class: Arachnida
- Order: Araneae
- Infraorder: Araneomorphae
- Family: Araneidae
- Genus: Larinia
- Species: L. jeskovi

Binomial name
- Larinia jeskovi Marusik, 1987

= Larinia jeskovi =

Species of arachnid

Larinia jeskovi is a species of the family of orb weaver spiders and a part of the genus Larinia. It is distributed throughout the Americas, Africa, Australia, Europe, and Asia and commonly found in wet climes such as marshes, bogs, and rainforests. Larinia jeskovi have yellow bodies with stripes and range from 5.13 to 8.70 millimeters in body length. They build their webs on plants with a small height above small bodies of waters or wetlands. After sunset and before sunrise are the typical times they hunt and build their web. Males usually occupy a female's web instead of making their own. The mating behavior is noteworthy as male spiders often mutilate external female genitalia to reduce sperm competition while female spiders resort to sexual cannibalism to counter such mechanisms. The males also follow an elaborate courtship ritual to attract the female. The bite of Larinia jeskovi is not known to be of harm to humans.

== Description ==
Both male and female Larinia jeskovi are distinguished by a yellow carapace with a dark brown median stripe. The sternum and labium are both yellow as well. Their oval shaped abdomen displays five orange longitudinal stripes on the dorsal surface. The female has a Y-shaped pattern on its sternum, while the male has a X-shaped pattern. Larinia have bristled yellow legs that are often patterned with brown spots. Additionally, some female specimens can have a row of black spots on the abdomen.

=== Sizes ===
The spiders do not seem to display sexual dimorphism. Data from a sample of the Larinia jeskovi from the Miyagi prefecture in Japan suggests that there is a slight difference in size between the two sexes, but they are relatively similar. The body length of males can range from 5.13 to 6.00 millimeters while the females’ body length can be between 8.50 and 8.70 millimeters. The carapace width and length of males can range from 1.97 to 2.20 millimeters and 2.83 to 3.30 millimeters respectively. The females’ carapace width and length range from 2.04 to 2.32 millimeters and 3.16 to 3.40 millimeters respectively. The male's abdomen width and length range from 1.50 to 1.63 millimeters and 2.93 to 3.20 millimeters respectively. The female's abdomen width and length range from 2.53 to 2.87 millimeters and 5.20 to 5.93 millimeters respectively. Larinia jeskovi sampled from Poland in the East Palearctic regions displayed similar sizes as well.

=== Genitalia ===
==== Female ====
The female genitalia consist of a triangular epigynum with a scape containing a pocket necessary for coupling insertion. Lips connect to these pockets at the tip.

==== Male ====
The male palpal bulbs have numerous sclerites used when interlocking with the female genitalia. The palpal bulbs hold a lightly sclerotized conductor that lies on the rim of the tegulum. The embolus of the palpal bulb lies on top of the conductor. As the main structure used during sperm transfer, the embolus comes in many different shapes. In some Larinia species, a few examples of forms are curved rods, diagonal rods, or even anchor-shaped rods. Near the embolus lies the median apophysis. There are also the flattened subterminal and terminal apophyses which point typically in the same direction. The direction may differ according to the species. The male palpal bulb and the female scapus tightly interlock leading to a highly sensitive copulatory position.

== Population structure, speciation, and phylogeny ==
Larinia jeskovi is a species within the Larinia genus which is a part of the commonly known family of orb-weaver spiders, Araneidae. They are in the Arthropoda phylum, the Arachnida class, and the Araneae order. There are between 30 and 40 species of Larinia around the world. Most of the species have similar sizes and preferences for climes but may have slight differences in anatomical structures such as genitalia.

== Habitat and distribution ==
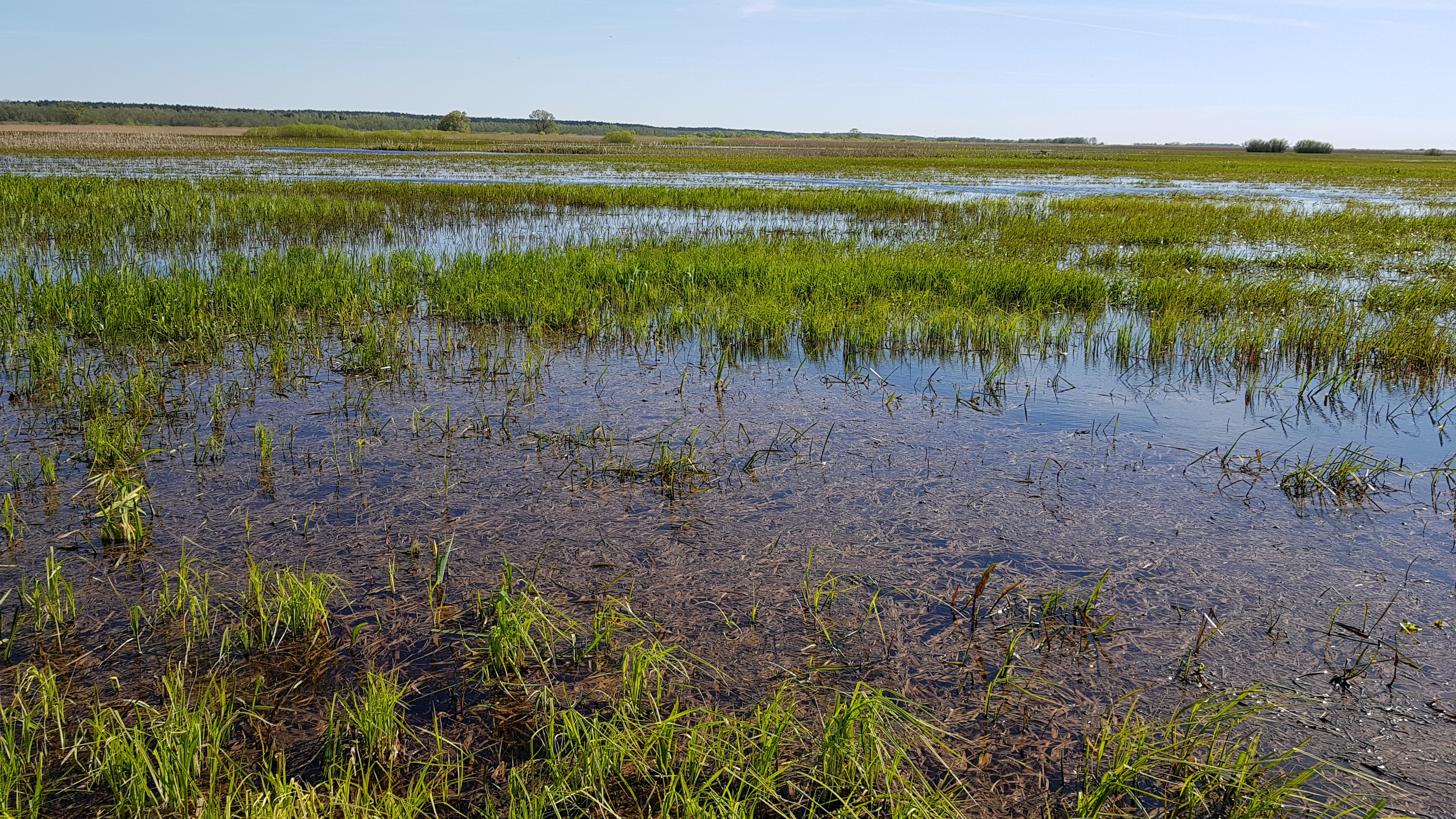
Habitat, Biebrza National Park in Poland (2021)

Larinia jeskovi that have been found in Poland of the East Palearctic regions reside in open sedge moss marshes (Pecuedano-Caricetum paradoxae) and tall sedge marshes, (Caricetum hudsonii) reaffirming the species' preference for humid climates near areas of water. They also reside throughout the Americas, Africa, Australia, Europe, and Asia in marshes, bogs, rainforests, and other humid climes.

== Diet and predation ==
Larinia jeskovi build their webs and hunt exclusively after sunset and before sunrise. In order to accommodate for a web that can be quickly consumed or dismantled, the spiders create thin webs. Although there lacks specific data on its range of prey, it can be assumed that it consumes relatively small prey like gnats according to the fragility of its trap. Like many of its closely related orb-weaver spiders, Larinia jeskovi sense prey when captured through vibrations and completely wrap its prey in a cocoon-like envelope before consumption.

== Webs ==
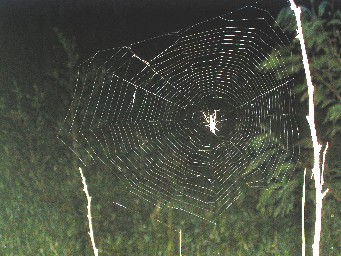
Similar web of a different species, Larinia phthisica

Larinia jeskovi build vertical wheel-shaped webs that are easily created and dismantled like many other orb-weaver spiders. This is called an orb web, one of the most famous web types. With a radius ranging from fifteen centimeters to twenty-one centimeters, the webs are typically built on plants with a relatively small height above small bodies of waters or wetlands. These webs are constructed in such a way that benefits typical orb-weaver behavior. Tension in the web can be controlled in order to better sense vibrations from prey or other spiders. The web is also made very thin (1-3 μm) in order to be efficient and resources and limit web visibility to prey. In Poland, spiders reside primarily in bulrush, reed, and sedge above water. As a nocturnal species, these spiders rest at water level during the day and build their webs exclusively at night. This also makes it harder for prey to see their already thin webs. The webs are constructed after sunset and recycled before dawn through ingestion. Before periods of heavy rain and wind, Larinia jeskovi quickly disassemble their webs and relocate to dense areas of vegetation. This is due to the fact that their webs are very fragile.

== Social behavior ==
Males typically wander to occupy females’ webs instead of their own. However, there have been observations with fully mature males residing in their own webs. During prime mating season in the summer months, a large proportion of males can be found near the vicinity or at the edges of female spiders’ webs.

== Mating ==
Sexual conflict over mating is common in spiders and can result in a few mechanisms that can increase the reproductive success of one sex while impeding the success of the other. In orb-weaving spiders, males typically implement copulatory plugs. Methods could include the integration of anti-aphrodisiacs or cause physical damage. For instance, male spiders could damage external or internal female genitalia during copulation. The attrition of the organs discourages females from subsequent mating and increases the male's reproductive success through avoidance of sperm competition. In Larinia jeskovi, the process of copulation occurs through a pressure-sensitive interlocking mechanism between the male's pedipalps and the female's coupling scapus. Thus, a slight discourse on the male's part could result in adverse damage on the female's reproductive system.

=== Courtship ===
The courtship behavior of Larinia jeskovi is similar to many of the members of the orb-weaver family. Mature male spiders often occupy the edges of a female's web with hopes to court the female. He does so through triggering vibrations along the threads of the web with his legs. After the female responds, the male further fabricates a “mating” thread from the hub to the edge of the web. If the female spider accepts courtship, she rides the “mating” thread and proceeds into copulatory posture with the male.

=== Mutilation of external female genitalia ===
During copulation, the male of the Larinia jeskovi mutilates the genitals of its female partner during copulation. With initial insertion, the female epigynum connects with sclerites on the male pedipalps. After being secured, the embolus of the pedipalps then goes into the copulatory duct and the attached apophysis inserts into the funnel of the scapus which is an important external female genital structure for coupling during copulation. The conductor of the male palpus along with the parallel tegular apophysis partially damages the scapus. As a result, a series of insertions may result in temporary or complete inhibition of female copulatory function.

==== Female costs ====
External genital mutilation is highly prevalent with the large proportion of females found to have without a scapus near the end of the mating season. Female spiders incur costs including inability to mate with other partners and energy spent towards healing wounds and preventing infections. Despite the significant costs of the mechanism, indirect benefits such as bearing male offspring with the same fitness advantage may influence the female's acceptance.

=== Female sexual cannibalism ===
Female Larinia jeskovi have evolved means to control their reproductive fitness. They perform sexual cannibalism during copulation as a mechanism to combat external genital mutilation initiated through male insertion. This behavior promptly ends copulation after one insertion. Further insertions would lead to the complete removal of female genitalia. In doing so, the females are able to maintain their reproductive fitness and reduce costs towards recovery. Not all females consume their partner during copulation. Moreover, the occurrence of cannibalism may depend on the size or physical condition of the male. When males occupy female webs, a larger male size correlates with more insertions and smaller likelihood of being cannibalized while males in better physical conditions were more likely to be consumed.

== Reproduction ==
=== Egg sacs ===
As mating occurs during the summer, female spiders typically lay their egg sacs in September. The egg sacs rest on the female's vertical web typically attached to a small plant such as a shrub. As a polyandrous species, females may have multiple mates and a single egg sac may contain offspring from several male partners.

== Bites to prey and humans ==
Like most orb-weaver spiders, Larinia jeskovi seem to exhibit the ability to fatally impair their prey through their venomous bites. There has been no record of harm caused by bites towards humans.
