= Larinia borealis =

Scientific classification
- Domain: Eukaryota
- Kingdom: Animalia
- Phylum: Arthropoda
- Subphylum: Chelicerata
- Class: Arachnida
- Order: Araneae
- Infraorder: Araneomorphae
- Family: Araneidae
- Genus: Larinia
- Species: L. borealis

Binomial name
- Larinia borealis Banks, 1894

Species of spider

Larinia borealis is a species of orb weaver in the family of spiders known as Araneidae. It is found in North America.
