= Larinia bifida =

Larinia Grass Orb-Web Spider

Conservation status
- Least Concern (SANBI Red List)

Scientific classification
- Kingdom: Animalia
- Phylum: Arthropoda
- Subphylum: Chelicerata
- Class: Arachnida
- Order: Araneae
- Infraorder: Araneomorphae
- Family: Araneidae
- Genus: Larinia
- Species: L. bifida

Binomial name
- Larinia bifida Tullgren, 1910

Species of spider

Larinia bifida is a species of spider in the family Araneidae. It is found across several African countries and is commonly known as the Larinia grass orb-web spider.

== Distribution ==
Larinia bifida has a wide distribution across seven African countries. The species is known from Botswana, Central African Republic, Democratic Republic of the Congo, Malawi, Tanzania, Seychelles, and South Africa.

In South Africa, the species occurs across five provinces: Eastern Cape, Free State, Gauteng, North West, and Western Cape. Notable locations include Mountain Zebra National Park, Table Mountain National Park, and various nature reserves.

== Habitat and ecology ==
The species inhabits Grassland and Fynbos biomes at altitudes ranging from 3 to 1,730 metres above sea level. Larinia bifida is an orb-web spider that constructs orb-webs in grass at night. This is a typical grassland species, resembling grass in shape and colour. They are not easily seen and are usually sampled with a sweep net. When at rest they stretch their body and legs along a blade of grass.

== Conservation ==
Larinia bifida is listed as Least Concern by the South African National Biodiversity Institute due to its wide geographical range. The species is protected in six protected areas including Mountain Zebra National Park and Table Mountain National Park.

== Taxonomy ==
The species was originally described by Albert Tullgren in 1910 from Tanzania. The species was revised by Manfred Grasshoff in 1970. Known only from the female.
