= Lipocrea epeiroides =

Scientific classification
- Kingdom: Animalia
- Phylum: Arthropoda
- Subphylum: Chelicerata
- Class: Arachnida
- Order: Araneae
- Infraorder: Araneomorphae
- Family: Araneidae
- Genus: Lipocrea
- Species: L. epeiroides

Binomial name
- Lipocrea epeiroides (O. P.-Cambridge, 1872)

Synonyms
- Argiope epeiroides O. Pickard-Cambridge, 1872; Larinia epeiroides Simon, 1895; Larinia chloris Grasshoff, 1970

Species of spider

Lipocrea epeiroides is an orb-weaving spider species found in Greece, Cyprus, Turkey, Israel, Yemen and India.
