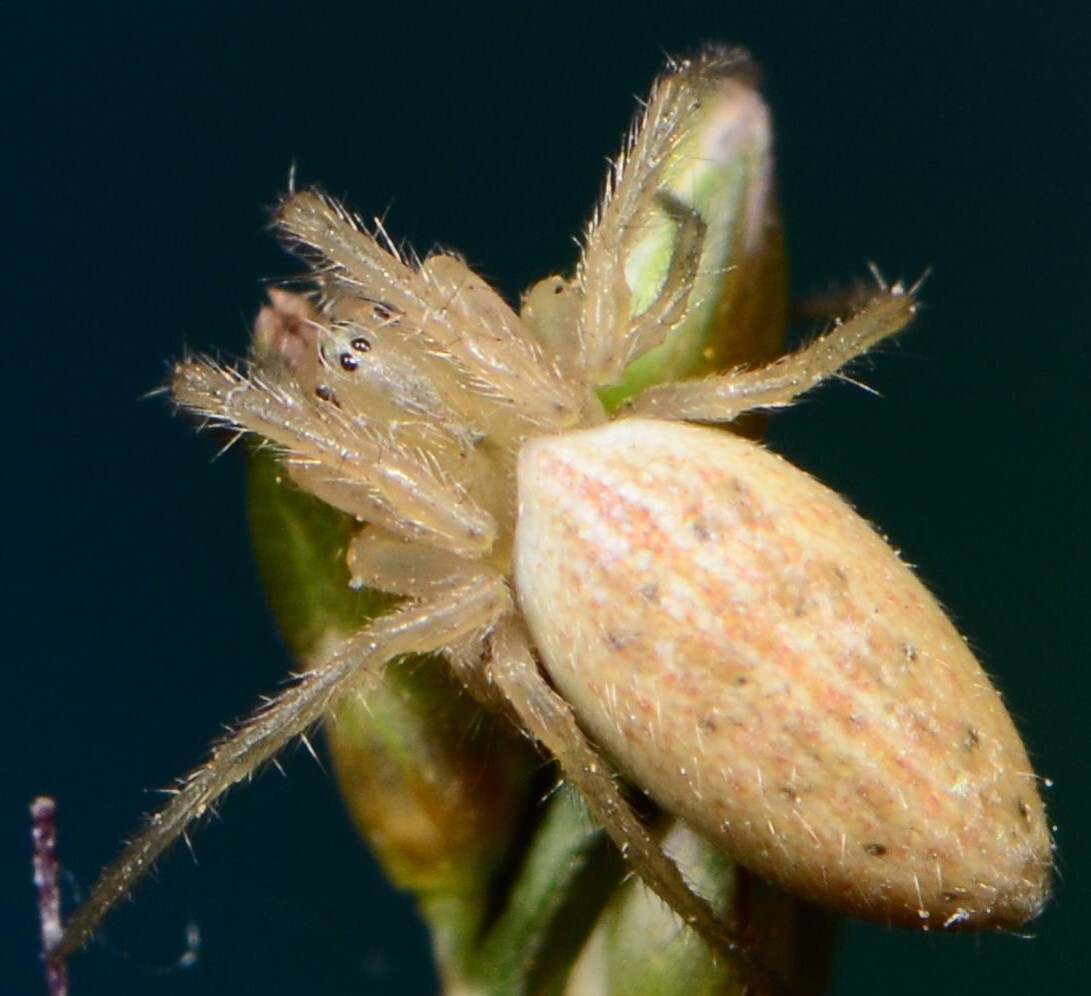
- Female
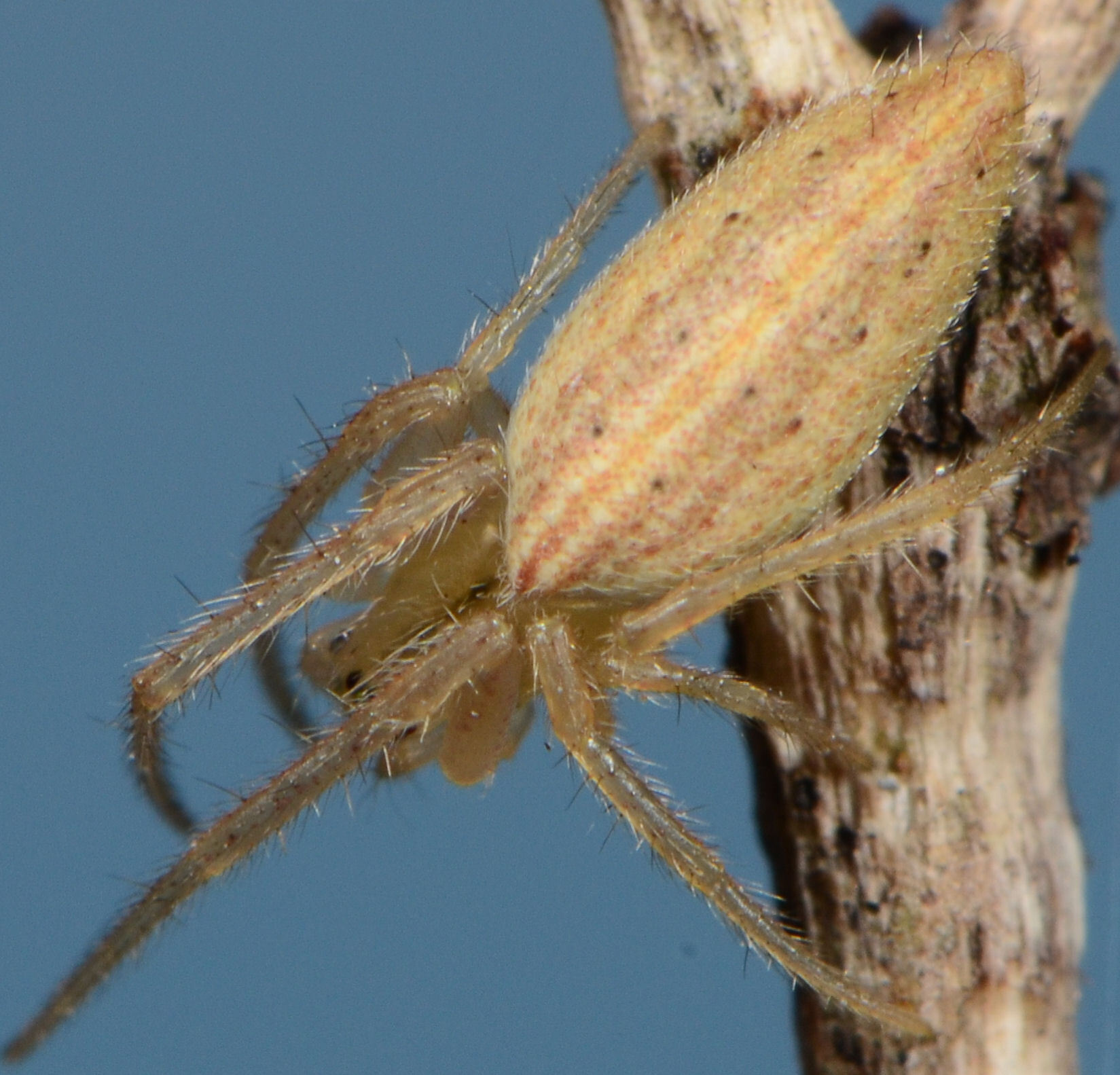
- Female

Scientific classification
- Kingdom: Animalia
- Phylum: Arthropoda
- Subphylum: Chelicerata
- Class: Arachnida
- Order: Araneae
- Infraorder: Araneomorphae
- Family: Araneidae
- Genus: Lipocrea
- Species: L. longissima

Binomial name
- Lipocrea longissima (Simon, 1881)

Synonyms
- Larinia fasciata Thorell, 1899; Larinia quinquepunctata Tullgren, 1910; Larinia tibelloides Lessert, 1930; Larinia quinquepunctata concolor Caporiacco, 1947

= Lipocrea longissima =

Lipocrea Grass Orb-Web Spider

Species of spider

Lipocrea longissima is a species of spider in the family Araneidae. It is found across Central, East, and Southern Africa and is commonly known as the Lipocrea grass orb-web spider.

== Distribution ==
Lipocrea longissima has a wide distribution throughout Central, East, and Southern Africa. The species is known from Lesotho, Botswana, and South Africa.

In South Africa, the species is widely distributed across seven provinces: Free State, Eastern Cape, Gauteng, KwaZulu-Natal, Limpopo, Mpumalanga, and Western Cape. Notable locations include Hluhluwe-Imfolozi Park, iSimangaliso Wetland Park, Ndumo Game Reserve, Tembe Elephant Park, and Bontebok National Park.

== Habitat and ecology ==
The species inhabits Fynbos, Forest, Indian Ocean Coastal Belt, Grassland, and Savanna biomes at altitudes ranging from 3 to 1,706 m above sea level. Lipocrea longissima makes orb-webs in grass and removes them early in the morning. The species has been sampled from avocado and pecan orchards, as well as tomato fields.

== Conservation ==
Lipocrea longissima is listed as Least Concern by the South African National Biodiversity Institute due to its wide geographical range. There are no significant threats to the species. The species is sampled from more than 10 protected areas including Mkambathi Nature Reserve, Erfenis Dam Nature Reserve, and Ndumo Game Reserve.

== Taxonomy ==
The species was originally described by Eugène Simon in 1881 as Larinia longissima. Manfred Grasshoff revised the species in 1970 and transferred it to the genus Larinopa, synonymizing several species. Known from both sexes.
