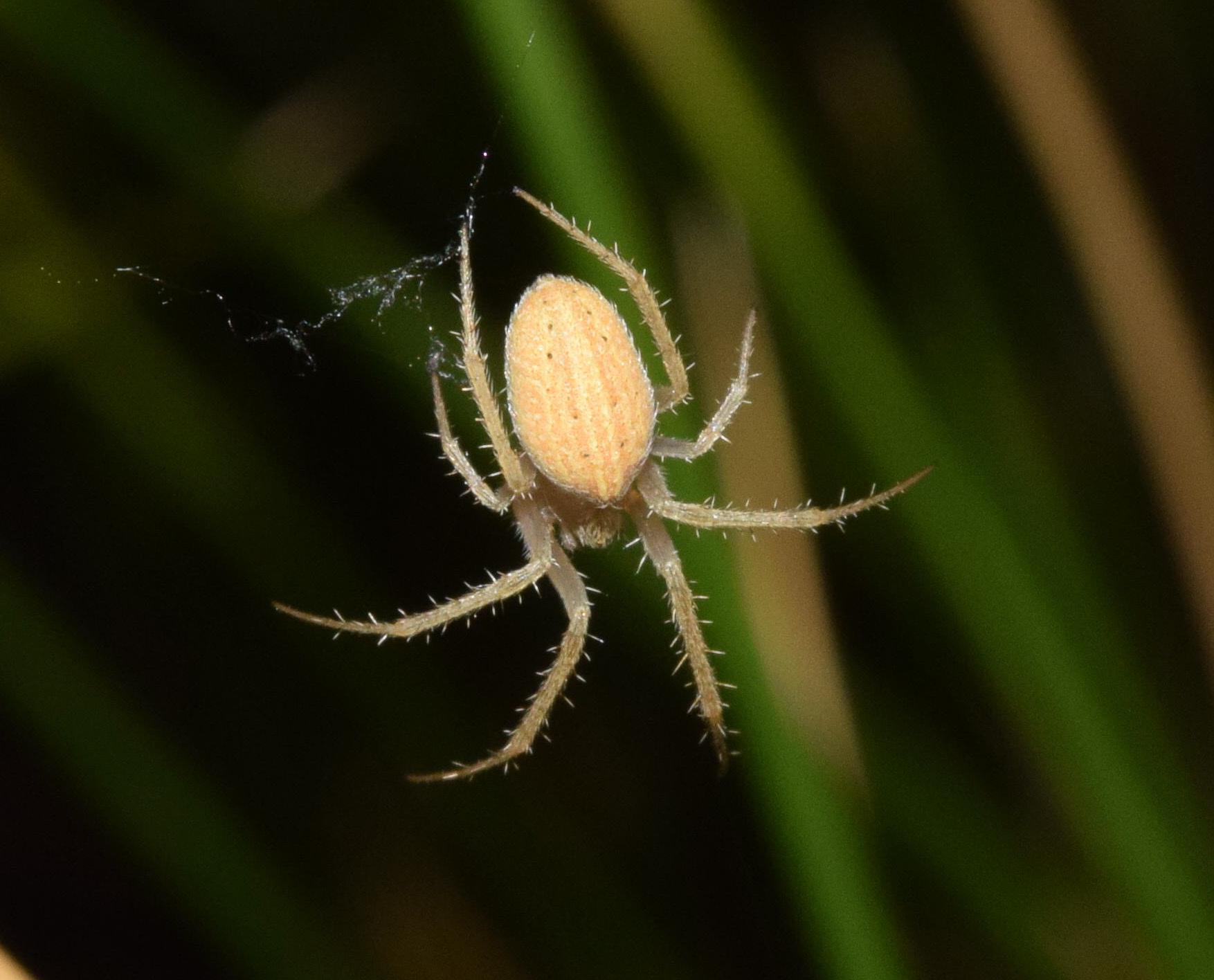

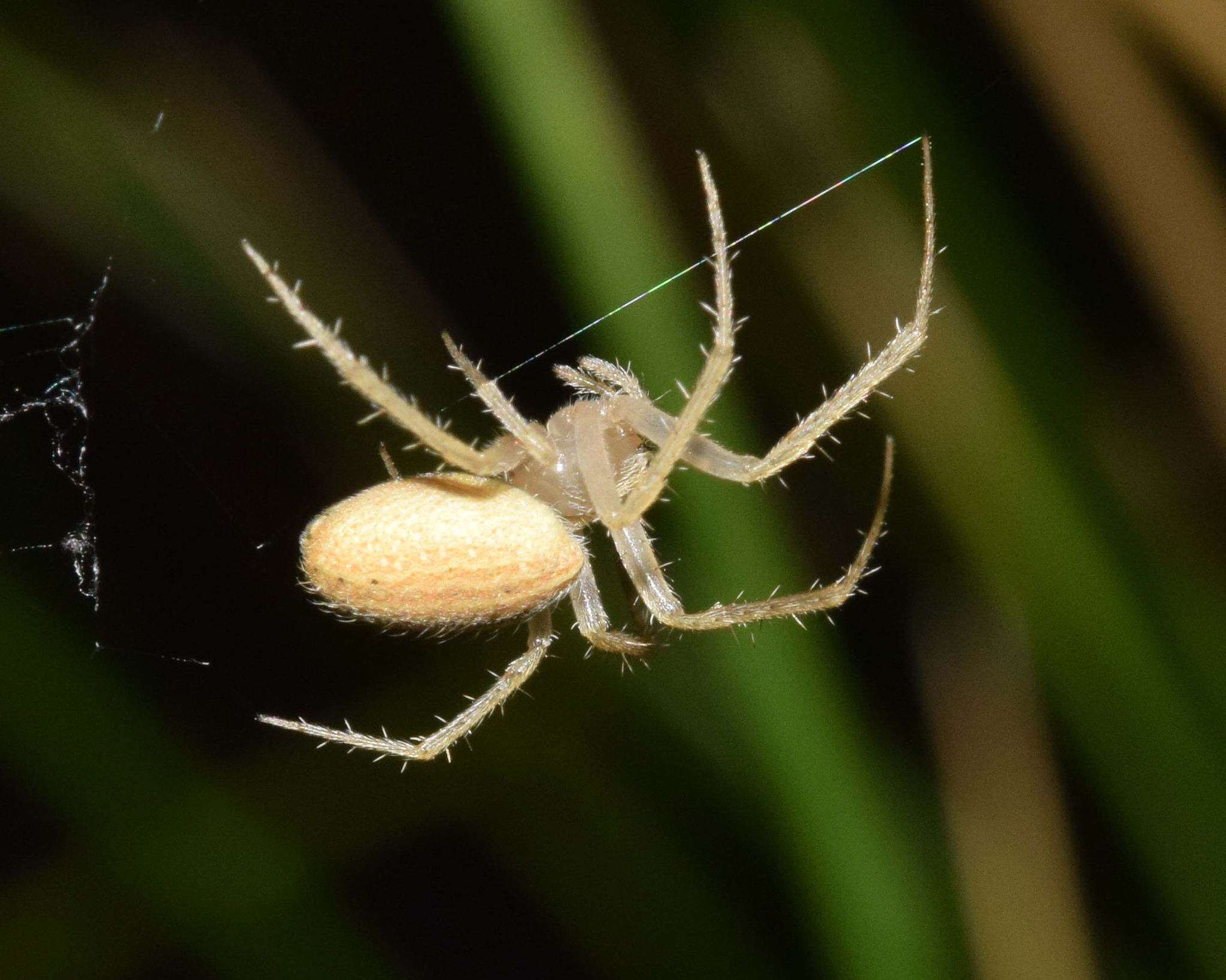

Scientific classification
- Kingdom: Animalia
- Phylum: Arthropoda
- Subphylum: Chelicerata
- Class: Arachnida
- Order: Araneae
- Infraorder: Araneomorphae
- Family: Araneidae
- Genus: Larinia
- Species: L. natalensis

Binomial name
- Larinia natalensis (Grasshoff, 1971)

= Larinia natalensis =

Species of spider

Larinia natalensis is a species of spider in the family Araneidae. It is endemic to South Africa.

== Distribution ==
Larinia natalensis is endemic to South Africa, where it occurs across six provinces, Gauteng, KwaZulu-Natal, Limpopo, North West, Northern Cape, and Western Cape. Notable locations include Giant's Castle Nature Reserve, Swartberg Nature Reserve, De Hoop Nature Reserve, and Polokwane Nature Reserve.

== Habitat and ecology ==
The species inhabits Fynbos, Indian Ocean Coastal Belt, Grassland, and Savanna biomes at altitudes ranging from 55 to 1,842 m above sea level. Larinia natalensis is an orb-web spider that constructs their webs in grass. The species has also been sampled from cotton fields.

== Conservation ==
Larinia natalensis is listed as Least Concern by the South African National Biodiversity Institute due to its geographical range. There are no known threats to the species. The species is protected in ten reserves including De Hoop Nature Reserve, Polokwane Nature Reserve, Swartberg Nature Reserve, and Legalameetse Nature Reserve.

== Taxonomy ==
The species was originally described by Manfred Grasshoff in 1971 as Drexelia natalensis, with the type locality given only as Natal. Known only from the female.
