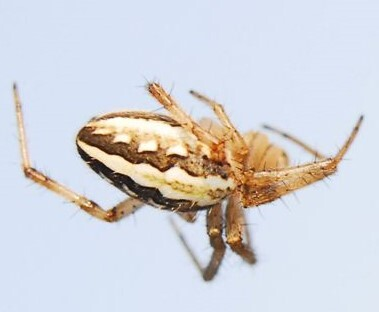
- Female
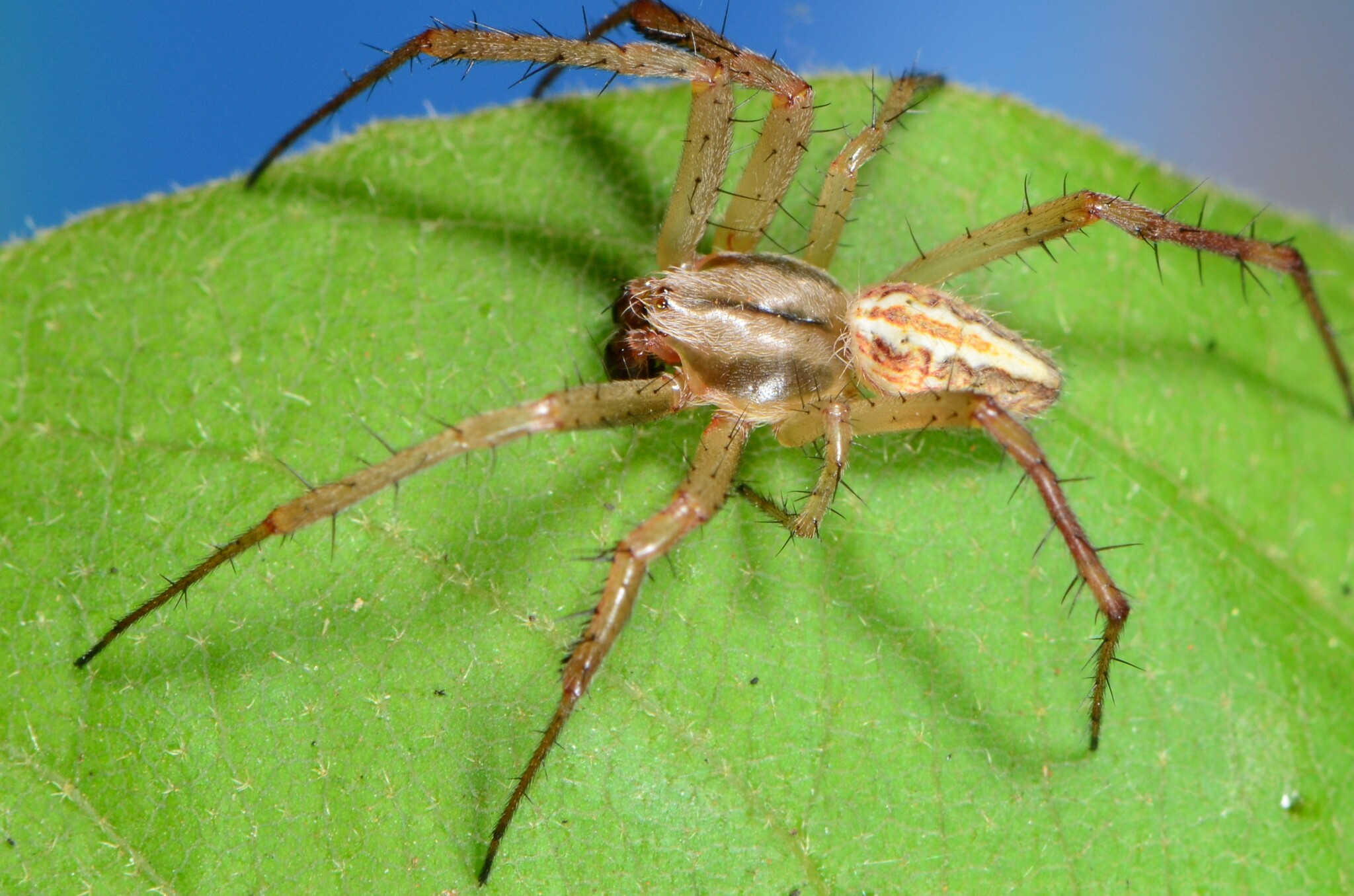
- Male

Scientific classification
- Kingdom: Animalia
- Phylum: Arthropoda
- Subphylum: Chelicerata
- Class: Arachnida
- Order: Araneae
- Infraorder: Araneomorphae
- Family: Araneidae
- Genus: Neoscona
- Species: N. moreli

Binomial name
- Neoscona moreli (Vinson, 1863)

Synonyms
- Epeira lanuginosa Lenz, 1886; Araneus neotheis Petrunkevitch, 1911; Cubanella nidicola Franganillo, 1926; Cubanella recta Franganillo, 1930; Neoscona seca Roberts, 1983

= Neoscona moreli =

Morel's Grass Neoscona Orb-Web Spider

Species of spider

Neoscona moreli is a species of spider in the family Araneidae. It is commonly known as Morel's grass Neoscona orb-web spider.

== Distribution ==
Neoscona moreli has a very wide global distribution, known from the Afrotropical Region, Cuba, and Argentina. In Southern Africa, it is recorded from Botswana and South Africa.

The species is found in all nine provinces of South Africa and occurs in more than ten protected areas at altitudes ranging from 12 to 2,020 m above sea level.

== Habitat and ecology ==
The species is a very common grassland species that makes its web at night and removes it early in the morning. It has been sampled from the Forest, Grassland, Indian Ocean Coastal Belt, Nama Karoo, Savanna, and Thicket biomes. The species has also been sampled from avocado, pecans and pistachio orchards, and cotton, lucerne, maize and tomato fields.

== Description ==
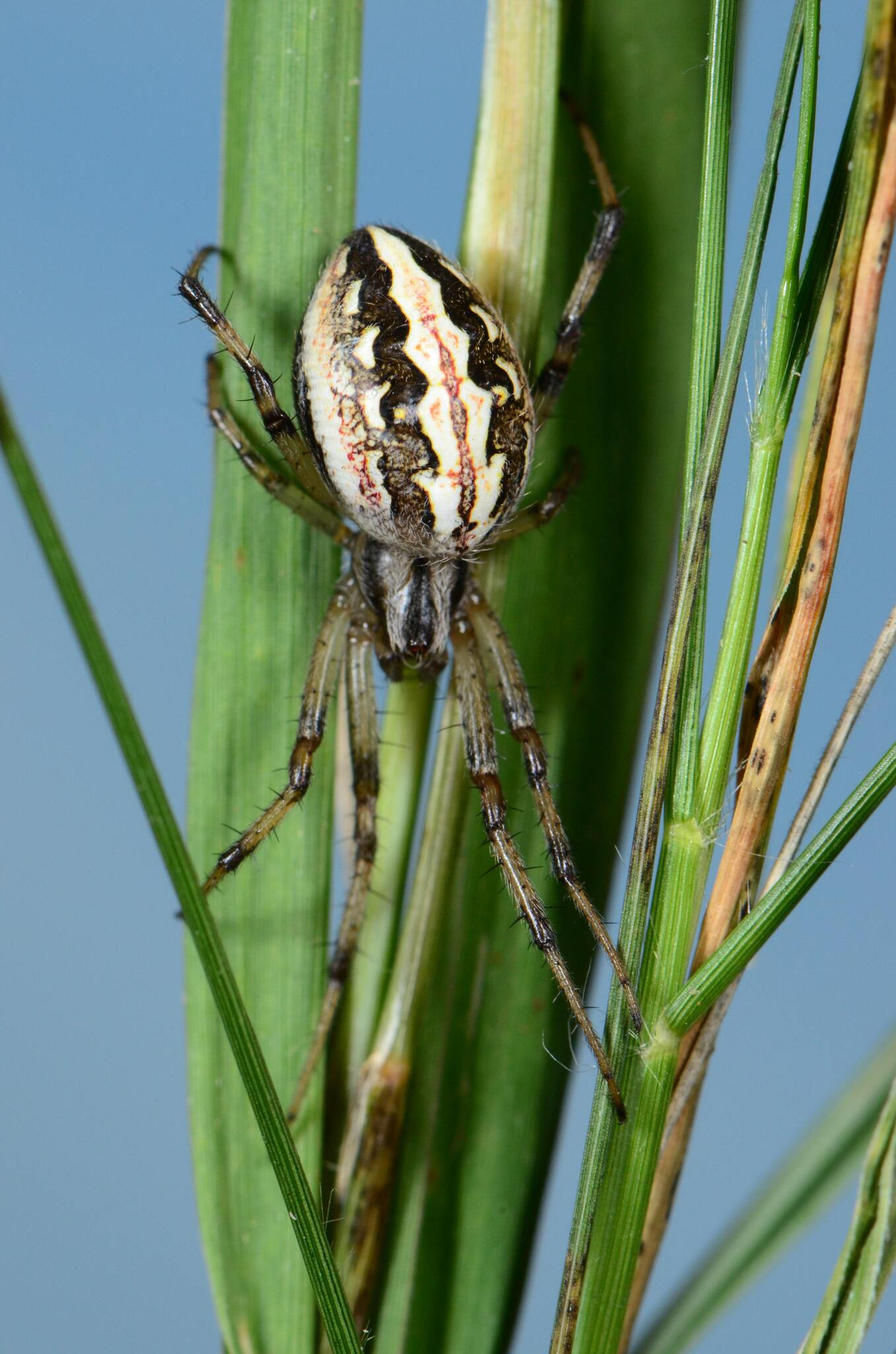
female

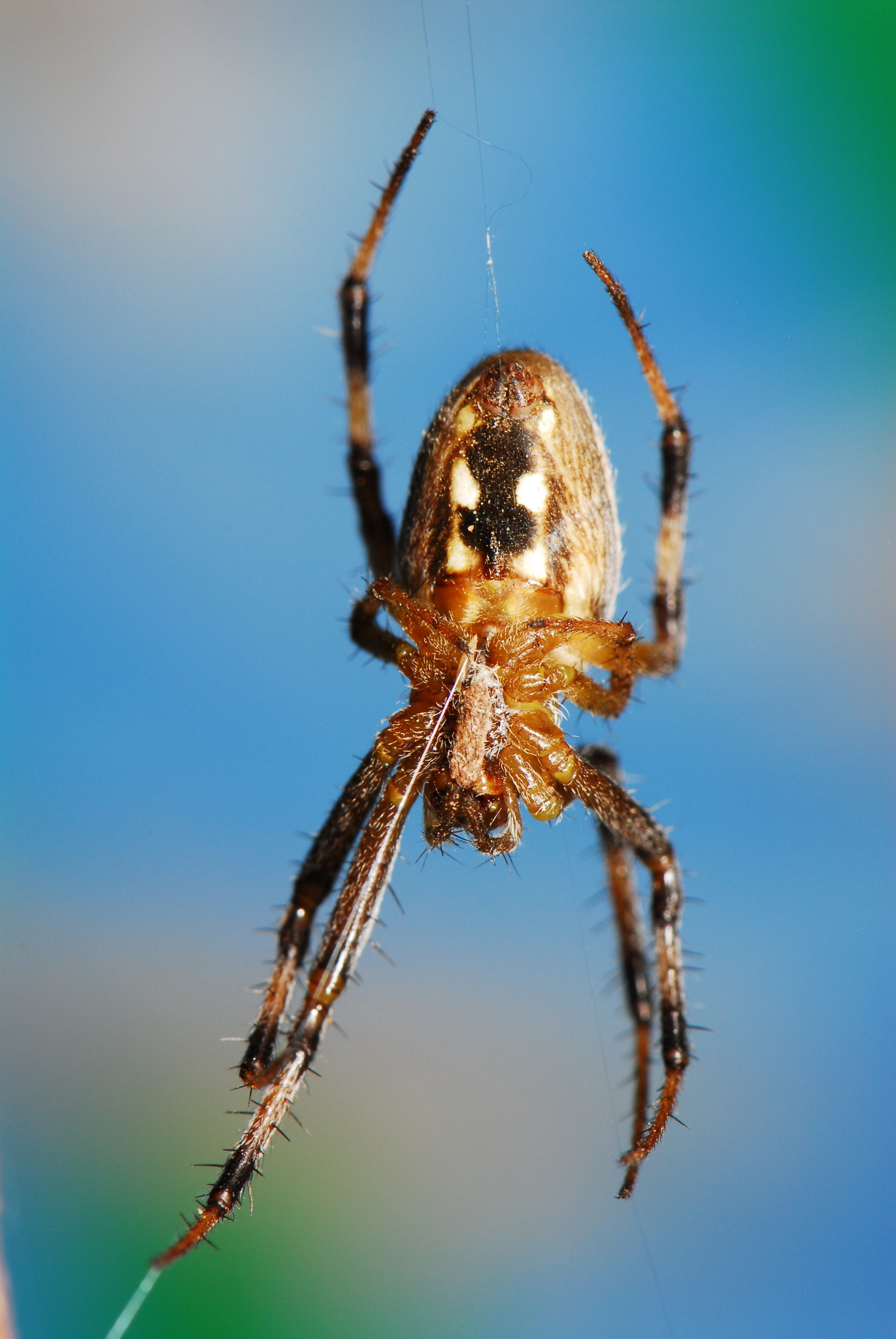
female

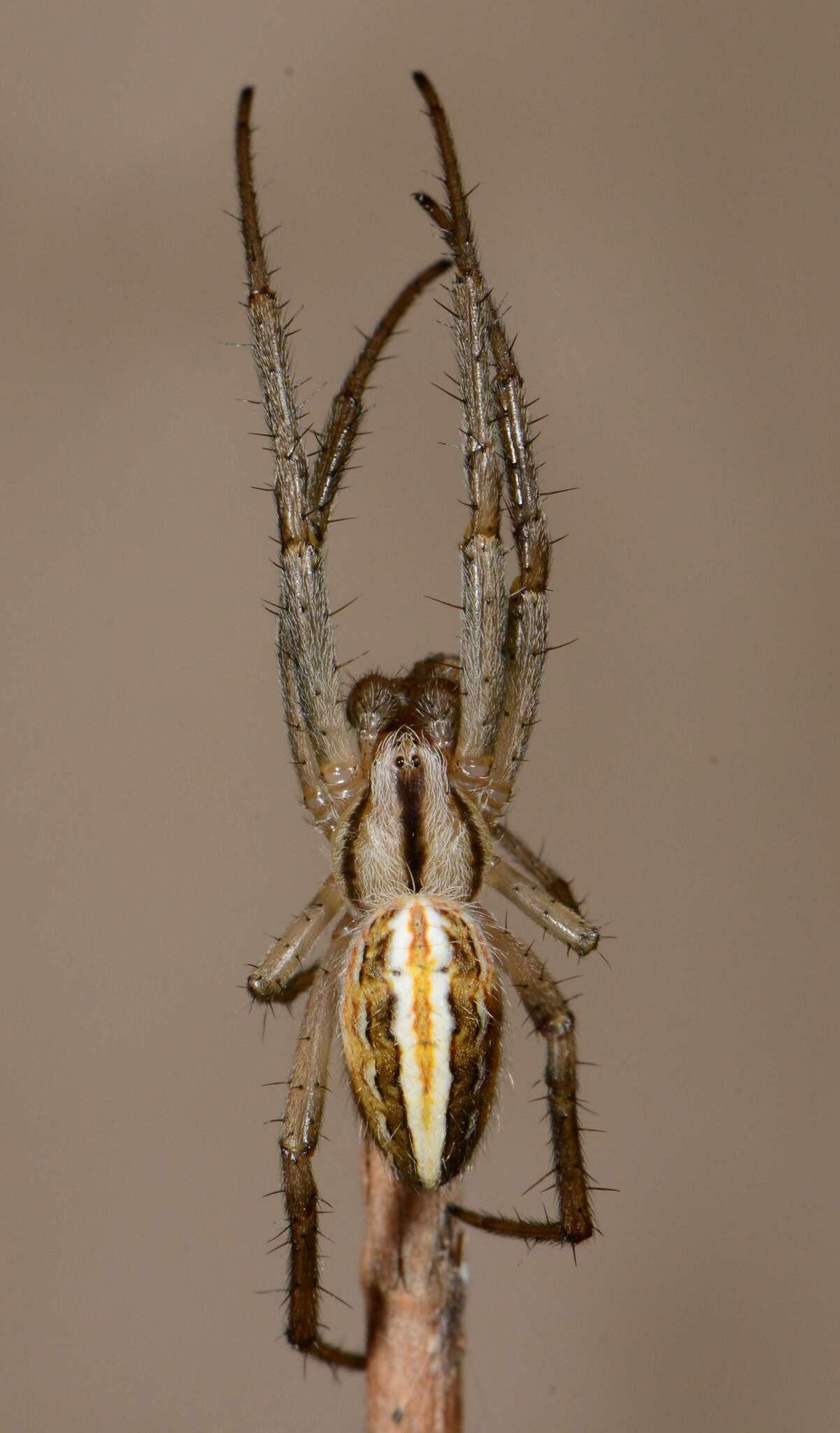
male

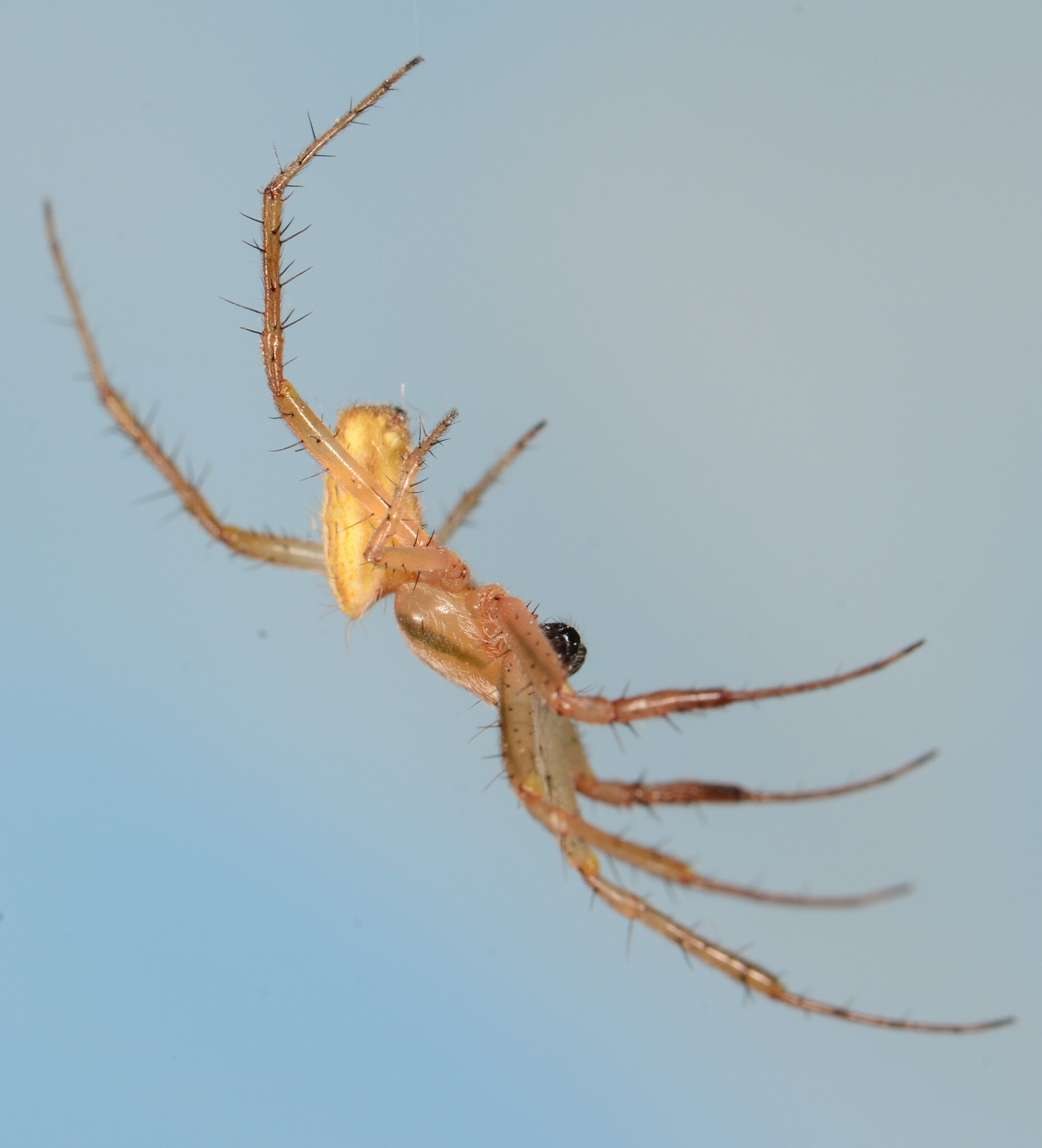
male

== Conservation ==
Neoscona moreli is listed as Least Concern by the South African National Biodiversity Institute due to its wide geographical range. There are no known threats to the species. The species has been sampled in more than 10 protected areas including Mkambati Nature Reserve, Roodeplaatdam Nature Reserve, Makalali Nature Reserve, Polokwane Nature Reserve, Erfenis Dam Nature Reserve, and Mpetsane Conservation Estate.

== Taxonomy ==
The species was described by Vinson in 1863 from Réunion as Epeira morelii. It was revised by Grasshoff in 1986, who synonymized several species including Araneus lanuginosus, Neoscona neotheis, and N. seca.
