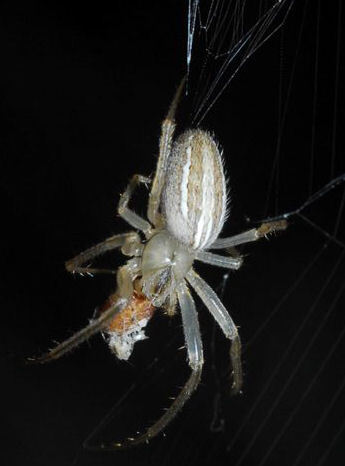
- L. chloris
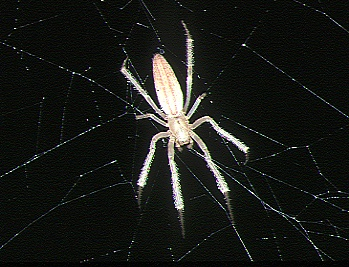
- female Larinia phthisica from Okinawa

Scientific classification
- Kingdom: Animalia
- Phylum: Arthropoda
- Subphylum: Chelicerata
- Class: Arachnida
- Order: Araneae
- Infraorder: Araneomorphae
- Family: Araneidae
- Genus: Larinia; Simon, 1874

Type species
- L. lineata (Lucas, 1846)

Species
- 69, see text

= Larinia =

Genus of spiders

Larinia is a genus of orb-weaver spiders first described by Eugène Simon in 1874.

== Life style ==
The spiders have straw-coloured bodies. This is a typical grassland species, resembling grass in shape and colour. They construct loosely woven webs in grass. They are not easily seen and usually sampled with a sweep net. When at rest they stretch their body and legs along a blade of grass.

== Description ==
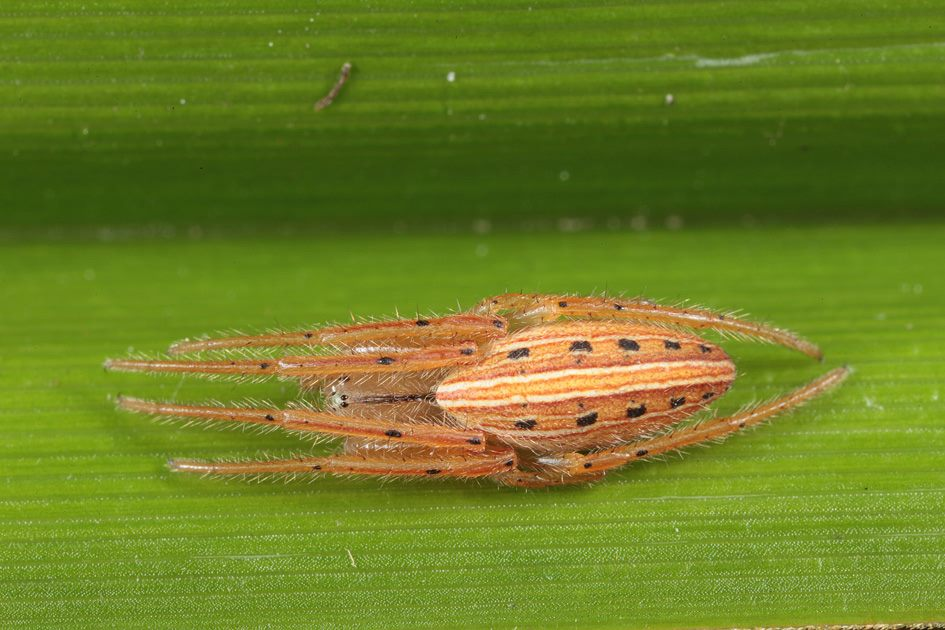
L. jeskovi

Spiders in genus Larinia are medium-sized araneids with a narrow, elongated body. The carapace is longer than it is wide with a short, grooved longitudinal fovea. The anterior median eyes are largest, the median ocular quadrangle is appreciably wider in front than behind. The chelicerae have 3-4 promarginal and retromarginal teeth. The abdomen is distinctly longer than wide.

The epigynum of the female bears a slender scape with rigid attachment at base. The scape frequently breaks off. Legs are I longest, legs III shortest. They can be confused with Kilima decens but here the median lines with slight curves.

== Species ==
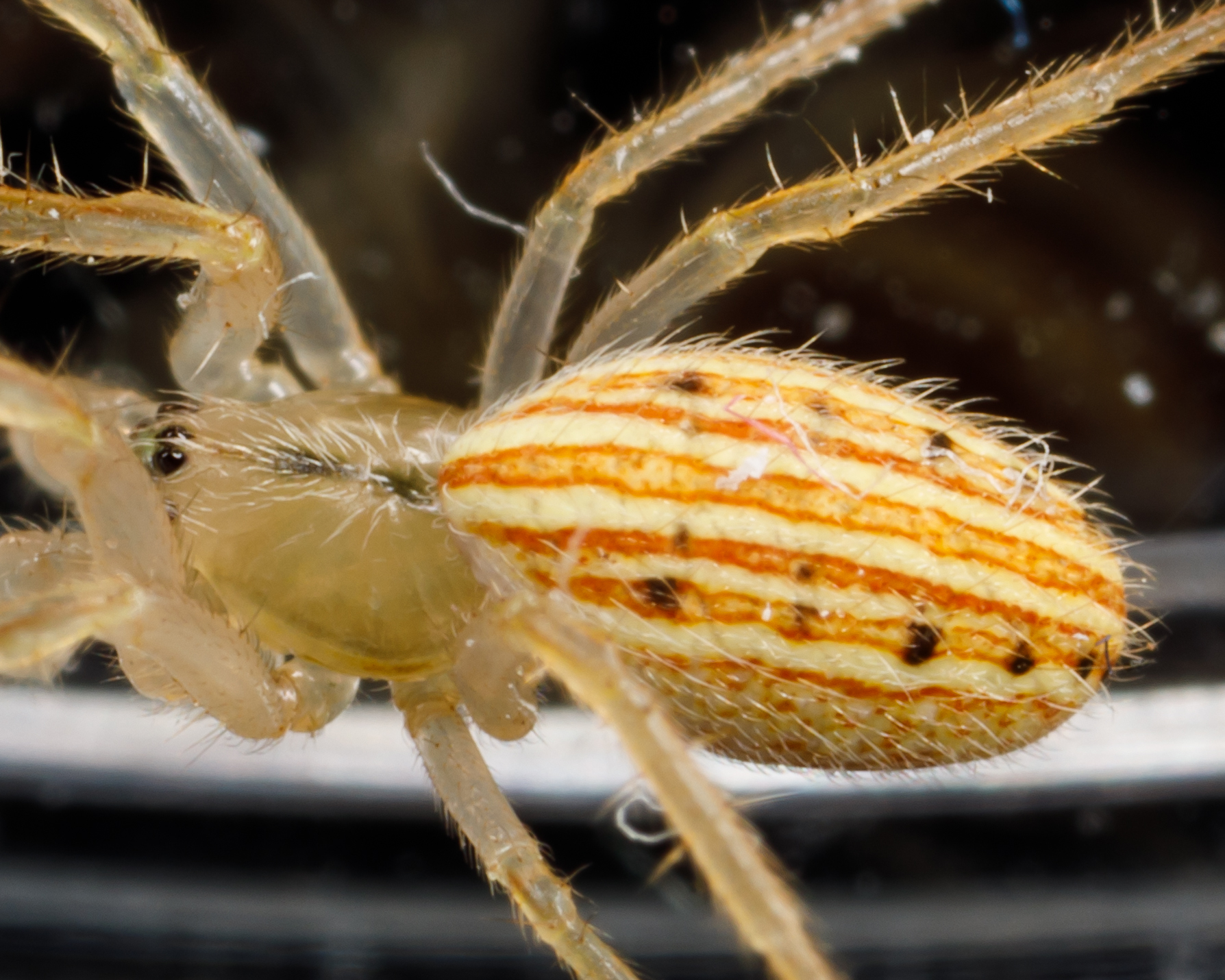
L. borealis

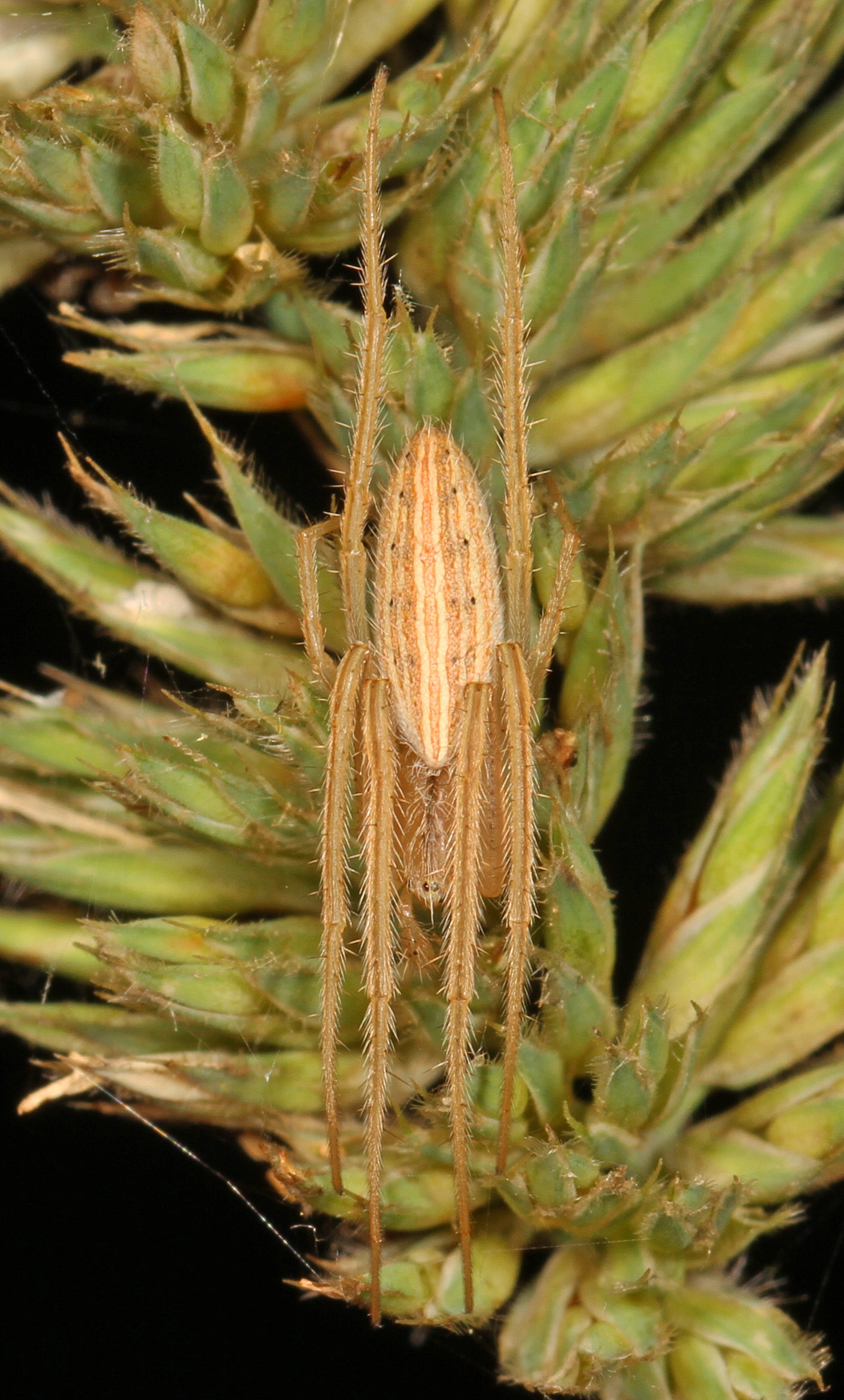
L. directa

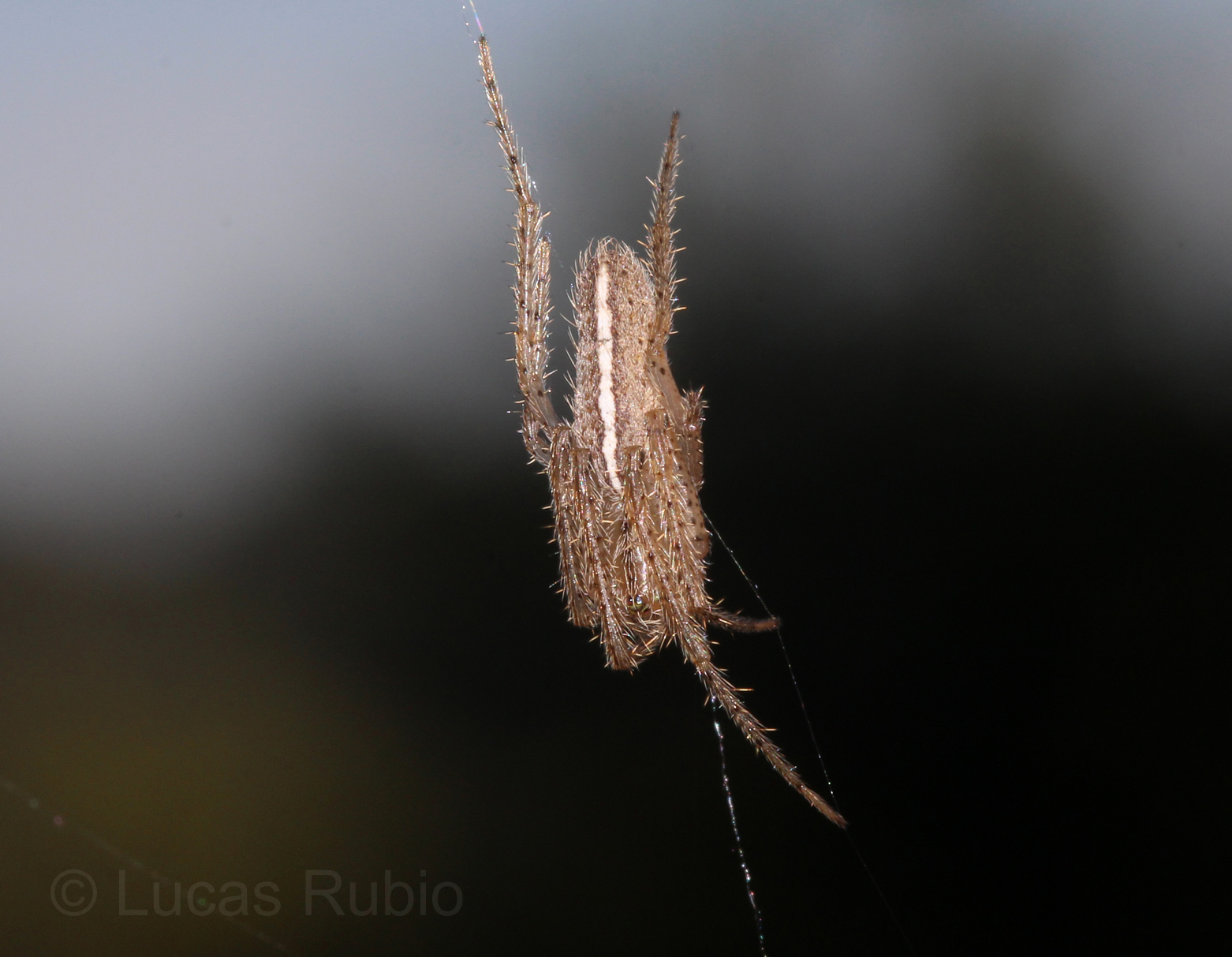
L. t-notata

== Species ==
As of November 2026, this genus includes 69 species:

- Larinia acuticauda Simon, 1906 – West Africa to Israel
- Larinia ambo Harrod, Levi & Leibensperger, 1991 – Ecuador, Peru
- Larinia argiopiformis Bösenberg & Strand, 1906 – Russia (Far East), China, Korea, Japan
- Larinia assimilis Tullgren, 1910 – DR Congo, Tanzania
- Larinia astrigera Yin, Wang, Xie & Peng, 1990 – China
- Larinia bharatae Bhandari & Gajbe, 2001 – India
- Larinia bifida Tullgren, 1910 – Central African Rep. DR Congo, Malawi, Tanzania, Botswana, South Africa, Seychelles
- Larinia bivittata Keyserling, 1885 – Brazil, Paraguay, Uruguay, Argentina, Chile
- Larinia blandula (Grasshoff, 1971) – Guinea/Ivory Coast, Togo, Cameroon
- Larinia bonneti Spassky, 1939 – France, Central Europe, Hungary, Caucasus, Russia (Europe to Far East), Japan
- Larinia borealis Banks, 1894 – North America
- Larinia bossae Marusik, 1987 – Russia (South Siberia to Far East)
- Larinia chloris (Audouin, 1826) – Spain, Greece, Cyprus, Turkey, North and East Africa to Israel, Iraq, Iran, India, Sri Lanka, Bangladesh. Introduced to Mozambique, South Africa
- Larinia cyclera Yin, Wang, Xie & Peng, 1990 – China
- Larinia dasia (Roberts, 1983) – Seychelles (Aldabra), Madagascar
- Larinia delicata Rainbow, 1920 – Australia (Lord Howe Is.)
- Larinia diluta (Thorell, 1887) – Myanmar to Indonesia
- Larinia dinanea Yin, Wang, Xie & Peng, 1990 – China
- Larinia directa (Hentz, 1847) – USA to Brazil
- Larinia dubia Ott & Rodrigues, 2017 – Brazil
- Larinia elegans Spassky, 1939 – Austria to China
- Larinia emertoni Gajbe & Gajbe, 2004 – India
- Larinia epeiroides (O. Pickard-Cambridge, 1872) – Spain, Italy (Sardinia, Sicily), Malta, Cyprus, Turkey, Israel, Yemen, India
- Larinia famulatoria (Keyserling, 1883) – United States, Mexico
- Larinia fangxiangensis Zhu, Lian & Chen, 2006 – China
- Larinia foko Escobar-Toledo & Pett, 2024 – Madagascar
- Larinia fusiformis (Thorell, 1877) – India to Japan, Philippines, Indonesia (Sulawesi)
- Larinia guiyang (J. Zhang, Yu & Mi, 2025) – China
- Larinia jamberoo Framenau & Scharff, 2008 – Australia (New South Wales, Victoria, South Australia)
- Larinia jaysankari Biswas, 1984 – India
- Larinia jeskovi Marusik, 1987 – France, Hungary, Poland, Belarus, Russia (Europe to Far East), Japan
- Larinia joei Tanikawa & Petcharad, 2021 – Thailand
- Larinia kampala (Grasshoff, 1971) – Uganda
- Larinia kanpurae Patel & Nigam, 1994 – India
- Larinia lampa Harrod, Levi & Leibensperger, 1991 – Peru, Bolivia
- Larinia lineata (Lucas, 1846) – Western Mediterranean
- Larinia liuae Yin & Bao, 2012 – China
- Larinia longissima (Simon, 1881) – Central, East, Southern Africa
- Larinia macrohooda Yin, Wang, Xie & Peng, 1990 – China
- Larinia madhuchhandae Biswas & Raychaudhuri, 2012 – Bangladesh
- Larinia mandlaensis Gajbe, 2005 – India
- Larinia mariaranoensis Escobar-Toledo & Pett, 2024 – Madagascar
- Larinia microhooda Yin, Wang, Xie & Peng, 1990 – China
- Larinia minor (Bryant, 1945) – Haiti
- Larinia montagui Hogg, 1914 – Australia (mainland, Lord Howe Is., Norfolk Is.)
- Larinia montecarlo (Levi, 1988) – Brazil, Argentina
- Larinia natalensis (Grasshoff, 1971) – South Africa
- Larinia neblina Harrod, Levi & Leibensperger, 1991 – Venezuela
- Larinia nolabelia Yin, Wang, Xie & Peng, 1990 – China, Thailand
- Larinia obtusa (Grasshoff, 1971) – DR Congo
- Larinia onoi Tanikawa, 1989 – Japan
- Larinia parangmata Barrion & Litsinger, 1995 – Philippines
- Larinia phosop Tanikawa, Into & Petcharad, 2023 – Thailand
- Larinia phthisica (L. Koch, 1871) – India to Bangladesh and Vietnam, Usbekistan, Turkmenistan, China, Japan, Philippines, Papua New Guinea, Australia. Introduced to Greece (Crete)
- Larinia pubiventris Simon, 1889 – Kazakhstan, Uzbekistan, Turkmenistan
- Larinia robusta Ott & Rodrigues, 2017 – Brazil
- Larinia sekiguchii Tanikawa, 1989 – Russia (Far East), China, Japan
- Larinia sexta Framenau & Castanheira, 2022 – Australia (Western Australia)
- Larinia strandi Caporiacco, 1941 – Ethiopia
- Larinia t-notata (Tullgren, 1905) – Brazil, Argentina
- Larinia tabida (L. Koch, 1872) – Indonesia, (Sulawesi), New Caledonia
- Larinia tamatave (Grasshoff, 1971) – Madagascar
- Larinia teiraensis B. Biswas & K. Biswas, 2007 – India
- Larinia trifida Tullgren, 1910 – DR Congo, Kenya, Tanzania
- Larinia triprovina Yin, Wang, Xie & Peng, 1990 – China
- Larinia tucuman Harrod, Levi & Leibensperger, 1991 – Brazil, Argentina
- Larinia tumulus Framenau & Castanheira, 2022 – Australia (Western Australia: Barrow Is.)
- Larinia tyloridia Patel, 1975 – India
- Larinia wenshanensis Yin & Yan, 1994 – China

Genera Lariniaria and Lipocrea were synonymized with this genus in 2025.
