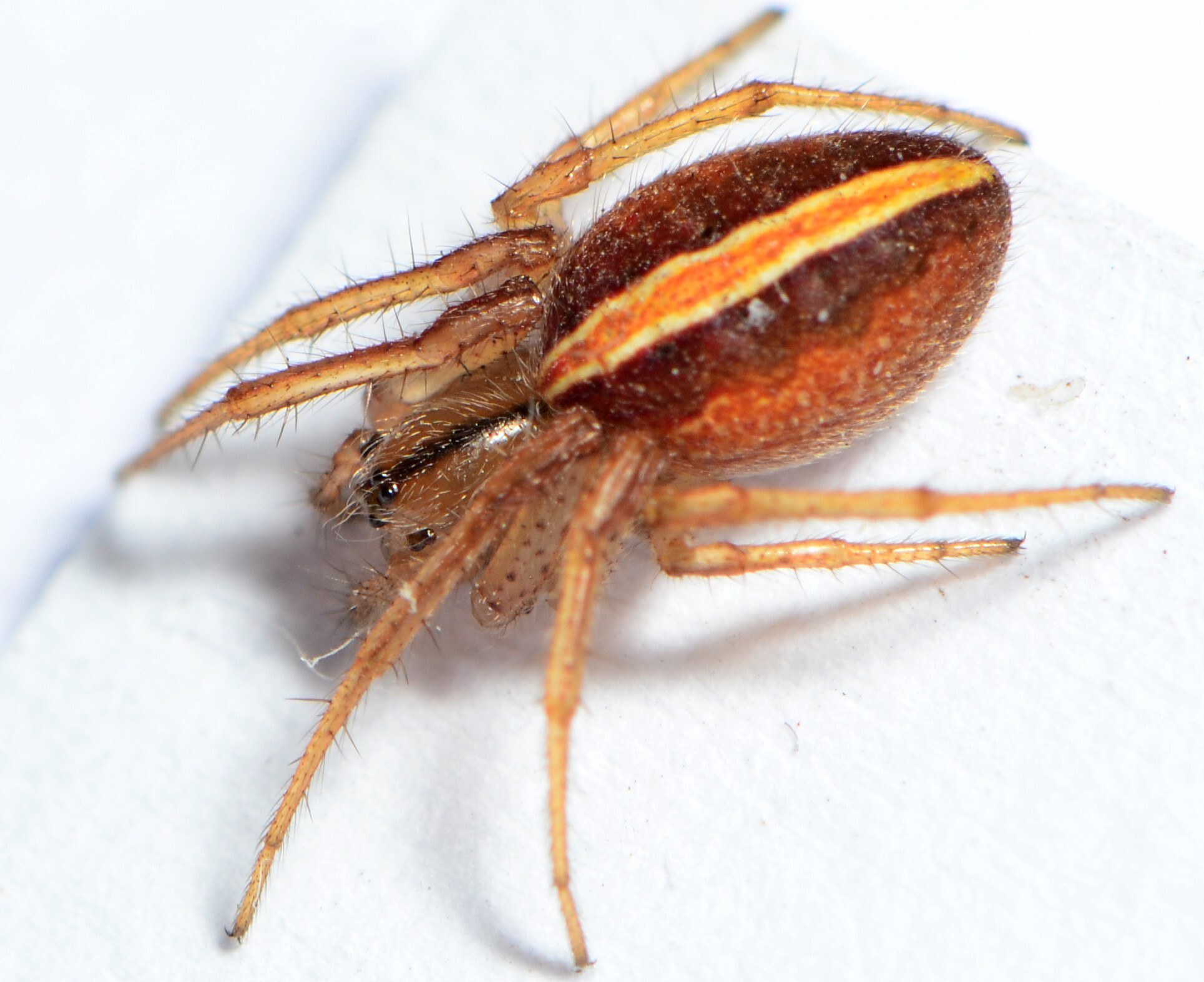
- Female
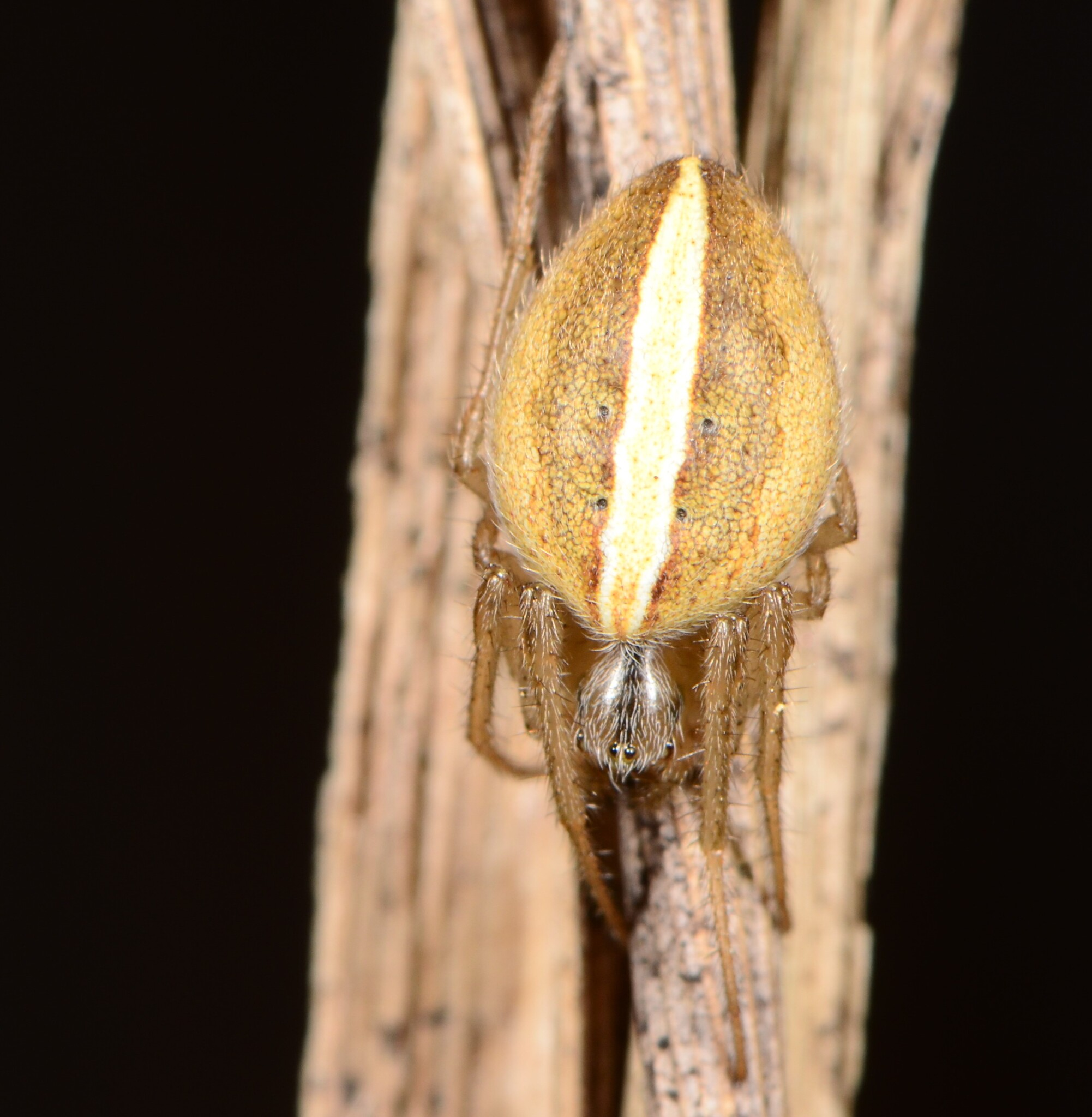
- Female

Scientific classification
- Kingdom: Animalia
- Phylum: Arthropoda
- Subphylum: Chelicerata
- Class: Arachnida
- Order: Araneae
- Infraorder: Araneomorphae
- Family: Araneidae
- Genus: Kilima
- Species: K. decens

Binomial name
- Kilima decens (Blackwall, 1866)

Synonyms
- Epeira decens Blackwall, 1866; Larinia mitis Pavesi, 1897

= Kilima decens =

Kilima Grass Orb-Web Spider

Species of spider

Kilima decens is a species of spider in the family Araneidae. It is found throughout Africa and is commonly known as the Kilima grass orb-web spider.

== Distribution ==
Kilima decens has a widespread distribution throughout Africa, including Central, East, Southern Africa, and the Seychelles. In South Africa, the species is found in all provinces.

== Habitat and ecology ==
The species has been sampled from Fynbos, Indian Ocean Coastal Belt, Grassland and Savanna biomes at altitudes ranging from 1 to 1,986 m above sea level. It was also sampled from potato and pumpkin fields.

Kilima decens is commonly found on grasses, where they blend in with their elongated, straw-coloured bodies. Their webs are made during the night and removed early in the morning. They rest during the day on nearby vegetation, usually grass. They prey on a wide variety of flying and jumping insects.

== Conservation ==
Kilima decens is listed as Least Concern by the South African National Biodiversity Institute due to its wide geographical range across all South African provinces. The species is protected in more than 15 reserves including Mkambathi Nature Reserve and Kruger National Park.

== Taxonomy ==
The species was originally described by John Blackwall in 1866 as Epeira decens from Tanzania. It was later transferred to the genus Kilima by Grasshoff in 1970. Both male and female specimens are known.
