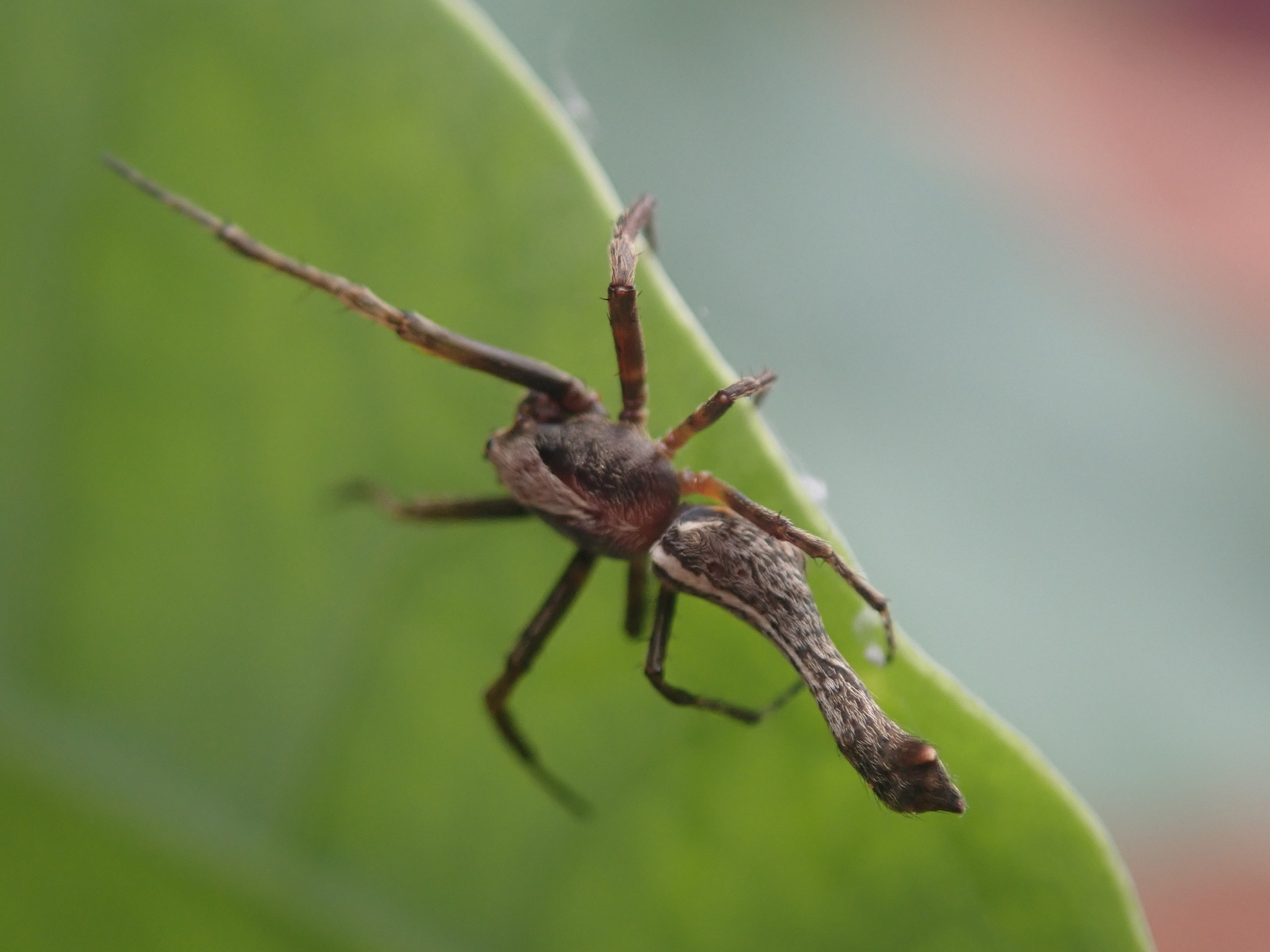
- Paraverrucosa neglecta

Scientific classification
- Kingdom: Animalia
- Phylum: Arthropoda
- Subphylum: Chelicerata
- Class: Arachnida
- Order: Araneae
- Infraorder: Araneomorphae
- Family: Araneidae
- Genus: Paraverrucosa; Mello-Leitão, 1939

Type species
- P. neglecta Mello-Leitão, 1939

Species
- 4, see text

= Paraverrucosa =

Genus of spiders

Paraverrucosa is a genus of orb-weaver spiders first described by Cândido Firmino de Mello-Leitão in 1939 to contain the type species, Paraverrucosa neglecta. Each of the four species have been moved around between Wagneriana, Edricus, and Verrucosa, but were all moved to this genus in 2020.

== Species ==
As of November 2026 it contains four species:

- P. eupalaestra (Mello-Leitão, 1943) – Brazil, Argentina
- P. heteracantha (Mello-Leitão, 1943) – Brazil, Argentina
- P. neglecta Mello-Leitão, 1939 – Trinidad to Argentina
- P. uzaga (Levi, 1991) – Brazil, Paraguay, Argentina

Formerly included:

- P. octospinosa Mello-Leitão, 1949 (Transferred to Wagneriana)
- P. uropygialis Mello-Leitão, 1944 (Transferred to Alpaida)
