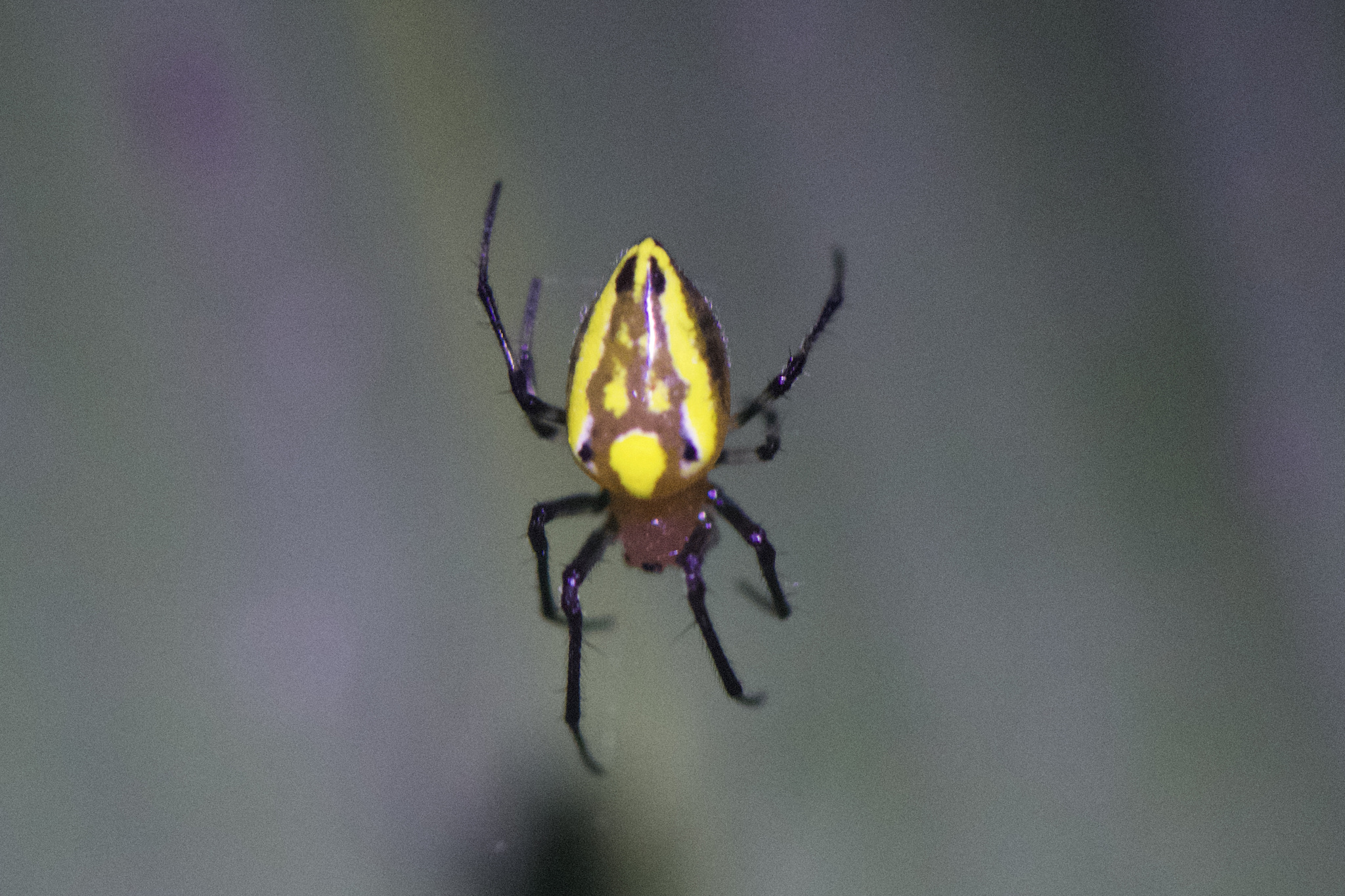

Scientific classification
- Kingdom: Animalia
- Phylum: Arthropoda
- Subphylum: Chelicerata
- Class: Arachnida
- Order: Araneae
- Infraorder: Araneomorphae
- Family: Araneidae
- Genus: Alpaida
- Species: A. tuonabo

Binomial name
- Alpaida tuonabo (Chamberlin & Ivie, 1936)

= Alpaida tuonabo =

Species of spider

Alpaida tuonabo is a species of spider from the genus Alpaida.

== Description ==
Juvenile specimens of A. tuonabo are pale red on their back and black on their belly. Ageing leads to the development of yellow spots on the thorax. Adults also have red-pale and black colouration, as well as noticeable yellow stripes covering most of the abdomen's dorsal side.
