= Alpaida variabilis =

- Male Alpaida variabilis portrait

Scientific classification
- Kingdom: Animalia
- Phylum: Arthropoda
- Subphylum: Chelicerata
- Class: Arachnida
- Order: Araneae
- Infraorder: Araneomorphae
- Family: Araneidae
- Genus: Alpaida
- Species: A. variabilis

Binomial name
- Alpaida variabilis (Keyserling, 1864)

Species of spider

Alpaida variabilis is a species of orb-weaver spider in the family Araneidae. It is native to the Neotropics, with a known distribution that includes Colombia and Argentina."NMBE - World Spider Catalog: Alpaida variabilis". wsc.nmbe.ch."Alpaida variabilis". iNaturalist.

== Description ==
Alpaida variabilis is a relatively small spider. As is characteristic of many members in this genus, they have a mostly glabrous (hairless) carapace that can range in coloration from orange and yellow to red, frequently exhibiting dark patterns.

== Range ==
This spider is found in Colombia and Argentina. May be found in other countries, although limited to the neotropics.

== Habitat ==
This species is closely associated with damp, water-dense environments. It is frequently found inhabiting the grasses and vegetation of wetlands.
