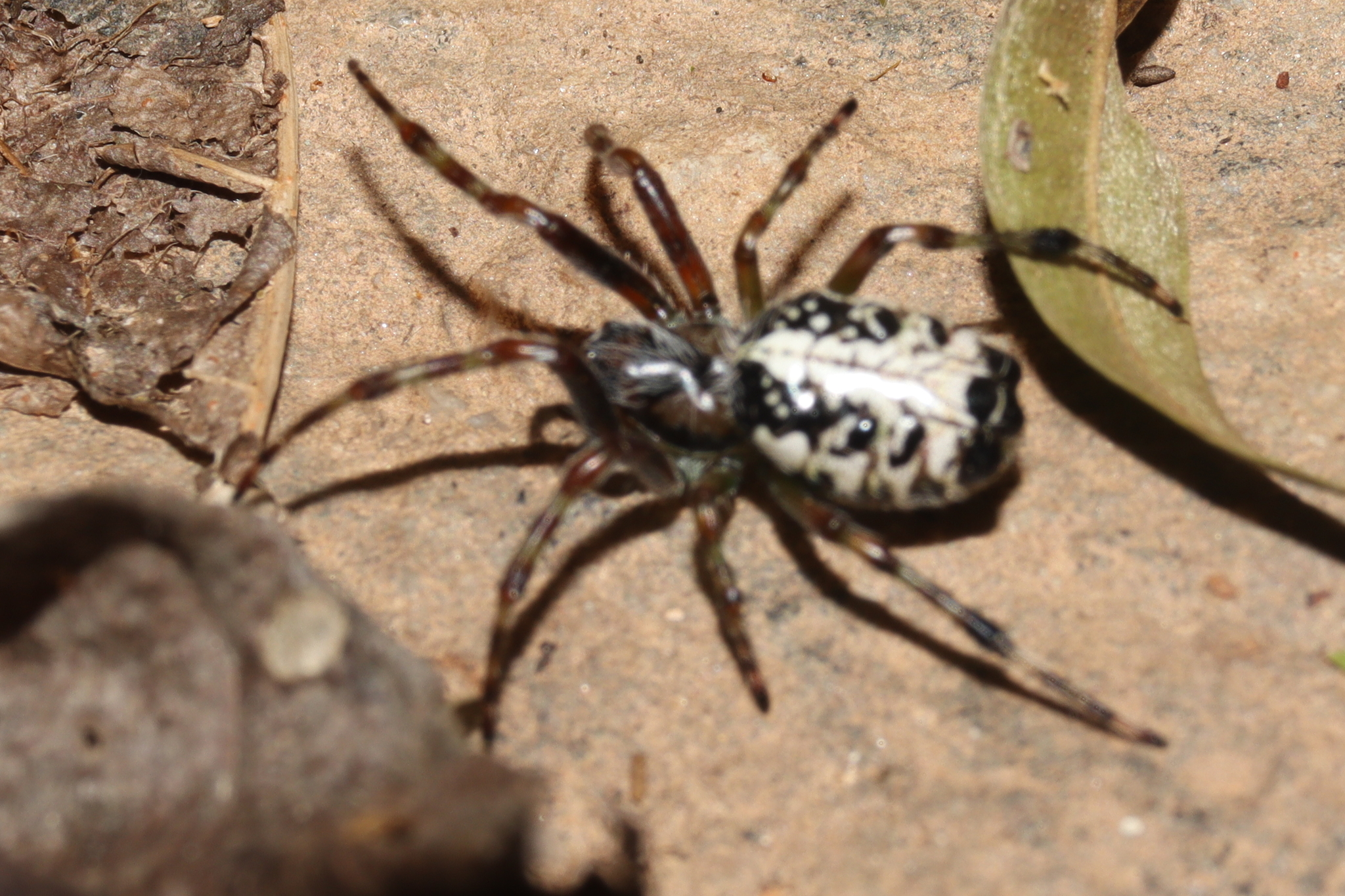

Scientific classification
- Kingdom: Animalia
- Phylum: Arthropoda
- Subphylum: Chelicerata
- Class: Arachnida
- Order: Araneae
- Infraorder: Araneomorphae
- Family: Araneidae
- Genus: Alpaida
- Species: A. truncata

Binomial name
- Alpaida truncata (Keyserling, 1865)

Synonyms
- Epeira truncata; Epeira elegantissima; Epeira cylindrica; Epeira nigropustulata; Araneus truncatus; Aranea nigropustulata; Araneus nigropustulatus; Edricus truncatus; Araneus mutatus; Pickardiana truncata; Epeiroides albonotatus; Edricus ensifer; Edricus truncata; Subedricus nigropustulatus; Alpaida nigropustulata

= Alpaida truncata =

Species of arachnid

Alpaida truncata is a species of spider from the genus Alpaida. The species was originally described by Eugen von Keyserling in 1865. The species is widely distributed from Mexico to Argentina.
