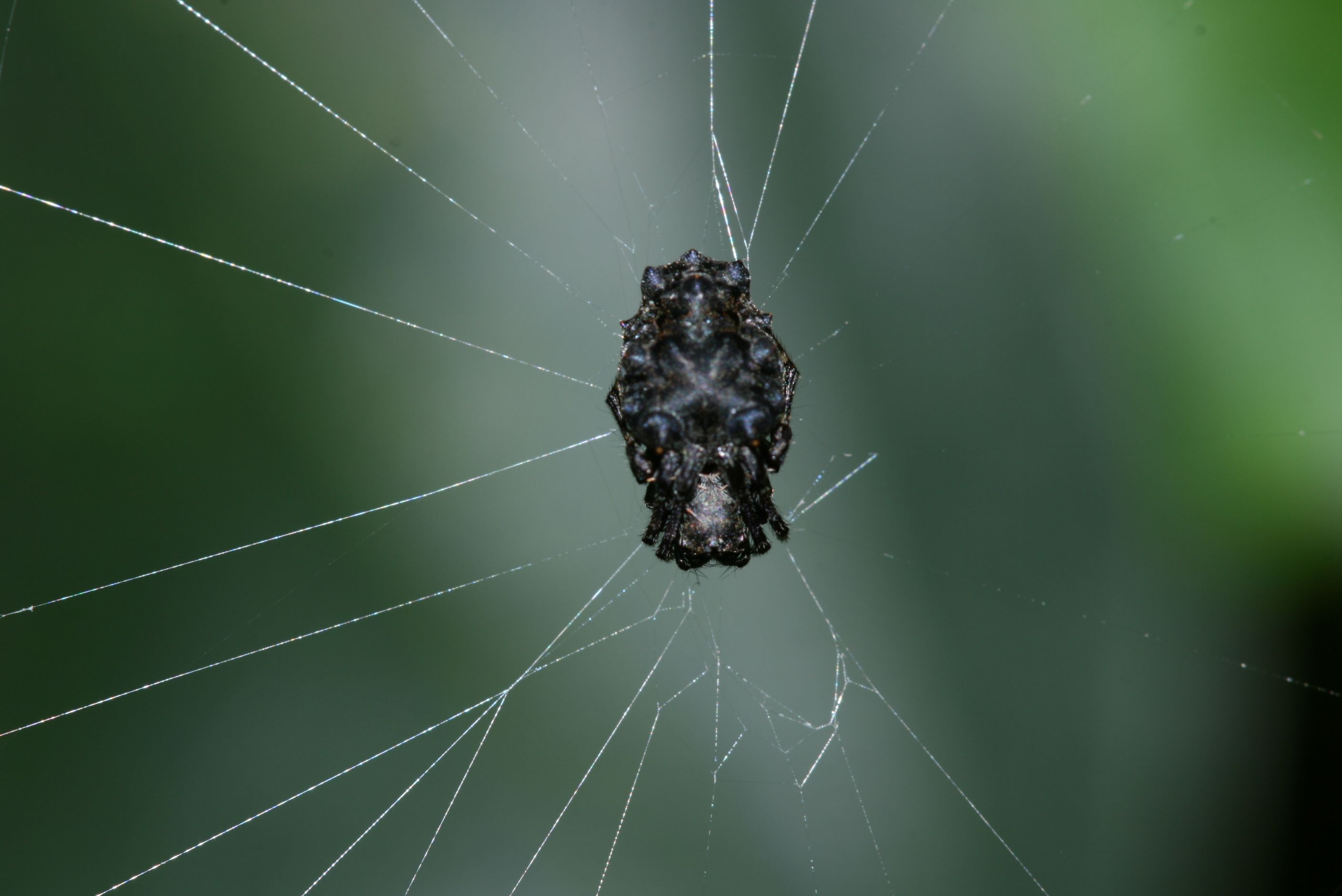

Scientific classification
- Domain: Eukaryota
- Kingdom: Animalia
- Phylum: Arthropoda
- Subphylum: Chelicerata
- Class: Arachnida
- Order: Araneae
- Infraorder: Araneomorphae
- Family: Araneidae
- Genus: Wagneriana
- Species: W. tauricornis

Binomial name
- Wagneriana tauricornis (O. P.-Cambridge, 1889)

= Wagneriana tauricornis =

Species of spider

Wagneriana tauricornis is a species of orb weaver in the family Araneidae. It is found in USA to Peru.
