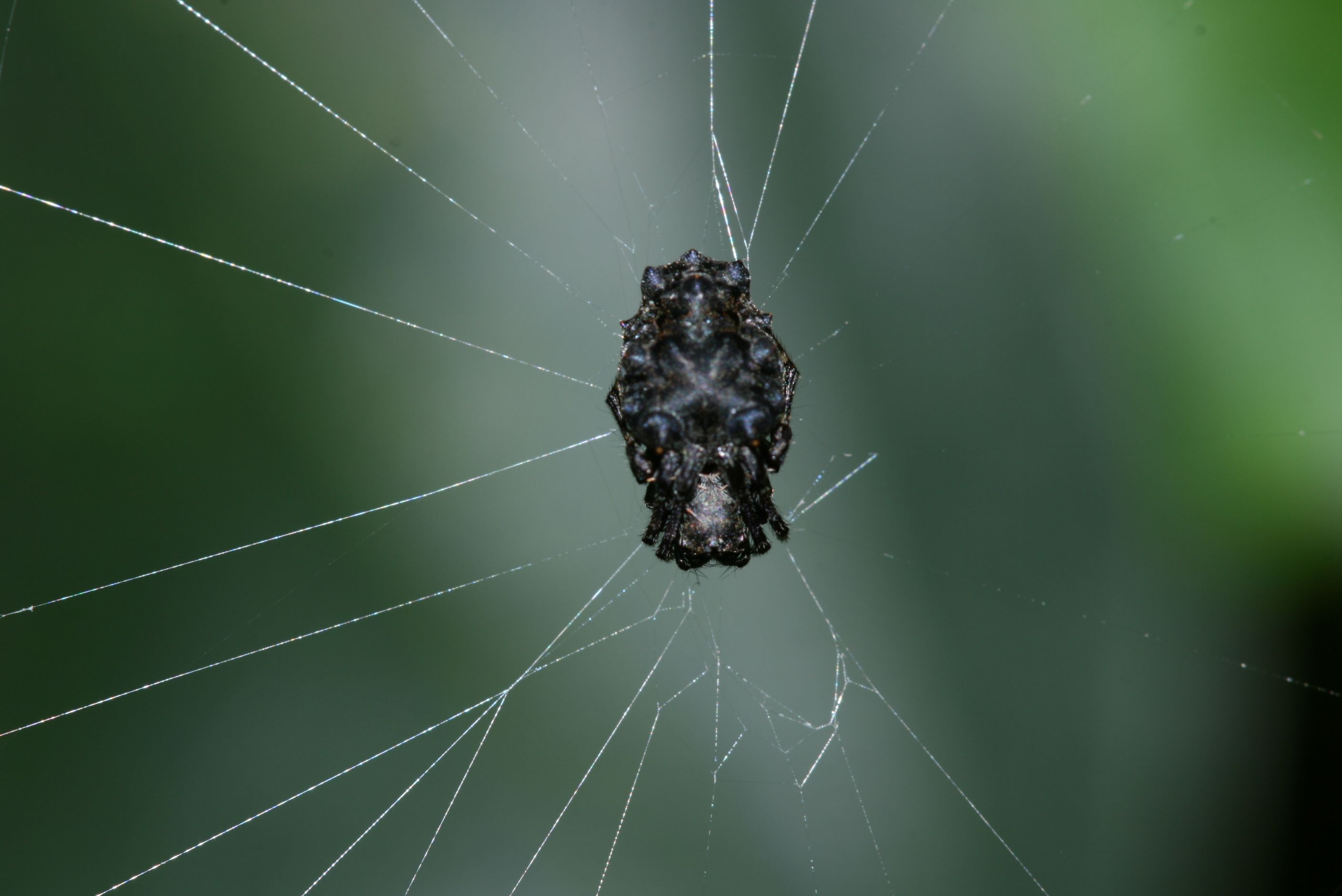
- Wagneriana tauricornis

Scientific classification
- Domain: Eukaryota
- Kingdom: Animalia
- Phylum: Arthropoda
- Subphylum: Chelicerata
- Class: Arachnida
- Order: Araneae
- Infraorder: Araneomorphae
- Family: Araneidae
- Genus: Wagneriana; F. O. Pickard-Cambridge, 1904

Type species
- W. tauricornis (O. Pickard-Cambridge, 1889)

Species
- 29, see text

Synonyms
- Anawixia Chamberlin, 1916

= Wagneriana =

Genus of spiders

Wagneriana is a genus of orb-weaver spiders first described by F. O. Pickard-Cambridge in 1904.

== Species ==
As of January 2022 it contains twenty-nine species:

- Wagneriana acrosomoides (Mello-Leitão, 1939) – Colombia to Brazil
- Wagneriana alma Levi, 1991 – Brazil
- Wagneriana atuna Levi, 1991 – Cuba, Costa Rica to Paraguay
- Wagneriana carinata F. O. Pickard-Cambridge, 1904 – Guatemala
- Wagneriana cobella Levi, 1991 – Colombia, Venezuela
- Wagneriana dimastophora (Mello-Leitão, 1940) – Brazil
- Wagneriana eldorado Levi, 1991 – Argentina
- Wagneriana hassleri Levi, 1991 – Brazil, Guyana
- Wagneriana huanca Levi, 1991 – Peru
- Wagneriana jacaza Levi, 1991 – Colombia, Brazil
- Wagneriana jelskii (Taczanowski, 1873) – Trinidad to Bolivia
- Wagneriana juquia Levi, 1991 – Brazil, Paraguay, Argentina
- Wagneriana lechuza Levi, 1991 – Peru, Brazil
- Wagneriana madrejon Levi, 1991 – Paraguay
- Wagneriana maseta Levi, 1991 – Colombia to Ecuador and Brazil
- Wagneriana neblina Levi, 1991 – Venezuela
- Wagneriana pakitza Levi, 1991 – Peru
- Wagneriana roraima Levi, 1991 – Brazil
- Wagneriana silvae Levi, 1991 – Peru, Bolivia
- Wagneriana spicata (O. Pickard-Cambridge, 1889) – Mexico to Costa Rica
- Wagneriana taboga Levi, 1991 – Panama to Venezuela, Brazil
- Wagneriana taim Levi, 1991 – Brazil
- Wagneriana tauricornis (O. Pickard-Cambridge, 1889) (type) – USA to Peru
- Wagneriana tayos Levi, 1991 – Colombia to Peru
- Wagneriana transitoria (C. L. Koch, 1839) – Venezuela to Argentina
- Wagneriana undecimtuberculata (Keyserling, 1865) – Panama to Peru
- Wagneriana vallenuevo Alayón, 2011 – Hispaniola (Dominican Rep.)
- Wagneriana vegas Levi, 1991 – Cuba, Hispaniola
- Wagneriana yacuma Levi, 1991 – Brazil, Bolivia
