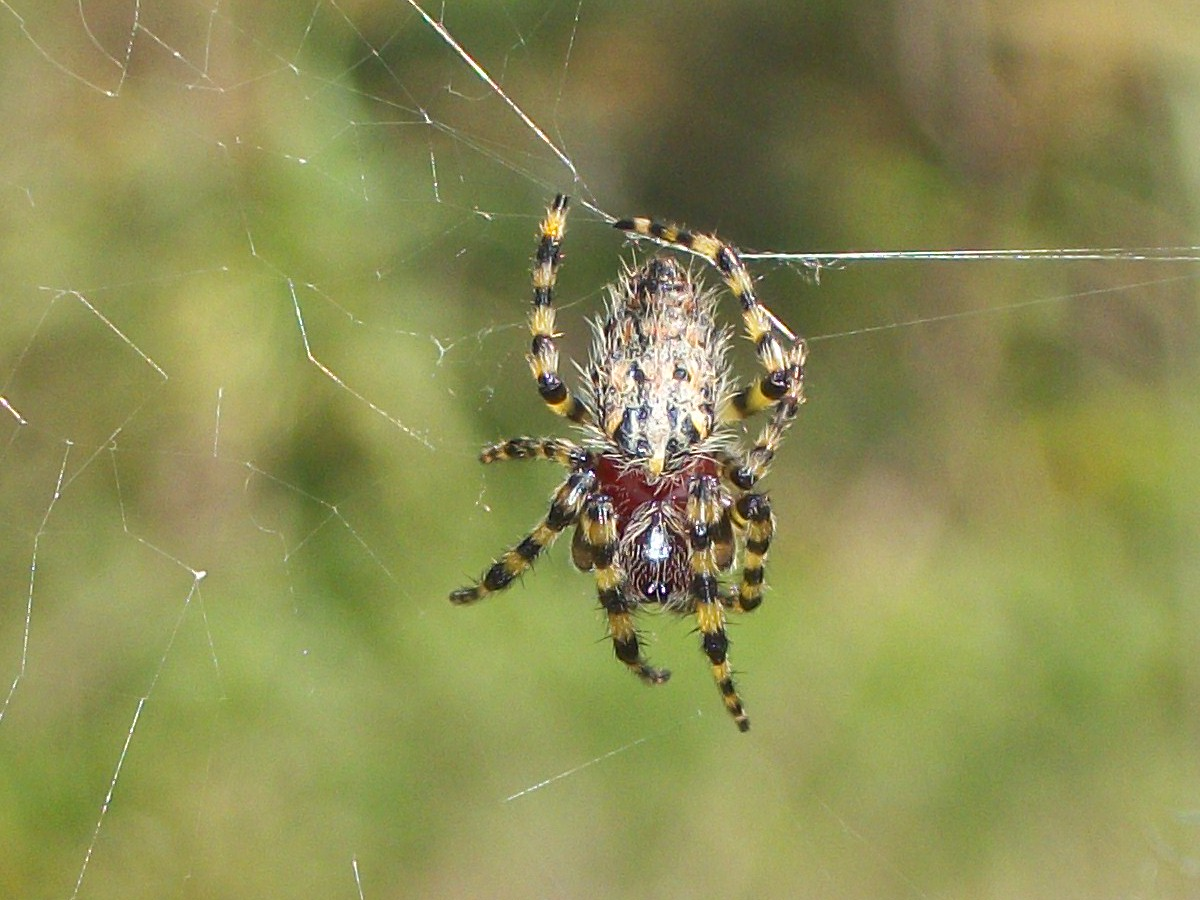
- Alpaida alticeps

Scientific classification
- Kingdom: Animalia
- Phylum: Arthropoda
- Subphylum: Chelicerata
- Class: Arachnida
- Order: Araneae
- Infraorder: Araneomorphae
- Family: Araneidae
- Genus: Alpaida; O. Pickard-Cambridge, 1889

Type species
- A. conica O. Pickard-Cambridge, 1889

Species
- 168, see text

Synonyms
- Lariniacantha; Parepeira; Pickardiana; Subaraneus; Subedricus

= Alpaida (spider) =

Genus of spiders

Alpaida is a genus of South American orb-weaver spiders first described by Octavius Pickard-Cambridge in 1889.

== Species ==
As of November 2026 it contains 168 species:

- A. acuta (Keyserling, 1865) — Panama to Argentina
- A. albocincta (Mello-Leitão, 1945) — Venezuela to Argentina
- A. almada Levi, 1988 — Brazil
- A. alticeps (Keyserling, 1879) — Brazil, Paraguay
- A. alto Levi, 1988 — Paraguay
- A. alvarengai Levi, 1988 — Brazil
- A. amambay Levi, 1988 — Colombia, Paraguay
- A. anchicaya Levi, 1988 — Colombia
- A. angra Levi, 1988 — Brazil
- A. antonio Levi, 1988 — Brazil, Guyana, French Guiana
- A. arvoredo Buckup & Rodrigues, 2011 — Brazil
- A. atomaria (Simon, 1895) — Brazil, Argentina
- A. audiberti Dierkens, 2014 — French Guiana
- A. banos Levi, 1988 — Colombia, Ecuador, French Guiana
- A. batman Baptista, Castanheira & Schinelli, 2025 — Brazil
- A. biasii Levi, 1988 — Brazil
- A. bicornuta (Taczanowski, 1878) — Costa Rica to Argentina
- A. bischoffi Levi, 1988 — Brazil
- A. boa Levi, 1988 — Brazil, French Guiana
- A. boraceia Levi, 1988 — Brazil
- A. cachimbo Levi, 1988 — Brazil
- A. cali Levi, 1988 — Colombia
- A. calotypa (Chamberlin, 1916) — Peru
- A. canela Levi, 1988 — Brazil
- A. canoa Levi, 1988 — Brazil
- A. capixaba Bapista, Castanheira & Schinelli, 2025 — Brazil
- A. caramba Buckup & Rodrigues, 2011 — Brazil
- A. carminea (Taczanowski, 1878) — Peru, Brazil, Paraguay, Argentina
- A. chaco Levi, 1988 — Paraguay
- A. championi (O. Pickard-Cambridge, 1889) — Guatemala to Colombia
- A. chapada Levi, 1988 — Brazil
- A. chickeringi Levi, 1988 — Panama to Brazil
- A. cisneros Levi, 1988 — Colombia, Ecuador
- A. citrina (Keyserling, 1892) — Brazil, Argentina
- A. clarindoi Nogueira & Dias, 2015 — Brazil
- A. coati Baptista, Castanheira, do Prado & Assunção-Oliveira, 2025 — Brazil
- A. conica O. Pickard-Cambridge, 1889 — Panama
- A. constant Levi, 1988 — Brazil
- A. coroico Levi, 1988 — Bolivia
- A. costai Levi, 1988 — Argentina
- A. cuiaba Levi, 1988 — Brazil
- A. cuyabeno Levi, 1988 — Colombia, Ecuador
- A. darlingtoni Levi, 1988 — Colombia
- A. deborae Levi, 1988 — Brazil, Suriname, French Guiana
- A. delicata (Keyserling, 1892) — Colombia, Peru, Bolivia, Brazil, French Guiana
- A. dominica Levi, 1988 — Lesser Antilles
- A. eberhardi Levi, 1988 — Colombia
- A. elegantula (Archer, 1965) — Martinique
- A. ericae Levi, 1988 — Brazil, Argentina
- A. erythrothorax (Taczanowski, 1873) — French Guiana, Brazil
- A. gallardoi Levi, 1988 — Brazil, Paraguay, Argentina
- A. gracia Levi, 1988 — Argentina
- A. graphica (O. Pickard-Cambridge, 1889) — Mexico to Panama
- A. grayi (Blackwall, 1863) — Brazil, Paraguay, Uruguay, Argentina
- A. guimaraes Levi, 1988 — Brazil, Guyana
- A. gurupi Levi, 1988 — Colombia, Brazil
- A. guto Abrahim & Bonaldo, 2008 — Brazil
- A. haligera (Archer, 1971) — Peru, Venezuela
- A. hartliebi Levi, 1988 — Brazil
- A. hoffmanni Levi, 1988 — Brazil, Paraguay
- A. holmbergi Levi, 1988 — Argentina
- A. iguazu Levi, 1988 — Brazil, Argentina
- A. imperatrix Baptista, Castanheira & do Prado, 2018 — Brazil
- A. imperialis Baptista, Castanheira & do Prado, 2018 — Brazil
- A. iquitos Levi, 1988 — Peru, Ecuador, Brazil, French Guiana
- A. itacolomi Santos & Santos, 2010 — Brazil
- A. itapua Levi, 1988 — Paraguay
- A. itauba Levi, 1988 — Brazil, Argentina
- A. jacaranda Levi, 1988 — Brazil
- A. jequitiba Baptista, Castanheira & Oliveira, 2025 — Brazil
- A. kartabo Levi, 1988 — Guyana
- A. kayapo Pamplona, Bonaldo & Pantoja, 2025 — Brazil
- A. keyserlingi Levi, 1988 — Brazil
- A. kochalkai Levi, 1988 — Colombia
- A. latro (Fabricius, 1775) — Brazil, Uruguay, Paraguay, Argentina
- A. leucogramma (White, 1841) — Panama to Argentina
- A. levii Saturnino, Rodrigues & Bonaldo, 2015 — Brazil
- A. linhares Baptista, Wermelinger-Moreira, 2025 — Brazil
- A. lomba Levi, 1988 — Brazil
- A. losamigos Deza & Andía, 2014 — Peru
- A. lubinae Levi, 1988 — Venezuela
- A. machala Levi, 1988 — Ecuador
- A. madeira Levi, 1988 — Brazil
- A. manicata Levi, 1988 — Colombia, Brazil
- A. marista Baptista, Castanheira & do Prado, 2018 — Brazil
- A. marmorata (Taczanowski, 1873) — Ecuador, Peru, French Guiana
- A. marta Levi, 1988 — Colombia
- A. mato Levi, 1988 — Brazil
- A. mendensis Baptista, Castanheira & do Prado, 2018 — Brazil
- A. moata (Chamberlin & Ivie, 1936) — Panama, Colombia
- A. moka Levi, 1988 — Peru, Brazil, Bolivia
- A. monzon Levi, 1988 — Peru
- A. morro Levi, 1988 — Brazil
- A. muco Levi, 1988 — Colombia
- A. murtinho Levi, 1988 — Brazil
- A. nadleri Levi, 1988 — Venezuela
- A. nancho Levi, 1988 — Peru
- A. narino Levi, 1988 — Colombia
- A. natal Levi, 1988 — Brazil
- A. navicula (L. Koch, 1871) — Brazil
- A. negro Levi, 1988 — Colombia, Brazil
- A. nigrofrenata (Simon, 1895) — Brazil
- A. niveosigillata (Mello-Leitão, 1941) — Colombia, Ecuador
- A. nonoai Levi, 1988 — Brazil
- A. octolobata Levi, 1988 — Brazil, Argentina
- A. oliverioi (Soares & Camargo, 1948) — Brazil
- A. orgaos Levi, 1988 — Brazil
- A. oyapockensis Dierkens, 2014 — French Guiana
- A. pedro Levi, 1988 — Brazil
- A. penca Deza & Andía, 2014 — Peru
- A. picchu Levi, 1988 — Peru
- A. pretiosa Baptista, Castanheira & Wermelinger-Moreira, 2025 — Brazil, Guyana
- A. quadrilorata (Simon, 1897) — Brazil, Paraguay, Uruguay, Argentina
- A. queremal Levi, 1988 — Colombia
- A. regua Baptista, Castanheira, Schinelli & Assunção-Oliveira, 2025 — Brazil
- A. rioja Levi, 1988 — Brazil, Argentina
- A. rosa Levi, 1988 — Brazil, Argentina
- A. rossi Levi, 1988 — Peru, Brazil
- A. rostratula (Keyserling, 1892) — Brazil, Argentina
- A. rubellula (Keyserling, 1892) — Brazil, Paraguay, Argentina
- A. sandrei (Simon, 1895) — Brazil
- A. santosi Levi, 1988 — Brazil
- A. schneblei Levi, 1988 — Colombia
- A. scriba (Mello-Leitão, 1940) — Brazil
- A. septemmammata (O. Pickard-Cambridge, 1889) — Mexico to Argentina
- A. serrana Baptista, Castanheira & Oliveira, 2025 — Brazil
- A. sevilla Levi, 1988 — Colombia
- A. silencio Levi, 1988 — Colombia
- A. simla Levi, 1988 — Trinidad, Brazil
- A. sobradinho Levi, 1988 — Brazil
- A. sooretama Baptista, Castanheira & do Prado, 2025 — Brazil
- A. sulphurea (Taczanowski, 1873) — French Guiana
- A. sumare Levi, 1988 — Brazil
- A. tabula (Simon, 1895) — Guyana to Bolivia
- A. taquara Castanheira & Baptista, 2025 — Brazil
- A. tayos Levi, 1988 — Ecuador, Peru, Brazil, Guyana, French Guiana
- A. teresinha Braga-Pereira & Santos, 2013 — Brazil
- A. thaxteri Levi, 1988 — Trinidad
- A. tijuca Levi, 1988 — Brazil
- A. toninho Braga-Pereira & Santos, 2013 — Brazil
- A. tonze Santos & Santos, 2010 — Brazil
- A. trilineata (Taczanowski, 1878) — Peru
- A. trispinosa (Keyserling, 1892) — Panama to Argentina
- A. truncata (Keyserling, 1865) — Mexico to Argentina
  - Alpaida t. obscura (Caporiacco, 1948) — Guyana
  - Alpaida t. sexmaculata (Caporiacco, 1948) — Guyana
- A. tukano Pamplona, Bonaldo & Pantoja, 2025 — Brazil
- A. tullgreni (Caporiacco, 1955) — Venezuela
- A. tuonabo (Chamberlin & Ivie, 1936) — Panama
- A. tupinamda Pamplona, Bonaldo & Pantoja, 2025 — Brazil
- A. turrigera (Schenkel, 1953) — Venezula, Brazil
- A. uropygialis (Mello-Leitão, 1944) — Argentina
- A. urucuca Levi, 1988 — Brazil
- A. utcuyacu Levi, 1988 — Peru
- A. utiariti Levi, 1988 — Brazil
- A. vanzolinii Levi, 1988 — Peru, Brazil, Argentina
- A. variabilis (Keyserling, 1864) — Colombia
- A. venger Castanheira & Baptista, 2015 — Brazil
- A. veniliae (Keyserling, 1865) — Panama to Argentina
- A. vera Levi, 1988 — Brazil
- A. versicolor (Keyserling, 1877) — Brazil, Paraguay, Uruguay, Argentina
- A. wenzeli (Simon, 1898) — St. Vincent
- A. weyrauchi Levi, 1988 — Peru
- A. yanayacu Saturnino, Rodrigues & Bonaldo, 2015 — Brazil
- A. yotoco Levi, 1988 — Colombia
- A. yucuma Levi, 1988 — Brazil
- A. yungas Levi, 1988 — Bolivia
- A. yuto Levi, 1988 — Paraguay, Argentina
