= List of Araneidae species: N–Z =

This page lists all described species of the spider family Araneidae as of Dec. 21, 2016, that start with letters N through Z.

== Nemoscolus ==
Nemoscolus Simon, 1895

- Nemoscolus affinis Lessert, 1933 — Congo
- Nemoscolus caudifer Strand, 1906 — West Africa
- Nemoscolus cotti Lessert, 1933 — Mozambique
- Nemoscolus elongatus Lawrence, 1947 — South Africa
- Nemoscolus kolosvaryi Caporiacco, 1947 — Uganda
- Nemoscolus lateplagiatis Simon, 1907 — Guinea-Bissau
- Nemoscolus laurae (Simon, 1868) (type species) — Western Mediterranean
- Nemoscolus niger Caporiacco, 1936 — Libya
- Nemoscolus obscurus Simon, 1897 — South Africa
- Nemoscolus rectifrons Roewer, 1961 — Senegal
- Nemoscolus semilugens Denis, 1966 — Libya
- Nemoscolus tubicola (Simon, 1887) — South Africa
- Nemoscolus turricola Berland, 1933 — Mali
- Nemoscolus vigintipunctatus Simon, 1897 — South Africa
- Nemoscolus waterloti Berland, 1920 — Madagascar

== Nemosinga ==
Nemosinga Caporiacco, 1947

- Nemosinga atra Caporiacco, 1947 (type species) — Tanzania
  - Nemosinga atra bimaculata Caporiacco, 1947 — Tanzania
- Nemosinga strandi Caporiacco, 1947 — Tanzania

== Nemospiza ==
Nemospiza Simon, 1903

- Nemospiza conspicillata Simon, 1903 — South Africa

== Neogea ==
Neogea Levi, 1983

- Neogea egregia (Kulczynski, 1911) (type species) — New Guinea
- Neogea nocticolor (Thorell, 1887) — India to Sumatra
- Neogea yunnanensis Yin et al., 1990 — China

== Neoscona ==
Neoscona Simon, 1864

- Neoscona achine (Simon, 1906) — India, China
- Neoscona adianta (Walckenaer, 1802) — Palearctic
  - Neoscona adianta persecta (Schenkel, 1936) — China
- Neoscona alberti (Strand, 1913) — Central, Southern Africa
- Neoscona albertoi Barrion-Dupo, 2008 — Philippines
- Neoscona aldinei Barrion-Dupo, 2008 — Philippines
- Neoscona amamiensis Tanikawa, 1998 — Japan
- Neoscona ampoyae Barrion-Dupo, 2008 — Philippines
- Neoscona angulatula (Schenkel, 1937) — Madagascar, Aldabra, Kenya
- Neoscona arabesca (Walckenaer, 1841) (type species) — North, Central America, West Indies
- Neoscona bengalensis Tikader & Bal, 1981 — India, Pakistan
- Neoscona bihumpi Patel, 1988 — India
- Neoscona biswasi Bhandari & Gajbe, 2001 — India
- Neoscona blondeli (Simon, 1886) — Africa
- Neoscona bomdilaensis Biswas & Biswas, 2006 — India
- Neoscona bucheti (Lessert, 1930) — Congo
  - Neoscona bucheti avakubiensis (Lessert, 1930) — Congo
  - Neoscona bucheti flexuosa (Lessert, 1930) — Congo, Yemen
- Neoscona byzanthina (Pavesi, 1876) — France, Turkey
- Neoscona cereolella (Strand, 1907) — Congo, East Africa, Madagascar
  - Neoscona cereolella setaceola (Strand, 1913) — Central Africa
- Neoscona cheesmanae (Berland, 1938) — New Hebrides
- Neoscona chiarinii (Pavesi, 1883) — West, Central, East Africa
- Neoscona chongzuoensis Zhang & Zhang, 2011 — China
- Neoscona chrysanthusi Tikader & Bal, 1981 — Bhutan, India, Pakistan
- Neoscona crucifera (Lucas, 1838) — North America, Canary Islands, Madeira, Hawaii
- Neoscona dhruvai Patel & Nigam, 1994 — India
- Neoscona dhumani Patel & Reddy, 1993 — India
- Neoscona domiciliorum (Hentz, 1847) — USA
- Neoscona dostinikea Barrion & Litsinger, 1995 — Philippines
- Neoscona dyali Gajbe, 2004 — India
- Neoscona facundoi Barrion-Dupo, 2008 — Philippines
- Neoscona flavescens Zhang & Zhang, 2011 — China
- Neoscona goliath (Benoit, 1963) — Ivory Coast
- Neoscona govindai Biswas & Raychaudhuri, 2013 - Bangladesh
- Neoscona hirta (C. L. Koch, 1844) — Central, Southern Africa
- Neoscona holmi (Schenkel, 1953) — China, Korea
- Neoscona huzaifi Mukhtar, 2012 — Pakistan
- Neoscona jinghongensis Yin et al., 1990 — China
- Neoscona kabiri Biswas & Raychaudhuri, 2013 - Bangladesh
- Neoscona kisangani Grasshoff, 1986 — Congo
- Neoscona kivuensis Grasshoff, 1986 — Congo
- Neoscona kunmingensis Yin et al., 1990 — China
- Neoscona lactea (Saito, 1933) — Taiwan
- Neoscona leucaspis (Schenkel, 1963) — China
- Neoscona lipana Barrion-Dupo, 2008 — Philippines
- Neoscona lotan Levy, 2007 — Israel
- Neoscona maculaticeps (L. Koch, 1871) — Japan, Samoa
- Neoscona marcanoi Levi, 1993 — Cuba, Hispaniola
- Neoscona mellotteei (Simon, 1895) — China, Korea, Taiwan, Japan
- Neoscona menghaiensis Yin et al., 1990 — China
- Neoscona molemensis Tikader & Bal, 1981 — Bangladesh, India to Philippines, Indonesia
- Neoscona moreli (Vinson, 1863) — Cuba to Argentina, Africa to Seychelles
- Neoscona mukerjei Tikader, 1980 — India, Pakistan
- Neoscona multiplicans (Chamberlin, 1924) — China, Korea, Japan
- Neoscona murthyi Patel & Reddy, 1990 — India
- Neoscona nasidae Biswas & Raychaudhuri, 2013 - Bangladesh
- Neoscona nautica (L. Koch, 1875) — Cosmotropical
- Neoscona novella (Simon, 1907) — Bioko
- Neoscona oaxacensis (Keyserling, 1864) — USA to Peru, Galapagos Islands
- Neoscona odites (Simon, 1906) — India
- Neoscona oriemindoroana Barrion & Litsinger, 1995 — Philippines
- Neoscona orientalis (Urquhart, 1887) — New Zealand
- Neoscona orizabensis F. O. P.-Cambridge, 1904 — Mexico
- Neoscona parambikulamensis Patel, 2003 — India
- Neoscona pavida (Simon, 1906) — India, Pakistan, China
- Neoscona penicillipes (Karsch, 1879) — West, Central Africa
- Neoscona platnicki Gajbe & Gajbe, 2001 — India
- Neoscona plebeja (L. Koch, 1871) — Fiji, Tonga, Funafuti, Rapa
- Neoscona polyspinipes Yin et al., 1990 — China
- Neoscona pratensis (Hentz, 1847) — USA, Canada
- Neoscona pseudonautica Yin et al., 1990 — China, Korea
- Neoscona pseudoscylla (Schenkel, 1953) — China
- Neoscona punctigera (Doleschall, 1857) — Reunion to Japan
- Neoscona quadrigibbosa Grasshoff, 1986 — Central, Southern Africa
- Neoscona quincasea Roberts, 1983 — Central, Southern Africa, Aldabra
- Neoscona rahamani Biswas & Raychaudhuri, 2013 - Bangladesh
- Neoscona rapta (Thorell, 1899) — Africa
- Neoscona raydakensis Saha et al., 1995 — India
- Neoscona rufipalpis (Lucas, 1858) — Africa, St. Helena, Cape Verde Islands, Yemen
  - Neoscona rufipalpis buettnerana (Strand, 1908) — Cameroon, Togo
- Neoscona sanghi Gajbe, 2004 — India
- Neoscona sanjivani Gajbe, 2004 — India
- Neoscona scylla (Karsch, 1879) — Russia, China, Korea, Japan
- Neoscona scylloides (Bösenberg & Strand, 1906) — China, Korea, Taiwan, Japan
- Neoscona semilunaris (Karsch, 1879) — China, Korea, Japan
- Neoscona shillongensis Tikader & Bal, 1981 — India, Pakistan, China
- Neoscona simoni Grasshoff, 1986 — Central Africa
- Neoscona sinhagadensis (Tikader, 1975) — India, Pakistan, China
- Neoscona sodom Levy, 1998 — Israel
- Neoscona stanleyi (Lessert, 1930) — Congo
- Neoscona subfusca (C. L. Koch, 1837) — Old World
  - Neoscona subfusca alboplagiata Caporiacco, 1947 — Tanzania
  - Neoscona subfusca pallidior (Thorell, 1899) — Bioko
- Neoscona subpullata (Bösenberg & Strand, 1906) — China, Korea, Japan
- Neoscona tedgenica (Bakhvalov, 1978) — Central Asia
- Neoscona theisi (Walckenaer, 1841) — India, China to Pacific Islands
  - Neoscona theisi carbonaria (Simon, 1909) — Vietnam
  - Neoscona theisi feisiana (Strand, 1911) — Caroline Islands
  - Neoscona theisi savesi (Simon, 1880) — New Caledonia
  - Neoscona theisi theisiella (Tullgren, 1910) — West, Central, East Africa, Yemen
  - Neoscona theisi triangulifera (Thorell, 1878) — New Guinea
- Neoscona tianmenensis Yin et al., 1990 — China, Korea
- Neoscona triangula (Keyserling, 1864) — Cape Verde to India
  - Neoscona triangula mensamontella (Strand, 1907) — Madagascar
- Neoscona triramusa Yin & Zhao, 1994 — China
- Neoscona ujavalai Reddy & Patel, 1992 — India
- Neoscona usbonga Barrion & Litsinger, 1995 — Philippines
- Neoscona utahana (Chamberlin, 1919) — USA, Mexico
- Neoscona vigilans (Blackwall, 1865) — Africa to Philippines, New Guinea
- Neoscona xiquanensis Barrion, Barrion-Dupo & Heong, 2013 - China
- Neoscona xishanensis Yin et al., 1990 — China
- Neoscona yadongensis Yin et al., 1990 — China
- Neoscona yptinika Barrion & Litsinger, 1995 — India, Philippines
- Neoscona zhui Zhang & Zhang, 2011 — China

== Nephila ==
Nephila Leach, 1815

- Nephila antipodiana (Walckenaer, 1841) — China, Philippines to New Guinea, Solomon Islands, Queensland
- Nephila clavata L. Koch, 1878 — India to Japan
  - Nephila clavata caerulescens Ono, 2011 — Japan
- Nephila clavipes (Linnaeus, 1767) — USA to Argentina, São Tomé
  - Nephila clavipes fasciculata (De Geer, 1778) — USA to Argentina
  - Nephila clavipes vespucea (Walckenaer, 1841) — Argentina
- Nephila comorana Strand, 1916 — Comoro Islands
- Nephila constricta Karsch, 1879 — Tropical Africa
- Nephila cornuta (Pallas, 1772) — Guyana
- Nephila dirangensis Biswas & Biswas, 2006 — India
- Nephila edulis (Labillardière, 1799) — Australia, New Guinea, New Caledonia, New Zealand
- Nephila fenestrata Thorell, 1859 — South Africa
  - Nephila fenestrata fuelleborni Dahl, 1912 — East Africa
  - Nephila fenestrata venusta (Blackwall, 1865) — West, Central Africa
- Nephila inaurata (Walckenaer, 1841) — Mauritius, Rodriguez, Réunion
  - Nephila inaurata madagascariensis (Vinson, 1863) — South Africa to Seychelles
- Nephila komaci Kuntner & Coddington, 2009 — South Africa, Madagascar
- Nephila kuhlii (Doleschall, 1859) — India to Sulawesi
- Nephila laurinae Thorell, 1881 — China to Solomon Islands
- Nephila pakistaniensis Ghafoor & Beg, 2002 — Pakistan
- Nephila pilipes (Fabricius, 1793) — India to China, Philippines, northeastern Australia
  - Nephila pilipes malagassa (Strand, 1907) — Madagascar
- Nephila plumipes (Latreille, 1804) — Indonesia, New Guinea, Australia, New Caledonia, Vanuatu, Solomon Islands, New Ireland
- Nephila robusta Tikader, 1962 — India
- Nephila senegalensis (Walckenaer, 1841) — West Africa to Ethiopia
  - Nephila senegalensis annulata (Thorell, 1859) — Namibia, South Africa
  - Nephila senegalensis bragantina Brito Capello, 1867 — Central Africa
  - Nephila senegalensis hildebrandti Dahl, 1912 — Madagascar
  - Nephila senegalensis huebneri Dahl, 1912 — East Africa
  - Nephila senegalensis keyserlingi (Blackwall, 1865) — Congo, East Africa
  - Nephila senegalensis nyikae Pocock, 1898 — East Africa
  - Nephila senegalensis schweinfurthi Simon, 1890 — Yemen
- Nephila sexpunctata Giebel, 1867 — Brazil, Paraguay, Argentina
- Nephila sumptuosa Gerstäcker, 1873 — East Africa, Socotra
- Nephila tetragnathoides (Walckenaer, 1841) — Fiji, Tonga, Niue
- Nephila turneri Blackwall, 1833 — West, Central Africa
  - Nephila turneri orientalis Benoit, 1964 — Central, East Africa
- Nephila vitiana (Walckenaer, 1847) — Indonesia, Sulawesi, to Fiji, Tonga

== Nephilengys ==
Nephilengys L. Koch, 1872

- Nephilengys malabarensis (Walckenaer, 1841) — India to China, Philippines, Japan, Ambon
- Nephilengys papuana Thorell, 1881 — New Guinea, Queensland

== Nephilingis ==
Nephilingis Kuntner, 2013

- Nephilingis borbonica (Vinson, 1863) — Réunion
- Nephilingis cruentata (Fabricius, 1775) — Tropical Africa, South America
- Nephilingis dodo (Kuntner & Agnarsson, 2011) — Mauritius
- Nephilingis livida (Vinson, 1863) — Madagascar, Comoro Islands, Aldabra, Seychelles

== Nicolepeira ==
Nicolepeira Levi, 2001

- Nicolepeira bicaudata (Nicolet, 1849) — Chile
- Nicolepeira flavifrons (Nicolet, 1849) (type species) — Chile
- Nicolepeira transversalis (Nicolet, 1849) — Chile

== Novakiella ==
Novakiella Court & Forster, 1993

- Novakiella trituberculosa (Roewer, 1942) — Australia, New Zealand

== Novaranea ==
Novaranea Court & Forster, 1988

- Novaranea courti Framenau, 2011 — New South Wales, Victoria, Tasmania
- Novaranea queribunda (Keyserling, 1887) (type species) — New Zealand

== Nuctenea ==
Nuctenea Simon, 1864

- Nuctenea cedrorum (Simon, 1929) — Algeria
- Nuctenea silvicultrix (C. L. Koch, 1835) — Palearctic
- Nuctenea umbratica (Clerck, 1757) (type species) — Europe to Azerbaijan

== Oarces ==
Oarces Simon, 1879

- Oarces reticulatus (Nicolet, 1849) (type species) - Chile, Argentina

== Ocrepeira ==
Ocrepeira Marx, 1883

- Ocrepeira abiseo Levi, 1993 — Peru
- Ocrepeira albopunctata (Taczanowski, 1879) — Peru, Brazil, Guyana, French Guiana
- Ocrepeira anta Levi, 1993 — Colombia
- Ocrepeira aragua Levi, 1993 — Venezuela
- Ocrepeira arturi Levi, 1993 — Panama
- Ocrepeira atuncela Levi, 1993 — Colombia
- Ocrepeira barbara Levi, 1993 — Peru
- Ocrepeira bispinosa (Mello-Leitao, 1945) — Brazil
- Ocrepeira branta Levi, 1993 — Jamaica
- Ocrepeira camaca Levi, 1993 — Brazil
- Ocrepeira comaina Levi, 1993 — Peru
- Ocrepeira covillei Levi, 1993 — Costa Rica, Trinidad to Bolivia
- Ocrepeira cuy Levi, 1993 — Peru
- Ocrepeira darlingtoni (Bryant, 1945) — Hispaniola
- Ocrepeira duocypha (Chamberlin, 1916) — Peru
- Ocrepeira ectypa (Walckenaer, 1841) (type species) — USA
- Ocrepeira fiebrigi (Dahl, 1906) — Brazil, Paraguay
- Ocrepeira galianoae Levi, 1993 — Brazil, Argentina
- Ocrepeira georgia (Levi, 1976) — USA
- Ocrepeira gima Levi, 1993 — Brazil
- Ocrepeira globosa (F. O. P.-Cambridge, 1904) — USA, Mexico
- Ocrepeira gnomo (Mello-Leitao, 1943) — Brazil
- Ocrepeira gulielmi Levi, 1993 — Colombia, Ecuador
- Ocrepeira heredia Levi, 1993 — Costa Rica
- Ocrepeira herrera Levi, 1993 — Colombia, Ecuador, Peru
- Ocrepeira hirsuta (Mello-Leitao, 1942) — Brazil, Paraguay, Argentina
- Ocrepeira hondura Levi, 1993 — Costa Rica
- Ocrepeira incerta (Bryant, 1936) — Cuba
- Ocrepeira ituango Levi, 1993 — Colombia
- Ocrepeira jacara Levi, 1993 — Brazil
- Ocrepeira jamora Levi, 1993 — Ecuador
- Ocrepeira klossi Levi, 1993 — Brazil
- Ocrepeira lapeza Levi, 1993 — Colombia
- Ocrepeira lisei Levi, 1993 — Brazil
- Ocrepeira lurida (Mello-Leitao, 1943) — Bolivia, Argentina
- Ocrepeira macaiba Levi, 1993 — Brazil
- Ocrepeira macintyrei Levi, 1993 — Ecuador
- Ocrepeira magdalena Levi, 1993 — Colombia
- Ocrepeira malleri Levi, 1993 — Brazil
- Ocrepeira maltana Levi, 1993 — Peru
- Ocrepeira maraca Levi, 1993 — Colombia, Venezuela, Brazil
- Ocrepeira maroni Dierkens, 2014 - French Guiana
- Ocrepeira mastophoroides (Mello-Leitao, 1942) — Argentina
- Ocrepeira molle Levi, 1993 — Bolivia, Argentina
- Ocrepeira pedregal Levi, 1993 — Mexico, Nicaragua
- Ocrepeira pinhal Levi, 1993 — Brazil
- Ocrepeira pista Levi, 1993 — Peru
- Ocrepeira planada Levi, 1993 — Colombia, Ecuador
- Ocrepeira potosi Levi, 1993 — Mexico
- Ocrepeira redempta (Gertsch & Mulaik, 1936) — USA to Honduras
- Ocrepeira redondo Levi, 1993 — Colombia
- Ocrepeira rufa (O. P.-Cambridge, 1889) — Mexico to Costa Rica
- Ocrepeira saladito Levi, 1993 — Colombia
- Ocrepeira serrallesi (Bryant, 1947) — West Indies
- Ocrepeira sorota Levi, 1993 — Bolivia
- Ocrepeira steineri Levi, 1993 — Venezuela
- Ocrepeira subrufa (F. O. P.-Cambridge, 1904) — Mexico to Panama
- Ocrepeira tinajillas Levi, 1993 — Colombia, Ecuador
- Ocrepeira tumida (Keyserling, 1865) — Colombia, Ecuador
- Ocrepeira tungurahua Levi, 1993 — Ecuador
- Ocrepeira valderramai Levi, 1993 — Colombia
- Ocrepeira venustula (Keyserling, 1879) — Colombia to Chile
- Ocrepeira verecunda (Keyserling, 1865) — Colombia
- Ocrepeira viejo Levi, 1993 — Costa Rica to Peru
- Ocrepeira willisi Levi, 1993 — Panama
- Ocrepeira yaelae Levi, 1993 — Ecuador
- Ocrepeira yucatan Levi, 1993 — Mexico

== Ordgarius ==
Ordgarius Keyserling, 1886

- Ordgarius acanthonotus (Simon, 1909) — Vietnam
- Ordgarius bicolor Pocock, 1899 — New Britain
- Ordgarius clypeatus Simon, 1897 — Amboina
- Ordgarius ephippiatus Thorell, 1898 — Myanmar
- Ordgarius furcatus (O. P.-Cambridge, 1877) — New South Wales
  - Ordgarius furcatus distinctus (Rainbow, 1900) — New South Wales
- Ordgarius hexaspinus Saha & Raychaudhuri, 2004 — India
- Ordgarius hobsoni (O. P.-Cambridge, 1877) — India, Sri Lanka, China, Japan
- Ordgarius magnificus (Rainbow, 1897) — Queensland, New South Wales
- Ordgarius monstrosus Keyserling, 1886 (type species) — Queensland
- Ordgarius pustulosus Thorell, 1897 — Java
- Ordgarius sexspinosus (Thorell, 1894) — India to Japan, Indonesia

== Paralarinia ==
Paralarinia Grasshoff, 1970

- Paralarinia agnata Grasshoff, 1970 — Congo
- Paralarinia bartelsi (Lessert, 1933) — South Africa
- Paralarinia denisi (Lessert, 1938) (type species) — Congo
- Paralarinia incerta (Tullgren, 1910) — Central, East Africa

== Paraplectana ==
Paraplectana Brito Capello, 1867

- Paraplectana coccinella (Thorell, 1890) — Myanmar, Nias Islands
- Paraplectana duodecimmaculata Simon, 1897 — Java
- Paraplectana gravelyi (Tikader, 1961) - India
- Paraplectana hemisphaerica (C. L. Koch, 1844) — Sierra Leone
- Paraplectana kittenbergeri Caporiacco, 1947 — Tanzania
- Paraplectana multimaculata Thorell, 1899 — Cameroon, East Africa
- Paraplectana rajashree Ahmed et al., 2015 - India
- Paraplectana sakaguchii Uyemura, 1938 — China, Japan
- Paraplectana thorntoni (Blackwall, 1865) (type species) — Central Africa, Yemen
  - Paraplectana thorntoni occidentalis Strand, 1916 — West, Central Africa
- Paraplectana tsushimensis Yamaguchi, 1960 — China, Taiwan, Japan
- Paraplectana walleri (Blackwall, 1865) — West, Central Africa, Madagascar
  - Paraplectana walleri ashantensis Strand, 1907 — Ghana

== Paraplectanoides ==
Paraplectanoides Keyserling, 1886

- Paraplectanoides crassipes Keyserling, 1886 (type species) — Queensland, New South Wales, Tasmania
- Paraplectanoides kochi (O. P.-Cambridge, 1877) — Queensland

== Pararaneus ==
Pararaneus Caporiacco, 1940

- Pararaneus cyrtoscapus (Pocock, 1898) (type species) — Central, East, Southern Africa, Socotra
- Pararaneus perforatus (Thorell, 1899) — Central, East, Southern Africa
- Pararaneus pseudostriatus (Strand, 1908) — Central, East Africa
- Pararaneus spectator (Karsch, 1885) — Africa, Middle East
- Pararaneus uncivulva (Strand, 1907) — Madagascar

== Parawixia ==
Parawixia F. O. P.-Cambridge, 1904

- Parawixia acapulco Levi, 1992 — Mexico
- Parawixia audax (Blackwall, 1863) — Colombia to Argentina
- Parawixia barbacoas Levi, 1992 — Colombia, Ecuador
- Parawixia bistriata (Rengger, 1836) — Brazil, Bolivia, Paraguay, Argentina
- Parawixia casa Levi, 1992 — Colombia
- Parawixia chubut Levi, 2001 — Chile, Argentina
- Parawixia dehaani (Doleschall, 1859) — India to Philippines, New Guinea
  - Parawixia dehaani octopunctigera (Strand, 1911) — New Ireland
  - Parawixia dehaani pygituberculata (Strand, 1911) — New Ireland, Sulawesi
  - Parawixia dehaani quadripunctigera (Strand, 1911) — Aru Islands
- Parawixia destricta (O. P.-Cambridge, 1889) (type species) — Mexico to Panama
- Parawixia divisoria Levi, 1992 — Ecuador, Peru, Brazil, Bolivia
- Parawixia guatemalensis (O. P.-Cambridge, 1889) — Mexico, Guatemala
- Parawixia honesta (O. P.-Cambridge, 1899) — Mexico
- Parawixia hoxaea (O. P.-Cambridge, 1889) — Guatemala to Panama
- Parawixia hypocrita (O. P.-Cambridge, 1889) — Guatemala to Brazil
- Parawixia inopinata Camargo, 1950 — Brazil
- Parawixia kochi (Taczanowski, 1873) — Trinidad to Brazil, Guyana, French Guiana
- Parawixia maldonado Levi, 1992 — Peru
- Parawixia matiapa Levi, 1992 — Trinidad, Colombia, Peru, Brazil
- Parawixia monticola (Keyserling, 1892) — Brazil
- Parawixia nesophila Chamberlin & Ivie, 1936 — Costa Rica, Panama
- Parawixia ouro Levi, 1992 — Peru, Brazil
- Parawixia porvenir Levi, 1992 — Colombia
- Parawixia rigida (O. P.-Cambridge, 1889) — Guatemala to Panama
- Parawixia rimosa (Keyserling, 1892) — Costa Rica to Bolivia
- Parawixia tarapoa Levi, 1992 — Ecuador, Peru, Brazil
- Parawixia tomba Levi, 1992 — Peru, Brazil
- Parawixia tredecimnotata F. O. P.-Cambridge, 1904 — Mexico to Belize, Greater Antilles
- Parawixia undulata (Keyserling, 1892) — Brazil, Uruguay, Argentina
- Parawixia velutina (Taczanowski, 1878) — Colombia to Argentina

== Parmatergus ==
Parmatergus Emerit, 1994

- Parmatergus coccinelloides Emerit, 1994 (type species) — Madagascar
  - Parmatergus coccinelloides ambrae Emerit, 1994 — Madagascar
- Parmatergus lens Emerit, 1994 — Madagascar

== Pasilobus ==
Pasilobus Simon, 1895

- Pasilobus antongilensis Emerit, 2000 — Madagascar
- Pasilobus bufoninus (Simon, 1867) (type species) — Taiwan, Java, Moluccas
- Pasilobus capuroni Emerit, 2000 — Madagascar
- Pasilobus conohumeralis (Hasselt, 1894) — Sumatra, Java
- Pasilobus dippenaarae Roff & Haddad, 2015 - South Africa
- Pasilobus hupingensis Yin, Bao & Kim, 2001 — China, Japan
- Pasilobus insignis O. P.-Cambridge, 1908 — West Africa
- Pasilobus kotigeharus Tikader, 1963 — India
- Pasilobus laevis Lessert, 1930 — Congo
- Pasilobus lunatus Simon, 1897 — Java, Sulawesi
- Pasilobus mammatus Pocock, 1898 — Solomon Islands
- Pasilobus mammosus (Pocock, 1899) — West Africa
- Pasilobus nigrohumeralis (Hasselt, 1882) — Sumatra

== Perilla ==
Perilla Thorell, 1895

- Perilla teres Thorell, 1895 — Myanmar, Vietnam, Malaysia

== Pherenice ==
Pherenice Thorell, 1899

- Pherenice tristis Thorell, 1899 — Cameroon

== Phonognatha ==
Phonognatha Simon, 1894

- Phonognatha graeffei (Keyserling, 1865) (type species) — Australia
  - Phonognatha graeffei neocaledonica Berland, 1924 — New Caledonia
- Phonognatha guanga Barrion & Litsinger, 1995 — Philippines
- Phonognatha joannae Berland, 1924 — New Caledonia
- Phonognatha melania (L. Koch, 1871) — Australia, Tasmania
- Phonognatha melanopyga (L. Koch, 1871) — Australia, Tasmania
- Phonognatha pallida (Dalmas, 1917) — Western Australia

== Pitharatus ==
Pitharatus Simon, 1895

- Pitharatus junghuhni (Doleschall, 1859) — Malaysia, Java, Sulawesi

== Plebs ==
Plebs Joseph & Framenau, 2012

- Plebs arleneae Joseph & Framenau, 2012 — Queensland, New South Wales
- Plebs arletteae Joseph & Framenau, 2012 — Lord Howe Island
- Plebs astridae (Strand, 1917) — China, Korea, Taiwan, Japan
- Plebs aurea (Saito, 1934) — Japan
- Plebs baotianmanensis (Hu, Wang & Wang, 1991) — China
- Plebs bradleyi (Keyserling, 1887) — Southeastern Australia, Tasmania
- Plebs cyphoxis (Simon, 1908) — Western Australia, South Australia
- Plebs eburnus (Keyserling, 1886) (type species) — Eastern Australia, Tasmania
- Plebs himalayaensis (Tikader, 1975) — India, possibly China
- Plebs mitratus (Simon, 1895) — India
- Plebs neocaledonicus (Berland, 1924) — New Caledonia
- Plebs oculosus (Zhu & Song, 1994) — China
- Plebs opacus Joseph & Framenau, 2012 — Vanuatu
- Plebs patricius Joseph & Framenau, 2012 — Victoria, Tasmania
- Plebs plumiopedellus (Yin, Wang & Zhang, 1987) — China, Taiwan
- Plebs poecilus (Zhu & Wang, 1994) — China
- Plebs rosemaryae Joseph & Framenau, 2012 — Queensland, Norfolk Islands
- Plebs sachalinensis (Saito, 1934) — Russia, China, Korea, Japan
- Plebs salesi Joseph & Framenau, 2012 — New Guinea
- Plebs sebastiani Joseph & Framenau, 2012 — Philippines
- Plebs tricentrus (Zhu & Song, 1994) — China
- Plebs yanbaruensis (Tanikawa, 2000) — Japan

== Poecilarcys ==
Poecilarcys Simon, 1895

- Poecilarcys ditissimus (Simon, 1885) — Tunisia

== Poecilopachys ==
Poecilopachys Simon, 1895

- Poecilopachys australasia (Griffith & Pidgeon, 1833) (type species) — Queensland, New South Wales, Samoa
- Poecilopachys jenningsi (Rainbow, 1899) — New Hebrides
- Poecilopachys minutissima Chrysanthus, 1971 — New Ireland
- Poecilopachys speciosa (L. Koch, 1872) — Queensland
- Poecilopachys verrucosa (L. Koch, 1871) — New Guinea, Queensland, Samoa

== Poltys ==
Poltys C. L. Koch, 1843

- Poltys acuminatus Thorell, 1898 — Myanmar
- Poltys apiculatus Thorell, 1892 — Singapore
- Poltys baculiger Simon, 1907 — Gabon
- Poltys bhabanii (Tikader, 1970) — India
- Poltys bhavnagarensis Patel, 1988 — India
- Poltys caelatus Simon, 1907 — Sierra Leone, Gabon, Sao Tome
- Poltys columnaris Thorell, 1890 — India, Sri Lanka, Sumatra, Japan
- Poltys corticosus Pocock, 1898 — East Africa
- Poltys dubius (Walckenaer, 1841) — Vietnam
- Poltys elevatus Thorell, 1890 — Sumatra
- Poltys ellipticus Han, Zhang & Zhu, 2010 — China
- Poltys fornicatus Simon, 1907 — Principe
- Poltys frenchi Hogg, 1899 — New Guinea, Moluccas, Queensland
- Poltys furcifer Simon, 1881 — Zanzibar, South Africa
- Poltys godrejii Bastawade & Khandal, 2006 — India
- Poltys grayi Smith, 2006 — Lord Howe Islands
- Poltys hainanensis Han, Zhang & Zhu, 2010 — China
- Poltys horridus Locket, 1980 — Comoro Islands, Seychelles
- Poltys idae (Ausserer, 1871) — Borneo
- Poltys illepidus C. L. Koch, 1843 (type species) — Thailand to Australia, Lord Howe Islands, Norfolk Islands
- Poltys jujorum Smith, 2006 — Queensland
- Poltys kochi Keyserling, 1864 — Mauritius, Madagascar
- Poltys laciniosus Keyserling, 1886 — Australia
- Poltys longitergus Hogg, 1919 — Sumatra
- Poltys milledgei Smith, 2006 — Western Australia, Northern Territory, Bali, Sumbawa
- Poltys monstrosus Simon, 1897 — Sierra Leone
- Poltys mouhoti (Günther, 1862) — Vietnam
- Poltys nagpurensis Tikader, 1982 — India
- Poltys nigrinus Saito, 1933 — Taiwan
- Poltys noblei Smith, 2006 — Queensland, New South Wales, Victoria
- Poltys pannuceus Thorell, 1895 — Myanmar
- Poltys pogonias Thorell, 1891 — Nicobar Islands
- Poltys pygmaeus Han, Zhang & Zhu, 2010 — China
- Poltys raphanus Thorell, 1898 — Myanmar
- Poltys rehmanii Bastawade & Khandal, 2006 — India
- Poltys reuteri Lenz, 1886 — Madagascar
- Poltys squarrosus Thorell, 1898 — Myanmar
- Poltys stygius Thorell, 1898 — Myanmar to Queensland
- Poltys timmeh Smith, 2006 — New Caledonia, Loyalty Islands
- Poltys turriger Simon, 1897 — Vietnam
- Poltys turritus Thorell, 1898 — Myanmar
- Poltys unguifer Simon, 1909 — Vietnam
- Poltys vesicularis Simon, 1889 — Madagascar

== Porcataraneus ==
Porcataraneus Mi & Peng, 2011

- Porcataraneus bengalensis (Tikader, 1975) — India, China
- Porcataraneus cruciatus Mi & Peng, 2011 (type species)— China
- Porcataraneus nanshenensis (Yin et al., 1990) — China

== Pozonia ==
Pozonia Schenkel, 1953

- Pozonia andujari Alayon, 2007 — Hispaniola
- Pozonia bacillifera (Simon, 1897) — Trinidad to Paraguay
- Pozonia balam Estrada-Alvarez, 2015 - Mexico
- Pozonia dromedaria (O. P.-Cambridge, 1893) — Mexico to Panama
- Pozonia nigroventris (Bryant, 1936) — Mexico to Panama, Cuba, Jamaica

== Prasonica ==
Prasonica Simon, 1895

- Prasonica affinis Strand, 1906 — Algeria
- Prasonica albolimbata Simon, 1895 (type species) — Congo, Madagascar, Yemen
- Prasonica anarillea Roberts, 1983 — Aldabra
- Prasonica hamata Thorell, 1899 — Cameroon
- Prasonica insolens (Simon, 1909) — India, Vietnam, Java
- Prasonica nigrotaeniata (Simon, 1909) — West, Central, East Africa
- Prasonica olivacea Strand, 1906 — Ethiopia
- Prasonica opaciceps (Simon, 1895) — New Guinea
- Prasonica plagiata (Dalmas, 1917) — New Zealand
- Prasonica seriata Simon, 1895 — Africa, Madagascar, Seychelles

== Prasonicella ==
Prasonicella Grasshoff, 1971

- Prasonicella cavipalpis Grasshoff, 1971 (type species) — Madagascar
- Prasonicella marsa Roberts, 1983 — Aldabra

== Pronoides ==
Pronoides Schenkel, 1936

- Pronoides applanatus Mi & Peng, 2013 — China
- Pronoides brunneus Schenkel, 1936 (type species) — Russia, China, Korea, Japan
- Pronoides fusinus Mi & Peng, 2013 — China
- Pronoides guoi Mi & Peng, 2013 — China
- Pronoides sutaiensis Zhang, Zhang & Zhu, 2010 — China
- Pronoides trapezius Mi & Peng, 2013 — China

== Pronous ==
Pronous Keyserling, 1881

- Pronous affinis Simon, 1901 — Malaysia
- Pronous beatus (O. P.-Cambridge, 1893) — Mexico to Costa Rica
- Pronous colon Levi, 1995 — Costa Rica
- Pronous felipe Levi, 1995 — Mexico
- Pronous golfito Levi, 1995 — Costa Rica
- Pronous intus Levi, 1995 — Costa Rica to Brazil
- Pronous lancetilla Levi, 1995 — Honduras
- Pronous nigripes Caporiacco, 1947 — Guyana
- Pronous pance Levi, 1995 — Colombia
- Pronous peje Levi, 1995 — Costa Rica, Panama
- Pronous quintana Levi, 1995 — Mexico
- Pronous shanus Levi, 1995 — Panama
- Pronous tetralobus Simon, 1895 — Madagascar
- Pronous tuberculifer Keyserling, 1881 (type species) — Colombia to Argentina
- Pronous valle Levi, 1995 — Colombia
- Pronous wixoides (Chamberlin & Ivie, 1936) — Panama, Colombia, Ecuador

== Pseudartonis ==
Pseudartonis Simon, 1903

- Pseudartonis flavonigra Caporiacco, 1947 — Ethiopia
- Pseudartonis lobata Simon, 1909 — East Africa
- Pseudartonis occidentalis Simon, 1903 (type species) — Guinea-Bissau, Cameroon
- Pseudartonis semicoccinea Simon, 1907 — Sao Tome

== Pseudopsyllo ==
Pseudopsyllo Strand, 1916

- Pseudopsyllo scutigera Strand, 1916 — Cameroon

== Psyllo ==
Psyllo Thorell, 1899

- Psyllo nitida Thorell, 1899 — Cameroon, Congo

== Pycnacantha ==
Pycnacantha Blackwall, 1865

- Pycnacantha dinteri Meise, 1932 — Namibia
- Pycnacantha echinotes Meise, 1932 — Cameroon
- Pycnacantha fuscosa Simon, 1903 — Madagascar
- Pycnacantha tribulus (Fabricius, 1781) (type species) — Central, South Africa

== Rubrepeira ==
Rubrepeira Levi, 1992

- Rubrepeira rubronigra (Mello-Leitao, 1939) — Mexico to Brazil, Guyana

== Scoloderus ==
Scoloderus Simon, 1887

- Scoloderus ackerlyi Traw, 1996 — Belize
- Scoloderus cordatus (Taczanowski, 1879) (type species) — Mexico to Argentina
- Scoloderus gibber (O. P.-Cambridge, 1898) — Mexico to Argentina
- Scoloderus nigriceps (O. P.-Cambridge, 1895) — USA, Mexico, Bahama Islands, Cuba, Jamaica
- Scoloderus tuberculifer (O. P.-Cambridge, 1889) — USA to Argentina

== Sedasta ==
Sedasta Simon, 1894

- Sedasta ferox Simon, 1894 — West Africa

== Singa ==
Singa C. L. Koch, 1836

- Singa albobivittata Caporiacco, 1947 — Tanzania
- Singa albodorsata Kauri, 1950 — South Africa
- Singa alpigena Yin, Wang & Li, 1983 — China
- Singa alpigenoides Song & Zhu, 1992 — China
- Singa ammophila Levy, 2007 — Israel
- Singa aussereri Thorell, 1873 — Europe
- Singa bifasciata Schenkel, 1936 — China
- Singa chota Tikader, 1970 — India
- Singa concinna Karsch, 1884 — Sao Tome
- Singa cruciformis Yin, Peng & Wang, 1994 — China
- Singa cyanea (Worley, 1928) — USA
- Singa eugeni Levi, 1972 — USA
- Singa haddooensis Tikader, 1977 — Andaman Islands
- Singa hamata (Clerck, 1757) (type species) — Palearctic
- Singa hilira Barrion & Litsinger, 1995 — Philippines
- Singa kansuensis Schenkel, 1936 — China
- Singa keyserlingi McCook, 1894 — USA, Canada
- Singa lawrencei (Lessert, 1930) — Congo
- Singa leucoplagiata (Simon, 1899) — Sumatra
- Singa lucina (Audouin, 1826) — Mediterranean to Central Asia
  - Singa lucina eburnea (Simon, 1929) — Algeria, Tunisia
- Singa myrrhea (Simon, 1895) — India
- Singa neta (O. P.-Cambridge, 1872) — Mediterranean
- Singa nitidula C. L. Koch, 1844 — Palearctic
- Singa perpolita (Thorell, 1892) — Singapore
- Singa semiatra L. Koch, 1867 — Mediterranean, Ukraine
- Singa simoniana Costa, 1885 — Sardinia
- Singa theodori (Thorell, 1894) — Java

== Singafrotypa ==
Singafrotypa Benoit, 1962

- Singafrotypa acanthopus (Simon, 1907) (type species) — Bioko, Ivory Coast, Congo
- Singafrotypa mandela Kuntner & Hormiga, 2002 — South Africa
- Singafrotypa okavango Kuntner & Hormiga, 2002 — Botswana
- Singafrotypa subinermis (Caporiacco, 1940) — Ethiopia

== Siwa ==
Siwa Grasshoff, 1970

- Siwa atomaria (O. P.-Cambridge, 1876) (type species) — Egypt, Israel
- Siwa dufouri (Simon, 1874) — Western Mediterranean

== Spilasma ==
Spilasma Simon, 1897

- Spilasma baptistai Levi, 1995 — Brazil
- Spilasma duodecimguttata (Keyserling, 1879) (type species) — Honduras to Bolivia, Brazil
- Spilasma utaca Levi, 1995 — Peru

== Spinepeira ==
Spinepeira Levi, 1995

- Spinepeira schlingeri Levi, 1995 — Peru

== Spintharidius ==
Spintharidius Simon, 1893

- Spintharidius rhomboidalis Simon, 1893 (type species) — Brazil, Peru, Bolivia, Paraguay
- Spintharidius viridis Franganillo, 1926 — Cuba

== Taczanowskia ==
Taczanowskia Keyserling, 1879

- Taczanowskia gustavoi Ibarra-Núñez, 2013 — Mexico
- Taczanowskia mirabilis Simon, 1897 — Bolivia, Brazil
- Taczanowskia sextuberculata Keyserling, 1892 — Colombia, Brazil
- Taczanowskia striata Keyserling, 1879 (type species) — Peru, Brazil, Argentina
- Taczanowskia trilobata Simon, 1897 — Brazil

== Talthybia ==
Talthybia Thorell, 1898

- Talthybia depressa Thorell, 1898 — China, Myanmar

== Tatepeira ==
Tatepeira Levi, 1995

- Tatepeira carrolli Levi, 1995 — Colombia
- Tatepeira itu Levi, 1995 — Brazil
- Tatepeira stadelmani Levi, 1995 — Honduras
- Tatepeira tatarendensis (Tullgren, 1905) (type species) — Colombia to Bolivia, Bolivia

== Telaprocera ==
Telaprocera Harmer & Framenau, 2008

- Telaprocera joanae Harmer & Framenau, 2008 — Queensland to Victoria
- Telaprocera maudae Harmer & Framenau, 2008 (type species) — Queensland, New South Wales

== Testudinaria ==
Testudinaria Taczanowski, 1879

- Testudinaria bonaldoi Levi, 2005 — Brazil
- Testudinaria debsmithae Levi, 2005 — Suriname to Peru, Bolivia
- Testudinaria elegans Taczanowski, 1879 — Panama to Peru
- Testudinaria geometrica Taczanowski, 1879 (type species) — Panama to Peru, Brazil
- Testudinaria gravatai Levi, 2005 — Brazil
- Testudinaria lemniscata (Simon, 1893) — Brazil
- Testudinaria quadripunctata Taczanowski, 1879 — Venezuela to Peru, Bolivia, Brazil
- Testudinaria rosea (Mello-Leitao, 1945) — Argentina
- Testudinaria unipunctata (Simon, 1893) — Brazil

== Thelacantha ==
Thelacantha Hasselt, 1882

- Thelacantha brevispina (Doleschall, 1857) — Madagascar, India to Philippines, Australia

== Thorellina ==
Thorellina Berg, 1899

- Thorellina acuminata (Thorell, 1898) (type species) — Myanmar
- Thorellina anepsia (Kulczynski, 1911) — New Guinea

== Togacantha ==
Togacantha Dahl, 1914

- Togacantha nordviei (Strand, 1913) — West, Central, East Africa

== Umbonata ==
Umbonata Grasshoff, 1971

- Umbonata spinosissima (Tullgren, 1910) — Tanzania

== Ursa ==
Ursa Simon, 1895

- Ursa flavovittata Simon, 1909 — Vietnam
- Ursa lunula (Nicolet, 1849) — Chile
- Ursa pulchra Simon, 1895 (type species) — Brazil
- Ursa turbinata Simon, 1895 — South Africa
- Ursa vittigera Simon, 1895 — Sri Lanka

== Verrucosa ==
Verrucosa McCook, 1888

- Verrucosa alvarengai Lise, Kesster & Silva, 2015 - Brazil
- Verrucosa apuela Lise, Kesster & Silva, 2015 - Ecuador
- Verrucosa arenata (Walckenaer, 1841) (type species) — USA to Panama, Greater Antilles
- Verrucosa avilesae Lise, Kesster & Silva, 2015 - Ecuador, Colombia
- Verrucosa bartica Lise, Kesster & Silva, 2015 - Guyana
- Verrucosa benavidesae Lise, Kesster & Silva, 2015 - Colombia, Peru
- Verrucosa brachiscapa Lise, Kesster & Silva, 2015 - Ecuador
- Verrucosa cachimbo Lise, Kesster & Silva, 2015 - Brazil
- Verrucosa cajamarca Lise, Kesster & Silva, 2015 - Peru
- Verrucosa caninde Lise, Kesster & Silva, 2015 - Brazil
- Verrucosa canje Lise, Kesster & Silva, 2015 - Guyana
- Verrucosa carara Lise, Kesster & Silva, 2015 - Costa Rica
- Verrucosa chanchamayo Lise, Kesster & Silva, 2015 - Peru
- Verrucosa coroico Lise, Kesster & Silva, 2015 - Bolivia
- Verrucosa cuyabenoensis Lise, Kesster & Silva, 2015 - Ecuador, Bolivia
- Verrucosa cuyuni Lise, Kesster & Silva, 2015 - Guyana
- Verrucosa cylicophora (Badcock, 1932) - Brazil, Paraguay
- Verrucosa excavata Lise, Kesster & Silva, 2015 - Colombia
- Verrucosa florezi Lise, Kesster & Silva, 2015 - Colombia
- Verrucosa furcifera (Keyserling, 1886) — Queensland
- Verrucosa galianoae Lise, Kesster & Silva, 2015 - Brazil
- Verrucosa guatopo Lise, Kesster & Silva, 2015 - Venezuela
- Verrucosa hoferi Lise, Kesster & Silva, 2015 - Brazil
- Verrucosa lampra (Soares & Camargo, 1948) - Brazil
- Verrucosa lata Lise, Kesster & Silva, 2015 - Brazil
- Verrucosa latigastra Lise, Kesster & Silva, 2015 - Guyana, Brazil
- Verrucosa levii Lise, Kesster & Silva, 2015 - Brazil
- Verrucosa macarena Lise, Kesster & Silva, 2015 - Colombia
- Verrucosa manauara Lise, Kesster & Silva, 2015 - Brazil
- Verrucosa meridionalis (Keyserling, 1892) — Brazil, Paraguay
- Verrucosa meta Lise, Kesster & Silva, 2015 - Colombia
- Verrucosa opon Lise, Kesster & Silva, 2015 - Colombia
- Verrucosa pedrera Lise, Kesster & Silva, 2015 - Colombia
- Verrucosa rancho Lise, Kesster & Silva, 2015 - Venezuela
- Verrucosa reticulata (O. Pickard-Cambridge, 1889) - Panama
- Verrucosa rhea Lise, Kesster & Silva, 2015 - Brazil
- Verrucosa scapofracta Lise, Kesster & Silva, 2015 - Brazil, Argentina
- Verrucosa septemmammata Caporiacco, 1954 — French Guiana
- Verrucosa sergipana Lise, Kesster & Silva, 2015 - Brazil
- Verrucosa silvae Lise, Kesster & Silva, 2015 - Colombia, Peru
- Verrucosa simla Lise, Kesster & Silva, 2015 - Trinidad
- Verrucosa suaita Lise, Kesster & Silva, 2015 - Colombia
- Verrucosa tarapoa Lise, Kesster & Silva, 2015 - Ecuador, Colombia, Brazil
- Verrucosa tuberculata Lise, Kesster & Silva, 2015 - Colombia
- Verrucosa undecimvariolata (O. P.-Cambridge, 1889) — Mexico to Argentina
- Verrucosa zebra (Keyserling, 1892) — Brazil, Argentina

== Wagneriana ==
Wagneriana F. O. P.-Cambridge, 1904

- Wagneriana acrosomoides (Mello-Leitao, 1939) — Colombia to Brazil
- Wagneriana alma Levi, 1991 — Brazil
- Wagneriana atuna Levi, 1991 — Costa Rica to Paraguay
- Wagneriana bamba Levi, 1991 — Peru
- Wagneriana carimagua Levi, 1991 — Colombia
- Wagneriana carinata F. O. P.-Cambridge, 1904 — Guatemala
- Wagneriana cobella Levi, 1991 — Colombia, Venezuela
- Wagneriana dimastophora (Mello-Leitao, 1940) — Brazil
- Wagneriana eldorado Levi, 1991 — Argentina
- Wagneriana eupalaestra (Mello-Leitao, 1943) — Brazil, Argentina
- Wagneriana fina Alayon, 2011 — Cuba
- Wagneriana gavensis (Camargo, 1950) — Brazil
- Wagneriana grandicornis Mello-Leitao, 1935 — Costa Rica, Brazil
- Wagneriana hassleri Levi, 1991 — Brazil, Guyana
- Wagneriana heteracantha (Mello-Leitao, 1943) — Brazil, Argentina
- Wagneriana huanca Levi, 1991 — Peru
- Wagneriana iguape Levi, 1991 — Brazil, Paraguay
- Wagneriana jacaza Levi, 1991 — Colombia, Brazil
- Wagneriana jelskii (Taczanowski, 1873) — Trinidad to Bolivia
- Wagneriana juquia Levi, 1991 — Brazil, Paraguay, Argentina
- Wagneriana lechuza Levi, 1991 — Peru, Brazil
- Wagneriana levii Pinto-da-Rocha & Buckup, 1995 — Brazil
- Wagneriana madrejon Levi, 1991 — Paraguay
- Wagneriana maseta Levi, 1991 — Colombia to Ecuador and Brazil
- Wagneriana neblina Levi, 1991 — Venezuela
- Wagneriana neglecta (Mello-Leitao, 1939) — Trinidad to Argentina
- Wagneriana pakitza Levi, 1991 — Peru
- Wagneriana roraima Levi, 1991 — Brazil
- Wagneriana silvae Levi, 1991 — Peru, Bolivia
- Wagneriana spicata (O. P.-Cambridge, 1889) — Mexico to Costa Rica
- Wagneriana taboga Levi, 1991 — Panama to Venezuela
- Wagneriana taim Levi, 1991 — Brazil
- Wagneriana tauricornis (O. P.-Cambridge, 1889) (type species) — USA to Peru
- Wagneriana tayos Levi, 1991 — Colombia to Peru
- Wagneriana transitoria (C. L. Koch, 1839) — Venezuela to Argentina
- Wagneriana turrigera Schenkel, 1953 — Venezuela
- Wagneriana undecimtuberculata (Keyserling, 1865) — Panama to Peru
- Wagneriana uropygialis (Mello-Leitao, 1944) — Argentina
- Wagneriana uzaga Levi, 1991 — Brazil, Paraguay, Argentina
- Wagneriana vallenuevo Alayon, 2011 — Hispaniola
- Wagneriana vegas Levi, 1991 — Cuba, Hispaniola
- Wagneriana vermiculata Mello-Leitao, 1949 — Brazil
- Wagneriana yacuma Levi, 1991 — Brazil, Bolivia

== Witica ==
Witica O. P.-Cambridge, 1895

- Witica alobatus (Franganillo, 1931) — Cuba
- Witica cayanus (Taczanowski, 1873) — Northern South America
- Witica crassicaudus (Keyserling, 1865) (type species) — Mexico to Peru

== Wixia ==
Wixia O. P.-Cambridge, 1882

- Wixia abdominalis O. P.-Cambridge, 1882 — Brazil, Guyana, Bolivia

== Xylethrus ==
Xylethrus Simon, 1895

- Xylethrus ameda Levi, 1996 — Brazil
- Xylethrus anomid Levi, 1996 — Peru, Brazil
- Xylethrus arawak Archer, 1965 — Mexico, Jamaica
- Xylethrus perlatus Simon, 1895 — Brazil
- Xylethrus scrupeus Simon, 1895 — Panama to Bolivia, Brazil
- Xylethrus superbus Simon, 1895 (type species) — Colombia, Peru, Bolivia, Paraguay, Brazil

== Yaginumia ==
Yaginumia Archer, 1960

- Yaginumia sia (Strand, 1906) — China, Korea, Taiwan, Japan

== Zealaranea ==
Zealaranea Court & Forster, 1988

- Zealaranea crassa (Walckenaer, 1841) (type species) — New Zealand
- Zealaranea prina Court & Forster, 1988 — New Zealand
- Zealaranea saxitalis (Urquhart, 1887) — New Zealand
- Zealaranea trinotata (Urquhart, 1890) — New Zealand

== Zilla ==
Zilla C. L. Koch, 1834

- Zilla crownia Yin, Xie & Bao, 1996 — China
- Zilla diodia (Walckenaer, 1802) (type species) — Europe to Azerbaijan
- Zilla globosa Saha & Raychaudhuri, 2004 — India
- Zilla qinghaiensis Hu, 2001 — China

== Zygiella ==
Zygiella F. O. P.-Cambridge, 1902

- Zygiella atrica (C. L. Koch, 1845) (type species) — Europe, Russia (USA, Canada, introduced)
- Zygiella calyptrata (Workman & Workman, 1894) — China, Myanmar, Malaysia
- Zygiella carpenteri (Archer, 1951) - USA
- Zygiella dispar (Kulczyński, 1885) - Holarctic
- Zygiella keyserlingi (Ausserer, 1871) — Southern Europe, Ukraine
- Zygiella kirgisica Bakhvalov, 1974 — Kyrgyzstan
- Zygiella minima Schmidt, 1968 — Canary Islands
- Zygiella montana (C. L. Koch, 1834) - Palearctic
- Zygiella nearctica Gertsch, 1964 — Alaska, Canada, USA
- Zygiella pulcherrima (Zawadsky, 1902) — Russia
- Zygiella x-notata (Clerck, 1757) — Holarctic, Neotropical
