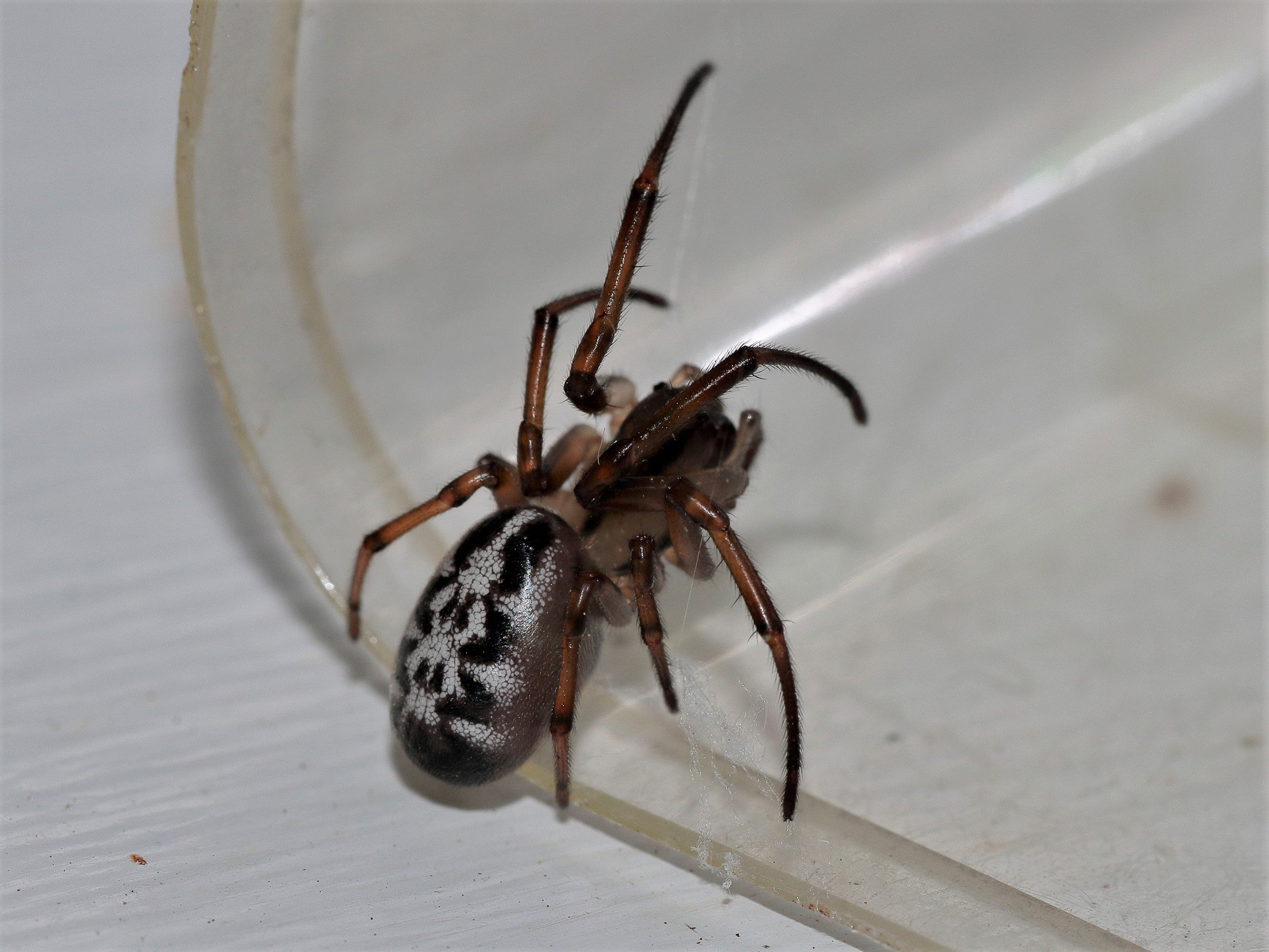

Scientific classification
- Domain: Eukaryota
- Kingdom: Animalia
- Phylum: Arthropoda
- Subphylum: Chelicerata
- Class: Arachnida
- Order: Araneae
- Infraorder: Araneomorphae
- Family: Araneidae
- Genus: Artifex
- Species: A. melanopyga

Binomial name
- Artifex melanopyga L.Koch, 1871 (Australia)

= Phonognatha melanopyga =

Species of spider

Artifex melanopyga, synonym Phonognatha melanopyga, referred to as a leaf curling spider, is a common Australian spider found in moist coastal areas of New South Wales and Queensland. A small member of the family Araneidae, the orb-weavers, it was previously placed in Tetragnathidae.

== Description ==
The spider is distinguished by having a curled leaf at the centre of its web, in which it shelters. The abdomen is a plump oval or egg shape, light in colour with a dark mark at the rear from which the species name "melanopyga" is derived. Additional dark marks form a pattern dorsally on the abdomen. The legs are light brown with the joints darker. Females are 9mm in length and males 7mm.
