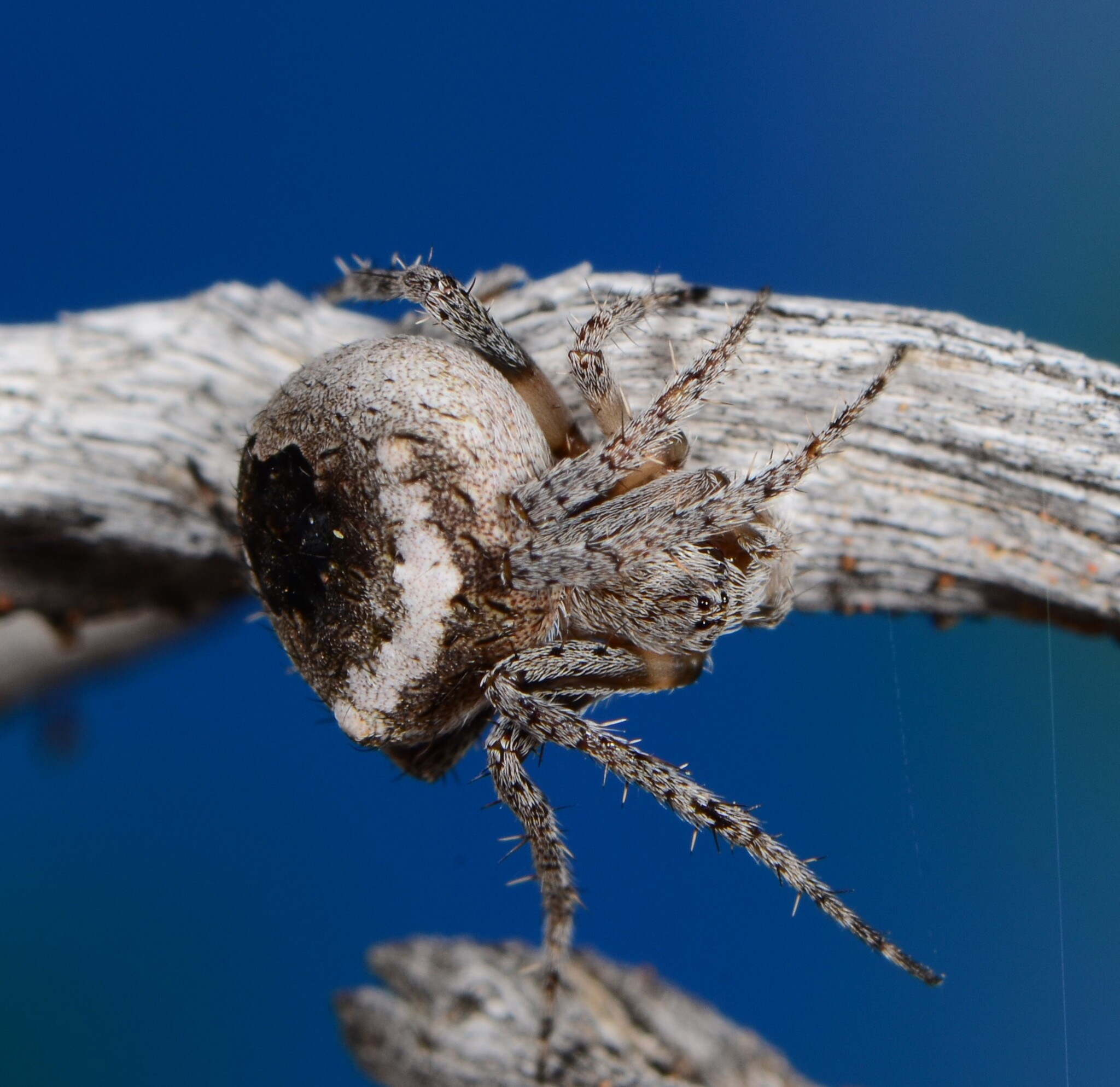
- Female
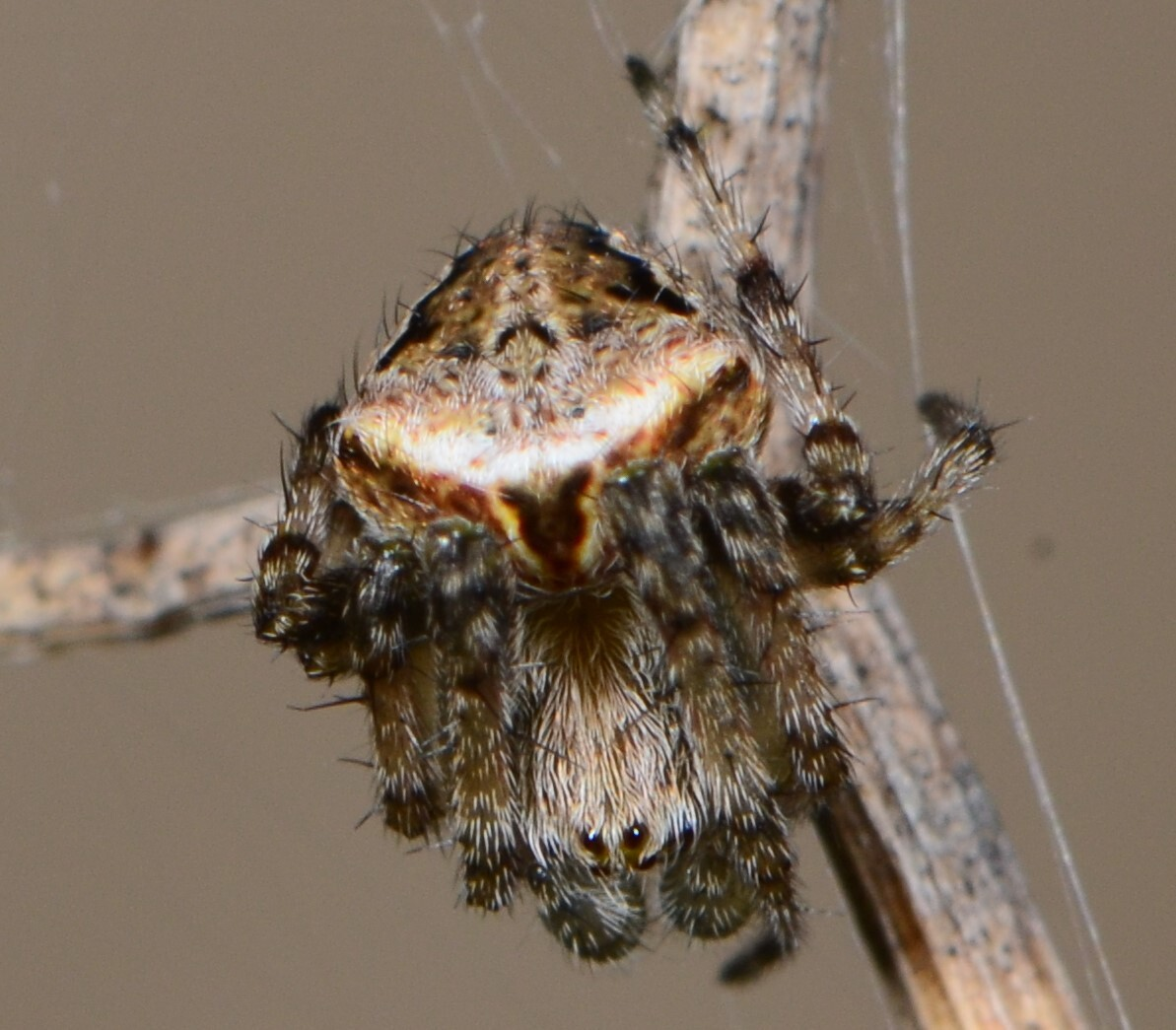
- Male

Scientific classification
- Kingdom: Animalia
- Phylum: Arthropoda
- Subphylum: Chelicerata
- Class: Arachnida
- Order: Araneae
- Infraorder: Araneomorphae
- Family: Araneidae
- Genus: Neoscona
- Species: N. subfusca

Binomial name
- Neoscona subfusca (C. L. Koch, 1837)

Synonyms
- List of synonyms: Atea subfusca C. L. Koch, 1837; Epeira dalmatica Doleschall, 1852; Epeira blanda Blackwall, 1865; Epeira impedita L. Koch, 1867; Epeira illibata Simon, 1870; Epeira perplicata O. Pickard-Cambridge, 1872; Epeira limans Thorell, 1875; Epeira subfusca Lebert, 1877; Epeira radulans Pavesi, 1883; Aranea nigrita Thorell, 1899; Aranea submodesta Strand, 1906; Araneus mesonauta Simon, 1907; Araneus occidaneus Simon, 1907; Araneus arganicola Simon, 1909; Aranea restiaria Tullgren, 1910; Aranea artifex Tullgren, 1910; Araneus dalmaticus Lessert, 1910; Aranea dalmatica Strand, 1915; Araneus hoffmanni Schenkel, 1937; Neoscona albobitriangulosa Caporiacco, 1939; Araneus artifex Caporiacco, 1940; Araneus perplicatus Caporiacco, 1940; Neoscona perplicata Caporiacco, 1941; Neoscona immodesta Caporiacco, 1941; Araneus granatae Caporiacco, 1941; Neoscona artifex Caporiacco, 1947; Araneus tullgreni Caporiacco, 1947; Neoscona wiehlei Caporiacco, 1949; Araneus airensis Denis, 1955; Araneus subfuscus Fuhn & Oltean, 1969; Neoscona parva Schmidt, 1973; Araneus granatai Brignoli, 1983; Neoscona dalmatica Morano & Ferrández, 1986

= Neoscona subfusca =

Common Neoscona Orb-Web Spider

Species of spider

Neoscona subfusca is a species of spider in the family Araneidae. It is commonly known as the common Neoscona orb-web spider.

== Etymology ==
The species name subfusca means "somewhat dark" in Latin.

== Distribution ==
Neoscona subfusca is distributed widely in Africa, Southern Europe, and the near East. In South Africa, the species is very abundant and known from all nine provinces, occurring in more than 40 protected areas at altitudes ranging from 1 to 2,826 m above sea level.

== Habitat and ecology ==
This medium-sized species makes orb-webs in vegetation at night and removes the web early in the morning and rests on plants. The species has been sampled from all the floral biomes. It was also sampled from crops such as avocado, citrus, grapefruit, macadamia, pecan and pistachio orchards, pine plantations, cotton, tomatoes and vineyards. Neoscona subfusca is also associated with the bark of Vachellia xanthophloea trees in Ndumo Game Reserve and Ochna pulchra trees in Nylsvley Nature Reserve.

== Description ==
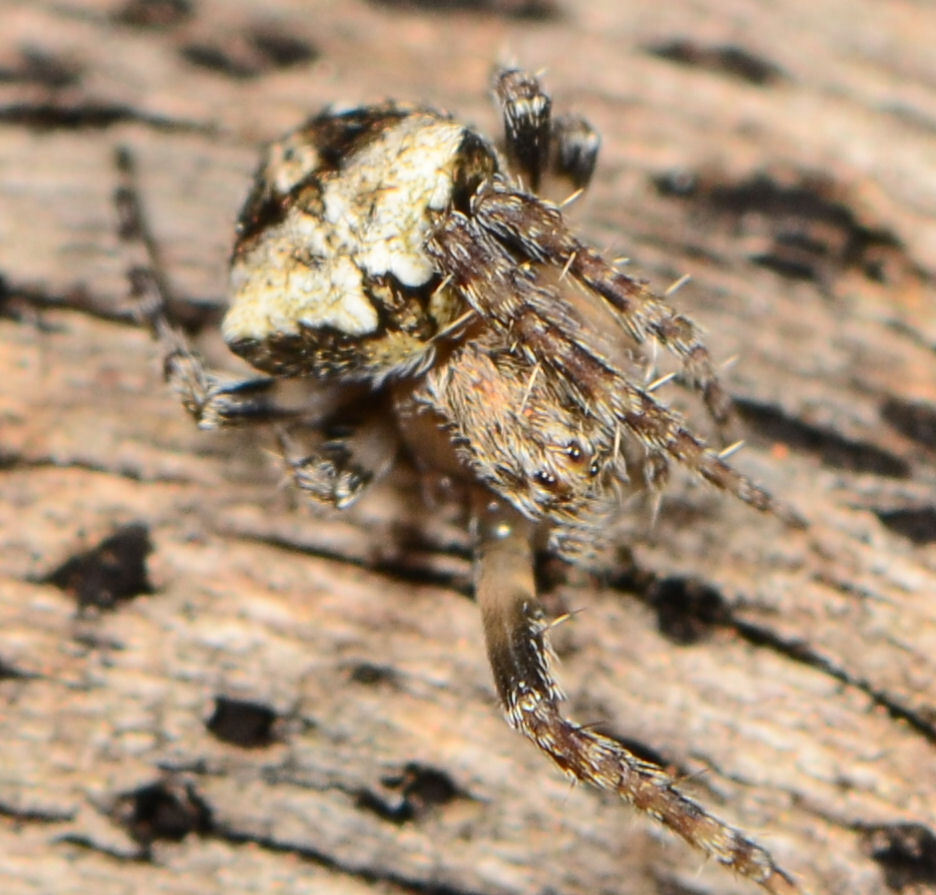
female

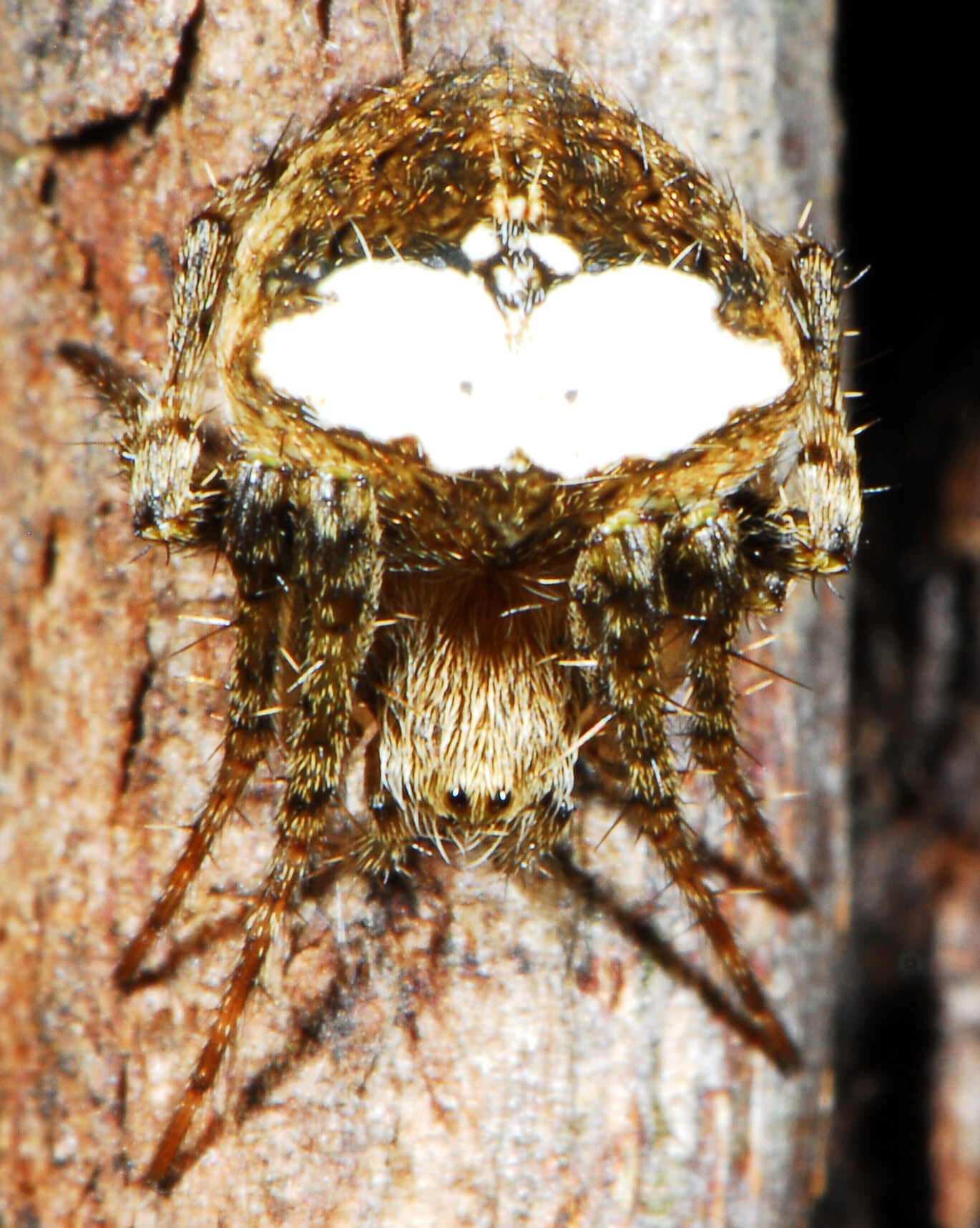
female

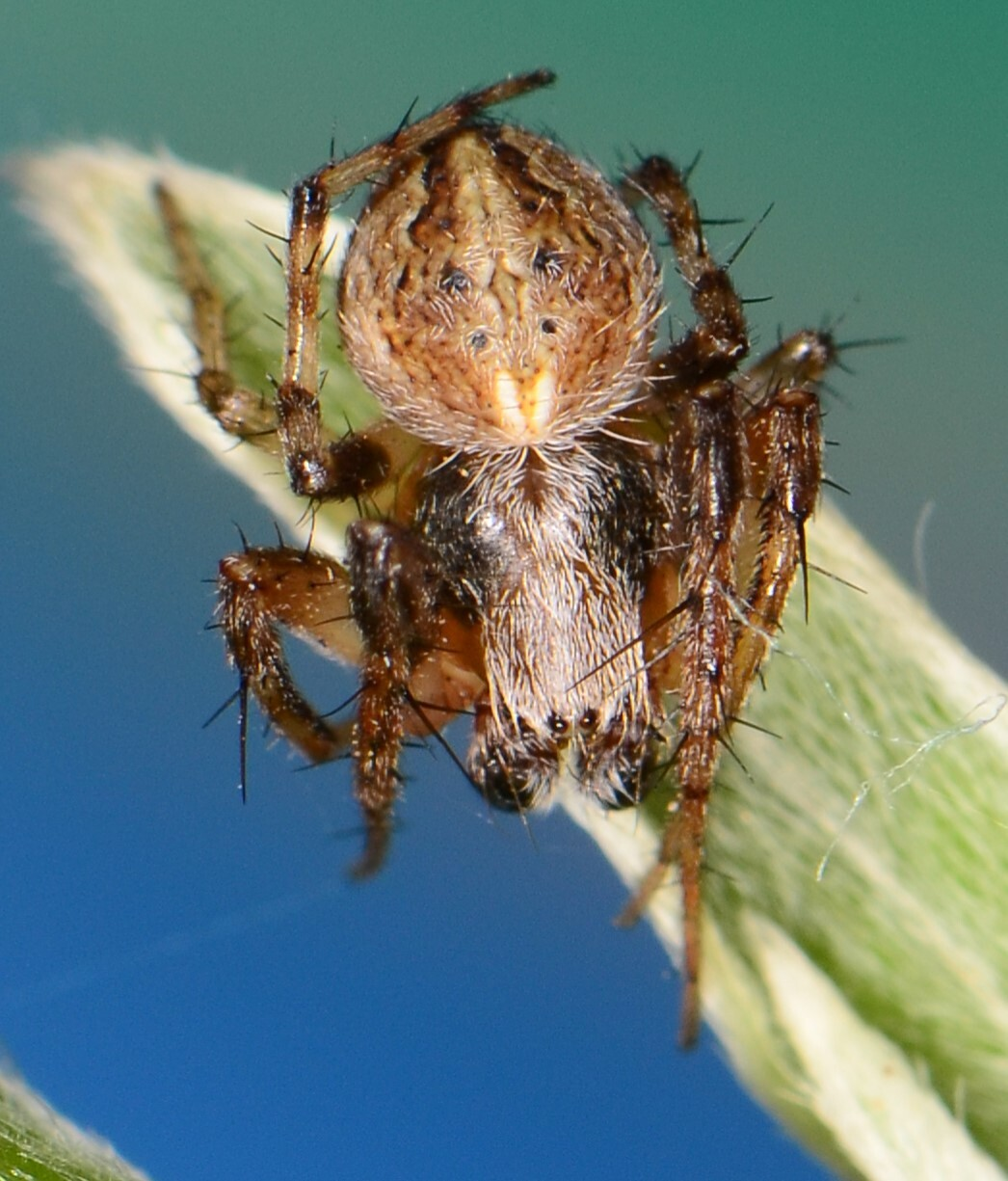
male

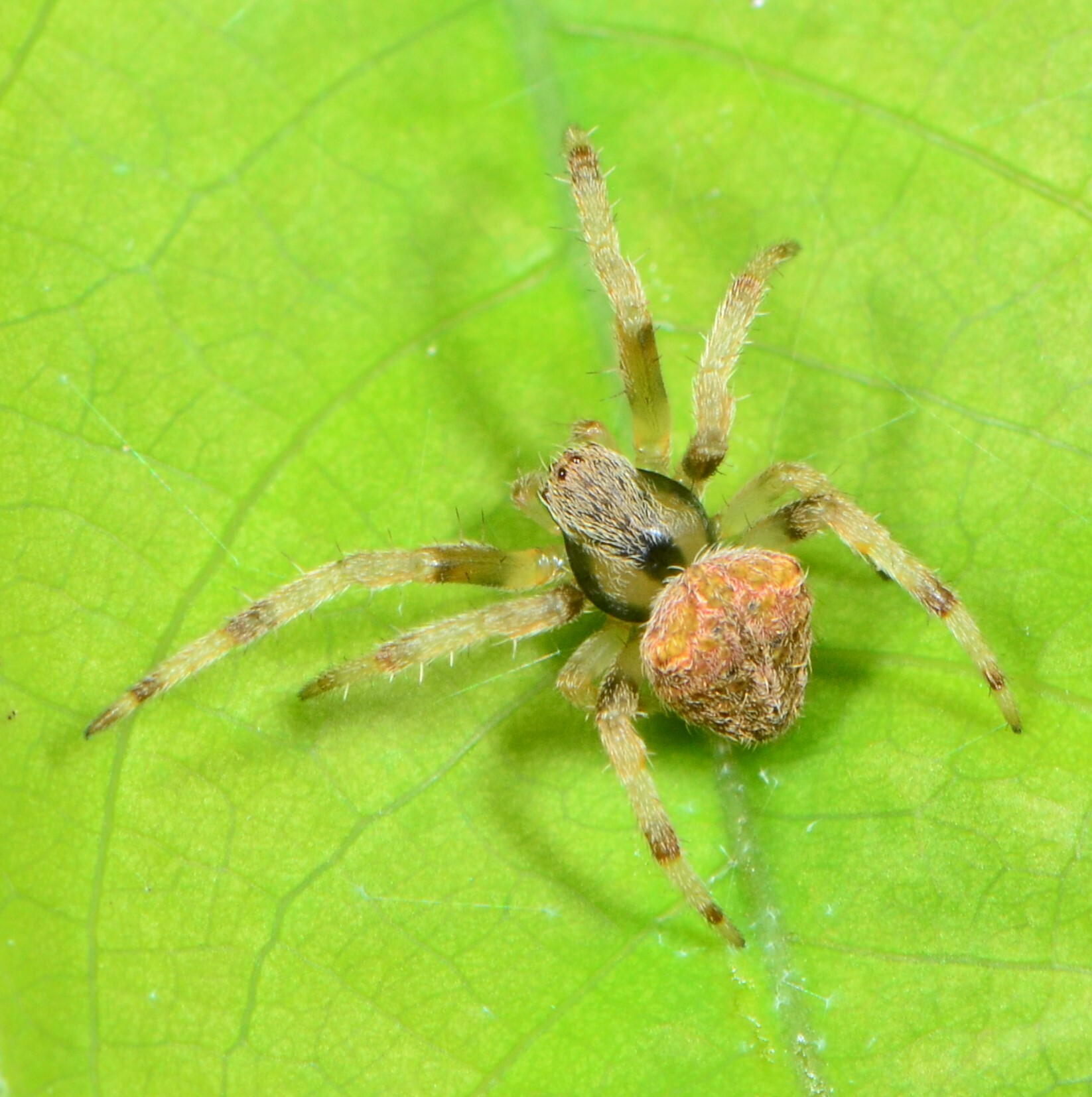
immature

Neoscona subfusca is known from both sexes. These are medium-sized spiders measuring 4.5-10.5 mm in body length.

== Conservation ==
Neoscona subfusca is listed as Least Concern by the South African National Biodiversity Institute due to its wide geographical range. There are no significant threats to the species. The species has been sampled from more than 20 protected areas.

== Taxonomy ==
The species was described by C. L. Koch in 1837 as Atea subfusca from Greece. It was revised by Grasshoff in 1986.
