= Pseudartonis =

Scientific classification
- Kingdom: Animalia
- Phylum: Arthropoda
- Subphylum: Chelicerata
- Class: Arachnida
- Order: Araneae
- Infraorder: Araneomorphae
- Family: Araneidae
- Genus: Pseudartonis; Simon, 1903

Type species
- P. occidentalis Simon, 1903

Species
- 4, see text

Genus of spiders

Pseudartonis is a genus of African orb-weaver spiders first described by Eugène Simon in 1895.

== Species ==
As of April 2019 it contains four species:

- Pseudartonis flavonigra Caporiacco, 1947 – Ethiopia
- Pseudartonis lobata Simon, 1909 – East Africa
- Pseudartonis occidentalis Simon, 1903 (type) – Guinea-Bissau, Cameroon
- Pseudartonis semicoccinea Simon, 1907 – São Tomé and Príncipe
