= Talthybia =

Scientific classification
- Kingdom: Animalia
- Phylum: Arthropoda
- Subphylum: Chelicerata
- Class: Arachnida
- Order: Araneae
- Infraorder: Araneomorphae
- Family: Araneidae
- Genus: Talthybia; Thorell, 1898
- Species: T. depressa

Binomial name
- Talthybia depressa Thorell, 1898

Genus of spiders

Talthybia is a genus of Asian orb-weaver spiders containing the single species, Talthybia depressa. It was first described by Tamerlan Thorell in 1898, and has only been found in China and Myanmar.
