= Umbonata =

Scientific classification
- Domain: Eukaryota
- Kingdom: Animalia
- Phylum: Arthropoda
- Subphylum: Chelicerata
- Class: Arachnida
- Order: Araneae
- Infraorder: Araneomorphae
- Family: Araneidae
- Genus: Umbonata; Grasshoff, 1971
- Species: U. spinosissima

Binomial name
- Umbonata spinosissima (Tullgren, 1910)

Genus of spiders

Umbonata is a genus of Tanzanian orb-weaver spiders containing the single species, Umbonata spinosissima. It was first described by M. Grasshoff in 1971 to contain the single species moved from Mangora.
