= Pherenice =

Scientific classification
- Kingdom: Animalia
- Phylum: Arthropoda
- Subphylum: Chelicerata
- Class: Arachnida
- Order: Araneae
- Infraorder: Araneomorphae
- Family: Araneidae
- Genus: Pherenice; Thorell, 1899
- Species: P. tristis

Binomial name
- Pherenice tristis Thorell, 1899

Genus of spiders

Pherenice is a genus of Central African orb-weaver spiders containing the single species, Pherenice tristis. It was first described by Tamerlan Thorell in 1899, and has only been found in Cameroon.
