= Pseudartonis semicoccinea =

Scientific classification
- Domain: Eukaryota
- Kingdom: Animalia
- Phylum: Arthropoda
- Subphylum: Chelicerata
- Class: Arachnida
- Order: Araneae
- Infraorder: Araneomorphae
- Family: Araneidae
- Genus: Pseudartonis
- Species: P. semicoccinea

Binomial name
- Pseudartonis semicoccinea Simon, 1907

Species of spider

Pseudartonis semicoccinea is a spider species of the family Araneidae that is endemic on São Tomé Island. It was first named in 1907 by Eugène Simon.

Its female holotype measures 5 mm.
