= Pitharatus =

Scientific classification
- Domain: Eukaryota
- Kingdom: Animalia
- Phylum: Arthropoda
- Subphylum: Chelicerata
- Class: Arachnida
- Order: Araneae
- Infraorder: Araneomorphae
- Family: Araneidae
- Genus: Pitharatus; Simon, 1895
- Species: P. junghuhni

Binomial name
- Pitharatus junghuhni (Doleschall, 1859)

Synonyms
- Epeira junghuhni Doleschall, 1859

Genus of spiders

Pitharatus is a genus of Southeast Asian orb-weaver spiders containing the single species, Pitharatus junghuhni. It was first described by Eugène Simon in 1895 to contain the single species moved from the now obsolete "catch-all" genus Epeira. It has only been found in Malaysia and Indonesia.
