= Oarces =

Scientific classification
- Kingdom: Animalia
- Phylum: Arthropoda
- Subphylum: Chelicerata
- Class: Arachnida
- Order: Araneae
- Infraorder: Araneomorphae
- Family: Araneidae
- Genus: Oarces; Simon, 1879
- Species: O. reticulatus

Binomial name
- Oarces reticulatus (Nicolet, 1849)

Synonyms
- Arkys reticulatus Nicolet, 1849; Arkys gayi Nicolet, 1849; Arkys piriformis Nicolet, 1849; Arkys flavescens Nicolet, 1849; Arkys liliputanus Nicolet, 1849; Arkys inflatus Nicolet, 1849; Ursa liliputana (Nicolet, 1849)

Oarces is a monotypic genus in the orb-weaver spider family Araneidae. Its only species is Oarces reticulatus. O. reticulatus is native to Chile and Argentina.

== Taxonomy ==
The genus Oarces was first erected by Eugène Simon in 1879 with the type species Arkys reticulatus, first described by Nicolet in 1849, which Simon transferred to his new genus as Oarces reticulatus. Simon synonymized five other species which Nicolet had placed in Arkys with A. reticulatus.

Oarces is the sister genus of Gnolus. Gnolus and Oarces were transferred from the family Mimetidae to Araneidae in 2012.
