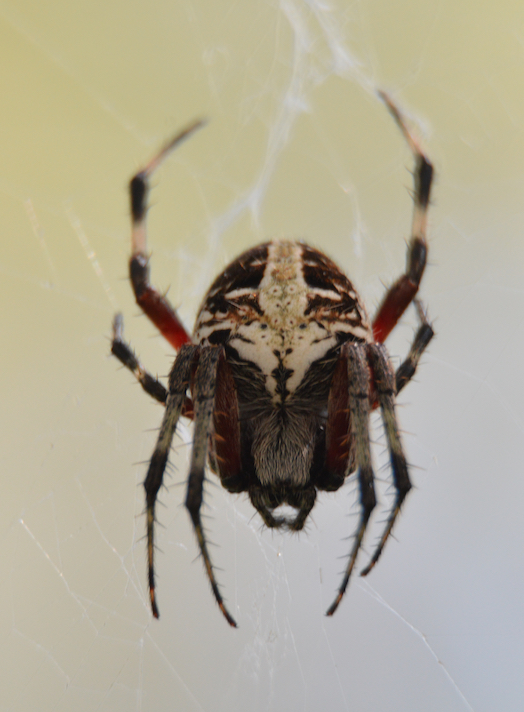
- Female at Fort Clinch State Park in Florida

Scientific classification
- Domain: Eukaryota
- Kingdom: Animalia
- Phylum: Arthropoda
- Subphylum: Chelicerata
- Class: Arachnida
- Order: Araneae
- Infraorder: Araneomorphae
- Family: Araneidae
- Genus: Neoscona
- Species: N. domiciliorum

Binomial name
- Neoscona domiciliorum (Hentz, 1847)

Synonyms
- Araneus benjaminus Petrunkevitch, 1911; Epeira benjamina Mccook, 1894; Epeira benjamini Keyserling, 1892; Epeira domiciliorum Hentz, 1847; Neoscona benjamina F. O. Pickard-Cambridge, 1904

= Neoscona domiciliorum =

Species of spider

Neoscona domiciliorum, commonly known as the spotted orbweaver or redfemured spotted orbweaver, is a spider in the family Araneidae. The specific epithet domiciliorum means "of dwellings" in Latin and refers to the fact that this species is often found living on buildings. Their bites are not known to cause serious harm in humans.

== Description ==
Adults can be identified by a bright white or yellow marking on the back of the abdomen. These markings generally have lateral broad, black stripes on either side with a thin transverse white band near the front making a pale cruciform shape. The first segment of each leg is red while the remaining segments are banded in black and pale gray. The underside is dark with four white spots on the abdomen which is red at the tip. As in other species in the genus Neoscona, there is a characteristic longitudinal groove on the carapace which separates them from species in Araneus.

Females are 7 to 16 millimetres (0.28 to 0.63 in) long and are sparsely covered in short gray hairs. Males are about 8 millimetres (0.31 in) long and have a relatively small, linear abdomen.

== Habitat and distribution ==
It is endemic to the United States, southeast of a line joining Texas, Indiana and Massachusetts. It prefers woodland habitats, particularly moist woods dominated by hardwood trees. Though usually nocturnal, females are commonly found in moist woodlands of Florida throughout the autumn season. They can also be found on buildings, especially under the eaves where they may go unnoticed due to nocturnal habits.

== Webs ==
Webs are placed vertically in trees and shrubs or on buildings. They can be up to 50 centimetres (20 in) in diameter with even longer frame lines attached to shrubs or to the ground. Unlike members of Araneus, the hub is open and is crossed by only one or two threads. It is built by females, and is frequently replaced, being built at dusk and usually taken down before daybreak. Late in the season the web may be left in place during the day, perhaps because the female has greater nutritional needs at this time when she is preparing for egg laying.

A retreat formed of leaves or debris bound together with silk is built near one end of a frame line. This is for use during the day as at night the spider normally occupies the hub of the web and is alert to every tremor.

== Gallery ==
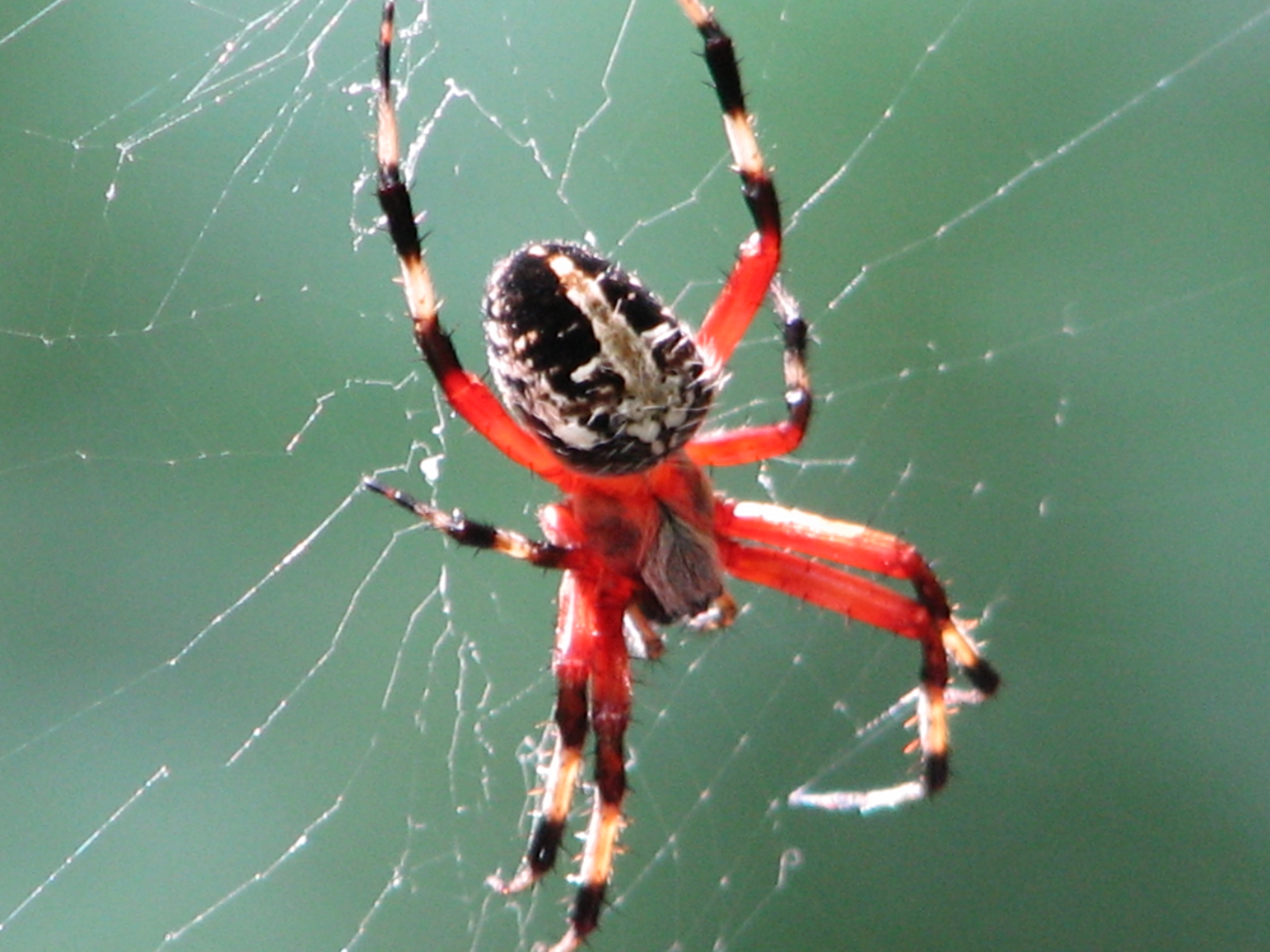
At Congaree National Park, South Carolina

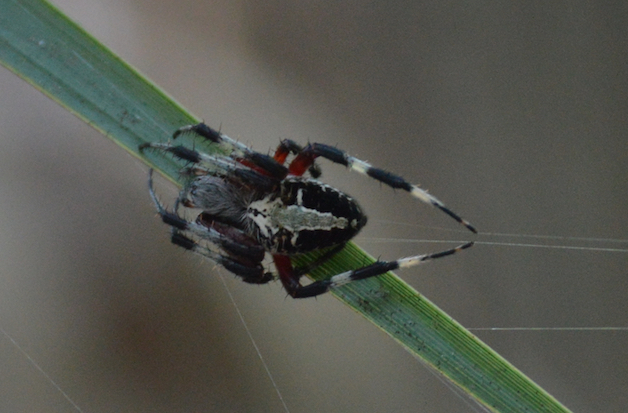
Female in Fernandina Beach, FL
