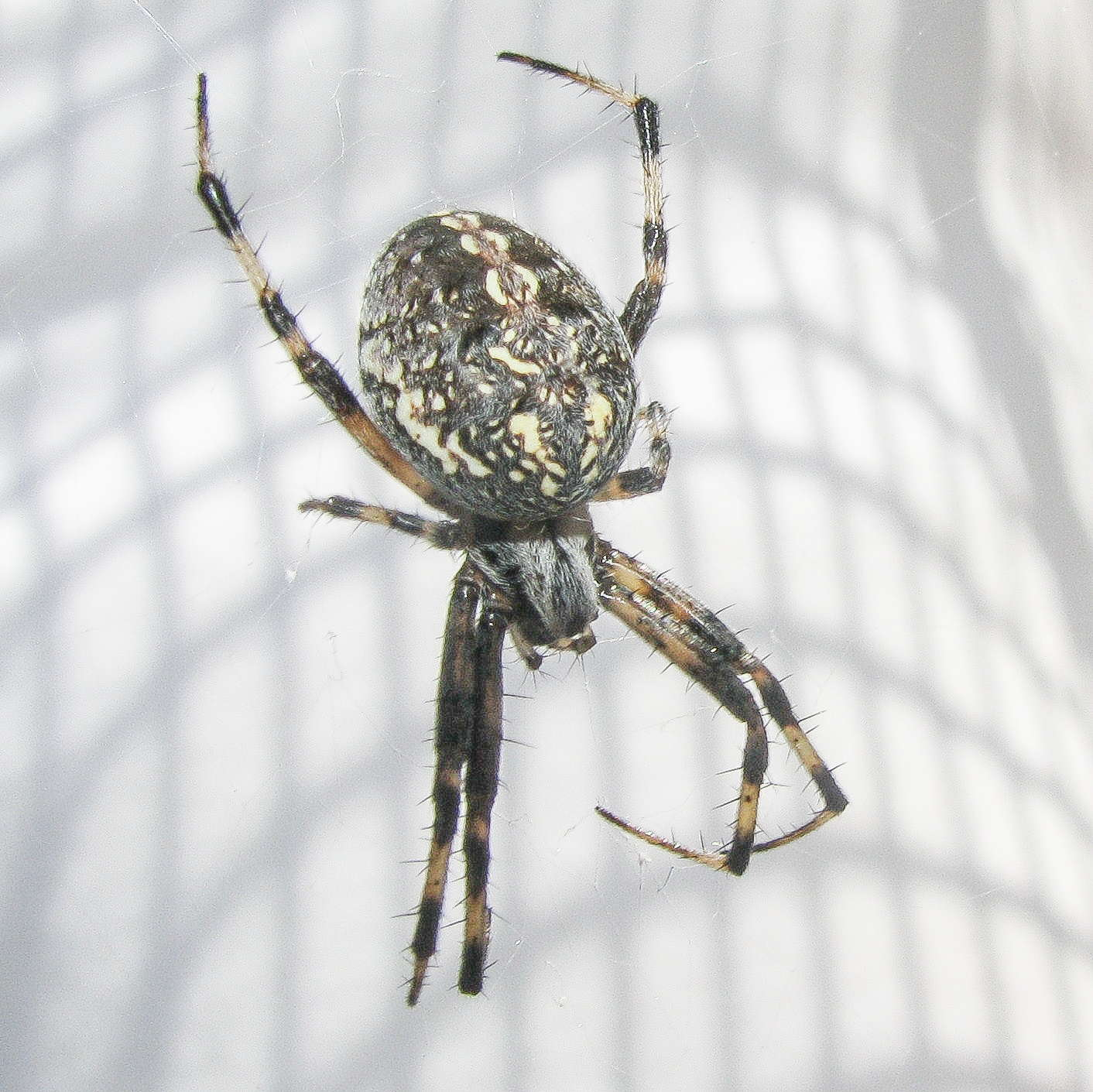
- In Laguna Beach, California

Scientific classification
- Kingdom: Animalia
- Phylum: Arthropoda
- Subphylum: Chelicerata
- Class: Arachnida
- Order: Araneae
- Infraorder: Araneomorphae
- Family: Araneidae
- Genus: Neoscona
- Species: N. oaxacensis

Binomial name
- Neoscona oaxacensis (Keyserling, 1863)

Synonyms
- Epeira oaxacensis Keyserling, 1863; Epeira cooksonii Butler, 1877; Epeira adiantoides Taczanowski, 1878; Neoscona cooksonii (Butler, 1877)

= Neoscona oaxacensis =

Species of spider

Neoscona oaxacensis, known as western spotted orbweaver and zig-zag spider, is a species of spider in the family Araneidae. It is distributed in the Americas, being widespread across Western USA and Mexico and Central America to at least Costa Rica, with sporadic southern reports from Colombia, Venezuela, Ecuador and Peru, including the Galápagos Islands.

== Description ==
Neoscona oaxacensis is a relatively large spider, females being about 9–18 mm (0.35–0.7 in) long overall, with a carapace of about 4–8 mm (0.15–0.3 in) long by 3–6 mm (0.1–0.25 in) wide. Males are smaller, being about 6–13 mm (0.25–0.5 in) long overall, with a carapace of about 3–6 mm (0.1–0.25 in) long by 3–5 mm (0.1–0.2 in) wide. Specimens from the Galápagos are among the largest found. The black-and-white pattern on the upper (dorsal) surface of the abdomen is considered to be distinctive. South American specimens have a more slender abdomen than North American ones, with a more distinct light central band, which has a wavy border. Females have an epigyne appearing 2.5 times as long as wide when viewed from the rear. Once sexually mature, males have a modified terminal palp with an S-shaped conductor.

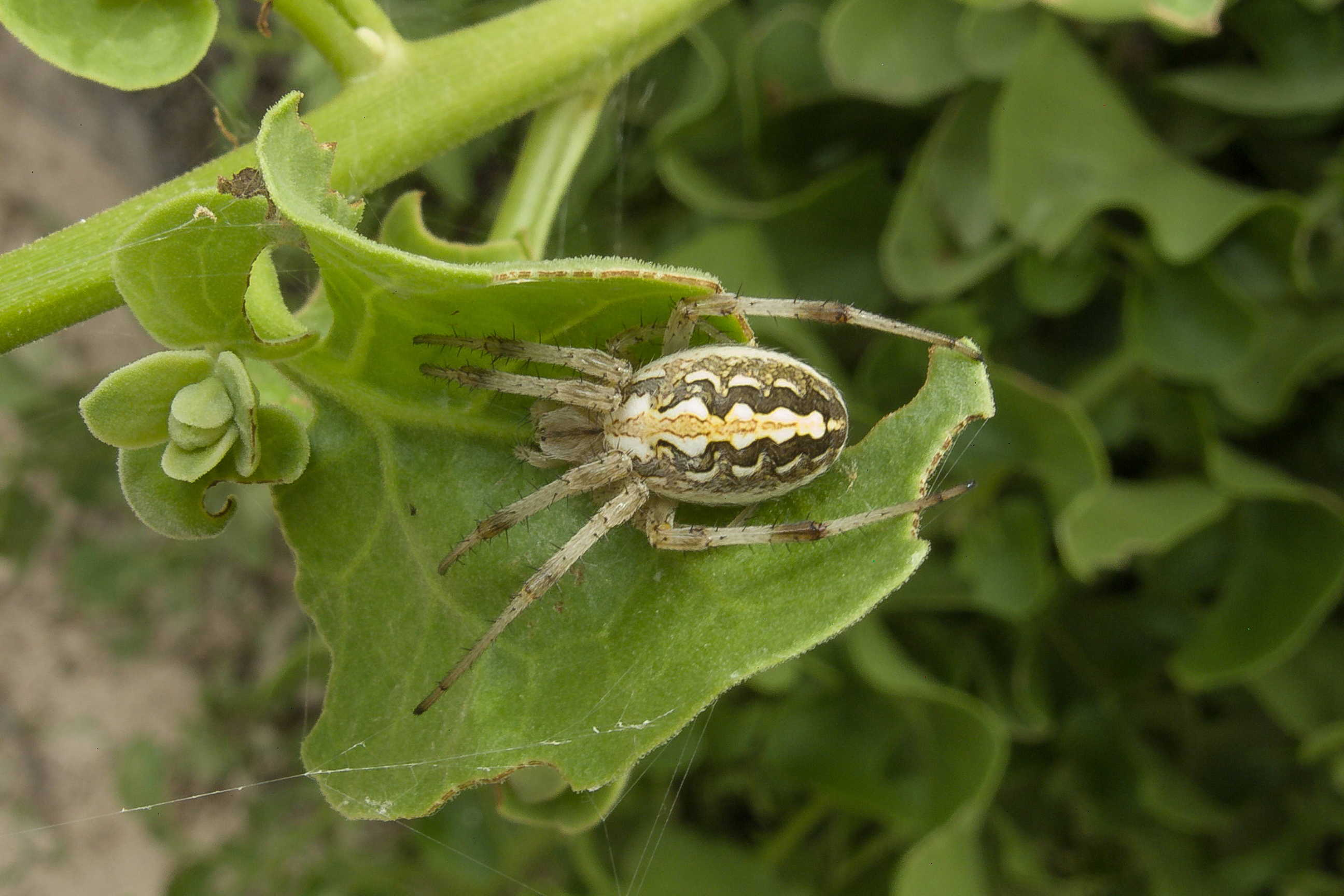
Paler form from Santa Fé, Galapagos

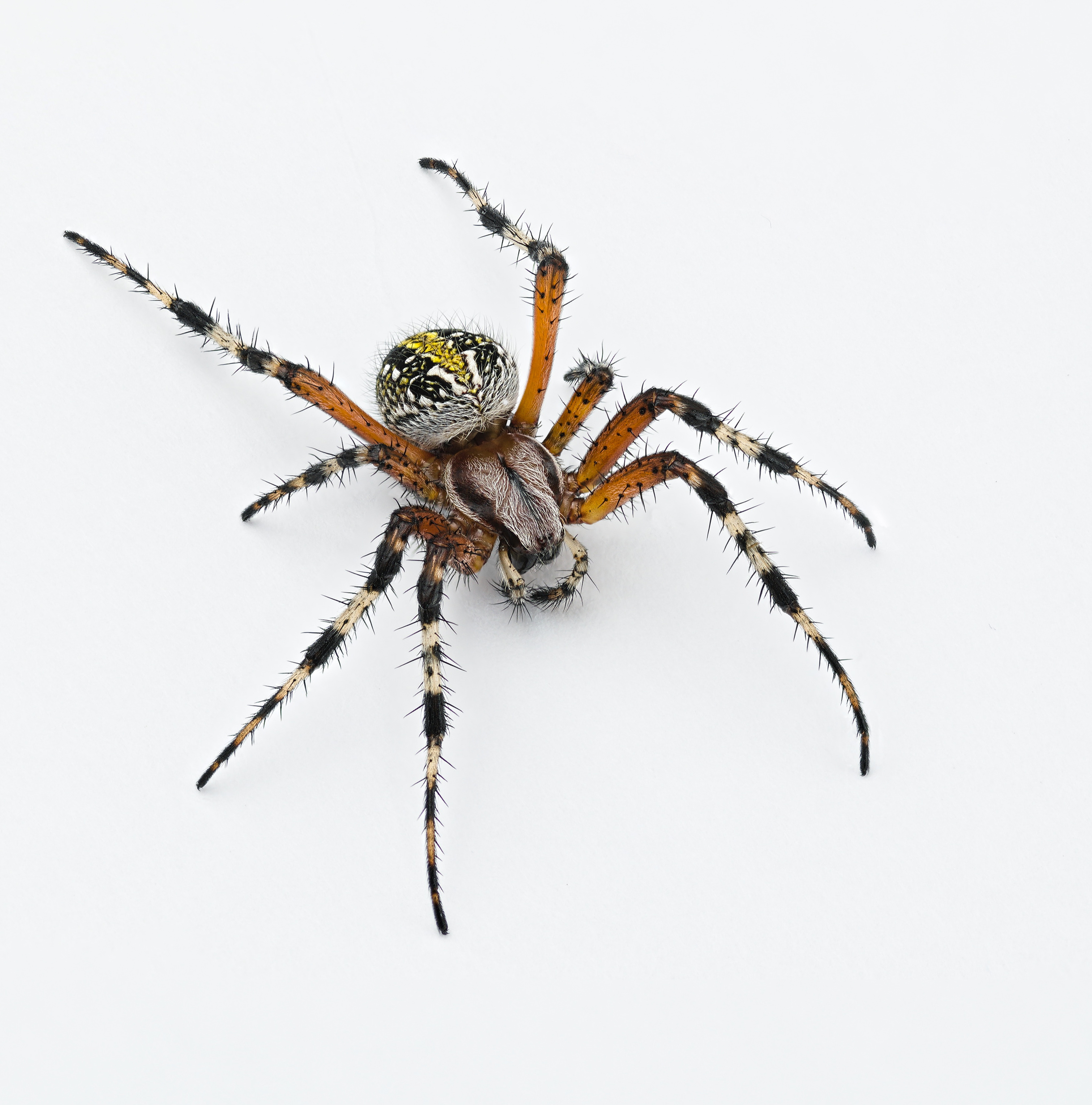
From Coacalco, Mexico

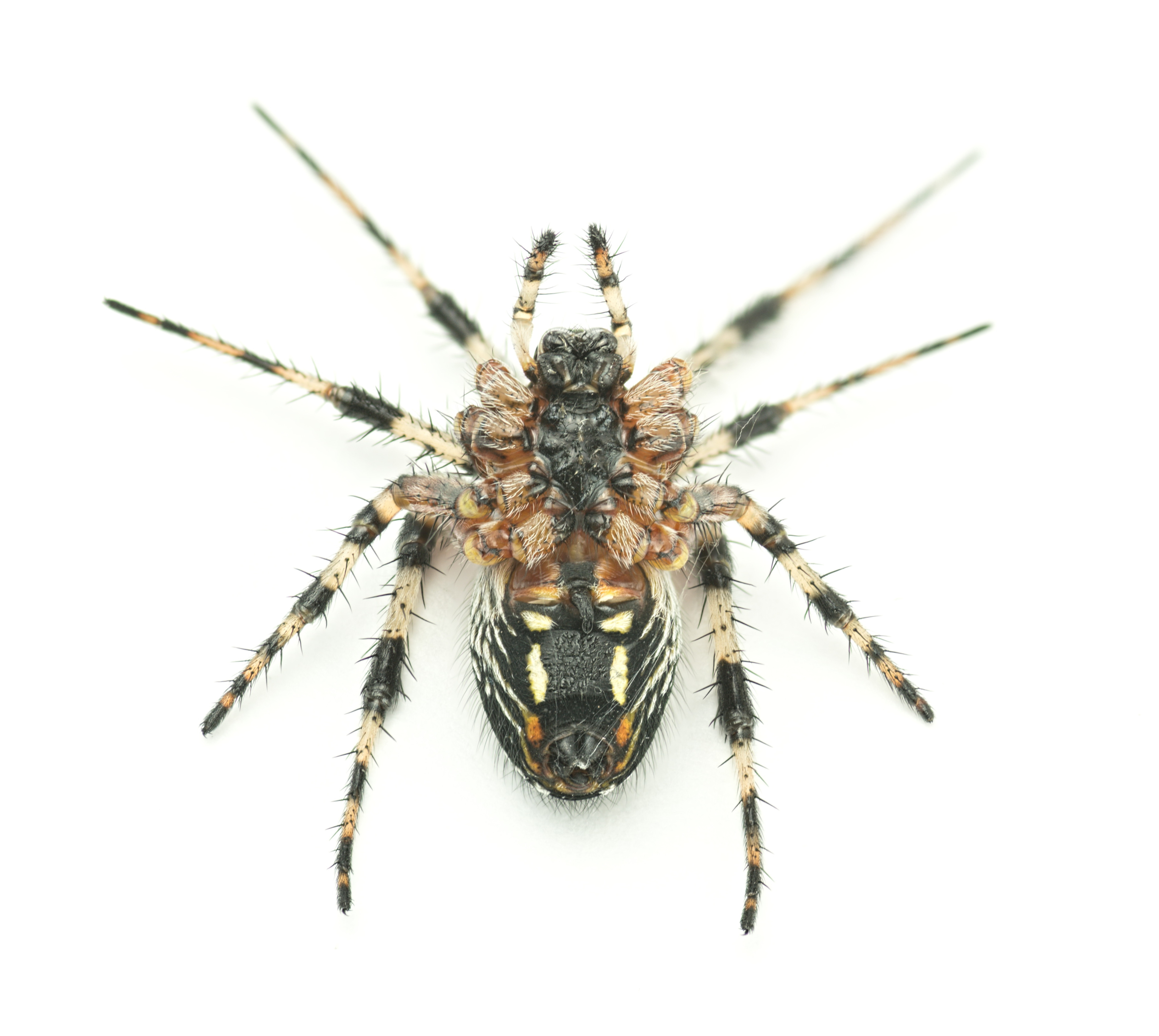
View from below

== Taxonomy ==
The species was first described by Eugen Keyserling in 1863, as Epeira oaxacensis. The specific name oaxacensis refers to Keyserling's description of its origin as Oaxaca, Mexico. (The Latin ending -ensis is commonly added to a place name to mean "originating from".) The genus Epeira was divided by Eugène Simon in 1864, one of the divisions being Neoscona. F.O. Pickard-Cambridge placed Epeira oaxacensis in Neoscona in 1904. When found in the Galápagos Islands, some have been referred to as Neoscona cooksonii and even claimed as endemic, but are elsewhere the name is typically regarded as a junior synonym of N. oaxacensis.
