= Sedasta =

Scientific classification
- Kingdom: Animalia
- Phylum: Arthropoda
- Subphylum: Chelicerata
- Class: Arachnida
- Order: Araneae
- Infraorder: Araneomorphae
- Family: Araneidae
- Genus: Sedasta; Simon, 1894
- Species: S. ferox

Binomial name
- Sedasta ferox Simon, 1894

Genus of spiders

Sedasta is a genus of African orb-weaver spiders containing the single species, Sedasta ferox. It was first described by Eugène Simon in 1894, and has only been found in West Africa. It was originally placed with the tangle-web spiders, and though was moved to the orb-weavers in 1985, it is still sometimes considered to be a theridiid or a long-jawed orb weaver.
