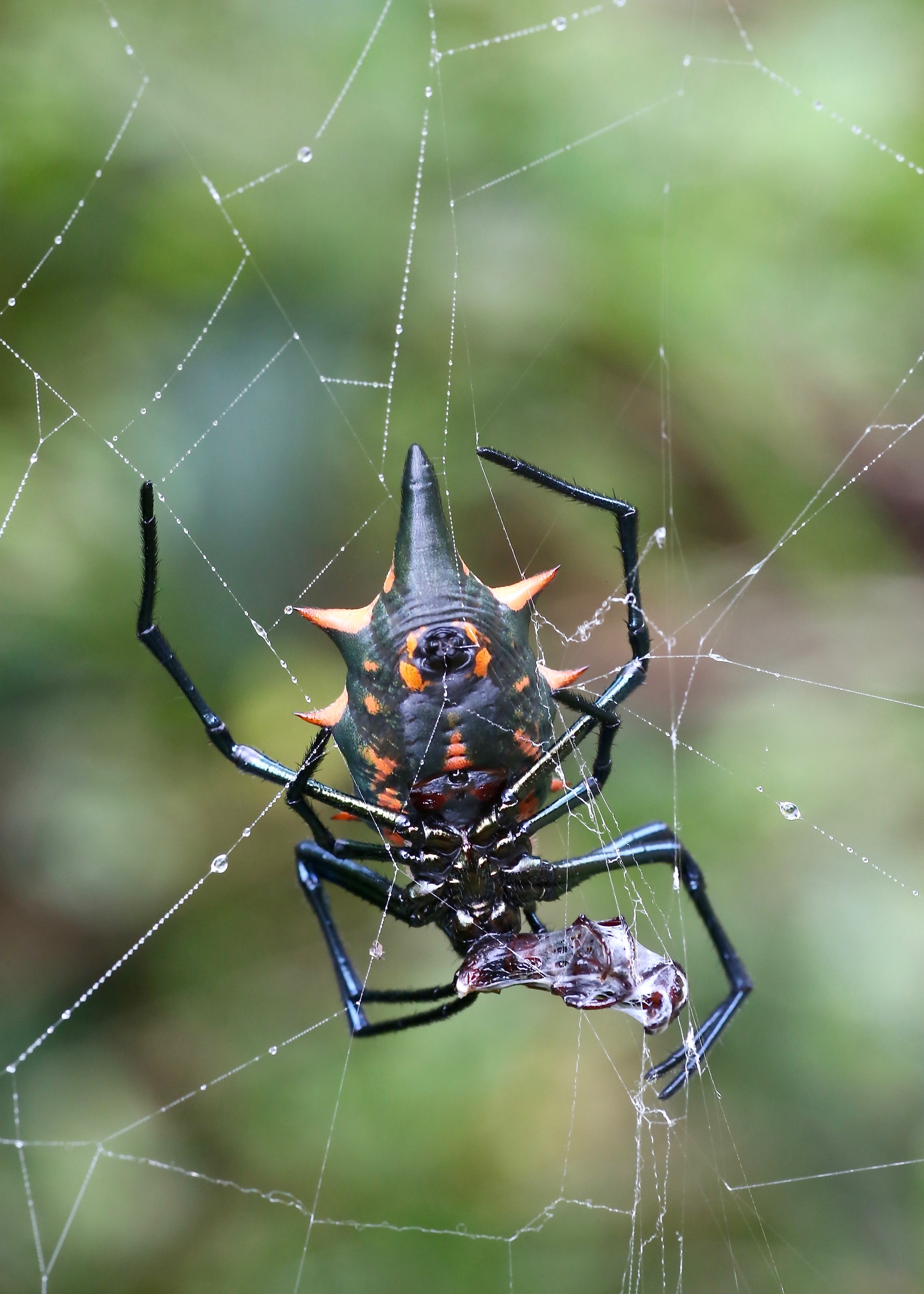

Scientific classification
- Kingdom: Animalia
- Phylum: Arthropoda
- Subphylum: Chelicerata
- Class: Arachnida
- Order: Araneae
- Infraorder: Araneomorphae
- Family: Araneidae
- Genus: Rubrepeira; Levi, 1992
- Species: R. rubronigra

Binomial name
- Rubrepeira rubronigra (Mello-Leitão, 1939)

= Rubrepeira =

Genus of spiders

Rubrepeira is a genus of orb-weaver spiders containing the single species, Rubrepeira rubronigra. It was first described by Herbert Walter Levi in 1992, found from Mexico to Brazil.
