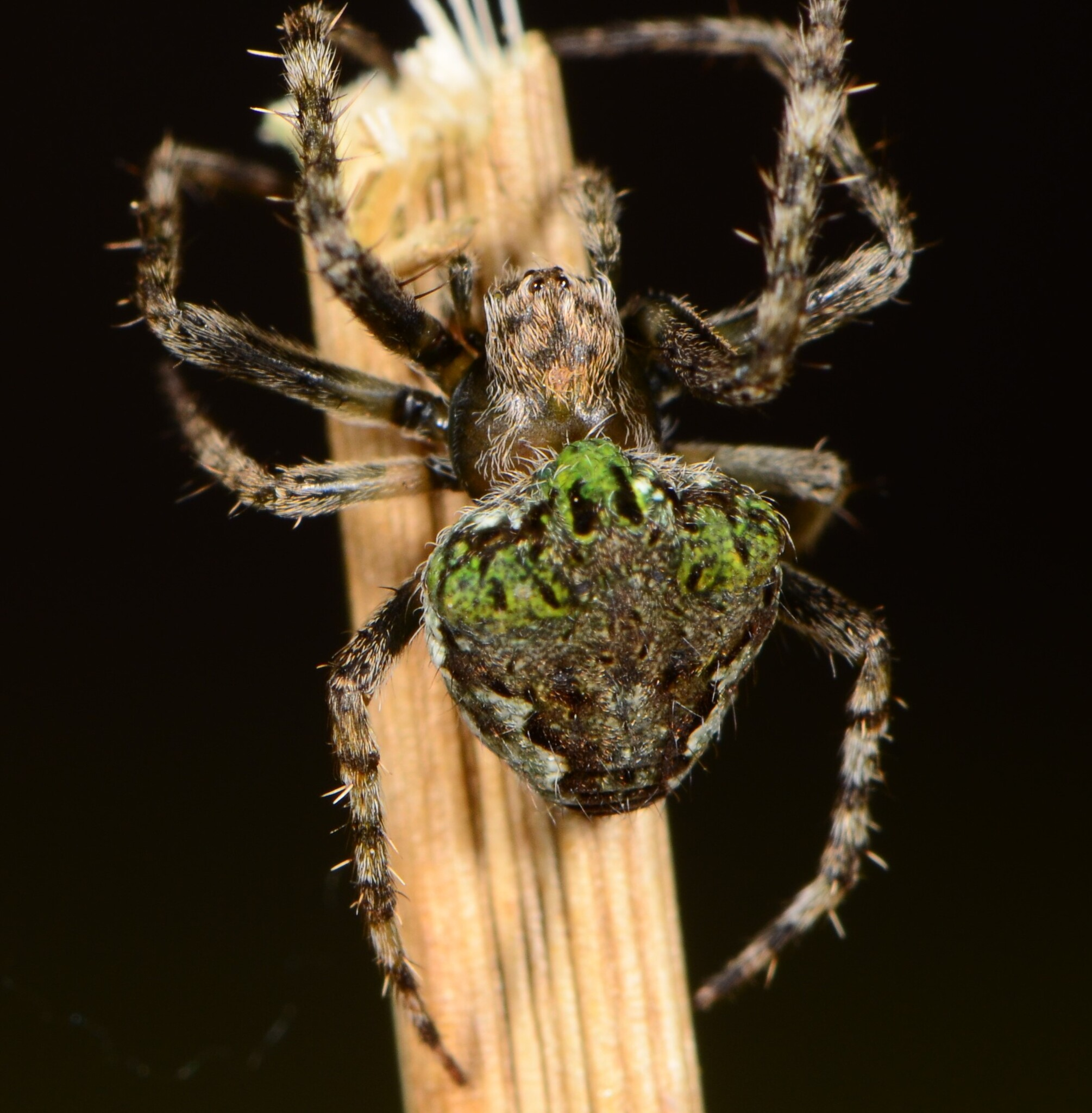

Scientific classification
- Kingdom: Animalia
- Phylum: Arthropoda
- Subphylum: Chelicerata
- Class: Arachnida
- Order: Araneae
- Infraorder: Araneomorphae
- Family: Araneidae
- Genus: Neoscona
- Species: N. quincasea

Binomial name
- Neoscona quincasea Roberts, 1983

= Neoscona quincasea =

Neoscona Orb-Web Spider

Species of spider

Neoscona quincasea is a species of spider in the family Araneidae. It is an endemic species to Africa.

== Distribution ==
Neoscona quincasea is recorded from eight countries in the Afrotropical Region: Aldabra and Assumption Island, Democratic Republic of the Congo, Kenya, Malawi, Rwanda, Namibia, and South Africa.

In South Africa, the species is recorded from seven provinces and occurs in more than 10 protected areas at altitudes ranging from 54 to 1,557 m above sea level.

== Habitat and ecology ==
Neoscona quincasea makes orb-webs in vegetation at night. The species has been sampled from the Fynbos, Forest, Grassland, Nama Karoo, and Savanna biomes. It is also sampled from pine plantations and vineyards, and is associated with the bark of Vachellia xanthophloea trees in Ndumo Game Reserve.

== Description ==
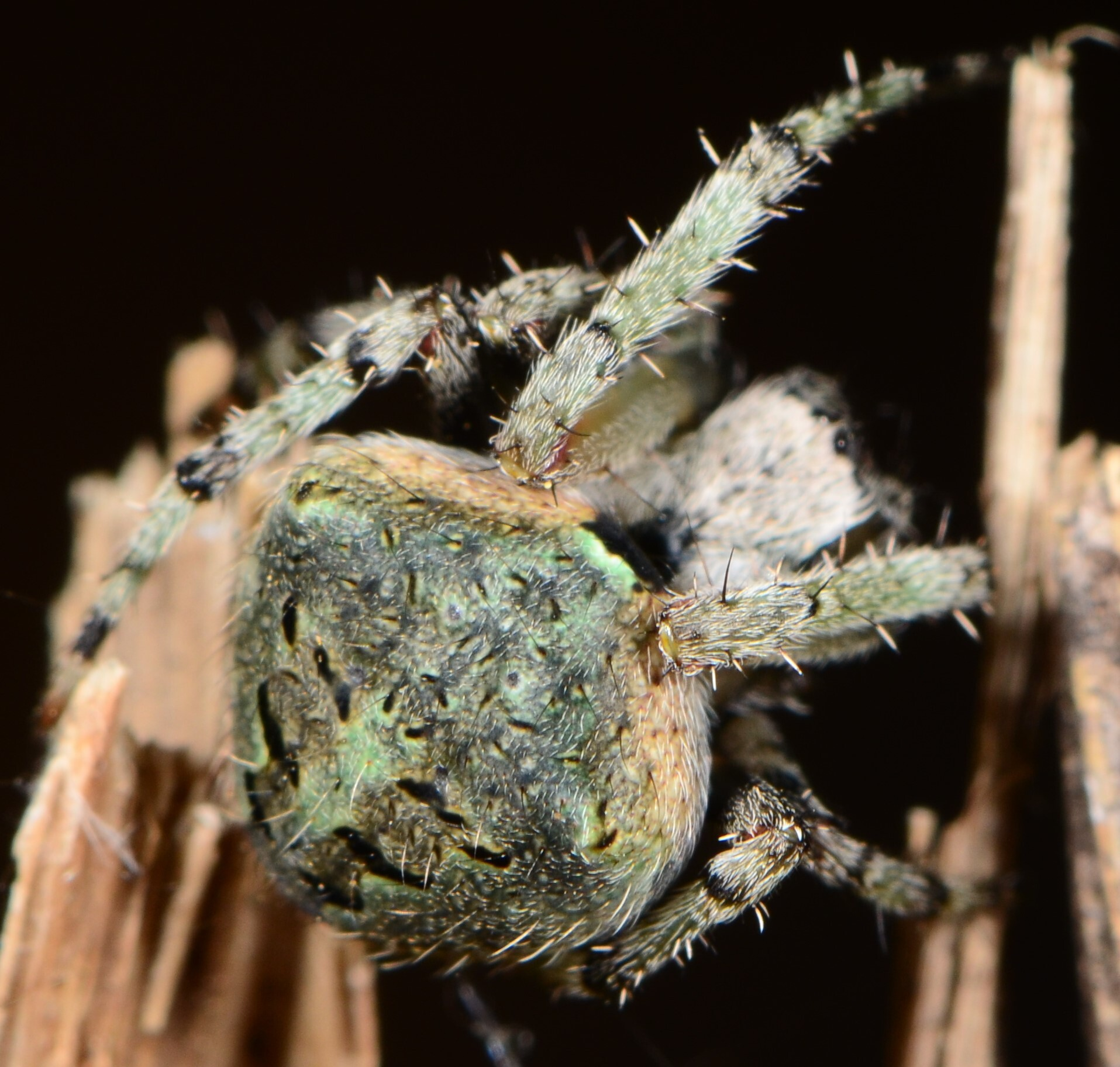
female

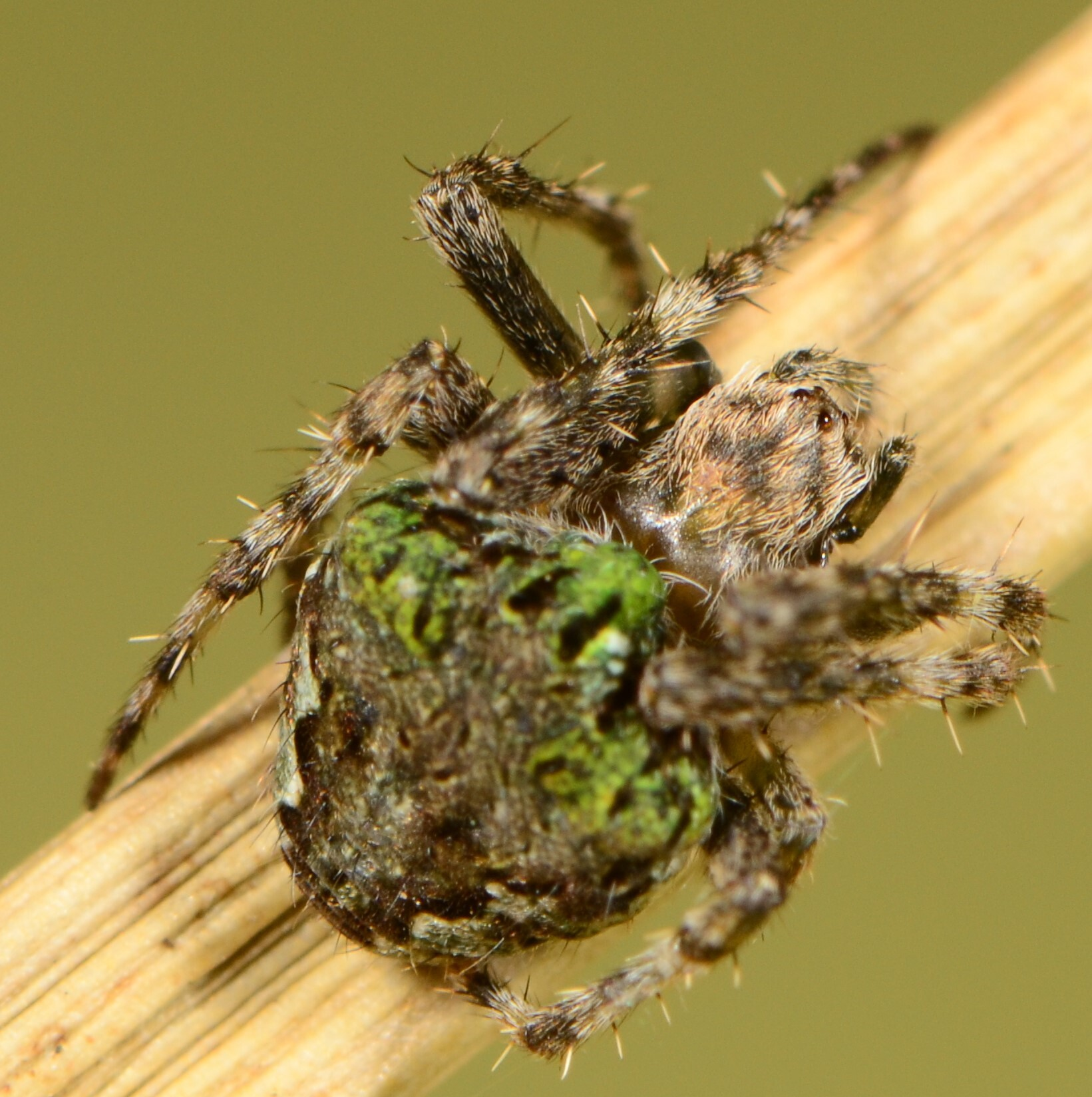
female

Neoscona quincasea is known from both sexes. These are small spiders measuring 4.5-7.0 mm in body length.

== Conservation ==
Neoscona quincasea is listed as Least Concern by the South African National Biodiversity Institute due to its wide geographical range. There are no significant threats to the species. The species has been sampled from more than 10 protected areas including Polokwane Nature Reserve, Swartberg Nature Reserve, and Tembe Elephant Park.

== Taxonomy ==
The species was described by Roberts in 1983 from the Aldabra Atoll. It was revised by Grasshoff in 1986.
