= Pseudopsyllo =

Scientific classification
- Kingdom: Animalia
- Phylum: Arthropoda
- Subphylum: Chelicerata
- Class: Arachnida
- Order: Araneae
- Infraorder: Araneomorphae
- Family: Araneidae
- Genus: Pseudopsyllo; Strand, 1916
- Species: P. scutigera

Binomial name
- Pseudopsyllo scutigera Strand, 1916

Genus of spiders

Pseudopsyllo is a genus of Central African orb-weaver spiders containing the single species, Pseudopsyllo scutigera. It was first described by Embrik Strand in 1916, and has only been found in Cameroon.
