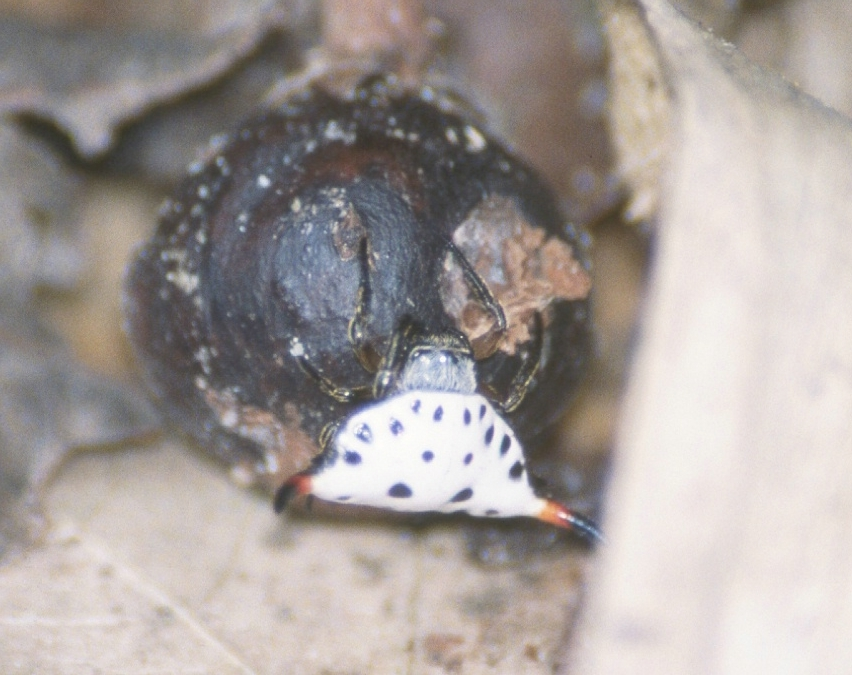

Scientific classification
- Kingdom: Animalia
- Phylum: Arthropoda
- Subphylum: Chelicerata
- Class: Arachnida
- Order: Araneae
- Infraorder: Araneomorphae
- Family: Araneidae
- Genus: Togacantha; Dahl, 1914
- Species: T. nordviei

Binomial name
- Togacantha nordviei (Strand, 1913)

Synonyms
- Gasteracantha nordviei; Strand, 1913

= Togacantha =

Genus of spiders

Togacantha is a genus of orb-weaver spiders found in Africa. It is monotypic and contains the single species Togacantha nordviei. It was first described as a subgenus of Gasteracantha by Friedrich Dahl in 1914, and was later elevated to genus status. Only the female was known until a male was found and described in 1982.
