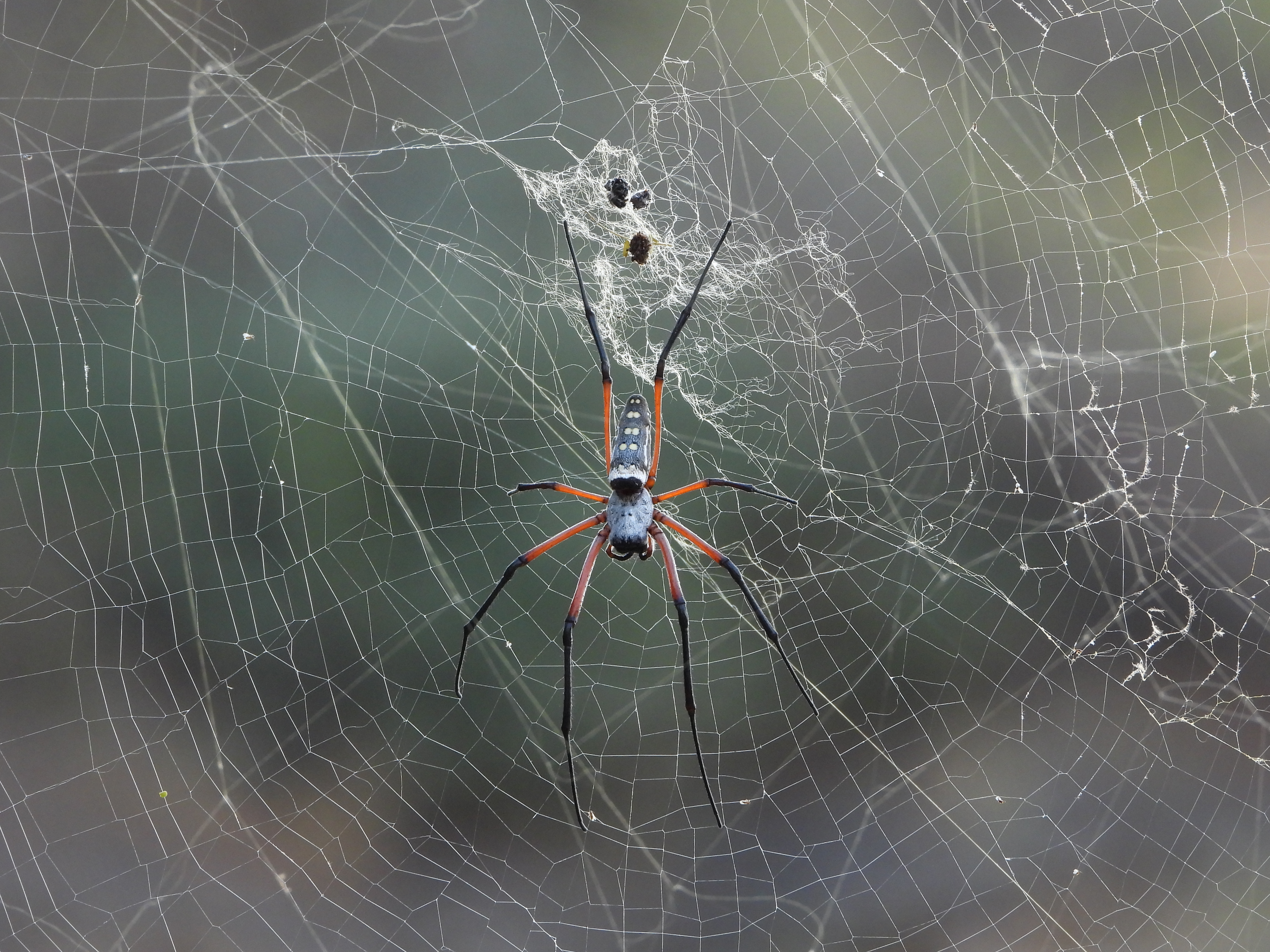

Scientific classification
- Kingdom: Animalia
- Phylum: Arthropoda
- Subphylum: Chelicerata
- Class: Arachnida
- Order: Araneae
- Infraorder: Araneomorphae
- Family: Nephilidae
- Genus: Nephila
- Species: N. sumptuosa

Binomial name
- Nephila sumptuosa Gerstäcker, 1873

Synonyms
- Nephila amoenula Gerstäcker, 1873; Nephila bennetti O. Pickard-Cambridge, 1898

= Nephila sumptuosa =

Species of spider

Nephila sumptuosa, the red-legged golden orb-web spider, is a species of golden orb-web spider.

== Description ==
Nephila sumptuosa can reach a length of 4.4 millimetres (0.17 in) in males, of 34.9 millimetres (1.37 in) in females. These large spiders have long reddish legs with clumps of hair. The abdomen is blackish and shows a series of whitish spots.

As is usual among orb-weavers, there is marked sexual dimorphism in general appearance, but especially in size.

== Distribution ==
This species is present in East Africa and in Socotra.

== Bibliography ==
- Gerstäcker, A. (1873) Arachnoidea., In von der Decken, C. (ed.), Reisen in Ostafrica. Leipzig, 3(2): 461-503 (Araneae, pp. 473–503).
- Pickard-Cambridge, O. (1898b). Arachnida. In: Dixey, F., Mal Burr, & O. Pickard-Cambridge (eds.) On a collection of insects and arachnids made by Mr E. N. Bennett in Socotra, with descriptions of new species. Proceedings of the Zoological Society of London 1898, 387-391
- Platnick, Norman I. 2011. The World Spider Catalog, v.11.0. American Museum of Natural History. Database built by Robert J. Raven
- Pocock, R. I. (1903g). Arachnida. In: Forbes, H. O. (ed.) The Natural History of Sokotra and Abd-el-Kuri. Special Bulletin of the Liverpool Museum, pp. 175–208.
