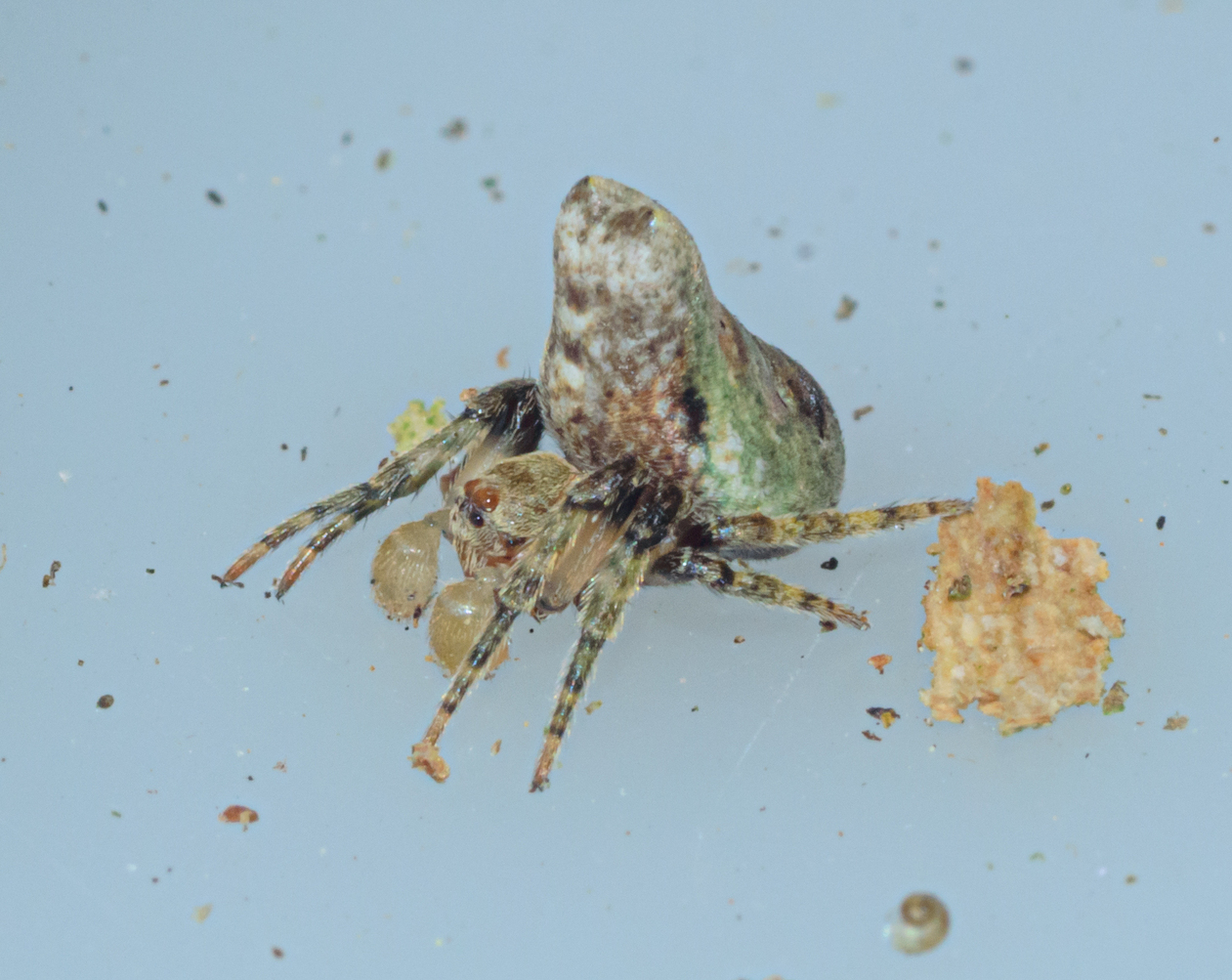
- W. abdominalis in Brazil

Scientific classification
- Kingdom: Animalia
- Phylum: Arthropoda
- Subphylum: Chelicerata
- Class: Arachnida
- Order: Araneae
- Infraorder: Araneomorphae
- Family: Araneidae
- Genus: Wixia; O. Pickard-Cambridge, 1882
- Species: W. abdominalis

Binomial name
- Wixia abdominalis O. Pickard-Cambridge, 1882

= Wixia =

Genus of spiders

Wixia is a genus of South American orb-weaver spiders first described by O. Pickard-Cambridge in 1882, containing the single species, Wixia abdominalis. The genus used to contain more species, but they have all been moved, dispersed between Ocrepeira, Alpaida, and several other genera.
