= Nemospiza =

Scientific classification
- Kingdom: Animalia
- Phylum: Arthropoda
- Subphylum: Chelicerata
- Class: Arachnida
- Order: Araneae
- Infraorder: Araneomorphae
- Family: Araneidae
- Genus: Nemospiza
- Species: N. conspicillata

Binomial name
- Nemospiza conspicillata Simon, 1903

Species of spider

Nemospiza conspicillata is a rare species of spider in the family Araneidae. It is the type species of the genus Nemospiza.

== Distribution ==
Nemospiza conspicillata is a South African endemic described from the Transvaal region. The species is known only from one locality, Makalali Nature Reserve in Limpopo, at an altitude of 457 m above sea level.

== Habitat and ecology ==
Nemospiza conspicillata is known from the Savanna biome.

== Description ==
The female has a body length of 3 mm. The carapace is smooth and hairless, olive green with black reticulation.

== Conservation ==
Nemospiza conspicillata is listed as Data Deficient for Taxonomic reasons. Too little is known about the location, lifestyle and threats of this taxon for a full assessment to be made. Identification of the species is also problematic. Conservation measures are unknown.

== Taxonomy ==
Nemospiza conspicillata is the type species of the genus Nemospiza, which was established by Simon in 1903. The species has not been revised and is known only from the female, which has not been illustrated.
