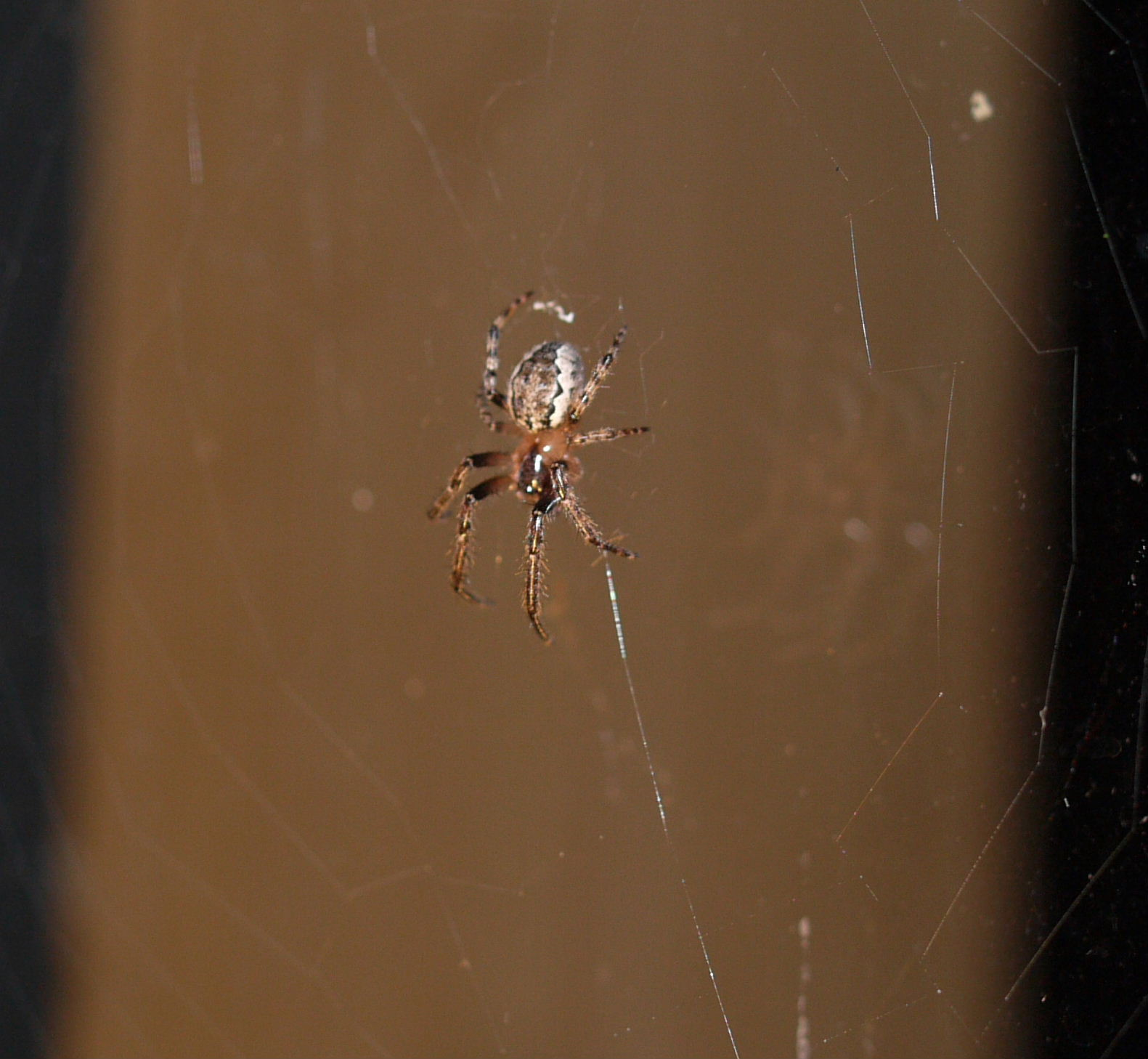

Scientific classification
- Kingdom: Animalia
- Phylum: Arthropoda
- Subphylum: Chelicerata
- Class: Arachnida
- Order: Araneae
- Infraorder: Araneomorphae
- Family: Araneidae
- Genus: Yaginumia; Archer, 1960
- Species: Y. sia

Binomial name
- Yaginumia sia (Strand, 1906)

= Yaginumia =

Genus of spiders

Yaginumia is a genus of Asian orb-weaver spiders described by Allan Frost Archer to hold the single species, Yaginumia sia. This species was moved from Aranea to Zygiella in 1942, before moving to this genus in 1960. It has only been found in China, Korea, Taiwan, and Japan.
