= Spinepeira =

Scientific classification
- Domain: Eukaryota
- Kingdom: Animalia
- Phylum: Arthropoda
- Subphylum: Chelicerata
- Class: Arachnida
- Order: Araneae
- Infraorder: Araneomorphae
- Family: Araneidae
- Genus: Spinepeira; Levi, 1995
- Species: S. schlingeri

Binomial name
- Spinepeira schlingeri Levi, 1995

Genus of spiders

Spinepeira is a genus of South American orb-weaver spiders containing the single species, Spinepeira schlingeri. It was first described by Herbert Walter Levi in 1995, and has only been found in Peru.
