= Perilla teres =

Scientific classification
- Kingdom: Animalia
- Phylum: Arthropoda
- Subphylum: Chelicerata
- Class: Arachnida
- Order: Araneae
- Infraorder: Araneomorphae
- Family: Araneidae
- Genus: Perilla; Thorell, 1895
- Species: P. teres

Binomial name
- Perilla teres Thorell, 1895

Genus of spiders

Perilla teres is a species of Southeast Asian orb-weaver spiders. It is the only species in the genus Perilla. It was first described by Tamerlan Thorell in 1895, and has only been found in Myanmar, Vietnam, and Malaysia.
