= Poecilarcys =

Scientific classification
- Kingdom: Animalia
- Phylum: Arthropoda
- Subphylum: Chelicerata
- Class: Arachnida
- Order: Araneae
- Infraorder: Araneomorphae
- Family: Araneidae
- Genus: Poecilarcys; Simon, 1895
- Species: P. ditissimus

Binomial name
- Poecilarcys ditissimus (Simon, 1885)

Genus of spiders

Poecilarcys is a genus of African orb-weaver spiders containing the single species, Poecilarcys ditissimus. It was first described by Eugène Simon in 1895 to hold the single species moved from the now obsolete "catch-all" genus Epeira. It has only been found in Tunisia.
