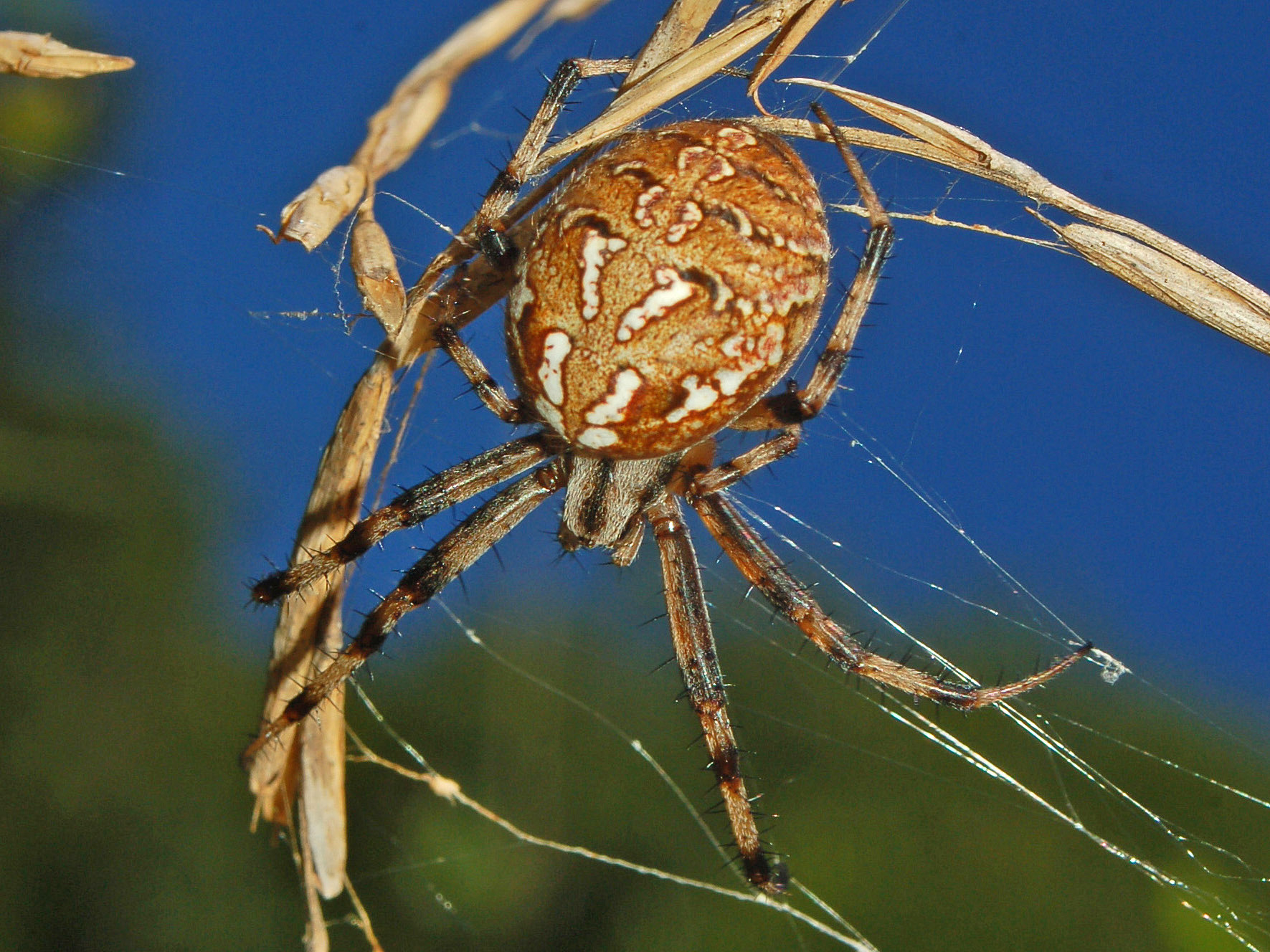
- In Italy

Scientific classification
- Kingdom: Animalia
- Phylum: Arthropoda
- Subphylum: Chelicerata
- Class: Arachnida
- Order: Araneae
- Infraorder: Araneomorphae
- Family: Araneidae
- Genus: Neoscona
- Species: N. byzanthina

Binomial name
- Neoscona byzanthina (Pavesi, 1876)

Synonyms
- Epeira byzanthina Pavesi, 1876

= Neoscona byzanthina =

Species of spider

Neoscona byzanthina is an orb-weaver spider.

== Distribution and habitat ==
This species occurs in France, Italy, Spain, southern European Russia and Turkey. These spiders mainly occur on low bushes and herbs.

== Description ==
Neoscona byzanthina can reach a body length of about 5 mm (0.20 in) in males, of about 7 mm (0.28 in) in females. Cephalothorax (prosoma) is yellowish or light beige, covered with fine white hairs and with a dark brown longitudinal median stripe and two lateral stripes. The opisthosoma is brown and the dorsal design is rather variable. Usually it shows discontinuous brown bands with white markings bordered with brown lines. The hook of the epigyne is elongated and rounded. Legs are pale brown or yellowish and very darkly ringed. In particular, the apical ends of the femurs are quite dark.

This species is very similar to Neoscona adianta, but the size of Neoscona byzanthina individuals and the size of their genitals are rather larger than in Neoscona adianta.

== Biology ==
Adults are more frequent on August and September.
