= Neoscona chiarinii =

Chiarini's Neoscona Orb-Web Spider

Conservation status
- Least Concern (SANBI Red List)

Scientific classification
- Kingdom: Animalia
- Phylum: Arthropoda
- Subphylum: Chelicerata
- Class: Arachnida
- Order: Araneae
- Infraorder: Araneomorphae
- Family: Araneidae
- Genus: Neoscona
- Species: N. chiarinii

Binomial name
- Neoscona chiarinii (Pavesi, 1883)

Synonyms
- Araneus accentuatus Thorell, 1899; Araneus potteri Simon, 1901; Araneus lapillulus Simon, 1907; Araneus mutilatus Caporiacco, 1947

Species of spider

Neoscona chiarinii is a species of spider in the family Araneidae. It is commonly known as Chiarini's Neoscona orb-web spider and is an endemic species to Africa.

== Distribution ==
Neoscona chiarinii is known from eight African countries: Burundi, Cameroon, Democratic Republic of the Congo, Rwanda, Tanzania, Zimbabwe, and Uganda. The species also occurs in South Africa.

In South Africa, the species has been recorded from two provinces: KwaZulu-Natal (Tembe Elephant Park) and Mpumalanga (Dullstroom).

== Habitat and ecology ==
Neoscona chiarinii are orb-web spiders that make orb-webs at night in vegetation and remove them early in the morning. The species has been sampled from the Grassland and Savanna biomes.

== Description ==
Neoscona chiarinii is known from both sexes.

== Conservation ==
Neoscona chiarinii is listed as Least Concern by the South African National Biodiversity Institute due to its wide geographical range in Africa. The species is protected in Tembe Elephant Park. There are no known threats to the species.

== Taxonomy ==
The species was originally described by Pavesi in 1883 from Ethiopia as Epeira chiarinii. It was revised by Grasshoff in 1986, who synonymized several species including Araneus accentuatus, A. lapillulus, A. mutilatus, and A. potteri.
