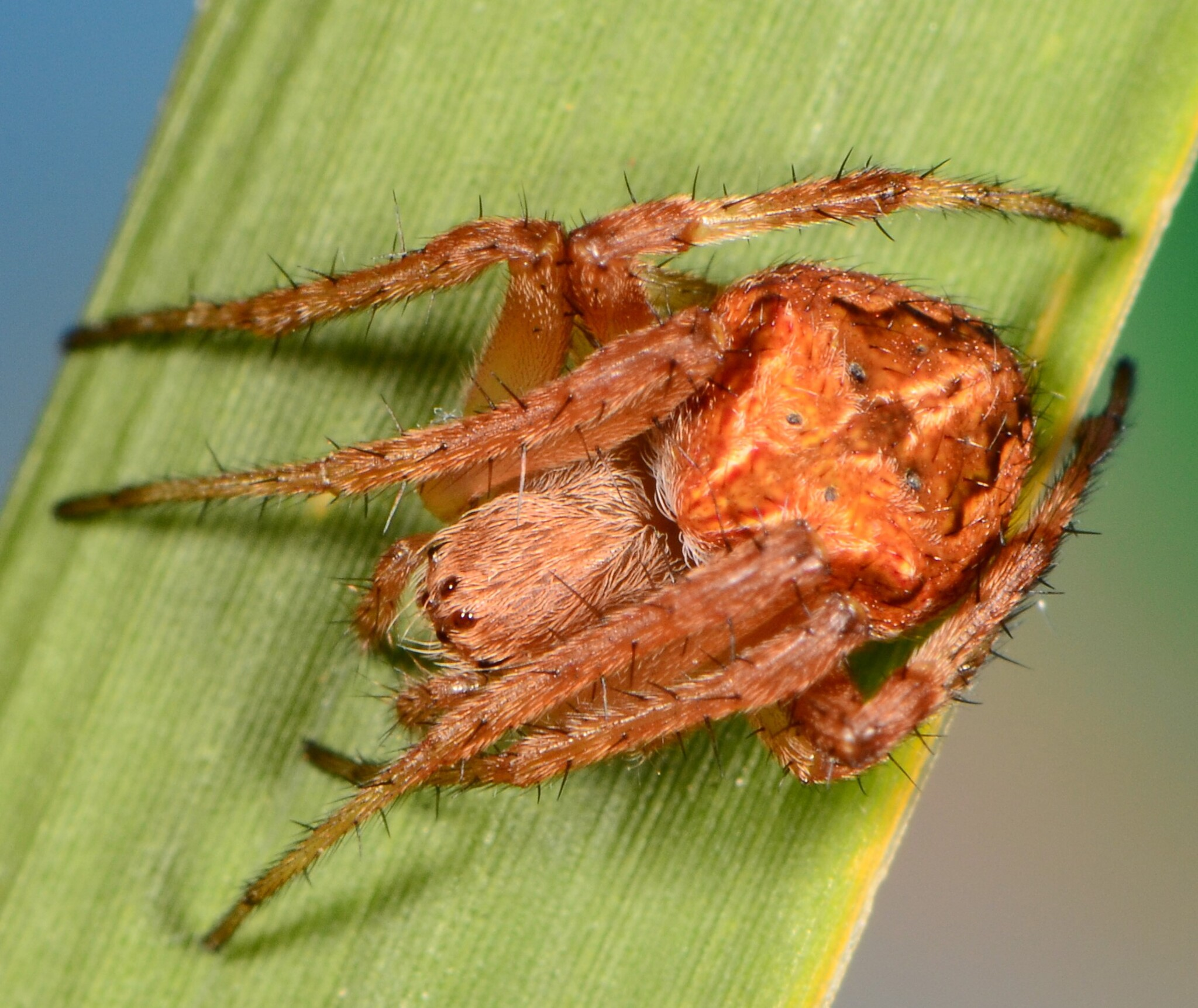
- Female
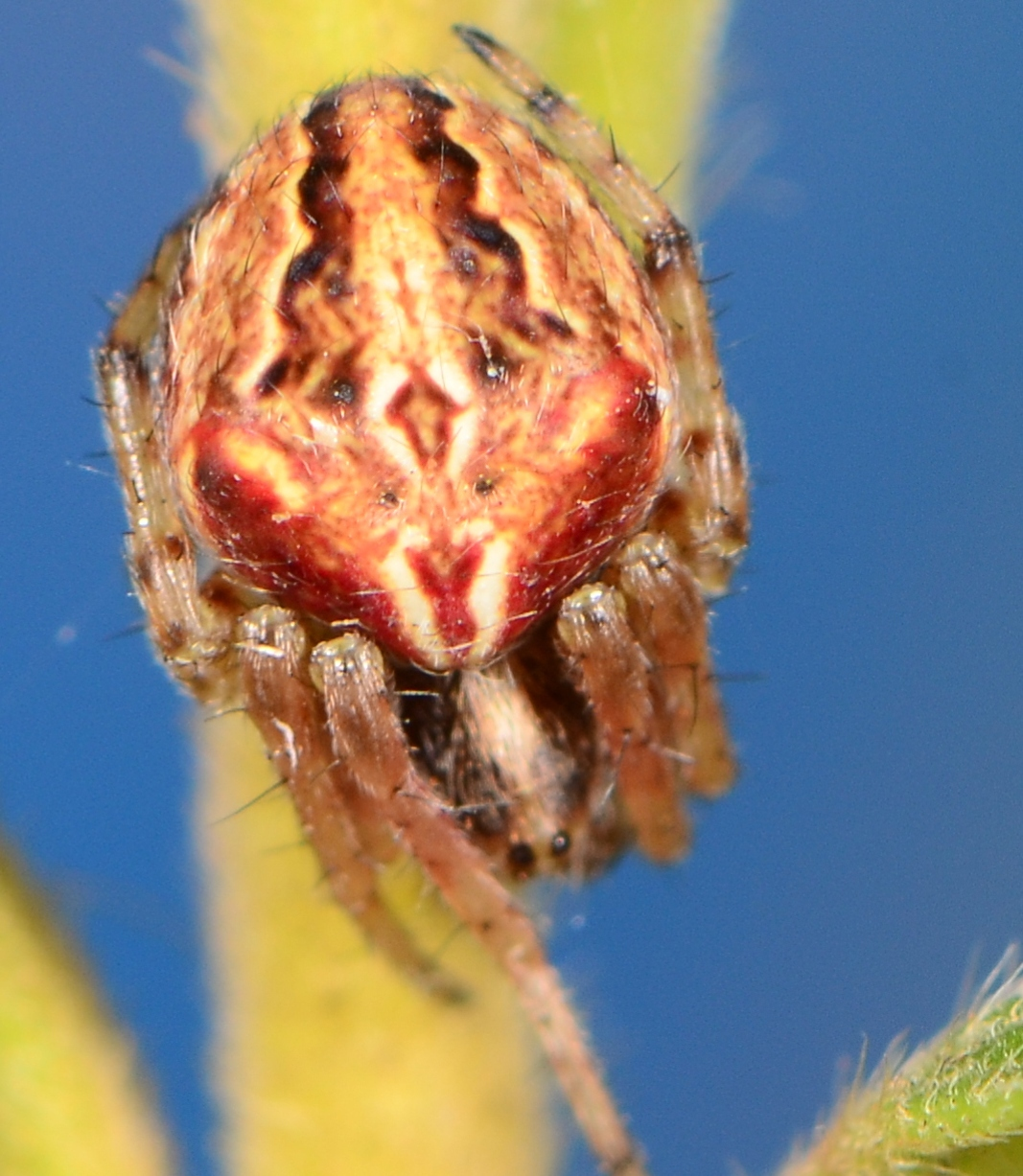
- Female

Scientific classification
- Kingdom: Animalia
- Phylum: Arthropoda
- Subphylum: Chelicerata
- Class: Arachnida
- Order: Araneae
- Infraorder: Araneomorphae
- Family: Araneidae
- Genus: Neoscona
- Species: N. novella

Binomial name
- Neoscona novella (Simon, 1907)

= Neoscona novella =

Neoscona Orb-Web Spider

Species of spider

Neoscona novella is a species of spider in the family Araneidae. It is an endemic species to Africa.

== Distribution ==
Neoscona novella is known from Equatorial Guinea (Bioko) and South Africa.

In South Africa, the species is known from five provinces at altitudes ranging from 62 to 1,369 m above sea level. These include Eastern Cape (Baviaanskloof Nature Reserve), Limpopo, North West, Northern Cape, and Western Cape (Cape Town).

== Habitat and ecology ==
Neoscona novella consists of small orb-web spiders that make orb-webs in vegetation at night and remove them early in the morning. The species has been sampled from the Fynbos, Savanna, and Nama Karoo biomes.

== Description ==
Neoscona novella is known only from the female. It is a small orb-web spider that constructs webs in vegetation.

== Conservation ==
Neoscona novella is listed as Least Concern by the South African National Biodiversity Institute because it occurs over a large area. There are no known threats to the species. The species is protected in Baviaanskloof Nature Reserve, Mogalakwena Nature Reserve, and Rooipoort Game Reserve.

== Taxonomy ==
The species was originally described by Eugène Simon in 1907 from Bioko as Araneus novellus. It was revised by Grasshoff in 1986.
