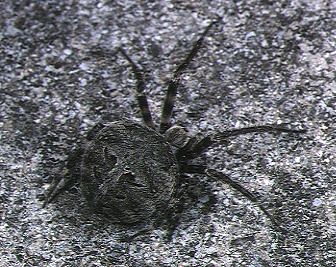

Scientific classification
- Domain: Eukaryota
- Kingdom: Animalia
- Phylum: Arthropoda
- Subphylum: Chelicerata
- Class: Arachnida
- Order: Araneae
- Infraorder: Araneomorphae
- Family: Araneidae
- Genus: Neoscona
- Species: N. nautica

Binomial name
- Neoscona nautica (L. Koch, 1875)

= Neoscona nautica =

Species of spider

Neoscona nautica, the brown sailor spider, is a species of orb weaver in the family Araneidae. Found in Asia and the Pacific islands, it has been introduced into both Americas, and the Sudan.
