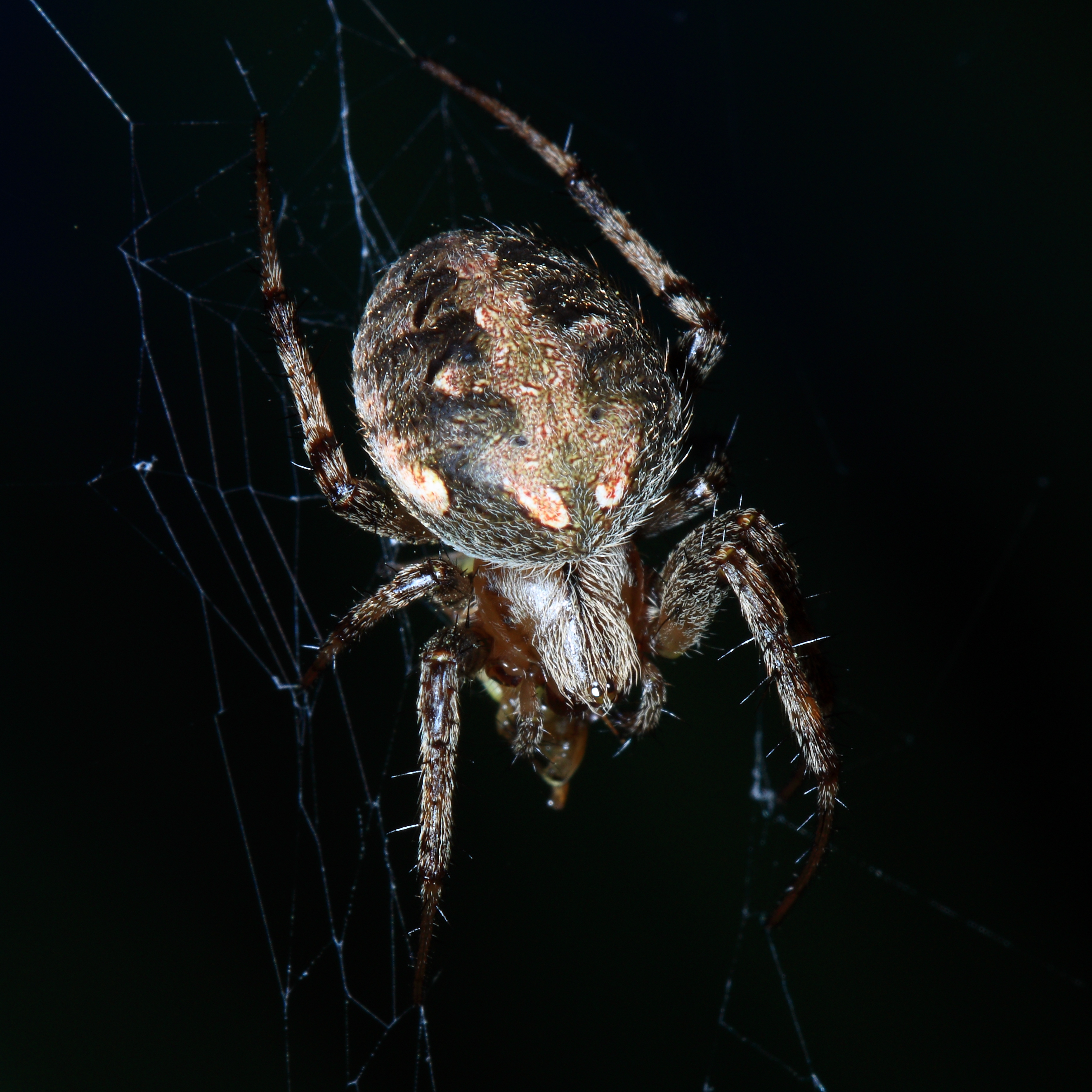
- Female
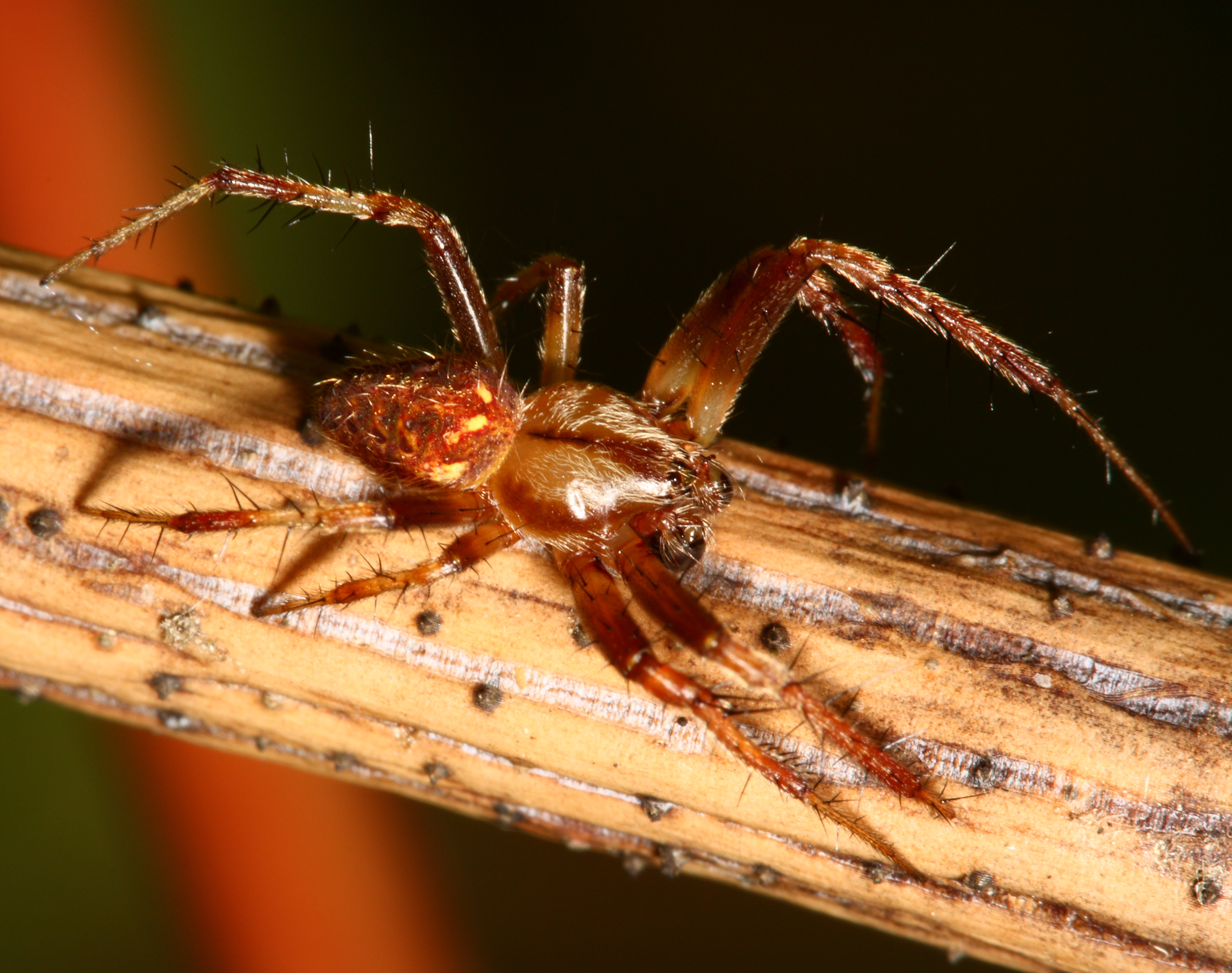
- Male size = 8mm

Scientific classification
- Kingdom: Animalia
- Phylum: Arthropoda
- Subphylum: Chelicerata
- Class: Arachnida
- Order: Araneae
- Infraorder: Araneomorphae
- Family: Araneidae
- Genus: Neoscona
- Species: N. arabesca

Binomial name
- Neoscona arabesca (Walckenaer, 1841)

= Neoscona arabesca =

Species of spider

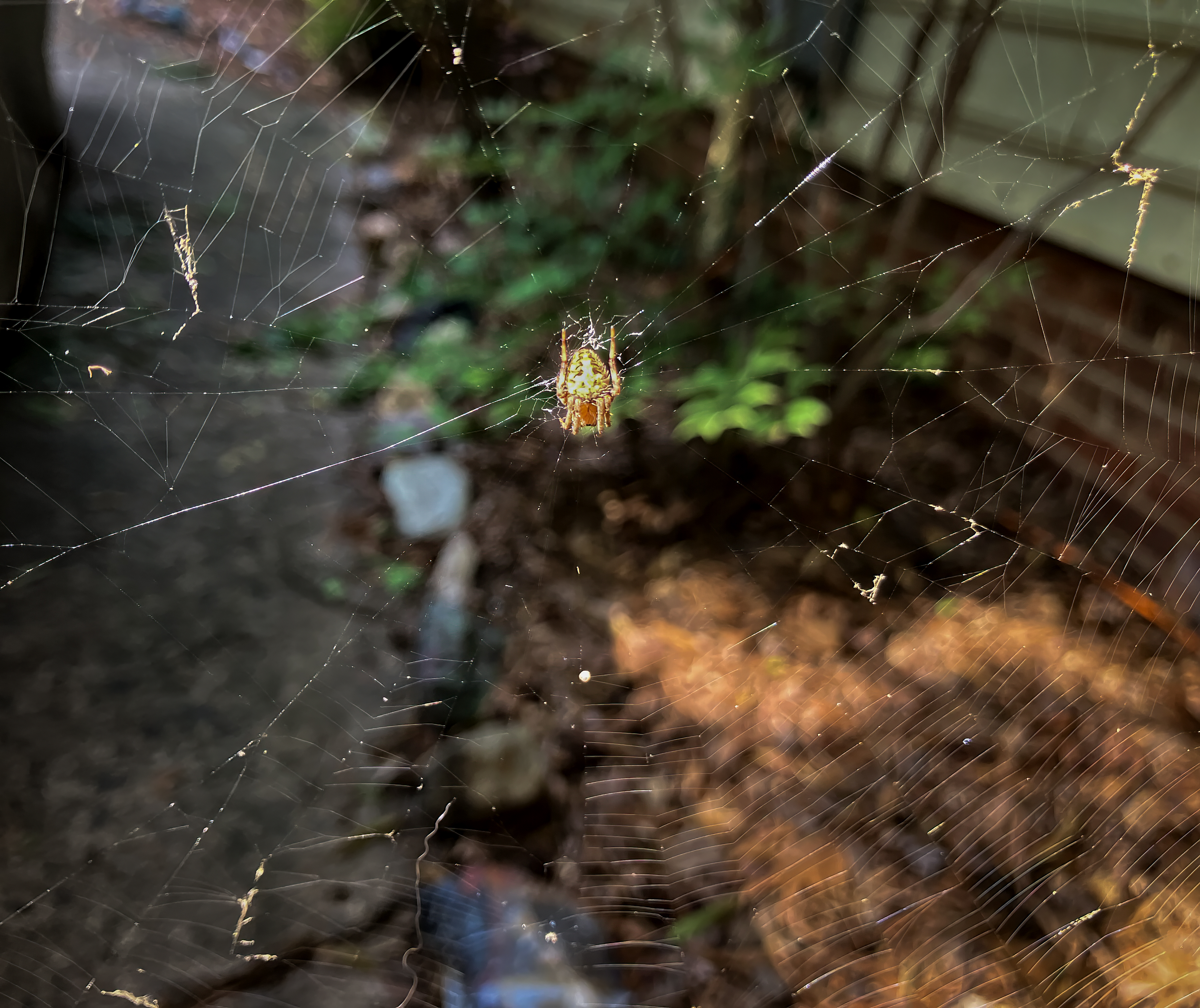
An arabesque orbweaver in its web

Neoscona arabesca is a common orb-weaver spider found throughout North America. Often called the arabesque orbweaver, after the cryptic, brightly colored, swirling markings on its prominent abdomen, this spider can be found in fields, forests, gardens, and on human structures. Neoscona species are among the most common and abundant orb weavers and are found on all continents. Females range in size from 5–7 mm (0.20–0.28 in) and males 5–6 mm (0.20–0.24 in).

Females build a vertical web measuring 15–45 cm (5.9–17.7 in) in diameter, with 18-20 radii. The hub is open and crossed by only one or two threads. At night, the female rests in the center of the orb with the tip of her abdomen pushed through the open space. During the daytime, she hides in a retreat away from the web, usually inside a curled-and-tied leaf. Male N. arabesca can often be found in nearby foliage or hunting on the ground.

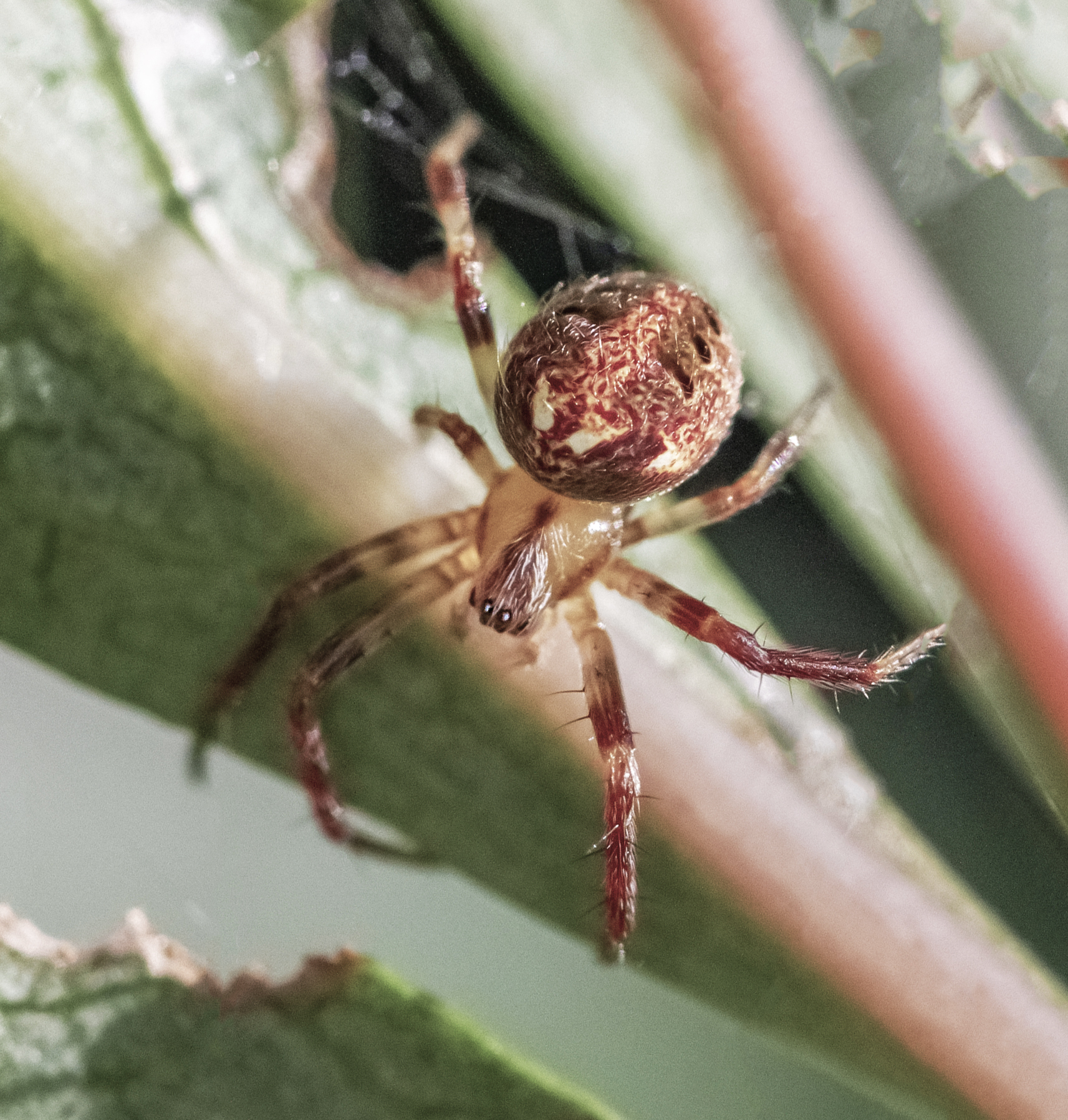
Arabesque orbweaver (Neoscona arabesca)

Arabesque orb-weavers are, like any other orb-weaver, non-aggressive spiders. Only in rare cases, where the spider feels threatened, bites to humans or pets occur. The bite of an arabesque orb-weaver is not medically significant and the pain is mostly short-lived and comparable to a bee sting.
