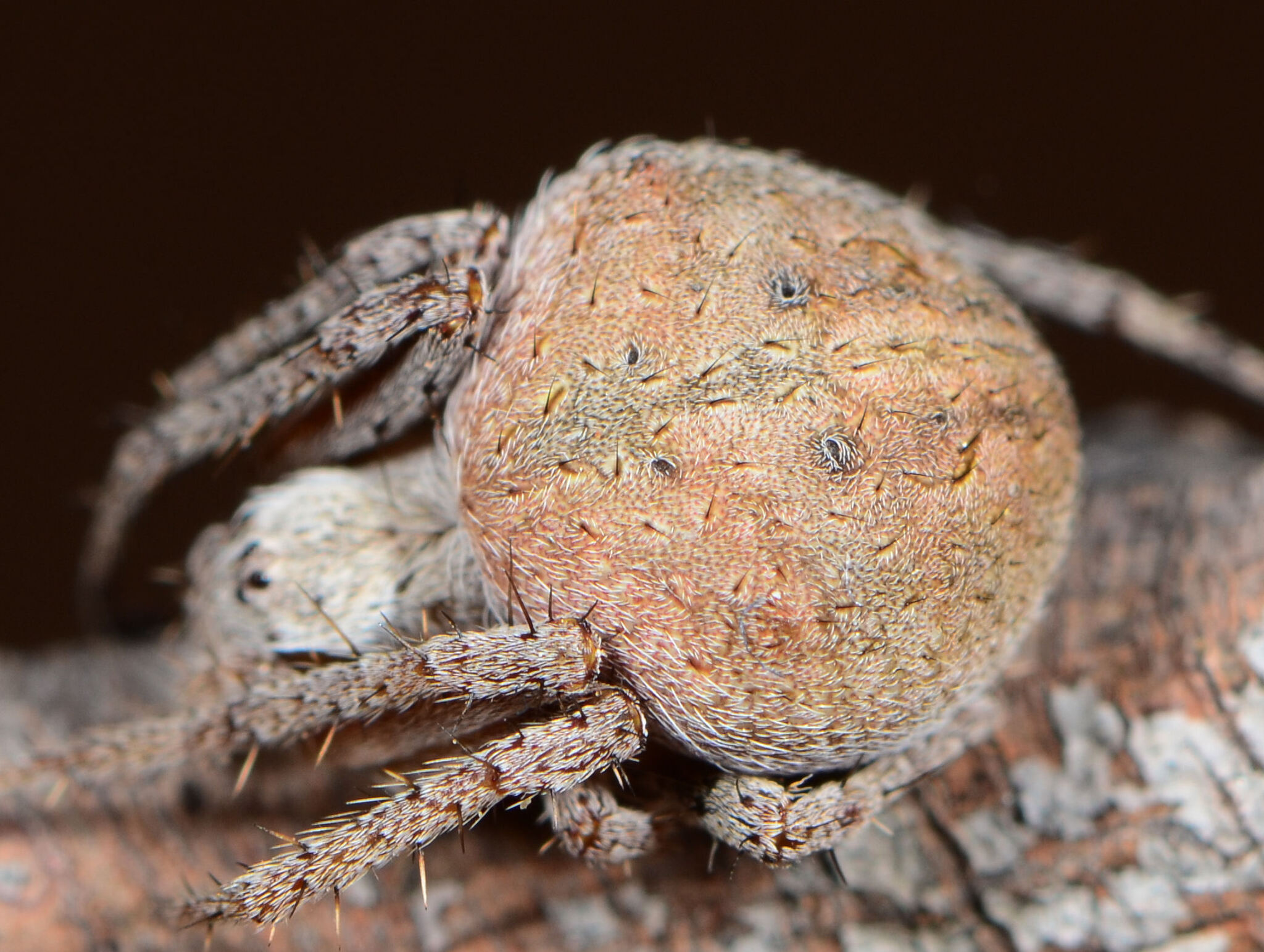
- Female
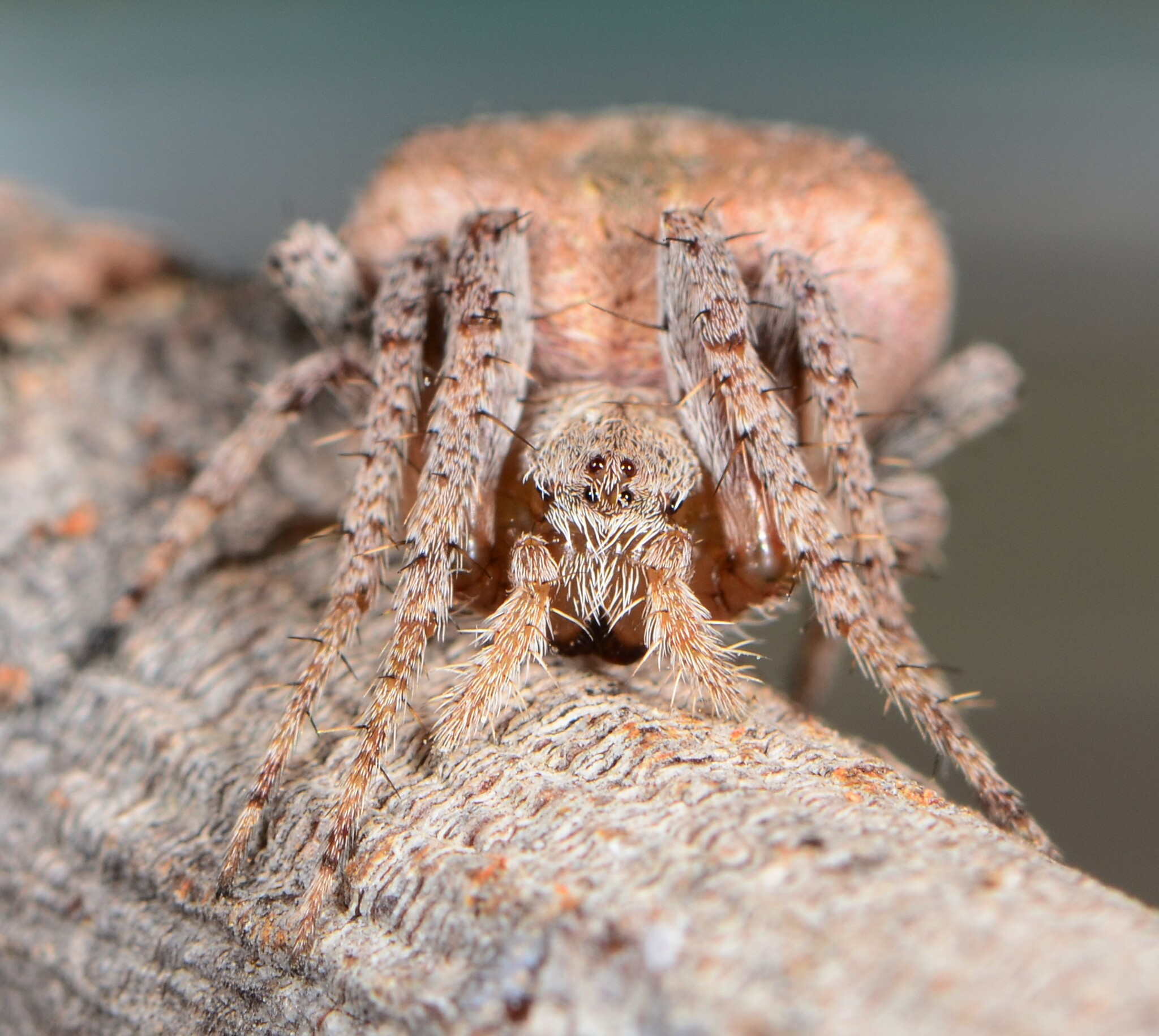
- Female

Scientific classification
- Kingdom: Animalia
- Phylum: Arthropoda
- Subphylum: Chelicerata
- Class: Arachnida
- Order: Araneae
- Infraorder: Araneomorphae
- Family: Araneidae
- Genus: Neoscona
- Species: N. hirta

Binomial name
- Neoscona hirta (C. L. Koch, 1844)

Synonyms
- Araneus mensamontis Pocock, 1900

= Neoscona hirta =

Large Neoscona Orb-Web Spider

Species of spider

Neoscona hirta is a species of spider in the family Araneidae. It is commonly known as the large Neoscona orb-web spider and is an endemic species to Africa.

== Etymology ==
The species name hirta means "hairy" in Latin.

== Distribution ==
Neoscona hirta is known from seven African countries: Democratic Republic of the Congo, Botswana, Ivory Coast, Eswatini, Tanzania, Zambia, Zimbabwe, and South Africa.

In South Africa, the species is recorded from six provinces at altitudes ranging from 7 to 1,758 m above sea level. These include Eastern Cape, Gauteng, Limpopo, KwaZulu-Natal, Mpumalanga, and Western Cape.

== Habitat and ecology ==
Females make orb-webs at night in vegetation and remove the web early in the morning. The species has been sampled from the Fynbos, Grassland, Savanna, and Thicket biomes. It has also been found in vineyards and is associated with the bark of Vachellia xanthophloea trees in Ndumo Game Reserve.

== Description ==
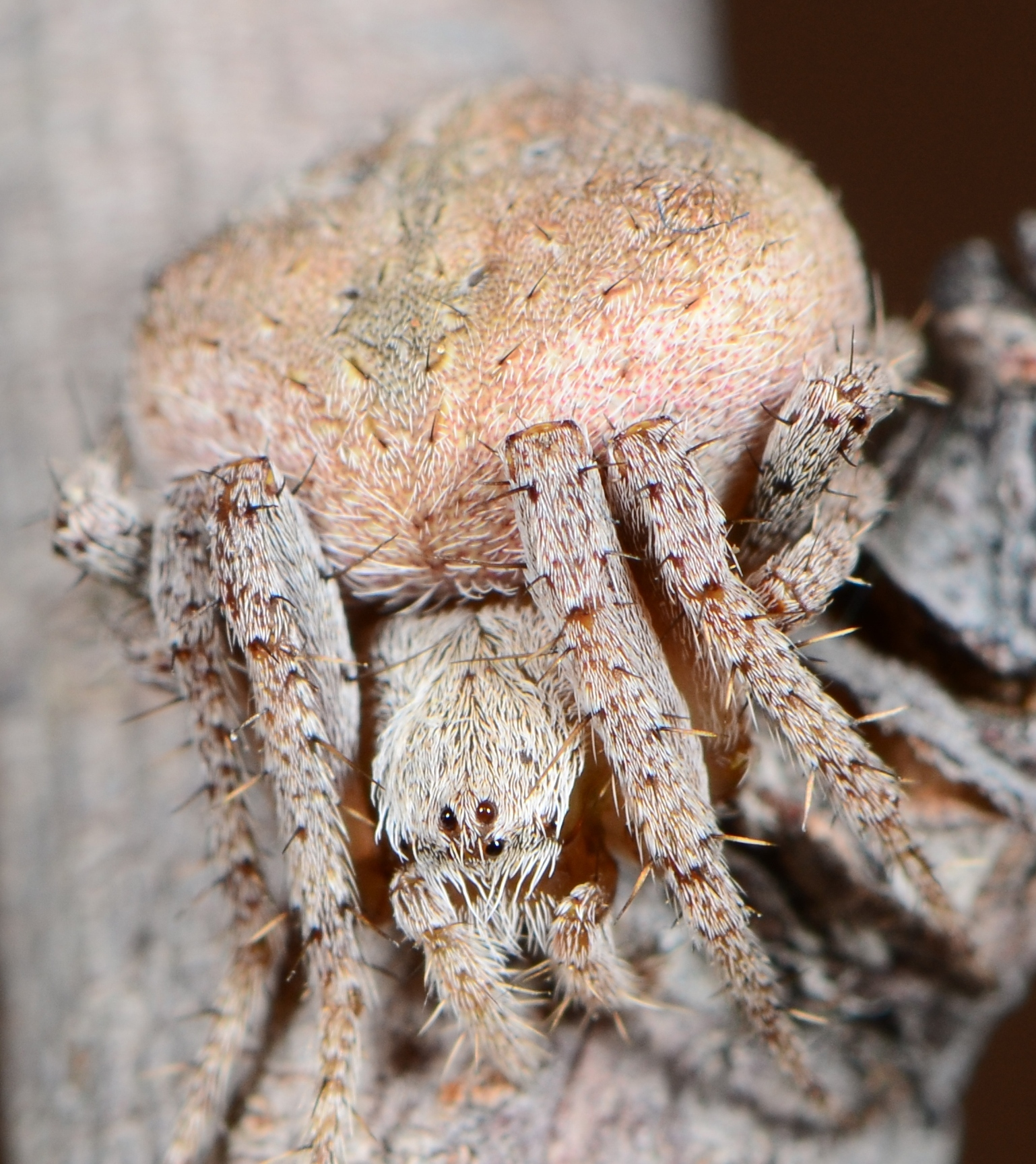
adult female

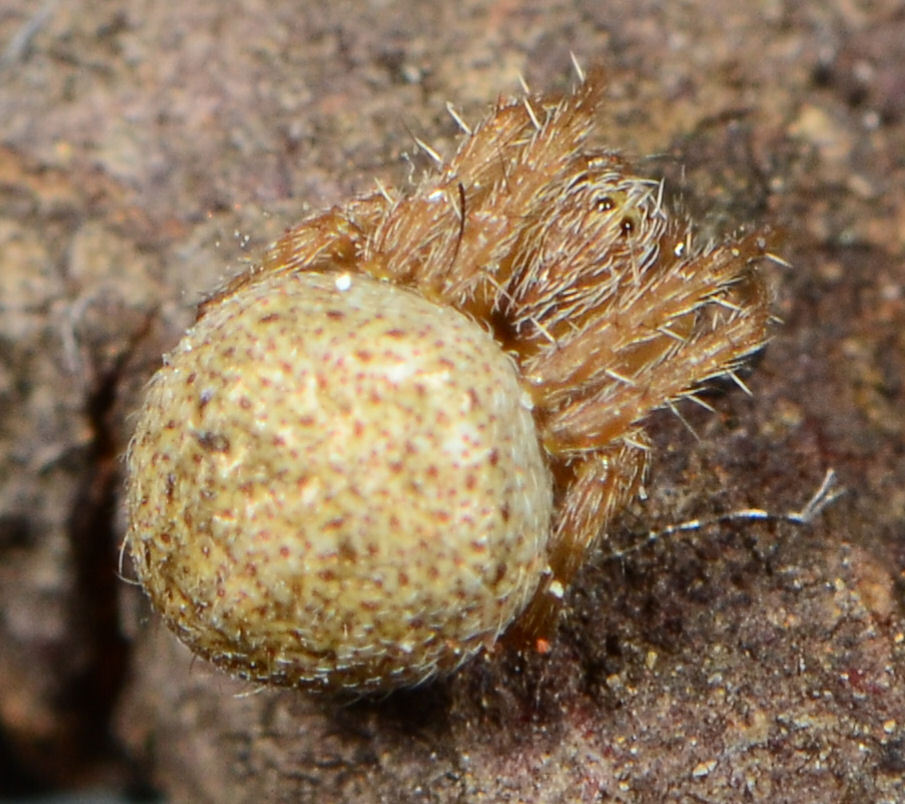
juvenile female

Neoscona hirta is known from both sexes. Females are large spiders measuring 11-17 mm in body length.

== Conservation ==
Neoscona hirta is listed as Least Concern by the South African National Biodiversity Institute due to its wide geographical range. There are no known threats to the species. It has been sampled from 10 protected areas.

== Taxonomy ==
The species was originally described by C. L. Koch in 1844 as Epeira hirta with the type locality listed only as "Süd Africa". It was revised by Grasshoff in 1986, who synonymized Araneus mensamontis with this species.
