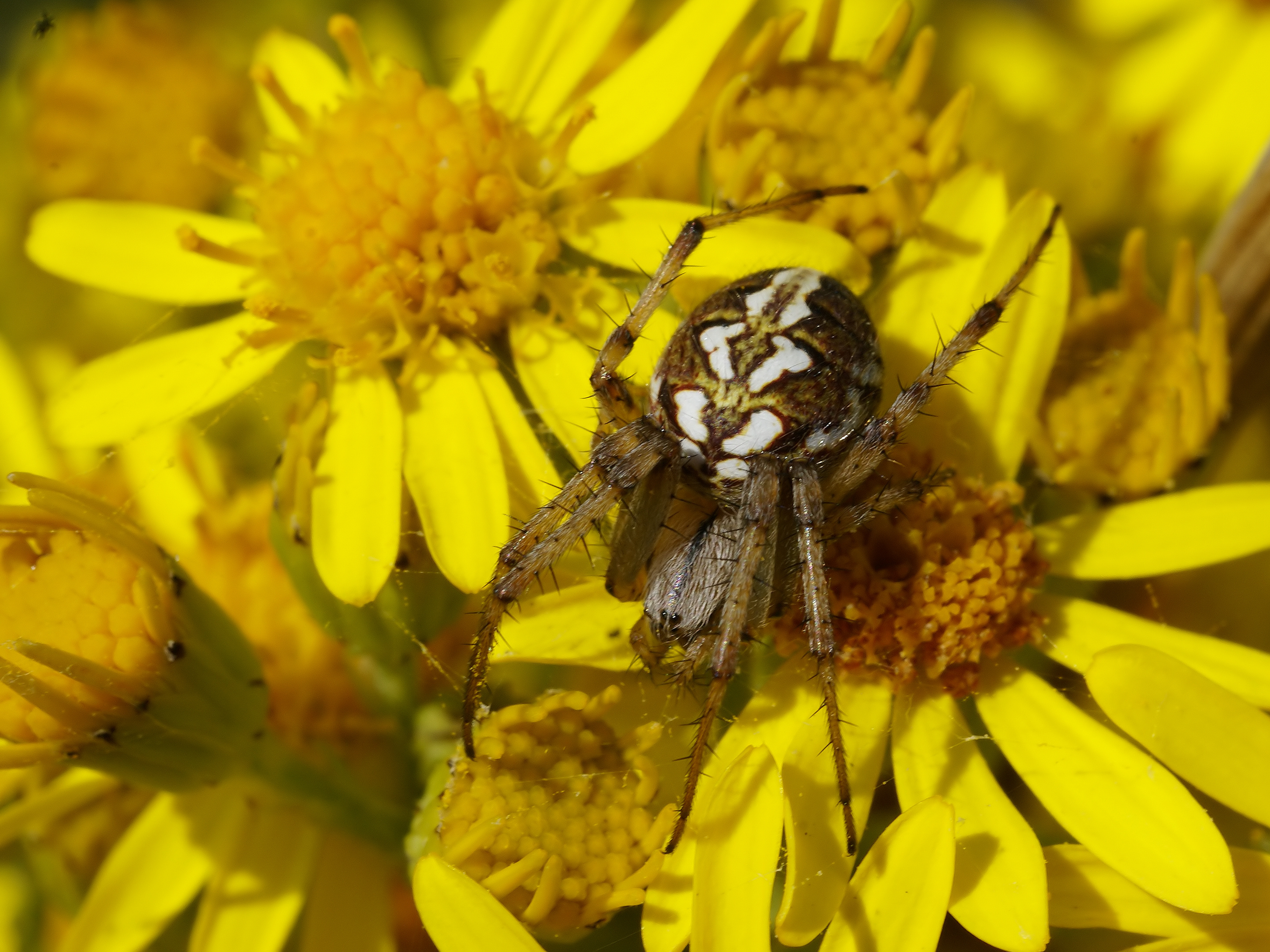
- Neoscona adianta in Belgium

Scientific classification
- Kingdom: Animalia
- Phylum: Arthropoda
- Subphylum: Chelicerata
- Class: Arachnida
- Order: Araneae
- Infraorder: Araneomorphae
- Family: Araneidae
- Genus: Neoscona; E. Simon, 1864

Type species
- N. arabesca (Walckenaer, 1841)

Species
- 123, see text

= Neoscona =

Genus of spiders

Neoscona, known as spotted orb-weavers and barn spiders, is a genus of orb-weaver spiders (Araneidae) with more than 100 described species. It was erected by Eugène Simon in 1895 to separate these from other araneids in the now obsolete genus Epeira.

== Name ==
The name Neoscona was derived from the Greek νέω, meaning "spin", and σχοῖνος, meaning "reed".

== Distribution ==
They have a mostly pantropical distribution and one species, Neoscona adianta, has a palearctic distribution.

Only eight of the more than 100 species can be found in North America.

== Description ==
Neoscona species are among the most common spiders in North America and are found throughout most parts of the world.

There are large variations in the dorsal patterns and coloration of the abdomen, even in a single species. Most have a light color with wavy edges along the mid-line, and darker swirls either side of that. Ventral abdominal patterns may consist of a dark area bordered by white, roughly forming a square. In adults the pattern can be faded. The center of the abdomen is dark bordered on the sides by white spots.

Neoscona can be difficult to distinguish from species of Araneus without close examination of the carapace. Neoscona have a characteristic dorsal groove on the carapace that is parallel with the long axis of the body. The dorsal grooves of Araneus are transverse or angular, though they are sometimes so small that they appear as dimples on the dorsal surface.

The leg formula of Neoscona is 1243: the first are the longest, the second are second longest and the third are the shortest. The largest eyes are the anterior medians, next or subequal are posterior medians and the secondary eyes are slightly smaller.

The webs are usually vertical with about twenty radii and an open hub at the centre. Some species have been recorded as retreating to a leaf during the day.

== Diversity ==
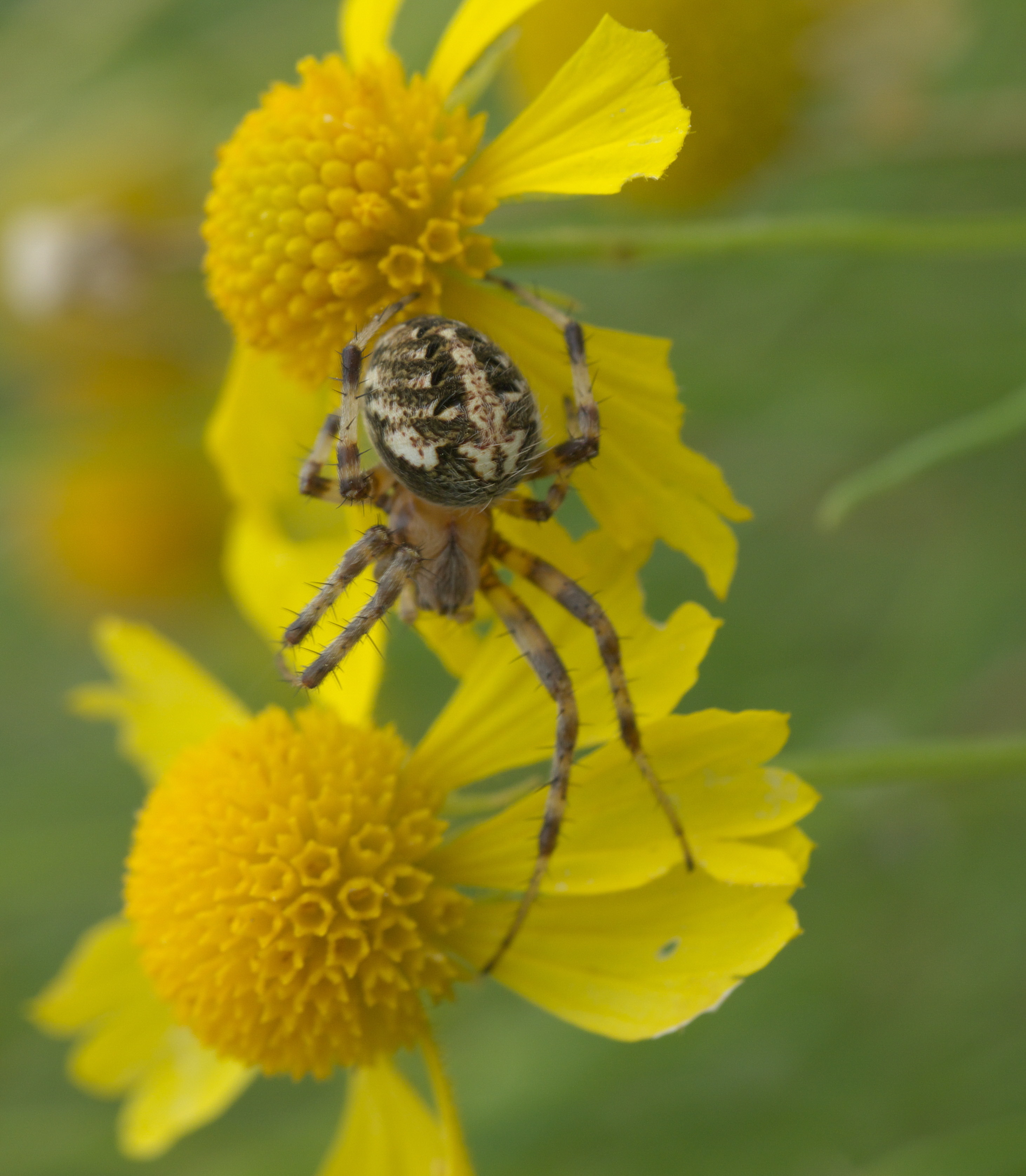
Neoscona arabesca Oklahoma, USA

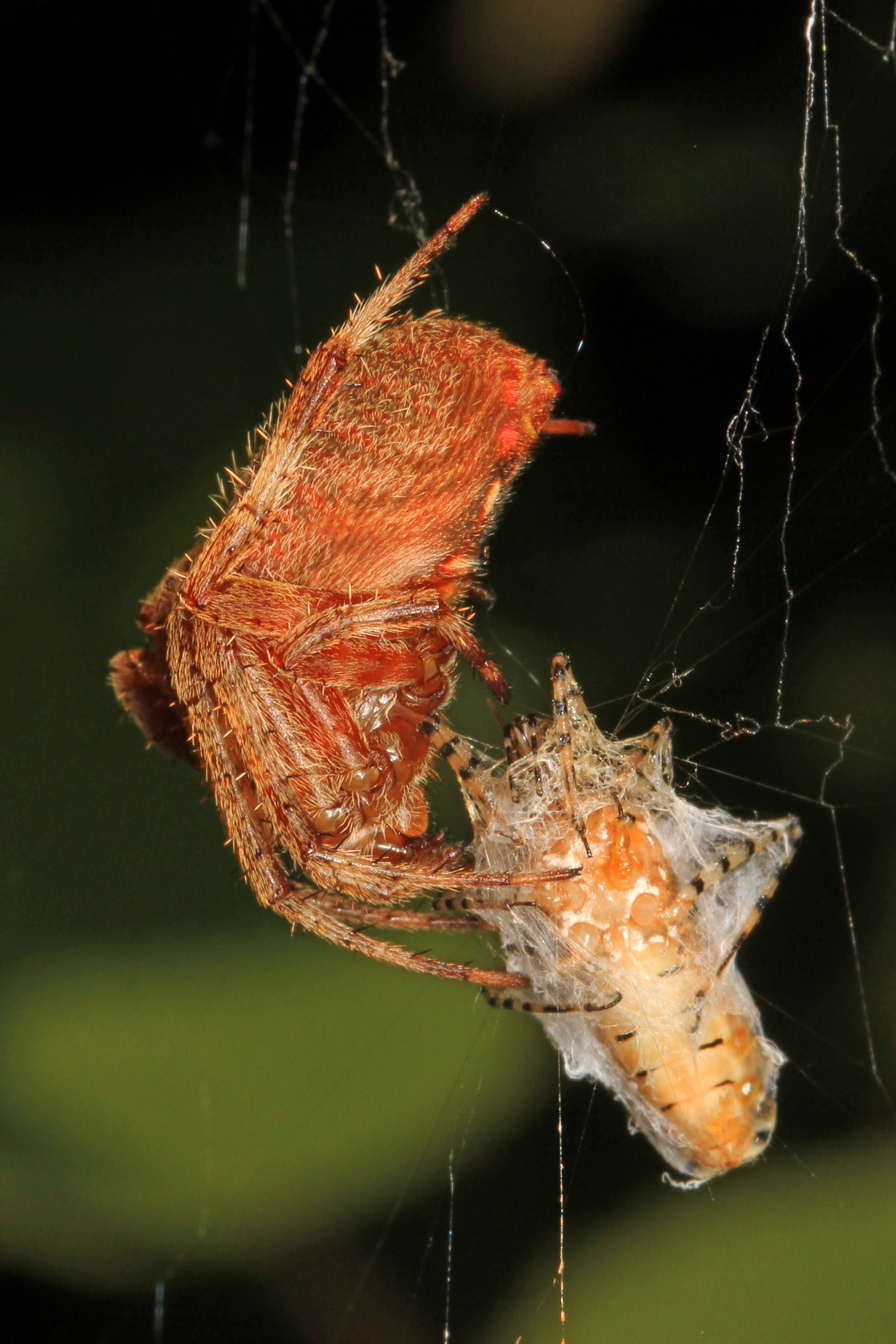
Neoscona crucifera with prey Virginia, USA

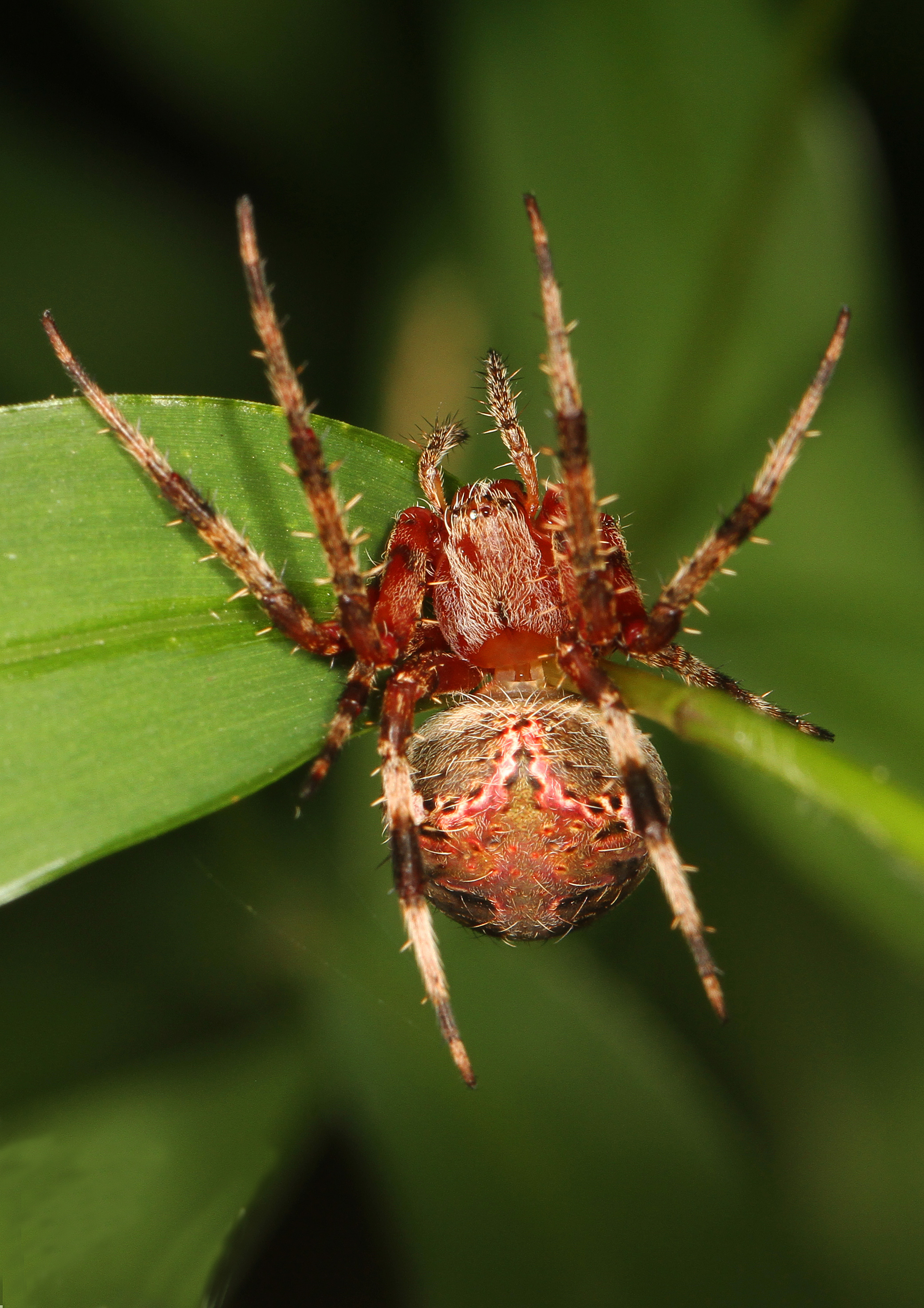
Neoscona domiciliorum Virginia, USA

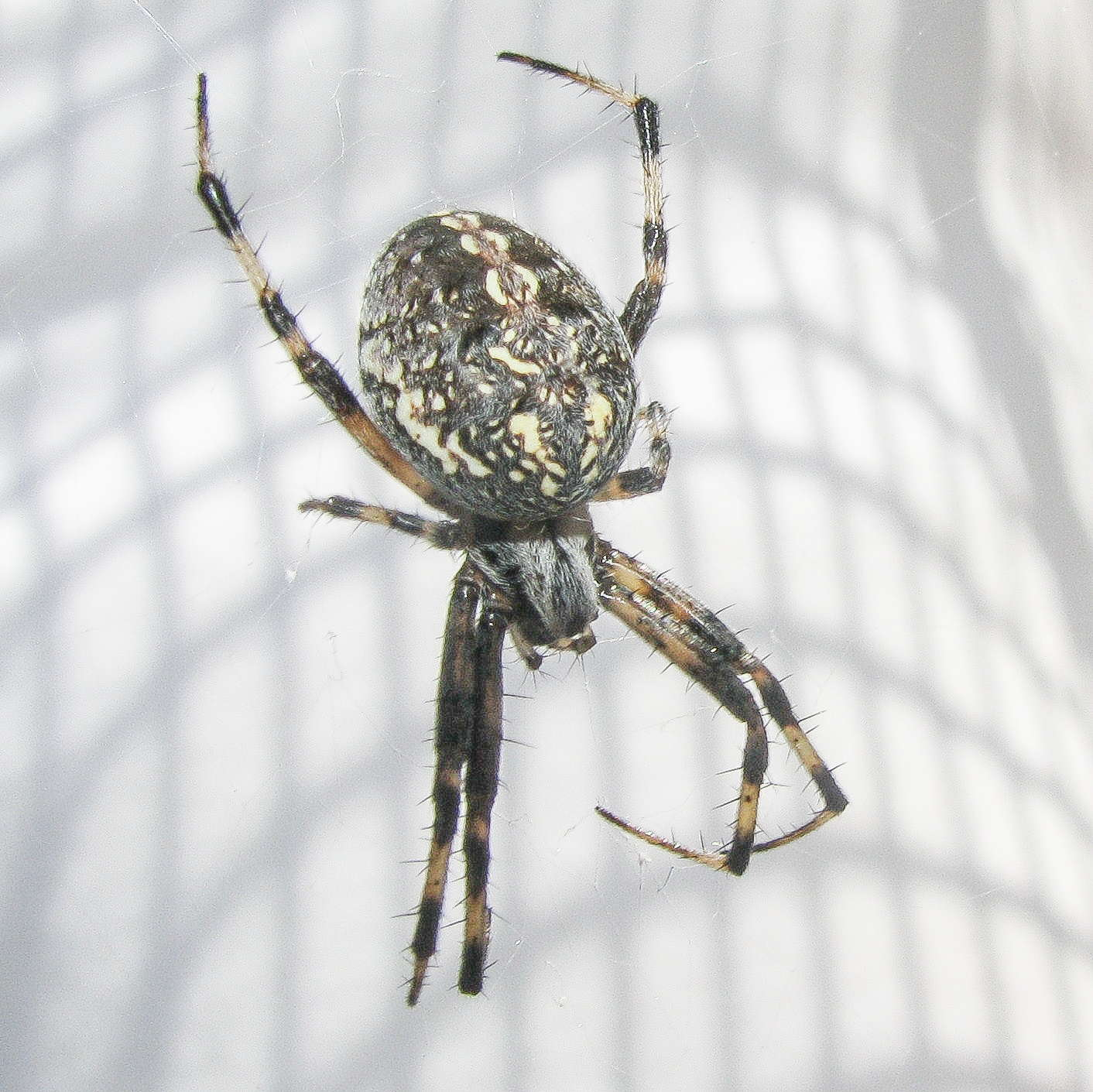
Neoscona oaxacensis California, USA

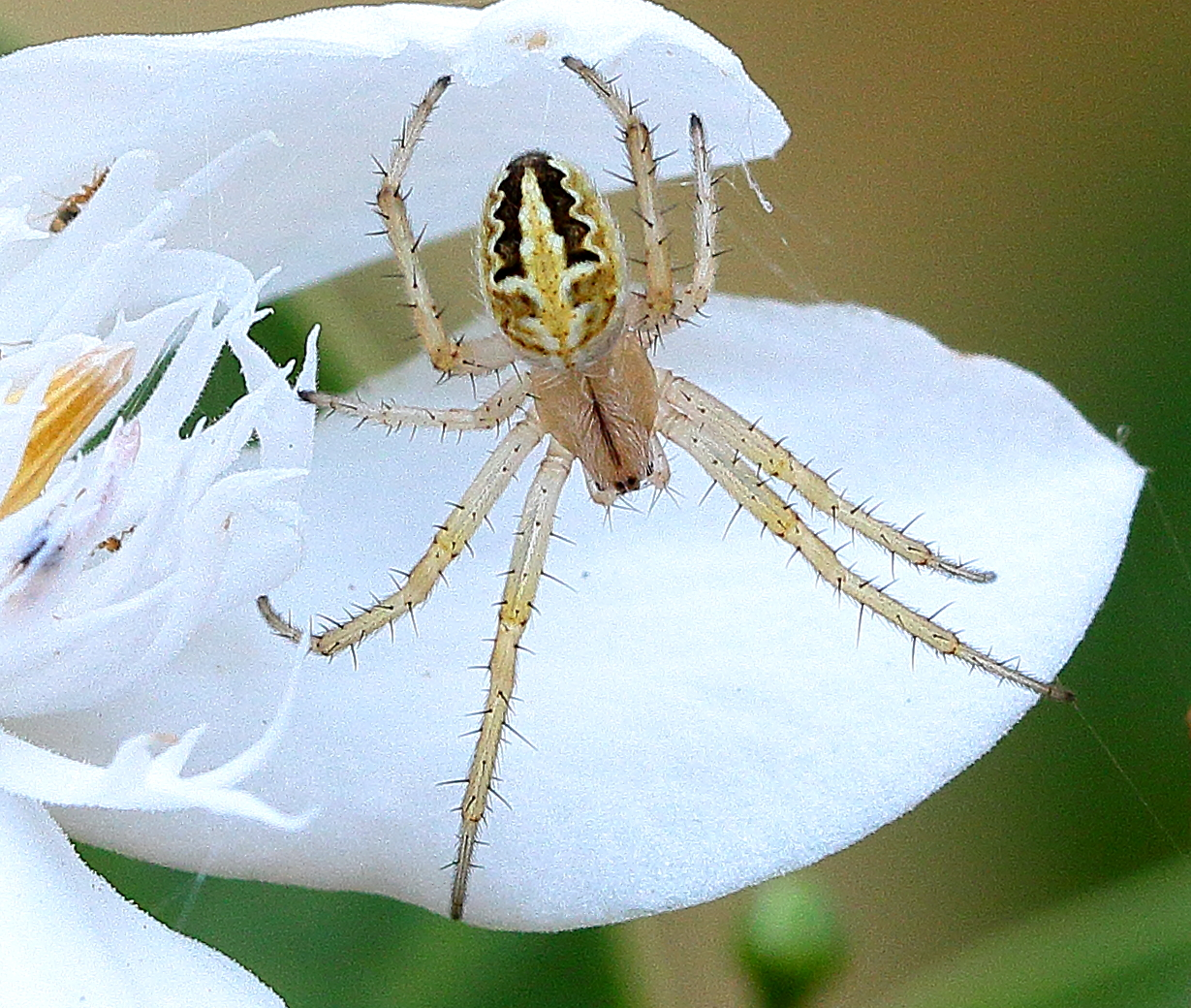
Neoscona theisi Queensland, Australia

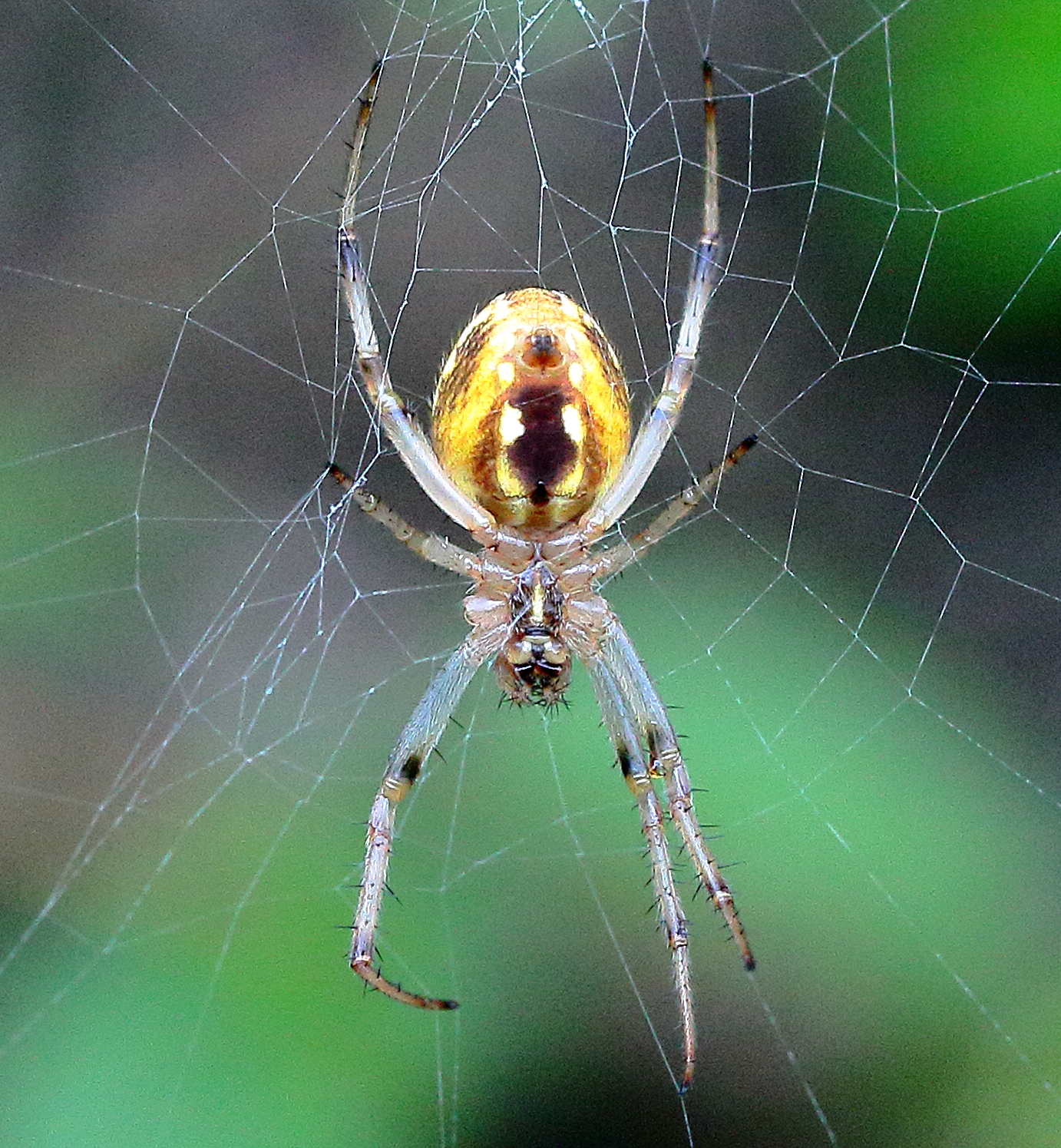
Neoscona theisi female ventral, Queensland, Australia

== Species ==
As of November 2026, this genus includes 112 species and eleven subspecies:

- Neoscona achine (Simon, 1906) – India, China
- Neoscona adianta (Walckenaer, 1802) – Europe, North Africa, Central Asia, Russia (Europe to Far East), China, Korea, Japan
  - Neoscona adianta persecta (Schenkel, 1936) – China
- Neoscona alberti (Strand, 1913) – DR Congo, Rwanda, Kenya, Zimbabwe, South Africa
- Neoscona albertoi Barrion-Dupo, 2008 – Philippines
- Neoscona aldinei Barrion-Dupo, 2008 – Philippines
- Neoscona amamiensis Tanikawa, 1998 – Japan
- Neoscona ampoyae Barrion-Dupo, 2008 – Philippines
- Neoscona angulatula (Schenkel, 1937) – Kenya, South Africa, Madagascar, Aldabra, Assumption Island
- Neoscona arabesca (Walckenaer, 1841) – North, Central America, Caribbean. Introduced to Nepal, China (type species)
- Neoscona bengalensis Tikader & Bal, 1981 – Pakistan, India, Bangladesh
- Neoscona bihumpi Patel, 1988 – India
- Neoscona biswasi Bhandari & Gajbe, 2001 – India
- Neoscona blondeli (Simon, 1886) – Africa
- Neoscona bucheti (Lessert, 1930) – Democratic Republic of the Congo
  - Neoscona bucheti avakubiensis (Lessert, 1930) – Congo
  - Neoscona bucheti flexuosa (Lessert, 1930) – Congo, Yemen
- Neoscona byzanthina (Pavesi, 1876) – Spain, France, Italy, Romania, Balkans, Greece, Turkey, Russia (Caucasus), Iran
- Neoscona cereolella (Strand, 1907) – Congo, East Africa, Madagascar
  - Neoscona cereolella setaceola (Strand, 1913) – Central Africa
- Neoscona cheesmanae (Berland, 1938) – Vanuatu
- Neoscona chiarinii (Pavesi, 1883) – Cameroon, DR Congo, Uganda, Rwanda, Burundi, Tanzania, Zimbabwe, South Africa
- Neoscona chongzuoensis X. X. Zhang & F. Zhang, 2011 – China
- Neoscona chrysanthusi Tikader & Bal, 1981 – Pakistan, India, Bhutan
- Neoscona crucifera (Lucas, 1838) – North America. Introduced to Hawaii, Azores, Madeira, Canary Islands
- Neoscona decolor (L. Koch, 1871) – Australia (New South Wales, Victoria), Fiji
- Neoscona dhruvai Patel & Nigam, 1994 – India
- Neoscona dhumani Patel & Reddy, 1993 – India
- Neoscona domiciliorum (Hentz, 1847) – United States
- Neoscona dostinikea Barrion & Litsinger, 1995 – Philippines
- Neoscona dyali Gajbe, 2004 – India
- Neoscona elliptica Tikader & Bal, 1981 – India, Bangladesh, China, Thailand, Laos
- Neoscona enucleata (Karsch, 1879) – India, Sri Lanka, Myanmar, Sumatra
- Neoscona facundoi Barrion-Dupo, 2008 – Philippines
- Neoscona flavida Kim, Lee & Yoo, 2019 – Korea
- Neoscona flavopunctata (L. Koch, 1871) – Fiji
- Neoscona floriata (Hogg, 1914) – Indonesia (New Guinea)
- Neoscona fuscinotum (Strand, 1908) – Togo
- Neoscona goliath (Benoit, 1963) – Ivory Coast
- Neoscona govindai Biswas & Raychaudhuri, 2013 – Bangladesh
- Neoscona granti (Hogg, 1914) – New Guinea
- Neoscona hirta (C. L. Koch, 1844) – Ivory Coast, DR Congo, Tanzania, Zambia, Botswana, Zimbabwe, South Africa, Eswatini
- Neoscona holmi (Schenkel, 1953) – China, Korea
- Neoscona huzaifi Mukhtar, 2012 – Pakistan
- Neoscona inusta (L. Koch, 1871) – Taiwan, China, Philippines, Indonesia, (Sumatra)
- Neoscona isatis Zamani, Marusik & Šestáková, 2020 – Iran
- Neoscona jindoensis Kim, Lee & Ji, 2016 – Korea
- Neoscona jinghongensis Yin, Wang, Xie & Peng, 1990 – China
- Neoscona kabiri Biswas & Raychaudhuri, 2013 – Bangladesh
- Neoscona kisangani Grasshoff, 1986 – Congo
- Neoscona kivuensis Grasshoff, 1986 – DR Congo, South Africa
- Neoscona kunmingensis Yin, Wang, Xie & Peng, 1990 – China
- Neoscona lactea (Saito, 1933) – Taiwan
- Neoscona leucaspis (Schenkel, 1963) – China
- Neoscona lipana Barrion-Dupo, 2008 – Philippines
- Neoscona maculaticeps (L. Koch, 1871) – Japan, Samoa
- Neoscona madagascarica (Strand, 1908) – Madagascar
- Neoscona marcanoi Levi, 1993 – Cuba, Hispaniola
- Neoscona mellotteei (Simon, 1895) – China, Korea, Taiwan, Japan
- Neoscona menghaiensis Yin, Wang, Xie & Peng, 1990 – China
- Neoscona molemensis Tikader & Bal, 1981 – India, Bangladesh, Philippines, Indonesia
- Neoscona moreli (Vinson, 1863) – Africa, Madagascar, Seychelles, Réunion, Mauritius. Introduced to the Caribbean, Colombia, Venezuela, Argentina
- Neoscona mukerjei Tikader, 1980 – Pakistan, India, Bangladesh
- Neoscona multiplicans (Chamberlin, 1924) – China, Korea, Japan
- Neoscona murthyi Patel & Reddy, 1990 – India
- Neoscona nasidae Biswas & Raychaudhuri, 2013 – Bangladesh
- Neoscona nautica (L. Koch, 1875) – Asia and Pacific islands. Introduced to the Americas and Africa
- Neoscona notanda (Rainbow, 1912) – Australia (Queensland)
- Neoscona novella (Simon, 1907) – Equatorial Guinea (Bioko), South Africa
- Neoscona oaxacensis (Keyserling, 1864) – United States, Peru, Galapagos
- Neoscona odites (Simon, 1906) – India
- Neoscona oriemindoroana Barrion & Litsinger, 1995 – Philippines
- Neoscona orizabensis F. O. Pickard-Cambridge, 1904 – Mexico
- Neoscona panchganiensis (Tikader & Bal, 1981) – India
- Neoscona parambikulamensis Patel, 2003 – India
- Neoscona pavida (Simon, 1906) – Pakistan, India, China
- Neoscona penicillipes (Karsch, 1879) – West, Central Africa, South Africa
- Neoscona piaoyi Mi, Wang & Li, 2024 – China
- Neoscona platnicki Gajbe & Gajbe, 2001 – India
- Neoscona plebeja (L. Koch, 1871) – Fiji, Tonga, Tuvalu (Funafuti), Austral Is. (Rapa)
- Neoscona pratensis (Hentz, 1847) – Canada, United States
- Neoscona pseudonautica Yin, Wang, Xie & Peng, 1990 – China, Korea
- Neoscona pseudoscylla (Schenkel, 1953) – China
- Neoscona punctigera (Doleschall, 1857) – Réunion, India, Myanmar, China, Korea, Japan, Indonesia, Philippines, New Guinea, Australia
- Neoscona quadrigibbosa Grasshoff, 1986 – Central Africa, Kenya, Namibia, South Africa, Eswatini
- Neoscona quincasea Roberts, 1983 – Cabo Verde, DR Congo, Rwanda, Kenya, Malawi, Namibia, South Africa, Seychelles (Aldabra, Assumption)
- Neoscona rahamani Biswas & Raychaudhuri, 2013 – Bangladesh
- Neoscona rapta (Thorell, 1899) – Sub-Saharan Africa. Introduced to St. Helena
- Neoscona raydakensis Saha, Biswas, Majumder & Raychaudhuri, 1995 – India
- Neoscona rufipalpis (Lucas, 1858) – Cape Verde, St. Helena, Africa, Yemen
  - Neoscona rufipalpis buettnerana (Strand, 1908) – Cameroon, Togo
- Neoscona sanghi Gajbe, 2004 – India
- Neoscona sanjivani Gajbe, 2004 – India
- Neoscona scylla (Karsch, 1879) – Pakistan, Nepal, China, Russia (Far East), Korea, Japan
- Neoscona scylloides (Bösenberg & Strand, 1906) – Russia (Far East), Korea, Japan, China, Taiwan
- Neoscona semilunaris (Karsch, 1879) – China, Korea, Japan
- Neoscona shillongensis Tikader & Bal, 1981 – Pakistan, India, China
- Neoscona simoni Grasshoff, 1986 – Central Africa
- Neoscona sinhagadensis (Tikader, 1975) – India, Pakistan, China
- Neoscona spasskyi (Brignoli, 1983) – Caucasus (Russia, Georgia, Armenia), Iran, Kazakhstan, Turkmenistan, Tajikistan, Kyrgyzstan
- Neoscona stanleyi (Lessert, 1930) – Congo
- Neoscona strigatella (Strand, 1908) – East Africa
- Neoscona subfusca (C. L. Koch, 1837) – Southern Europe, St. Helena, Africa, Turkey, Middle East, Ukraine, Caucasus, European Russia to Central Asia
  - Neoscona subfusca alboplagiata Caporiacco, 1947 – Tanzania
  - Neoscona subfusca pallidior (Thorell, 1899) – Equatorial Guinea (Bioko)
- Neoscona subpullata (Bösenberg & Strand, 1906) – China, Korea, Japan
- Neoscona tedgenica (Bakhvalov, 1978) – Turkmenistan
- Neoscona theisi (Walckenaer, 1841) – Cyprus, Israel, Caucasus (Georgia, Russia), Iraq, Iran, Pakistan, India, Nepal, Philippines, China, Indonesia, Japan, Australia. Introduced to Seychelles, Pacific Is.
  - Neoscona theisi carbonaria (Simon, 1909) – Vietnam
  - Neoscona theisi savesi (Simon, 1880) – New Caledonia
  - Neoscona theisi theisiella (Tullgren, 1910) – West, Central, East Africa, Mozambique, South Africa, Eswatini, Yemen
  - Neoscona theisi triangulifera (Thorell, 1878) – New Guinea
- Neoscona tianmenensis Yin, Wang, Xie & Peng, 1990 – China, Korea
- Neoscona triangula (Keyserling, 1864) – Cape Verde, Africa, India
- Neoscona triramusa Yin & Zhao, 1994 – China
- Neoscona ujavalai Reddy & Patel, 1992 – India
- Neoscona usbonga Barrion & Litsinger, 1995 – India, Philippines
- Neoscona utahana (Chamberlin, 1919) – United States, Mexico
- Neoscona vigilans (Blackwall, 1865) – Sub-Saharan Africa, Oman, Iran, Pakistan, Japan and New Guinea
- Neoscona wuding Mi, Wang & Li, 2024 – China
- Neoscona xishanensis Yin, Wang, Xie & Peng, 1990 – India, China
- Neoscona yadongensis Yin, Wang, Xie & Peng, 1990 – China
- Neoscona yptinika Barrion & Litsinger, 1995 – India, Philippines
- Neoscona zhui X. X. Zhang & F. Zhang, 2011 – China
