= Neoscona menghaiensis =

Scientific classification
- Kingdom: Animalia
- Phylum: Arthropoda
- Subphylum: Chelicerata
- Class: Arachnida
- Order: Araneae
- Infraorder: Araneomorphae
- Family: Araneidae
- Genus: Neoscona
- Species: N. menghaiensis

Binomial name
- Neoscona menghaiensis Yin, Wang, Xie & Peng, 1990

Species of spider

Neoscona menghaiensis is a species of orb weaver spider in the family Araneidae. It is endemic to China.

== Distribution ==
N. menghaiensis is found in Yunnan Province, China, where it has been recorded from Menghai and Jingdong counties.

== Description ==
N. menghaiensis is a medium-sized orb weaver spider with distinct sexual dimorphism.

=== Female ===
The female has a body length of 6.00–7.70 mm, with the cephalothorax measuring 3.00 mm in length and 2.60 mm in width, and the abdomen measuring 4.90 mm in length and 4.80 mm in width. The anterior median eyes are larger than the anterior lateral eyes and slightly larger than the posterior median eyes. The eye arrangement shows the anterior row slightly procurved and the posterior row slightly recurved.

The cephalothorax is brownish with a yellowish-brown thoracic region. The head region has fine longitudinal striae and a neck groove, with three dark spots arranged in a triangle in front of the median groove. The median groove is longitudinal and reddish-brown in color. The sternum is grayish-brown with a yellowish-brown median stripe.

The abdomen is roughly triangular in shape with a grayish-brown dorsal surface interspersed with yellowish-brown coloration. The dorsal pattern includes a central leaf-shaped marking with a brownish cone-shaped spot at the front edge. The front lateral edges have four pairs of brownish crescentic spots, and the central posterior area has shallow wave-like indentations on both sides with dark brownish edges and yellowish-brown spots in between.

=== Male ===
The male is smaller, with a body length of 4.90 mm. The cephalothorax measures 2.50 mm in length and 2.10 mm in width, while the abdomen is 2.60 mm long and 2.20 mm wide. The eye arrangement differs from the female, with the anterior row strongly recurved and the anterior median eyes larger than the anterior lateral eyes.

The male's coloration is generally similar to the female but with some differences in the abdominal pattern. The median groove extends forward and is pointed, being wider than in the female and larger than the posterior edge.

== Habitat ==
The species inhabits forest environments in mountainous regions of Yunnan Province.
