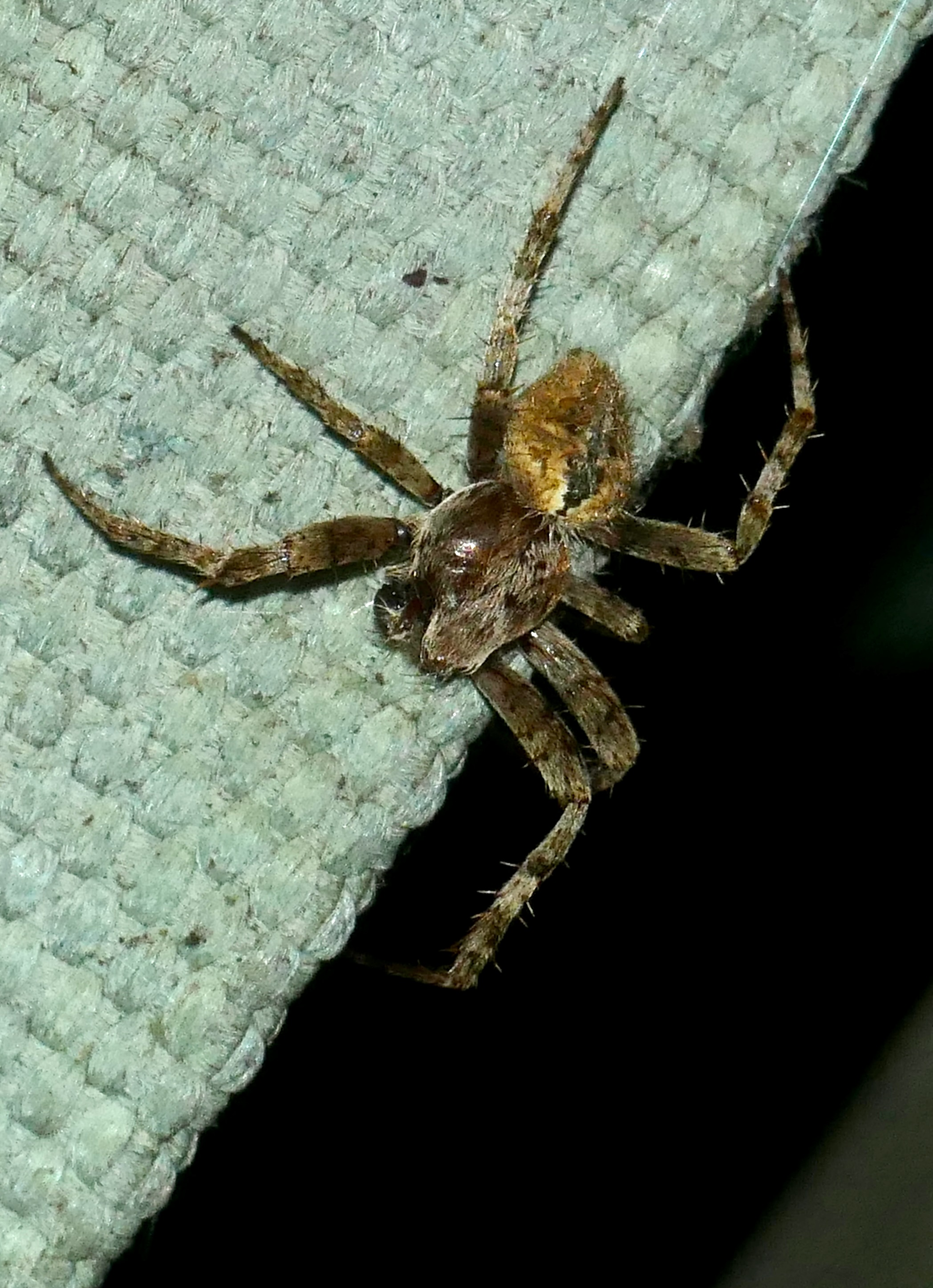

Scientific classification
- Kingdom: Animalia
- Phylum: Arthropoda
- Subphylum: Chelicerata
- Class: Arachnida
- Order: Araneae
- Infraorder: Araneomorphae
- Family: Araneidae
- Genus: Neoscona
- Species: N. rapta

Binomial name
- Neoscona rapta (Thorell, 1899)

Synonyms
- Araneus lambarenensis Simon, 1907

= Neoscona rapta =

Neoscona Orb-Web Spider

Species of spider

Neoscona rapta is a species of spider in the family Araneidae. It has a wide global distribution throughout the Afrotropical Region.

== Distribution ==
Neoscona rapta is widespread throughout Africa.

In South Africa, the species is recorded from eight provinces including nine protected areas at altitudes ranging from 4 to 1,557 m above sea level.

== Habitat and ecology ==
Neoscona rapta makes orb-webs in vegetation at night. The species has been sampled from all the floral biomes except the Desert and Succulent biomes. The species was also sampled from pistachio orchards.

== Description ==
Neoscona rapta is known from both sexes. These spiders measure 7-8 mm in body length.

== Conservation ==
Neoscona rapta is listed as Least Concern by the South African National Biodiversity Institute due to its wide geographical range. There are no significant threats to the species. The species is protected in seven protected areas including Silaka Nature Reserve, Erfenis Dam Nature Reserve, Kalkfontein Dam Nature Reserve, Kosi Bay Nature Reserve, Ngome State Forest, uMkhuze Game Reserve, and Kgaswane Nature Reserve.

== Taxonomy ==
The species was originally described by Thorell in 1899 as Aranea rapta from Cameroon. It was revised by Grasshoff in 1986, who synonymized Araneus lambarenensis with this species.
