= Neoscona theisi theisiella =

Theis' Neoscona Orb-Web Spider

Conservation status
- Least Concern (SANBI Red List)

Scientific classification
- Kingdom: Animalia
- Phylum: Arthropoda
- Subphylum: Chelicerata
- Class: Arachnida
- Order: Araneae
- Infraorder: Araneomorphae
- Family: Araneidae
- Genus: Neoscona
- Species: N. t. theisiella

Binomial name
- Neoscona theisi theisiella (Tullgren, 1910)

Subspecies of spider

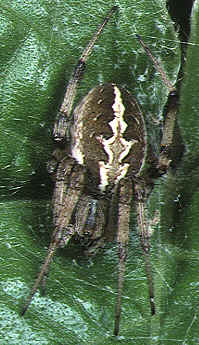
A female N. Theisi

Neoscona theisi theisiella is a subspecies of spider in the family Araneidae. It is commonly known as Theis' Neoscona orb-web spider and is an endemic species to Africa.

== Distribution ==
Neoscona theisi theisiella has a very wide distribution throughout Africa, occurring in West, Central, East Africa, Yemen, and Mozambique. The subspecies also occurs in South Africa and Eswatini.

In South Africa, the subspecies is known from seven provinces at altitudes ranging from 38 to 1,556 m above sea level.

== Habitat and ecology ==
These are medium-sized orb-web spiders that make large orb-webs in vegetation at night. They remove the web early in the morning and rest on plants. The subspecies is commonly sampled from the Thicket, Grassland, and Savanna biomes.

== Description ==
Neoscona theisi theisiella is known from both sexes. These are medium-sized spiders measuring 6.5-10.5 mm in body length.

== Conservation ==
Neoscona theisi theisiella is listed as Least Concern by the South African National Biodiversity Institute due to its wide global distribution. There are no significant threats to the subspecies. It has been sampled from seven protected areas including Ndumo Game Reserve and Addo Elephant National Park.

== Taxonomy ==
The subspecies was originally described by Tullgren in 1910 as Aranea theisiella from Tanzania. It was revised by Grasshoff in 1986.
