= Neoscona utahana =

Scientific classification
- Kingdom: Animalia
- Phylum: Arthropoda
- Subphylum: Chelicerata
- Class: Arachnida
- Order: Araneae
- Infraorder: Araneomorphae
- Family: Araneidae
- Genus: Neoscona
- Species: N. utahana

Binomial name
- Neoscona utahana (Chamberlin, 1919)

Species of spider

Neoscona utahana is a species of orb weaver in the spider family Araneidae. It is found in the United States and Mexico.
