= Neoscona kivuensis =

Kivu Neoscona Orb-Web Spider

Conservation status
- Least Concern (SANBI Red List)

Scientific classification
- Kingdom: Animalia
- Phylum: Arthropoda
- Subphylum: Chelicerata
- Class: Arachnida
- Order: Araneae
- Infraorder: Araneomorphae
- Family: Araneidae
- Genus: Neoscona
- Species: N. kivuensis

Binomial name
- Neoscona kivuensis Grasshoff, 1986

Species of spider

Neoscona kivuensis is a species of spider in the family Araneidae. It is commonly known as the Kivu Neoscona orb-web spider and is an endemic species to Africa.

== Etymology ==
The species is named after the Kivu region in the Democratic Republic of the Congo, where it was first described.

== Distribution ==
Neoscona kivuensis is known from the Democratic Republic of the Congo and South Africa.

In South Africa, the species has been recorded from three provinces: Gauteng (Irene), Northern Cape (Rooipoort Nature Reserve), and Western Cape (Karoo National Park).

== Habitat and ecology ==
The species makes orb-webs at night and removes them early in the morning. It has been sampled from the Grassland and Nama Karoo biomes.

== Description ==
Neoscona kivuensis is known from both sexes.

== Conservation ==
Neoscona kivuensis is listed as Least Concern by the South African National Biodiversity Institute due to its wide geographical range. There are no known threats to the species. The species is protected in Rooipoort Nature Reserve and Karoo National Park.

== Taxonomy ==
The species was described by Grasshoff in 1986 from the Democratic Republic of the Congo.
