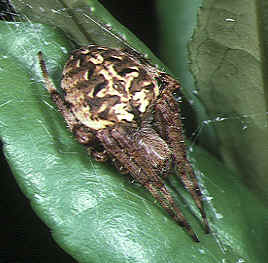
- female from Okinawa
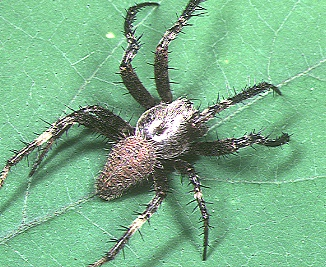
- male from Okinawa

Scientific classification
- Kingdom: Animalia
- Phylum: Arthropoda
- Subphylum: Chelicerata
- Class: Arachnida
- Order: Araneae
- Infraorder: Araneomorphae
- Family: Araneidae
- Genus: Neoscona
- Species: N. scylla

Binomial name
- Neoscona scylla (Karsch, 1879)

Synonyms
- Epeira scylla Karsch, 1879; Aranea scylla (Karsch, 1879); Chinestela gisti Chamberlin, 1924; Araneus scyllus (Karsch, 1879); Araneus scylla nigromaculatus Yaginuma, 1941; Neoscona gisti (Chamberlin, 1924)

= Neoscona scylla =

Species of orb-weaver spider

Neoscona scylla is a species of orb-weaver spider in the family Araneidae. It is found across East Asia, including Pakistan, Nepal, China, Russia (Far East), Korea, and Japan.

== Description ==
N. scylla displays considerable variation in coloration and markings, particularly in the abdominal patterns. Females can reach up to 14 mm in total length, while males are smaller at up to 10.5 mm.

=== Female ===
The female's cephalothorax is typically reddish-brown with dense whitish hairs. The sternum is dirty brown, lighter in the center. The legs are yellow with brown rings at the femora (twice ringed), and brown rings at the end of the patellae, tibiae and metatarsi. The legs are heavily armed with spines that are black at the base and transparent yellow in the upper portions.

The female's abdomen shows remarkable variability in coloration, ranging from yellowish-brown to yellowish-white with a broad, light longitudinal band down the middle. Some specimens have yellowish-brown ground color with dark brown markings, often featuring small, oblique dark cross-spots along the back. Others display darker brown sides with a broad, yellow-white central stripe. The ventral side has a distinctive broad, dark velvety-brown central field that extends to the spinnerets, with a pair of large, round white spots in the posterior half.

=== Male ===
Males have the same general body form as females but are notably smaller and somewhat lighter in coloration, particularly on the cephalothorax and extremities, while retaining similar markings and hair patterns. The abdominal coloration and pattern variation in males matches that of females. Adult males possess distinctive modifications including more heavily spined tibiae on the second pair of legs, and specialized structures on the first coxae. The male palps are highly modified for mating and differ significantly in structure from the closely related N. scylloides.

== Distribution ==
N. scylla has been recorded from Pakistan, Nepal, China, Russia (Far East), Korea, and Japan. The species appears to be widespread across temperate East Asia.

== Taxonomy ==
The species was originally described as Epeira scylla by Ferdinand Karsch in 1879. It was subsequently transferred to various genera including Aranea and Araneus before being placed in its current genus Neoscona by Yaginuma in 1955.

Several former synonyms have been placed under this species, including Chinestela gisti Chamberlin, 1924, and Araneus scylla nigromaculatus Yaginuma, 1941. The species Neoscona gisti was synonymized with N. scylla by Song in 1988, though this synonymy has been subject to some taxonomic debate.
