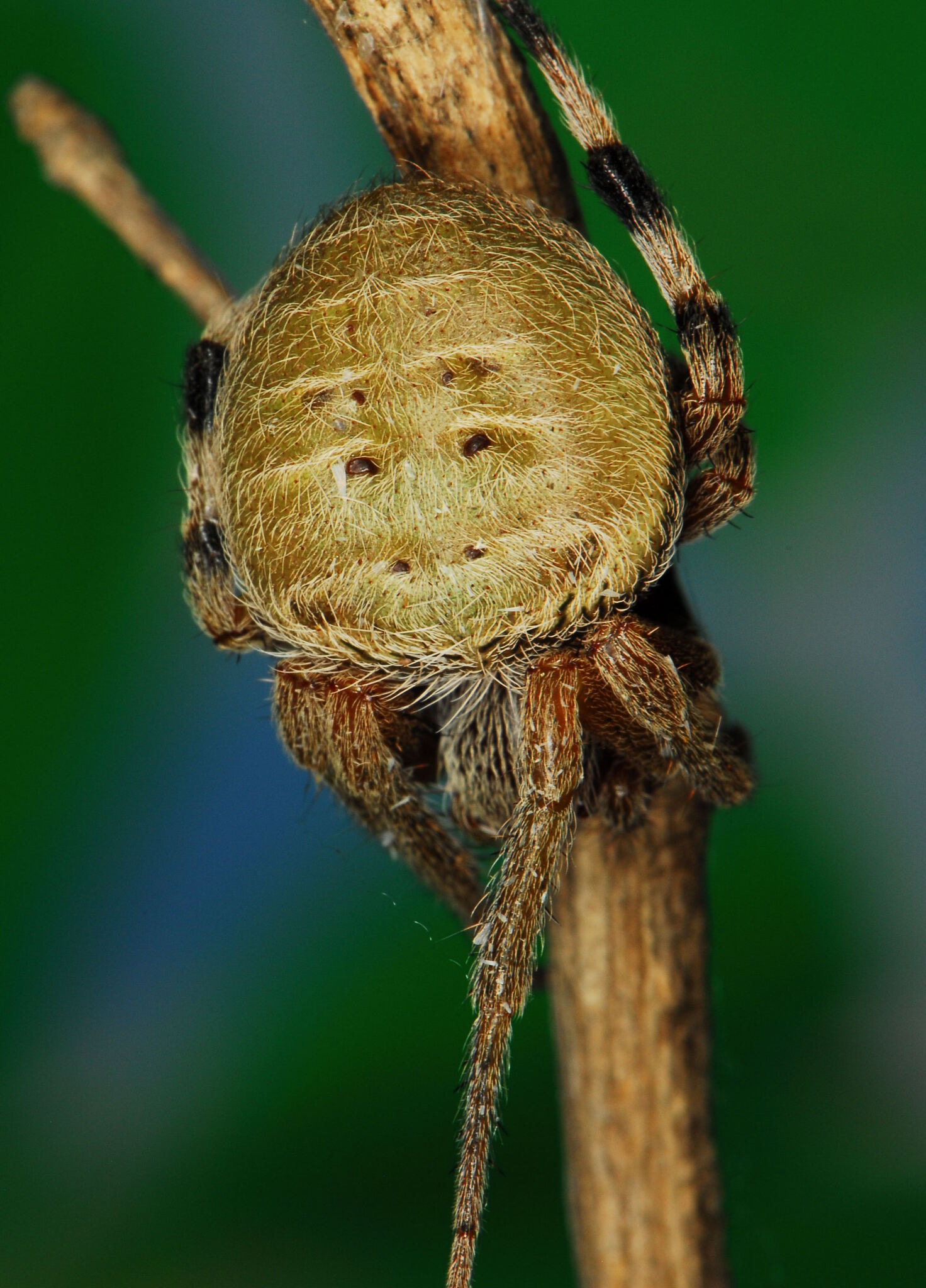
- Female
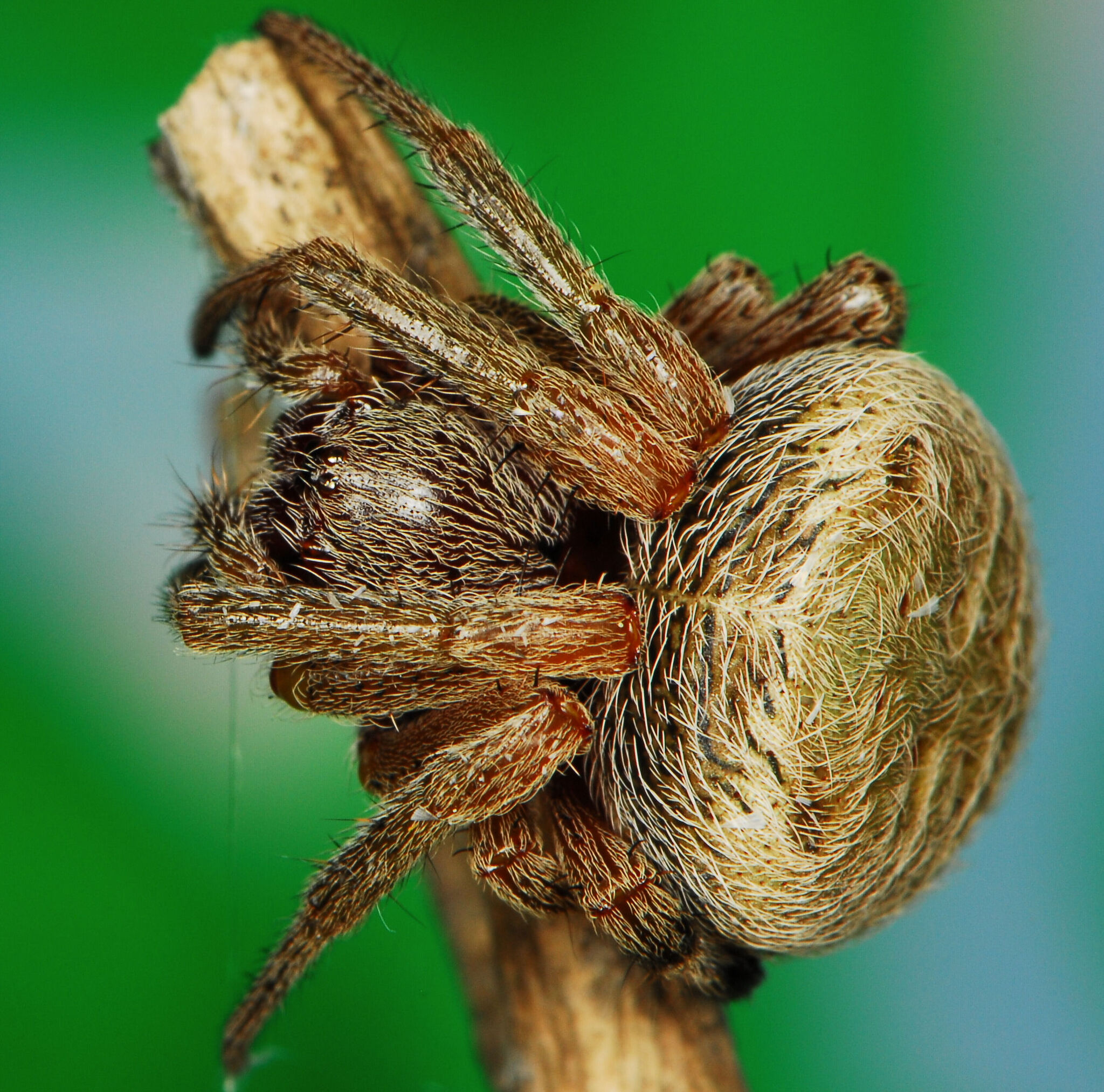
- Female

Scientific classification
- Kingdom: Animalia
- Phylum: Arthropoda
- Subphylum: Chelicerata
- Class: Arachnida
- Order: Araneae
- Infraorder: Araneomorphae
- Family: Araneidae
- Genus: Neoscona
- Species: N. rufipalpis

Binomial name
- Neoscona rufipalpis (Lucas, 1858)

Synonyms
- Epeira semiannulata Karsch, 1879

= Neoscona rufipalpis =

Green Neoscona Orb-Web Spider

Species of spider

Neoscona rufipalpis is a species of spider in the family Araneidae. It is commonly known as the green Neoscona orb-web spider and is an endemic species to Africa.

== Etymology ==
The species name rufipalpis means "red-palped" in Latin, referring to the reddish coloration of the pedipalps.

== Distribution ==
Neoscona rufipalpis has a very wide global distribution throughout the Afrotropical Region, occurring in Botswana, Cameroon, Cape Verde, Gabon, St Helena, Tanzania, Togo, Yemen, and South Africa.

In South Africa, the species is known from seven provinces including seven protected areas at altitudes ranging from 7 to 1,556 m above sea level.

== Habitat and ecology ==
Their orb-webs have widely-spaced spirals of very sticky, bright yellow silk which is monitored by the spider from within a tightly woven retreat of vegetation (usually leaves), held together with strong pale-yellow, non-sticky silk. Some individuals are active even in mid-winter, repairing their webs if they are removed or broken.

The spider lives in a funnel retreat made of silk between leaves on vegetation. The orb-web is made in front of the retreat. Silk threads have a golden shine. They are very commonly found in broad-leaved trees. The species has been sampled from most of the floral biomes except the Desert and Succulent Karoo biomes. The species was also sampled from avocado, citrus and macadamia orchards.

== Description ==
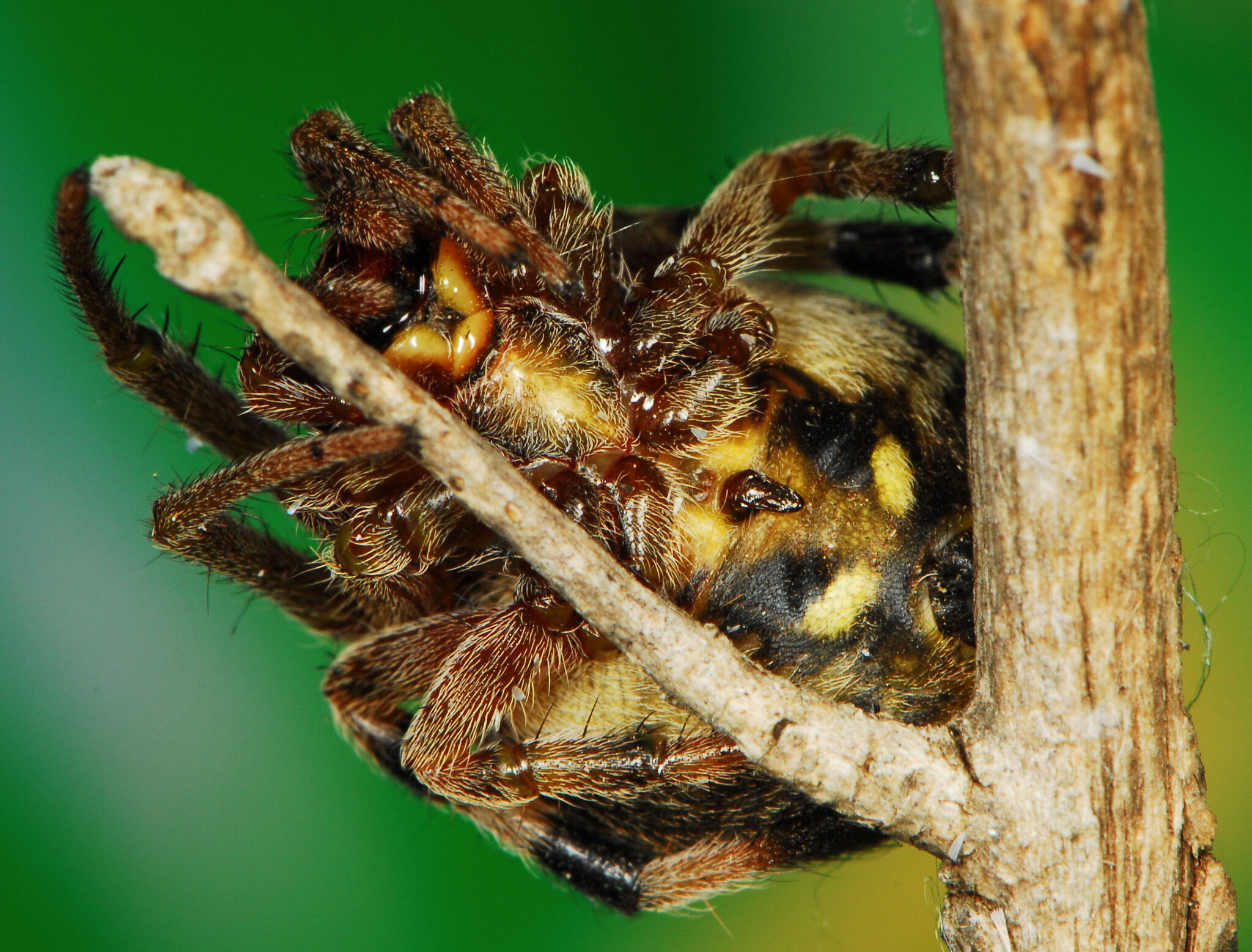
female

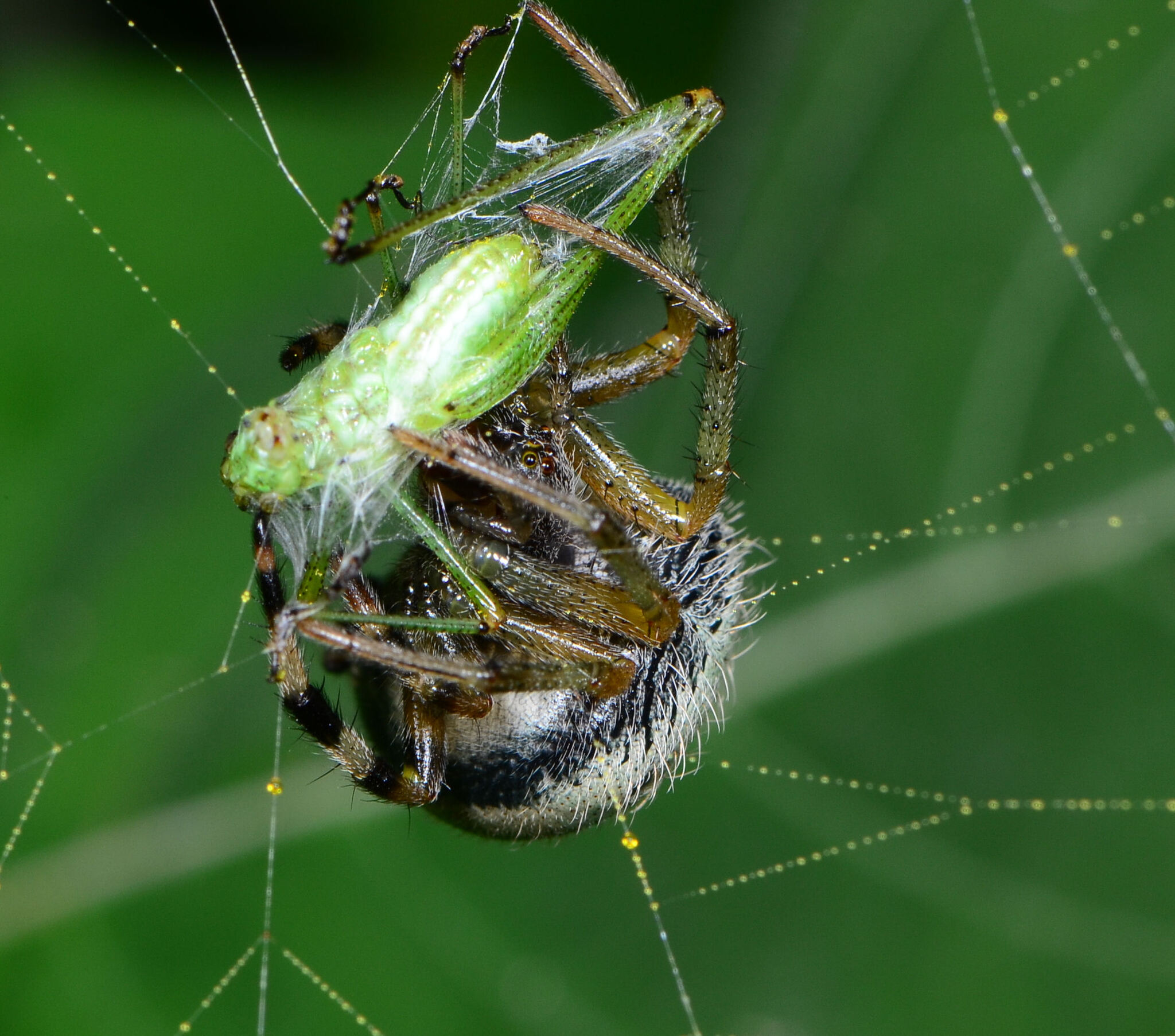
juvenile female

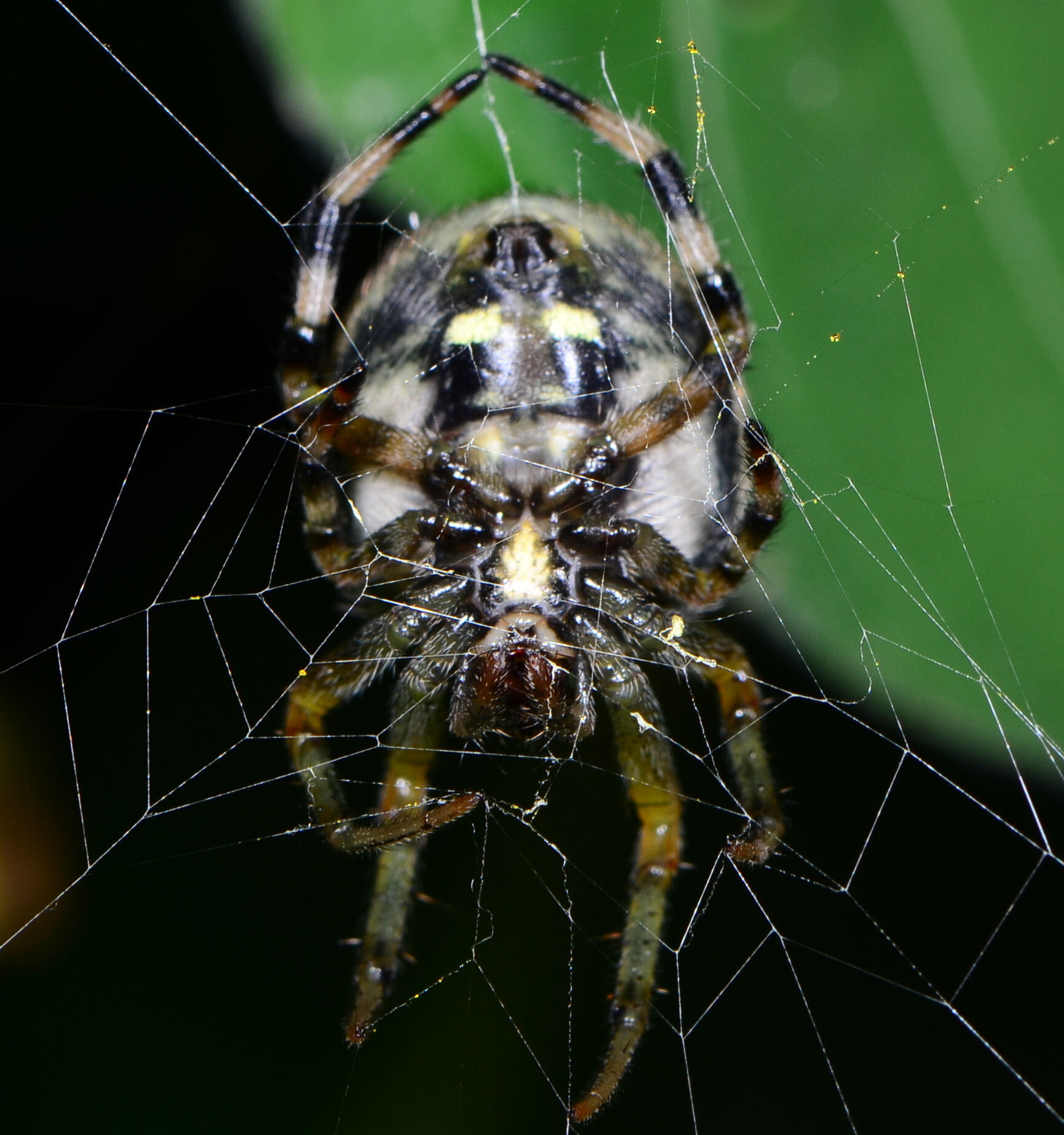
juvenile female

Neoscona rufipalpis is known from both sexes. These are large spiders measuring 11-13 mm in body length.

== Conservation ==
Neoscona rufipalpis is listed as Least Concern by the South African National Biodiversity Institute due to its wide geographical range. There are no significant threats to the species. The species has been sampled from seven protected areas.

== Taxonomy ==
Neoscona rufipalpis was originally described by Lucas in 1858 as Epeira rufipalpis from Gabon. It was revised by Grasshoff in 1986.
