= Neoscona alberti =

Albert's Neoscona Orb-Web Spider

Conservation status
- Least Concern (SANBI Red List)

Scientific classification
- Kingdom: Animalia
- Phylum: Arthropoda
- Subphylum: Chelicerata
- Class: Arachnida
- Order: Araneae
- Infraorder: Araneomorphae
- Family: Araneidae
- Genus: Neoscona
- Species: N. alberti

Binomial name
- Neoscona alberti (Strand, 1913)

Synonyms
- Aranea edwardiana Strand, 1913; Neoscona tuckeri Caporiacco, 1949

Species of spider

Neoscona alberti is a species of spider in the family Araneidae. It is commonly known as Albert's Neoscona orb-web spider.

== Distribution ==
Neoscona alberti occurs across five African countries: Democratic Republic of the Congo, Rwanda, Kenya, Zimbabwe, and South Africa. In South Africa, the species has been recorded from two provinces at altitudes ranging from 552 to 2,826 m above sea level.

The South African distribution includes the Eastern Cape (Grahamstown and Addo Elephant National Park) and KwaZulu-Natal (Giant's Castle Nature Reserve and Drakensberg).

== Habitat and ecology ==
Neoscona alberti is an orb-web species that constructs orb-webs in vegetation during the night, removing the webs early in the morning. The species has been recorded from Grassland and Thicket biomes. A specimen from Grahamstown was observed making its web in Spartina grass.

== Description ==
Neoscona alberti is known from both sexes.

== Conservation ==
Neoscona alberti is listed as Least Concern by the South African National Biodiversity Institute due to its wide geographical range across multiple African countries. In South Africa, the species is protected within the Addo Elephant National Park and Giant's Castle Nature Reserve. There are no known threats to the species.

== Taxonomy ==
The species was originally described by Embrik Strand in 1913 from the Democratic Republic of the Congo as Aranea alberti. It was revised by Grasshoff in 1986, who synonymized several related species including Araneus edwardianus and Neoscona tuckeri.
