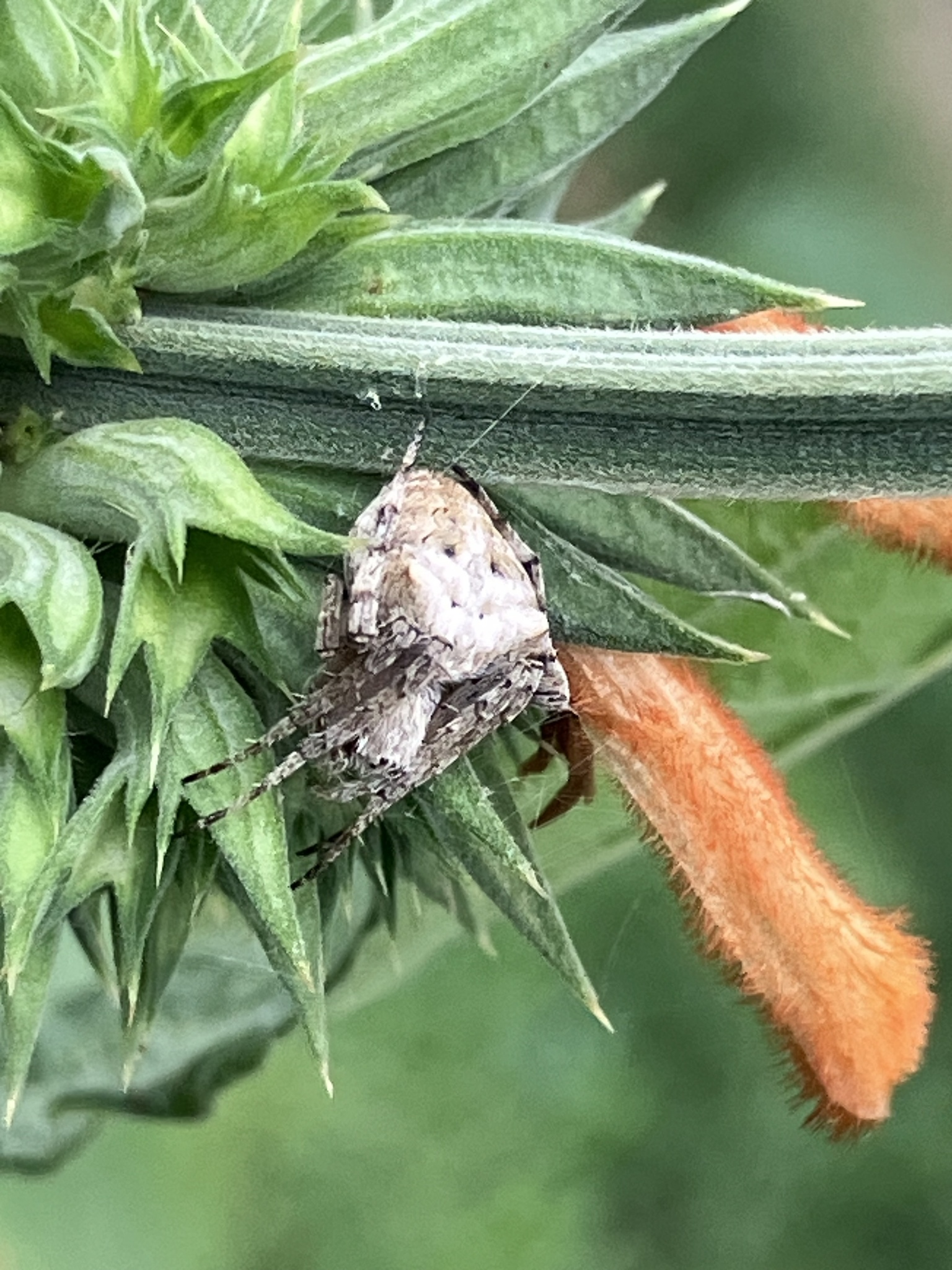

Scientific classification
- Kingdom: Animalia
- Phylum: Arthropoda
- Subphylum: Chelicerata
- Class: Arachnida
- Order: Araneae
- Infraorder: Araneomorphae
- Family: Araneidae
- Genus: Neoscona
- Species: N. quadrigibbosa

Binomial name
- Neoscona quadrigibbosa Grasshoff, 1986

= Neoscona quadrigibbosa =

Four-humped Neoscona Orb-Web Spider

Species of spider

Neoscona quadrigibbosa is a species of spider in the family Araneidae. It is commonly known as the four-humped Neoscona orb-web spider and is an endemic species to Africa.

== Distribution ==
Neoscona quadrigibbosa is presently known from Kenya, Namibia, Eswatini, and South Africa.

In South Africa, the species has only been collected from Limpopo at Makalali Nature Reserve at an altitude of 542 m above sea level.

== Habitat and ecology ==
Neoscona quadrigibbosa consists of orb-web spiders that make orb-webs in vegetation at night. The species has been sampled from the Savanna biome.

== Etymology ==
The species name quadrigibbosa means "four-humped" in Latin.

== Conservation ==
Neoscona quadrigibbosa is listed as Least Concern by the South African National Biodiversity Institute due to its wide global geographic range. The species is possibly under-collected and suspected to occur in more countries in the intervening range. There are no significant threats to the species. The species is protected in Makalali Nature Reserve.

== Taxonomy ==
The species was described by Grasshoff in 1986 from Namibia.
