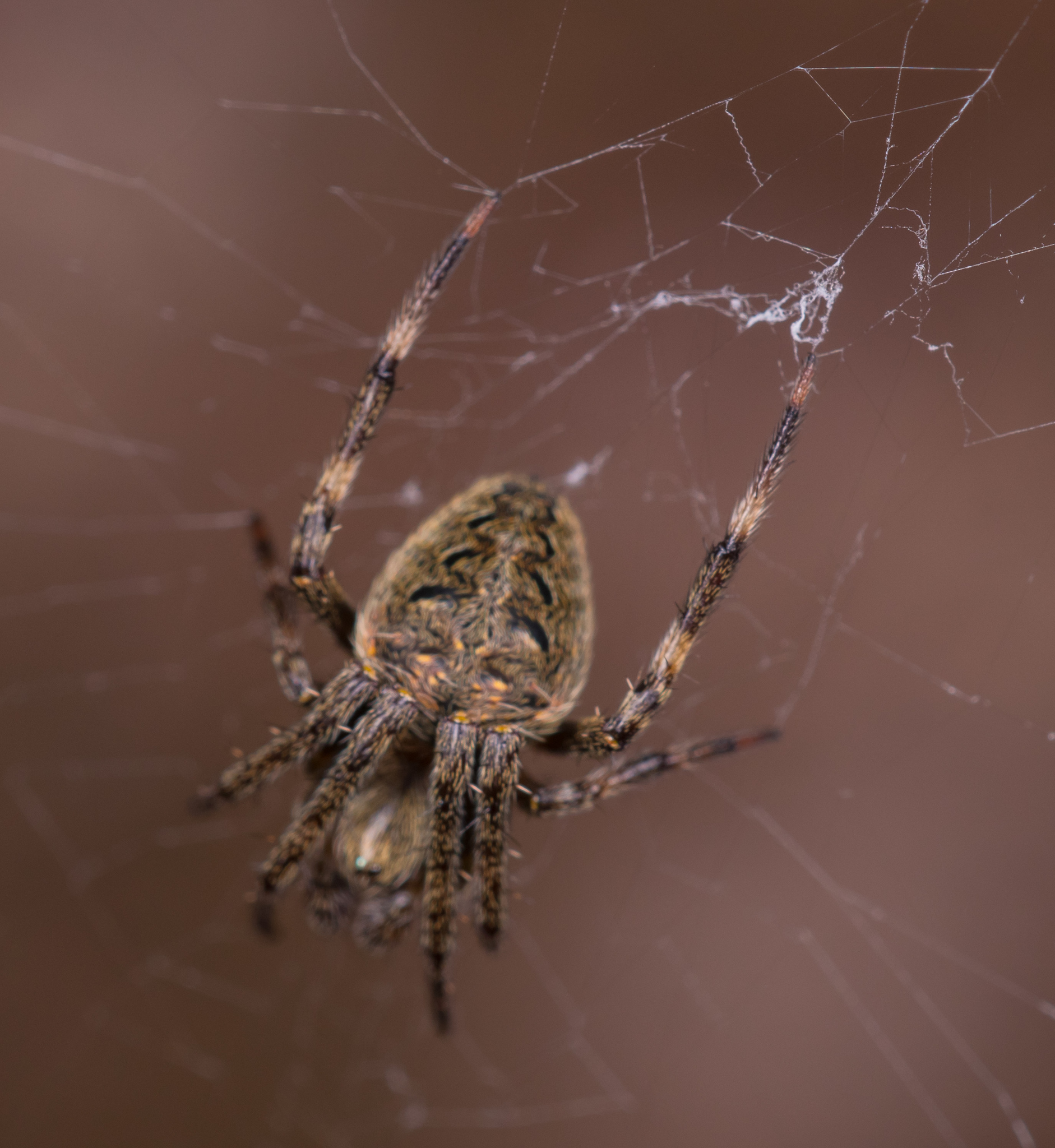
- female from Hong Kong

Scientific classification
- Kingdom: Animalia
- Phylum: Arthropoda
- Subphylum: Chelicerata
- Class: Arachnida
- Order: Araneae
- Infraorder: Araneomorphae
- Family: Araneidae
- Genus: Neoscona
- Species: N. multiplicans

Binomial name
- Neoscona multiplicans (Chamberlin, 1924)

Synonyms
- Aranea multiplicans Chamberlin, 1924; Neoscona minoriscylla Yin et al., 1990

= Neoscona multiplicans =

Species of spider

Neoscona multiplicans is a species of orb weaver spider in the family Araneidae. It is found in China, Korea, and Japan.

== Taxonomy ==
The species was originally described as Aranea multiplicans by Chamberlin in 1924 based on specimens from China. It was later redescribed as Neoscona minoriscylla by Yin et al. in 1990, but Song, Chen & Zhu (1997) established that this was a junior synonym and restored the original name N. multiplicans.

== Distribution ==
N. multiplicans is distributed across East Asia, with records from China, Korea, and Japan. In China, it has been recorded from multiple provinces including Hunan, Guangxi, Hainan, Yunnan, Zhejiang, and Fujian.

== Description ==
=== Female ===
The female has a total body length of 7.25–9.40 mm. The carapace is brown to chestnut colored, clothed with moderately abundant light-colored hairs. Both anterior and posterior eye rows are recurved, with the anterior median eyes larger than the posterior median eyes and anterior lateral eyes. The distance between anterior median eyes equals their diameter.

The carapace is brownish-yellow with reddish-brown edges and covered with fine white hairs. The sternum is blackish-brown with a silvery-white longitudinal stripe in the center. The legs are reddish-brown, with the front legs having 4 teeth, the first and third teeth being larger, and the hind legs having 3 nearly equal teeth.

The abdomen is oval-shaped and brownish-yellow with leaf-like markings. It has a wing-like pattern in front with fine linear markings, and the leaf-like pattern is long and distinct with clear edges and five notches, each notch having dark brown peaks and yellowish-white crescent markings. The leaf pattern has yellowish-brown sides with blackish-brown diagonal stripes. The abdomen shows complex markings including a broad black band extending from the median line of the anterior face across each anterolateral corner and back along the side, characteristically interrupted by transverse pale lines over the posterior part.

=== Male ===
The male is smaller than the female, with a total body length of 5.35–8.35 mm. The coloration and markings are similar to those of the female. The first leg segment has shorter anterior lateral spines and longer posterior lateral spines, with sparse middle spines, having approximately 3 rows distally, with only 1 row in the middle and distal portions.

== Habitat ==
According to field notes from the original description, this species constructs large webs on low bushes, with the spider staying in the web but maintaining a nest in nearby leaves.
