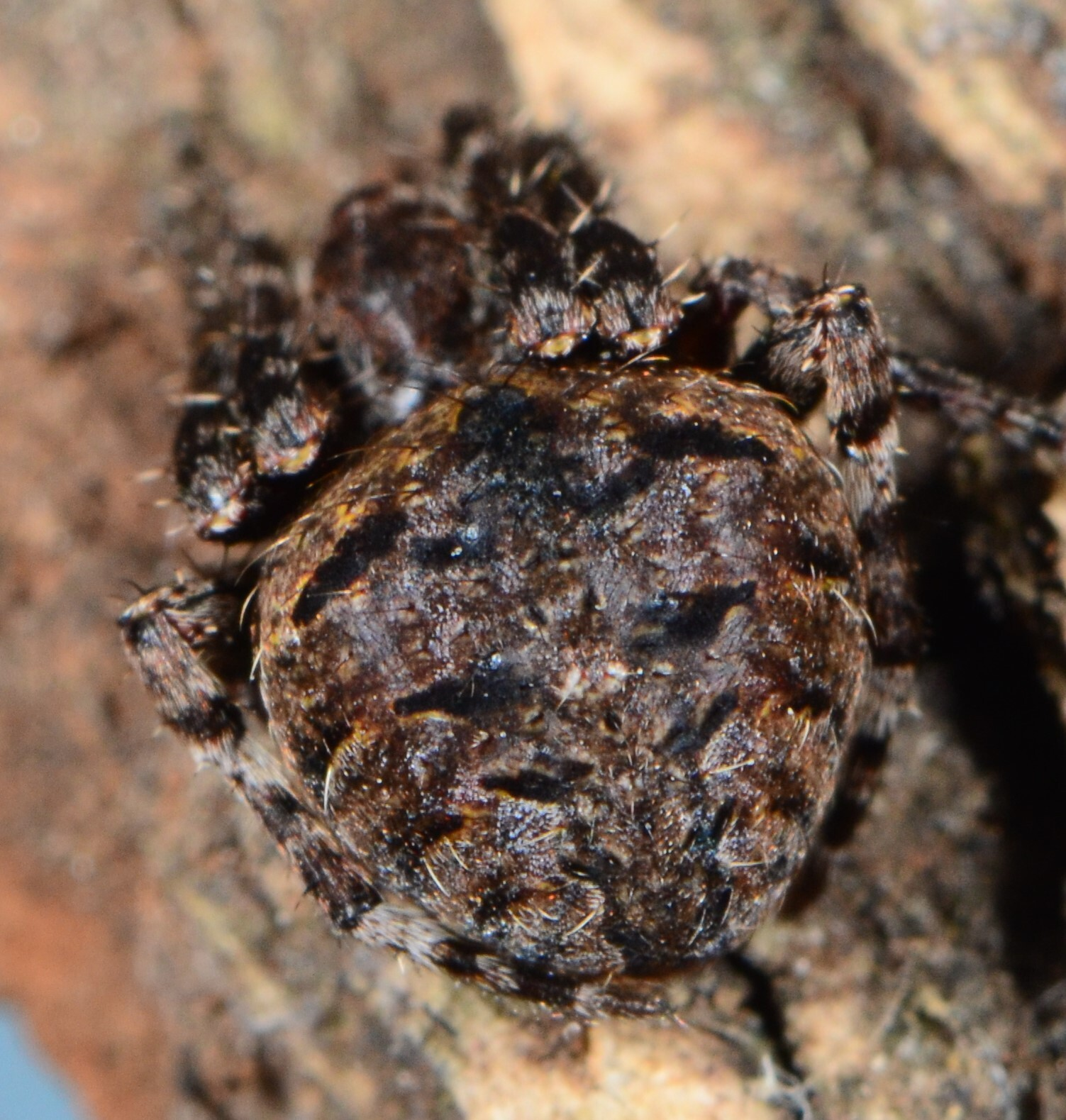
- Female
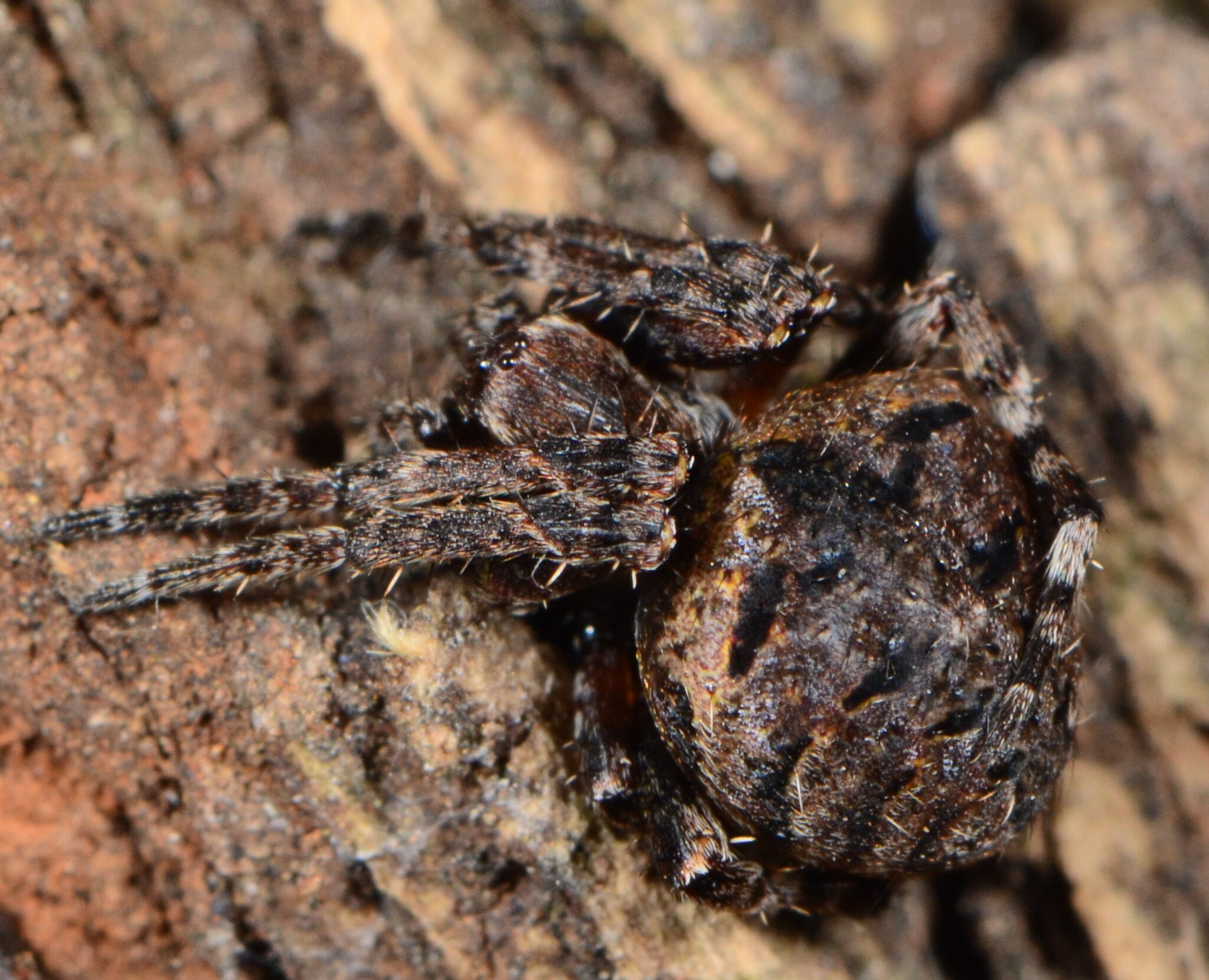
- Female

Scientific classification
- Kingdom: Animalia
- Phylum: Arthropoda
- Subphylum: Chelicerata
- Class: Arachnida
- Order: Araneae
- Infraorder: Araneomorphae
- Family: Araneidae
- Genus: Neoscona
- Species: N. angulatula

Binomial name
- Neoscona angulatula (Schenkel, 1937)

Synonyms
- Neoscona dripaca Roberts, 1983

= Neoscona angulatula =

Neoscona Orb-Web Spider

Species of spider

Neoscona angulatula is a species of spider in the family Araneidae. It is an endemic species to Africa.

== Distribution ==
Neoscona angulatula occurs in five African countries: Kenya, South Africa, Madagascar, and the Seychelles (Aldabra and Assumption Island).

In South Africa, the species has been recorded only from KwaZulu-Natal within two protected areas: uMkhuze Game Reserve and Ophathe Game Reserve.

== Habitat and ecology ==
Neoscona angulatula is an orb-web species which builds orb-webs at night in vegetation. The species is known from the Savanna biome.

== Description ==
Neoscona angulatula is known from both sexes. As an orb-weaver, it constructs circular webs to capture prey.

== Conservation ==
Neoscona angulatula is listed as Least Concern by the South African National Biodiversity Institute due to its wide global geographical range. In South Africa, the species is protected in two reserves: uMkhuze Game Reserve and Ophathe Game Reserve. There are no known threats to the species.

== Taxonomy ==
The species was originally described by Schenkel in 1937 from Madagascar as Araneus angulatulus. It was revised by Grasshoff in 1986, who synonymized Neoscona dripaca with this species.
