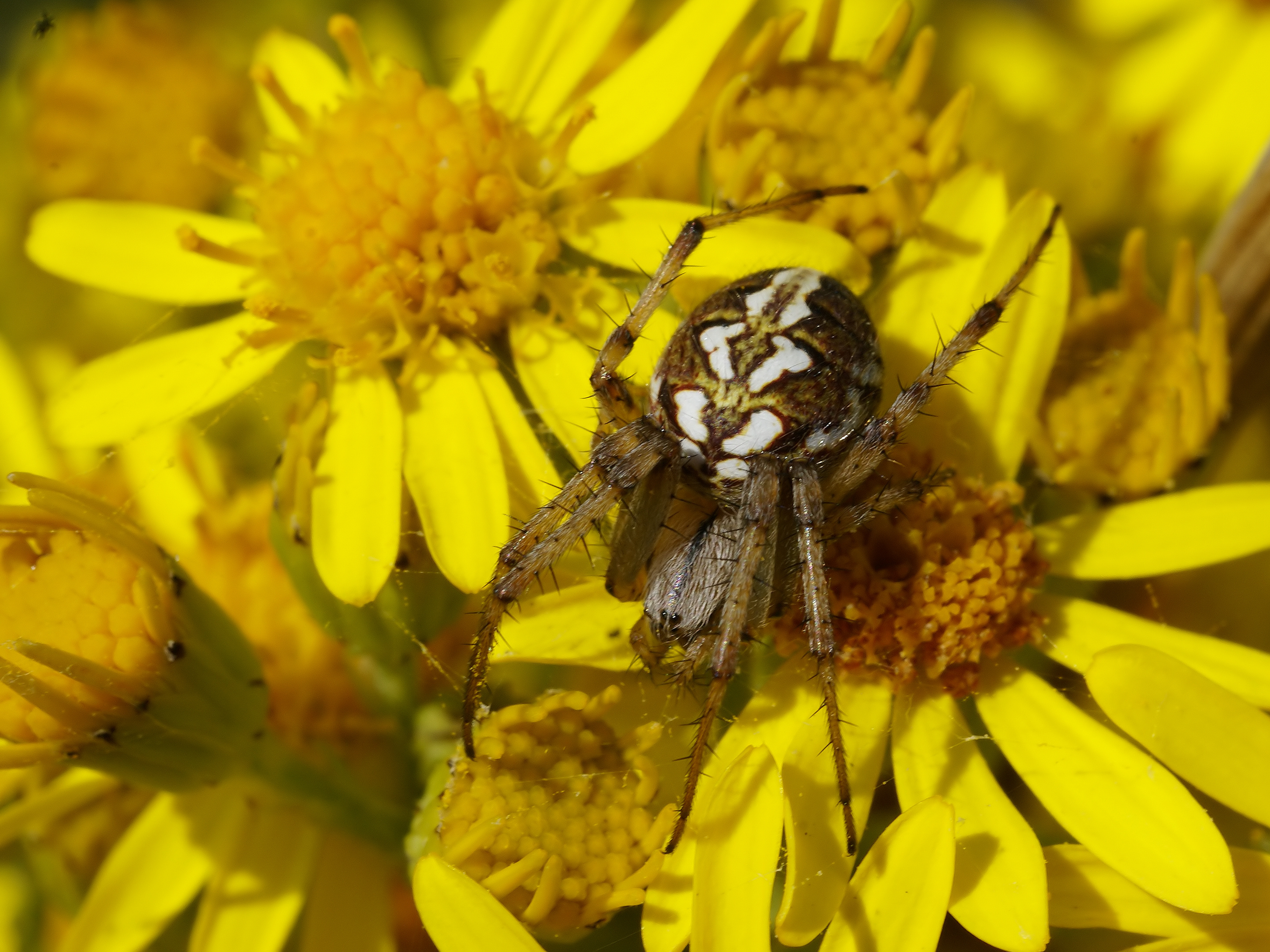
- In Belgium

Scientific classification
- Domain: Eukaryota
- Kingdom: Animalia
- Phylum: Arthropoda
- Subphylum: Chelicerata
- Class: Arachnida
- Order: Araneae
- Infraorder: Araneomorphae
- Family: Araneidae
- Genus: Neoscona
- Species: N. adianta

Binomial name
- Neoscona adianta Walckenaer, 1802

= Neoscona adianta =

Species of spider

Neoscona adianta is a species of spider belonging to the family Araneidae. It occurs in North Africa and Europe to Central Asia.

The coloration includes a brown to red abdomen marked with a series of black-bordered white or cream triangles. The female has a body length (excluding legs) of around 9 millimetres (0.35 in), the male being rather smaller. The web is usually constructed among flower heads, the spider sitting in full view beside the web on a pad of silk.
