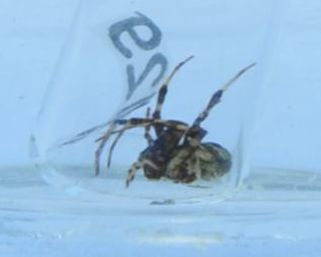
- Specimen of G. eff preserved in alcohol

Scientific classification
- Kingdom: Animalia
- Phylum: Arthropoda
- Subphylum: Chelicerata
- Class: Arachnida
- Order: Araneae
- Infraorder: Araneomorphae
- Family: Araneidae
- Genus: Gea
- Species: G. eff

Binomial name
- Gea eff Levi, 1983

= Gea eff =

Species of spider

Gea eff is a species of orb-weaver spider. It is found in Papua New Guinea. The arachnologist Herbert Walter Levi formally described the species in 1983. While it was still undescribed, Michael H. Robinson and colleagues reported on its courtship and mating behaviors. Gea eff has the shortest scientific name of any spider species.

== Taxonomic history ==
According to Herbert Walter Levi, specimens which Władysław Kulczyński illustrated and tentatively identified as Gea subarmata in the 1910s were in fact G. eff.

Publications by Michael H. Robinson and colleagues in the 1970s and 1980s referred to specimens they found in Wau, Papua New Guinea as belonging to an undescribed taxon. They had enlisted the Capuchin friar Chrysanthus to identify spider specimens and he realized this constituted a new species; he died in 1972 before able to further study it, but thought it belonged to the genus Argiope. Robinson and colleagues referred to it as "Species 'F'" or "Argiope sp. F". Robinson and colleagues later thought it might be in the genus Gea after noticing the similarity to Gea heptagon; after Levi confirmed its generic placement, they subsequently called it "Gea sp. Wau No. 1".

The species was formally described by Levi in 1983; he named it Gea eff. Levi listed the etymology for the specific epithet, eff, as being "an arbitrary combination of letters". Gea eff has the shortest scientific name of all spider species, with a length of only six characters. The female holotype and three female paratypes were deposited in the Museum of Comparative Zoology.

== Distribution ==
The type locality is McAdam Park, near Wau, Morobe Province, Papua New Guinea. G. eff spiders were recorded in the Wau Valley as part of a year-long transect study by Robinson and colleagues. Additional specimens have been collected elsewhere in Morobe Province, as well as in Madang Province and Central Province. In addition to these locations on the island of New Guinea, G. eff has been found on Tagula Island in the Louisiade Archipelago and on the island of New Britain. It is found in tall grass. Specimens have been collected in coconut plantations as well as in forest.

== Description ==
G. eff is a "very small" species. The female is 2.2 times bigger than the male. It is one of the least sexually dimorphic species of the subfamily Argiopinae. The female has a total length of 6.6 mm; it has a brown carapace, a light-colored head, a black sternum with a white longitudinal stripe, and banded legs. The male has a total length of 3.0 mm; its carapace, sternum, and legs are beige, and its dorsum has two white spots.

== Behavior ==
Gea eff builds its webs in the herbaceous layer. It creates a stabilimentum, or web decoration, consisting of an X-shaped pattern, with zig-zag bands forming a cross, which does not block the hub of the web. Their webs are "relatively durable".

Robinson and Robinson placed G. eff in "Group C", meaning it had "advanced" courtship and mating behaviors. G. eff engages in courtship on a mating thread outside the orb-web. It is a sexual cannibal and has an average copulation duration of 0.9 minutes. Sexual cannibalism occurs before copulation. The rate has not been determined as it has only been observed anecdotally.
