= Jacob R. H. Neervoort van de Poll =

Dutch entomologist (1862–1924)

- Born: Jacob R. H. Neervoort van de Poll; 23 June 1862 's-Hertogenbosch, Netherlands
- Died: 12 December 1924 (aged 62); Monaco
- Spouse: Fanny Skillman
- Scientific career
- Fields: Entomology
- Workplaces: Artis, the Amsterdam zoo; a member of the Netherlands Entomological Society and the Société entomologique de France.

Jacob Rudolph Hendrik Neervoort van de Poll (23 June 1862 in 's-Hertogenbosch – 12 December 1924 in Monaco) was a Dutch entomologist who specialised in Coleoptera. He was the vice-president of Artis, the Amsterdam zoo; a member of the Netherlands Entomological Society and the Société entomologique de France. The butterfly Troides vandepolli was named, by Samuel Constantinus Snellen van Vollenhoven, curator of the Leiden Museum, in his honour.

== Life ==
Jacob Neervoort, grew up in Velsen with his aunts. In 1880 his stepfather died at the age of 42 and left the Rijksmuseum a collection of 52 paintings. For this gift his son was allowed to carry the name Van de Poll. Neervoort collected paintings, especially from the Barbizon School and the Hague School, travelled to the Dutch Antilles and joined a diplomatic and trade delegation to Japan. In 1887, he married his wife living in Herengracht on the Golden Bend, then in 1894, they moved to Beukenstein in Driebergen.

Neervoort van de Poll amassed a vast beetle collection, much of it purchased from the Paris insect dealers Auguste Sallé and Émile Deyrolle. It included many expensive beetles, especially (Jewel scarabs). In the Japanese garden, he commissioned a pagode built for his collection. The collection was sold on his death and specimens are now found in many museum collections.

== Works ==
With the exception of a monograph on the Australian buprestid genus Astraeus C. et G. he published mostly short papers describing new species of showy beetles in the families Buprestidae, Cerambycidae and Scarabaeidae either from his own collection or from those of the Leyden museum (now Naturalis or from the Muséum national d'histoire naturelle. These articles appeared in Notes from the Leyden Museum (most), Deutsche Entomologische Zeitschrift, Annales de la Société Entomologique de France, Tijdschrift voor Entomologie and Bulletin de la Société entomologique de Belgique.

== Some beetles from Australia that bear his name ==
- Cyclocranium Swierstrae v.d. Poll
- Aphneope quadrimaculata v.d. Poll
- Zoëdia longipes v.d. Poll
- Zoëdia gracilipes v.d. Poll
- Zoëdia tenuis v.d. Poll
- Ochyra nana v.d. Poll
- Mesolita inermis v.d. Poll
- Mesolita Pascoei v.d. Poll.
- Typhocesis floccosa v.d. Poll
