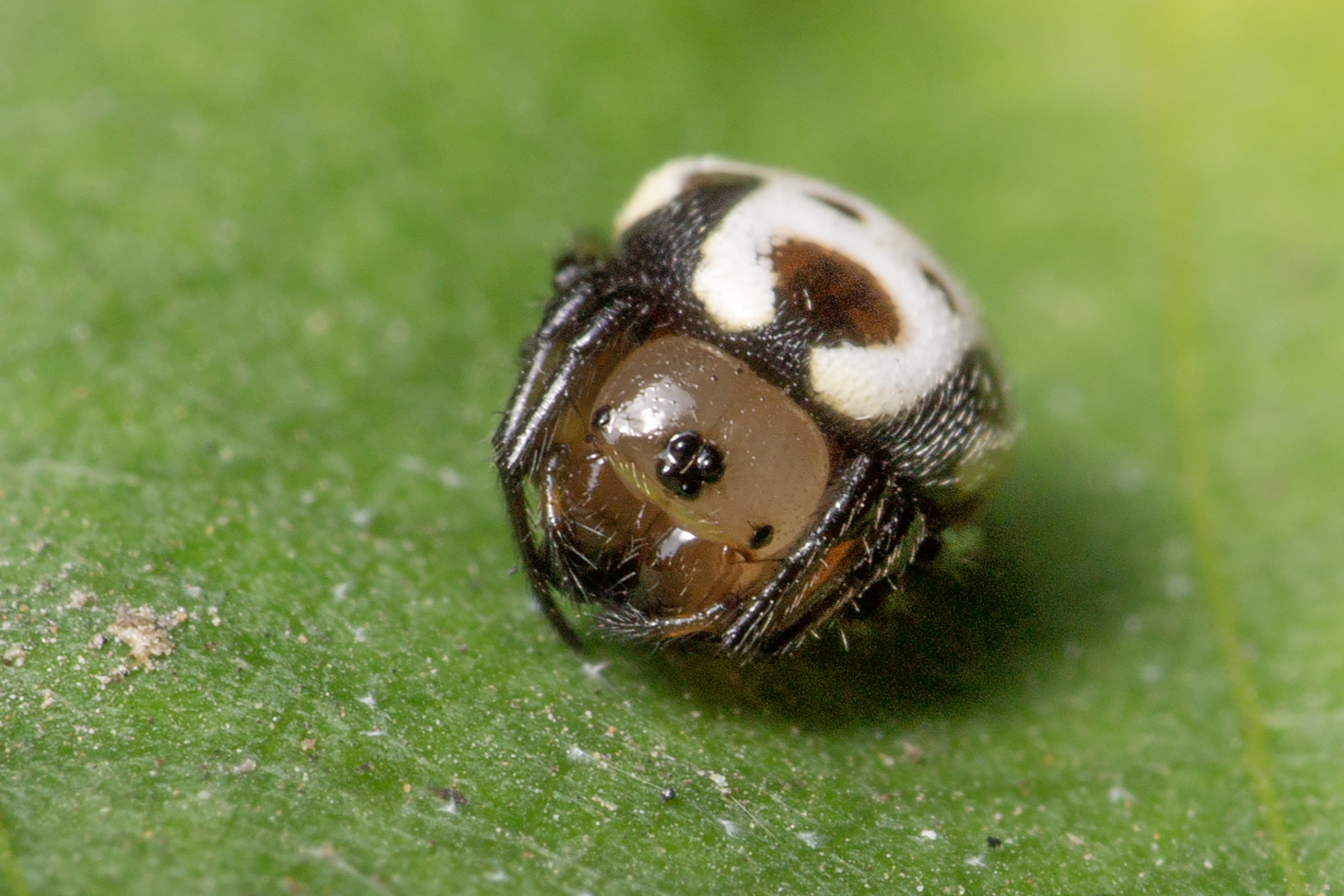
- Frontal view of Anepsion maritatum

Scientific classification
- Kingdom: Animalia
- Phylum: Arthropoda
- Subphylum: Chelicerata
- Class: Arachnida
- Order: Araneae
- Infraorder: Araneomorphae
- Family: Araneidae
- Genus: Anepsion; Strand, 1929

Type species
- Epeira rhomboides L. Koch, 1867

Species
- 16, see text

= Anepsion =

Genus of spiders

Anepsion is a genus of orb-weaver spiders first described by Embrik Strand in 1929.

== Species ==
As of November 2026, it contains sixteen species:

- Anepsion buchi Chrysanthus, 1969 – New Guinea, Solomon Is.
- Anepsion depressum (Thorell, 1877) – China, Myanmar to Indonesia (Sulawesi)
  - Anepsion d. birmanicum (Thorell, 1895) – Myanmar
- Anepsion fuscolimbatum (Simon, 1901) – Malaysia
- Anepsion hammeni Chrysanthus, 1969 – New Guinea
- Anepsion jacobsoni Chrysanthus, 1961 – Indonesia
- Anepsion maculatum (Thorell, 1897) – Myanmar
- Anepsion maritatum (O. Pickard-Cambridge, 1877) – India, Sri Lanka, China to Indonesia (Sulawesi)
- Anepsion peltoides (Thorell, 1878) – Australia, New Guinea, Papua New Guinea (Bismarck Arch.)
- Anepsion reimoseri Chrysanthus, 1961 – New Guinea
- Anepsion rhomboides (L. Koch, 1867) – Samoa
- Anepsion roeweri Chrysanthus, 1961 – Taiwan, Philippines, Papua New Guinea (Riouw Is.)
- Anepsion semialbum (Simon, 1880) – New Caledonia
- Anepsion villosum (Thorell, 1877) – Indonesia (Sulawesi)
- Anepsion wichmanni (Kulczyński, 1911) – New Guinea
- Anepsion wolffi Chrysanthus, 1969 – Solomon Is.
