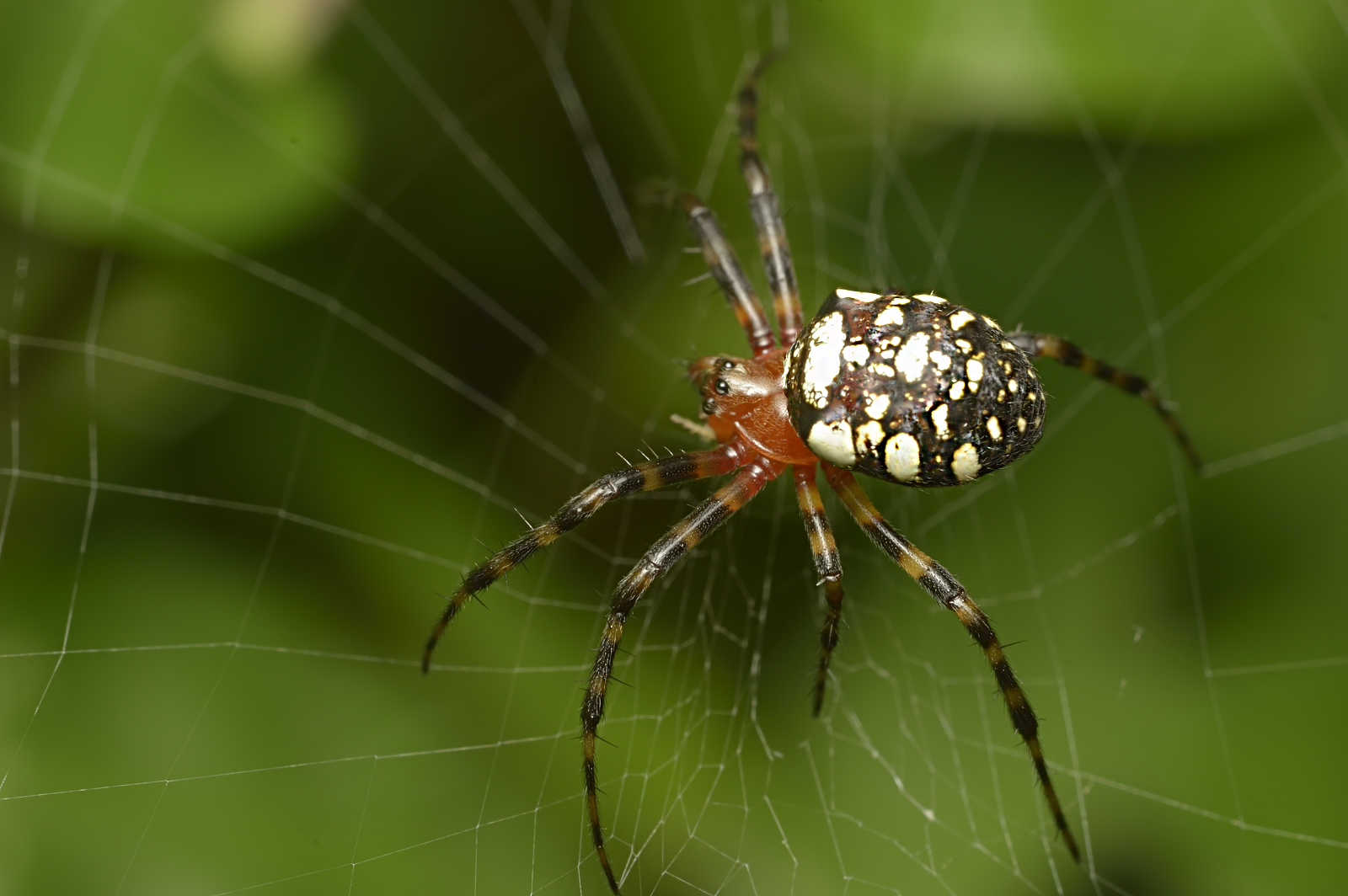
- female from India
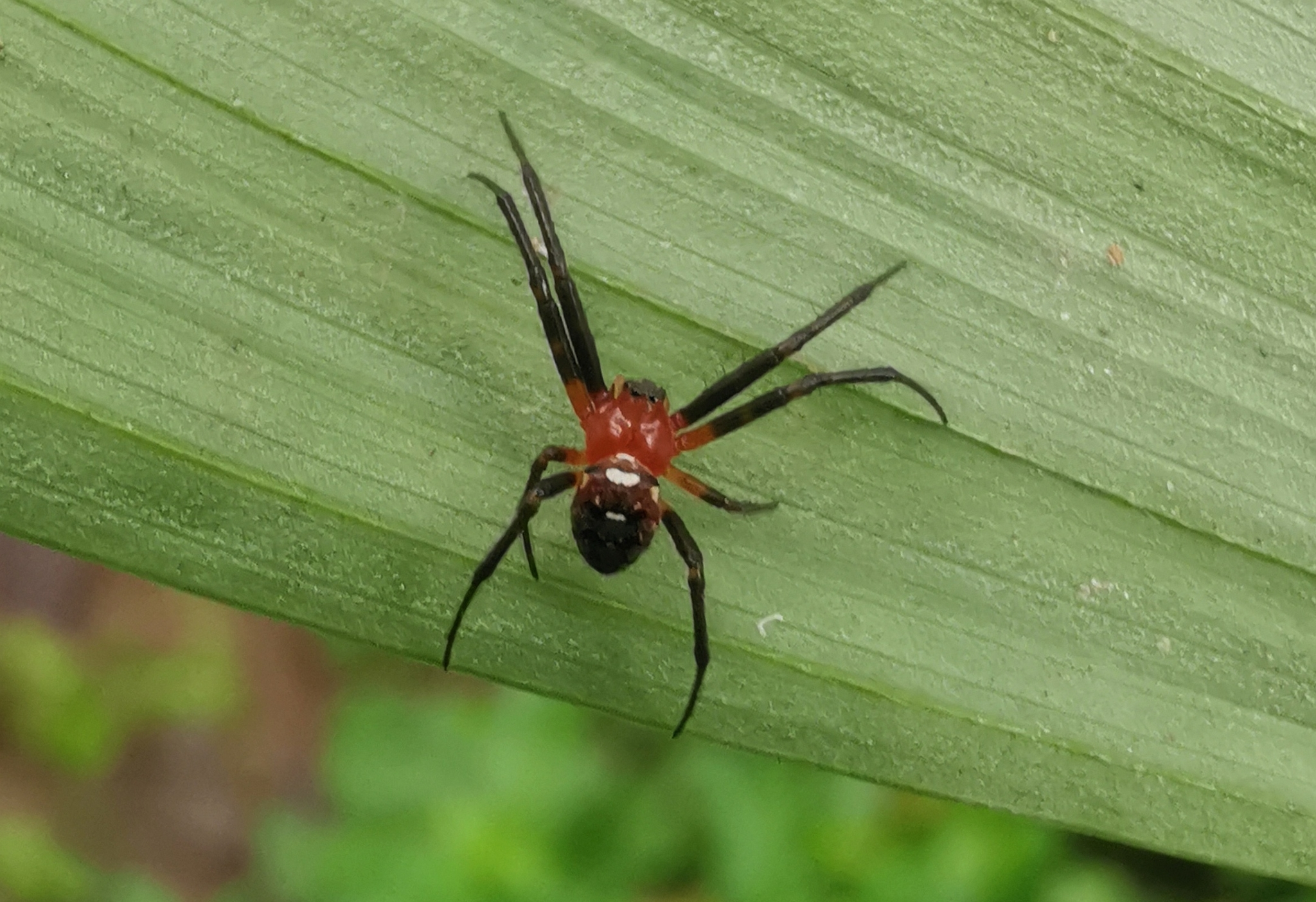
- male from Thailand

Scientific classification
- Kingdom: Animalia
- Phylum: Arthropoda
- Subphylum: Chelicerata
- Class: Arachnida
- Order: Araneae
- Infraorder: Araneomorphae
- Family: Araneidae
- Genus: Gea
- Species: G. spinipes

Binomial name
- Gea spinipes C. L. Koch, 1843

Synonyms
- Pronous chelifer van Hasselt, 1882; Argiope chelifera Thorell, 1890; Gea decorata Thorell, 1890; Gea festiva Thorell, 1895; Gea festiva nigrifrons Simon, 1901

= Gea spinipes =

Species of spider

Gea spinipes is a species of orb-weaver spider in the family Araneidae. It is widely distributed across Asia, from Pakistan to Indonesia. The species is the type species of the genus Gea.

== Etymology ==
The specific name spinipes is derived from Latin, meaning "spiny-footed", referring to the spiny setae on the legs characteristic of this species.

== Distribution ==
G. spinipes has a broad distribution across tropical and subtropical Asia. It has been recorded from Pakistan, India, Myanmar, China, Taiwan, Vietnam, Malaysia, Singapore, and Indonesia (including Sumatra and Borneo). In China, the species is found in the southern provinces of Guangdong, Guangxi, Guizhou, Hainan, and Yunnan.

== Description ==
=== Female ===
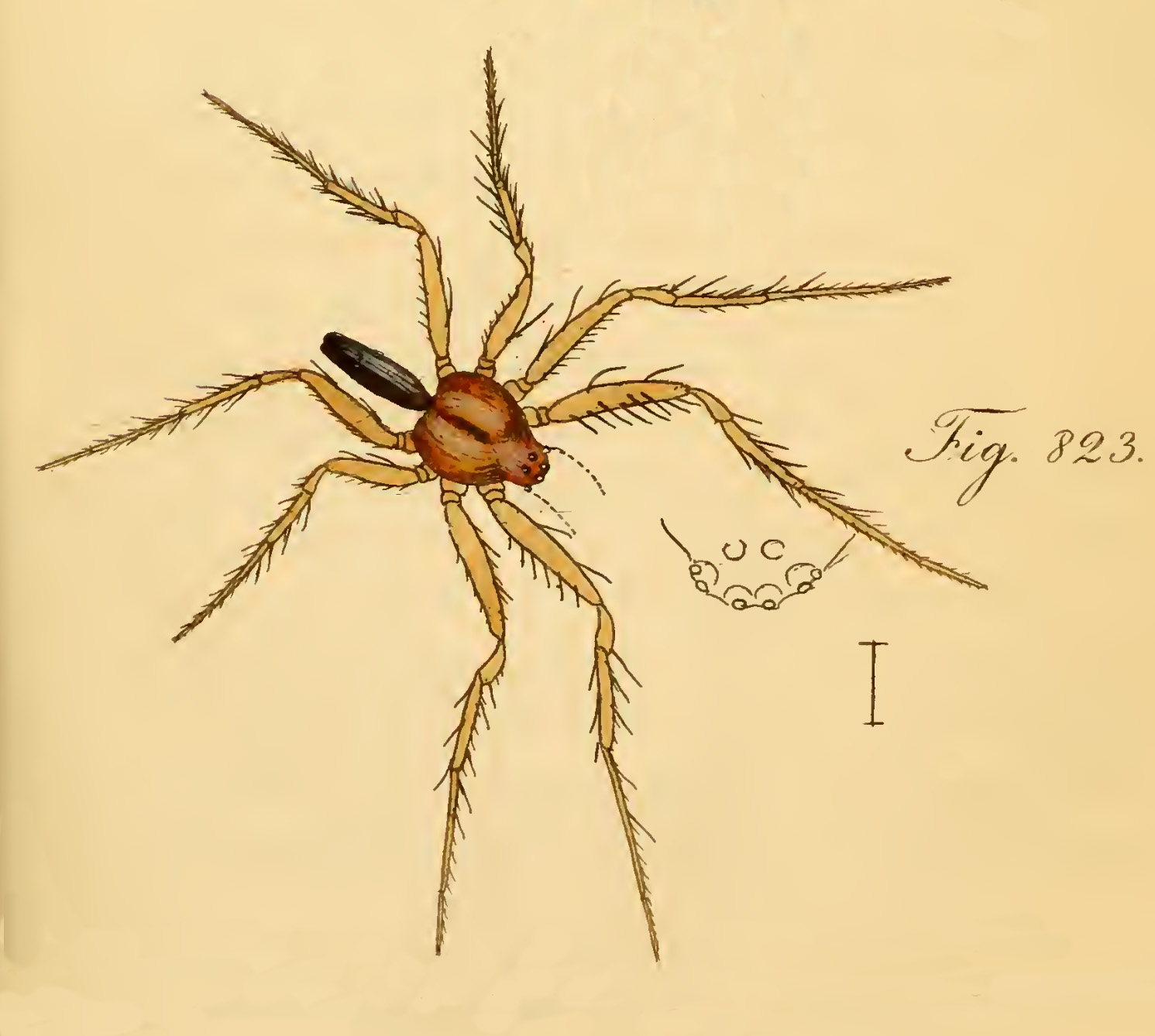
drawing of female by C.L. Koch

The female was originally described by Koch in 1843 from specimens collected in the East Indies. The prosoma is dark ocher-yellow with lighter ocher-yellow legs that have black spiny setae. The opisthosoma is slender and brownish in color. The body length measures approximately 2.25 inches (about 6 cm) according to Koch's original description.

Modern descriptions of females show a total length of 3.65–6.90 mm. The carapace is yellow with inconspicuous dark patches and measures about 2.05 mm long and 1.60 mm wide. The abdomen is shield-shaped and darker than the carapace, typically with two white spots at the front. The epigyne is distinctive, being about 1.3 times wider than long with a clear central dividing structure separating two depressions.

=== Male ===
The male of G. spinipes was first described by van Hasselt in 1882 under the name Pronous chelifer. Males are smaller than females, with a total length of 3.25–4.00 mm. The carapace is yellow and measures about 1.95 mm long and 1.70 mm wide. The abdomen is shield-shaped, approximately 1.54 times longer than wide, and dark with two white spots at the front. The legs are yellow to yellowish-brown, with the third and fourth pairs showing dark bands.

The male pedipalp has several distinctive features including a finger-like structure and a prominent, twisted embolus that makes approximately one complete turn.

== Taxonomy ==
Gea spinipes has a complex taxonomic history with several synonyms. The species was first described by C. L. Koch in 1843, but over the following decades, several other species were described that were later found to be the same species. In 1983, Herbert Levi conducted a comprehensive revision and synonymized Argiope chelifera Thorell, 1890, Gea decorata Thorell, 1890, Gea festiva Thorell, 1895, and Gea festiva nigrifrons Simon, 1901 with G. spinipes.

Recent studies suggest that G. spinipes as currently understood may represent a species complex, as specimens from different geographical locations show variations in genital structures.
