= Mesida =

Scientific classification
- Kingdom: Animalia
- Phylum: Arthropoda
- Subphylum: Chelicerata
- Class: Arachnida
- Order: Araneae
- Infraorder: Araneomorphae
- Family: Tetragnathidae
- Genus: Mesida; Kulczyński, 1911

Type species
- M. humilis Kulczyński, 1911

Species
- 13, see text

Genus of spiders

Mesida is a genus of long-jawed orb-weavers that was first described by Władysław Kulczyński in 1911.

== Species ==
As of October 2019 it contains thirteen species and one subspecies, found in Africa, Asia, Papua New Guinea, and Australia:

- Mesida argentiopunctata (Rainbow, 1916) – Australia (Queensland)
- Mesida culta (O. Pickard-Cambridge, 1869) – India, Sri Lanka
- Mesida gemmea (Hasselt, 1882) – Myanmar to Indonesia (Java), Taiwan
- Mesida grayi Chrysanthus, 1975 – New Guinea
- Mesida humilis Kulczyński, 1911 (type) – New Guinea
- Mesida matinika Barrion & Litsinger, 1995 – Philippines
- Mesida mindiptanensis Chrysanthus, 1975 – New Guinea
- Mesida pumila (Thorell, 1877) – Indonesia (Sumatra) to New Guinea
- Mesida realensis Barrion & Litsinger, 1995 – Philippines
- Mesida thorelli (Blackwall, 1877) – Seychelles, Mayotte
  - Mesida t. mauritiana (Simon, 1898) – Mauritius
- Mesida wilsoni Chrysanthus, 1975 – New Guinea, Papua New Guinea (Bismarck Arch.)
- Mesida yangbi Zhu, Song & Zhang, 2003 – China
- Mesida yini Zhu, Song & Zhang, 2003 – China, Laos
