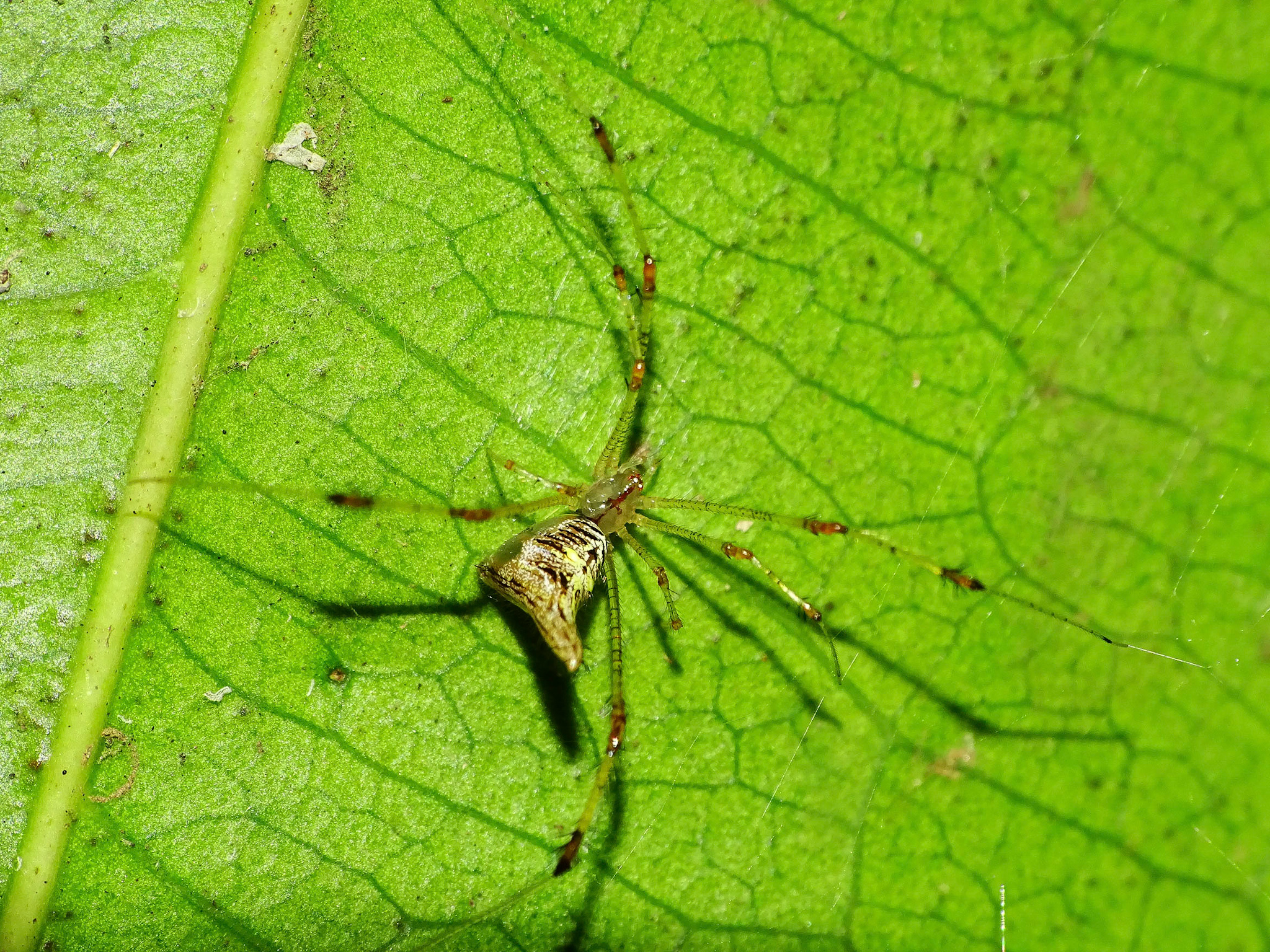
- Meotipa sp.

Scientific classification
- Kingdom: Animalia
- Phylum: Arthropoda
- Subphylum: Chelicerata
- Class: Arachnida
- Order: Araneae
- Infraorder: Araneomorphae
- Family: Theridiidae
- Genus: Meotipa; Simon, 1895

Type species
- M. picturata Simon, 1895

Species
- 20, see text

= Meotipa =

Genus of spiders

Meotipa is a genus of comb-footed spiders that was first described by Eugène Simon in 1895.

== Distribution ==
Spiders in this genus are found in Asia, Papua New Guinea, and on the Pacific Islands.

== Description ==
Females measure 2.5 to 6.0 mm in length, while males range from 1.1 to 1.8 mm.

Females of Meotipa differ from all other theridiids by the unusual outline of the abdomen, with the tip projected upward and backward over the spinnerets similar to some Argyrodes. Apically, there is a rounded knob bearing conspicuous black flattened spines or scales, often also present on the rear face of the abdomen. One or two pairs of lateral abdominal humps are characteristic.

The carapace bears relatively large eyes that are somewhat variable, being uniform in size or with middle eyes larger than side eyes. The eyes often have a reddish tinge. The anterior median eyes are darker than the other eyes, which are pearly white. The abdomen is vividly coloured in white and black, often with red.

The legs are often very long with leg I longer than leg IV.

== Life style ==
These spiders exhibit strange resting behaviour, pivoting the body axis over 90 degrees so that it rests with one side turned towards the leaf surface, with legs wrapped in a semicircle on the leaf surface.

== Species ==
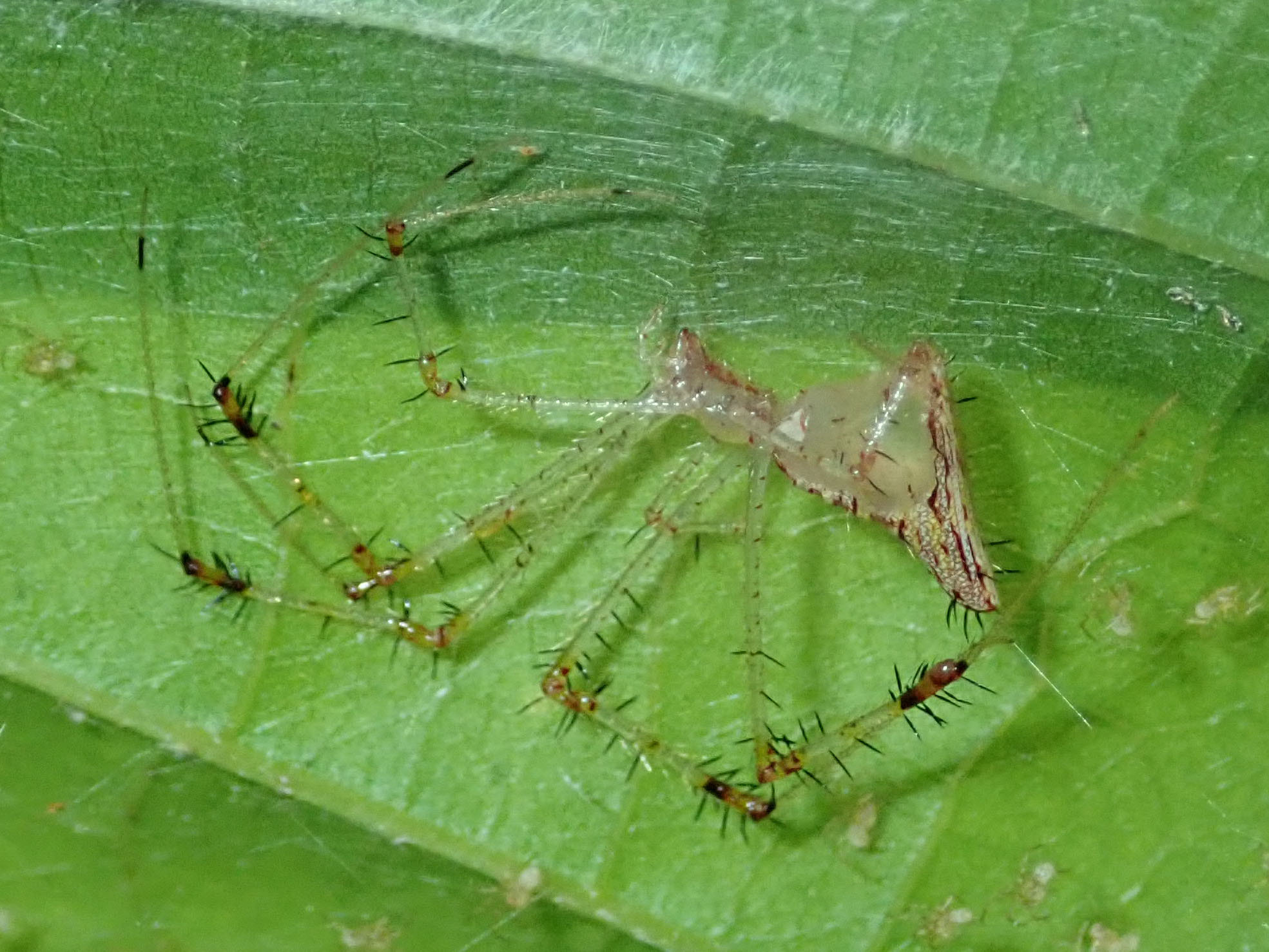
M. picturata

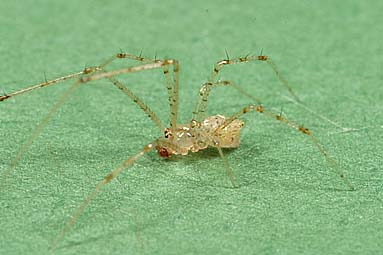
male M. pulcherrima

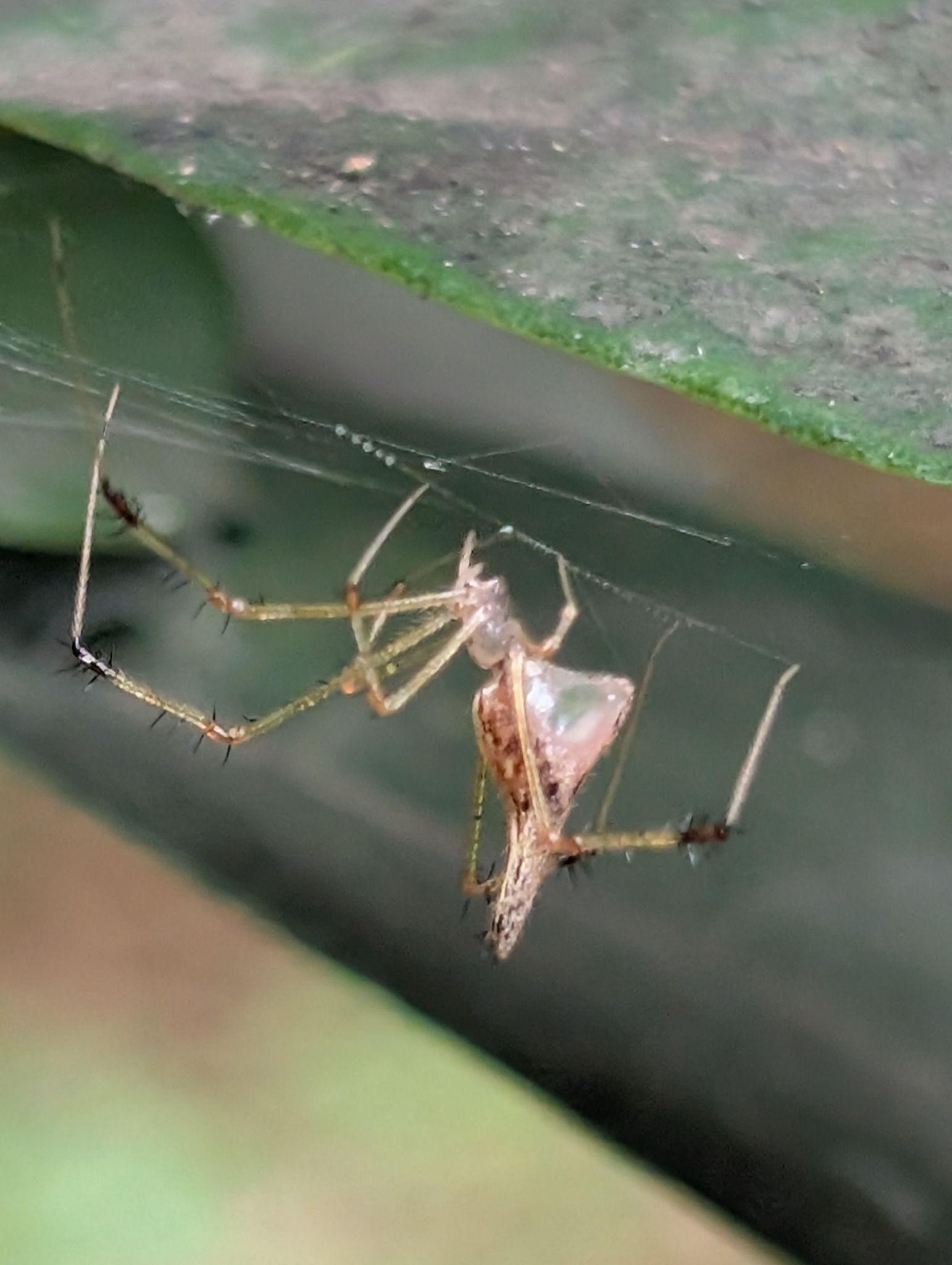
M. sahyadri

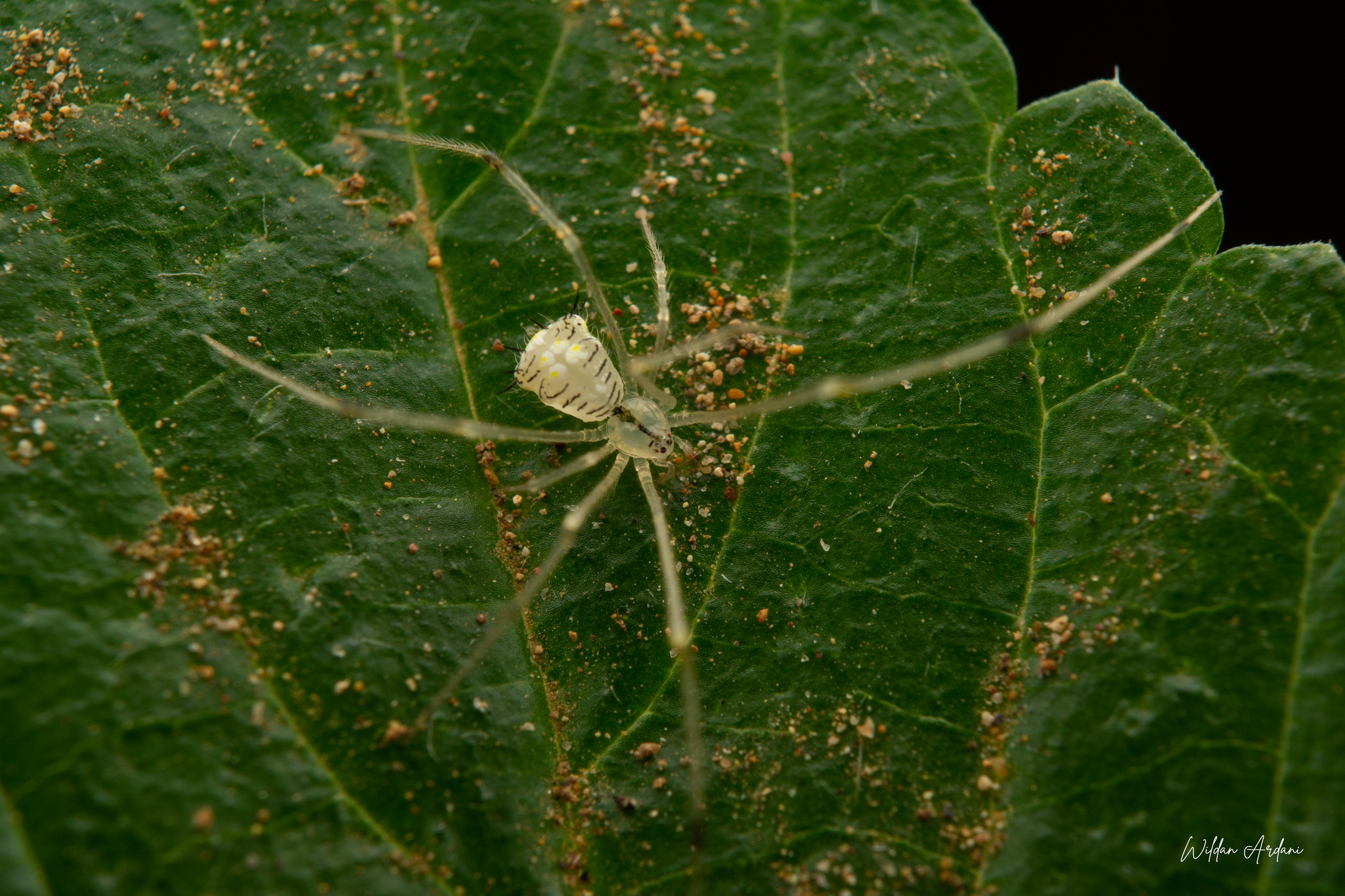
femaleM. spiniventris

As of October 2025, this genus includes 27 species:

- Meotipa andamanensis (Tikader, 1977) – India (Andaman Is.)
- Meotipa argyrodiformis (Yaginuma, 1952) – India, China, Japan, Philippines
- Meotipa bituberculata Deeleman-Reinhold, 2009 – Indonesia (Sumatra, Java)
- Meotipa capacifaba Li, Liu, Xu & Yin, 2020 – China
- Meotipa impatiens Deeleman-Reinhold, 2009 – Malaysia, Indonesia (Sumatra, Borneo)
- Meotipa kudawaensis Benjamin & Tharmarajan, 2024 – Sri Lanka
- Meotipa lingulata Liang, Yin & Xu, 2024 – China
- Meotipa luoqiae Lin & Li, 2021 – China
- Meotipa makiling (Barrion-Dupo & Barrion, 2015) – Philippines
- Meotipa menglun Lin & Li, 2021 – China
- Meotipa multuma Murthappa, Malamel, Prajapati, Sebastian & Venkateshwarlu, 2017 – India, Sri Lanka
- Meotipa pallida Deeleman-Reinhold, 2009 – Indonesia (Sumatra, Borneo)
- Meotipa picturata Simon, 1895 – India, Sri Lanka, China, Thailand, Laos, Indonesia (type species)
- Meotipa pseudomultuma Liang, Yin & Xu, 2024 – China
- Meotipa pseudopicturata Deng, Agnarsson, Chen & Liu, 2022 – China
- Meotipa pulcherrima (Mello-Leitão, 1917) – Japan, Korea, China, Taiwan, Indonesia (New Guinea), Pacific Is. Introduced to the Americas and Tropical Africa
- Meotipa rufopicta (Thorell, 1895) – Myanmar
- Meotipa sahyadri Kulkarni, Vartak, Deshpande & Halali, 2017 – India
- Meotipa spiniventris (O. Pickard-Cambridge, 1869) – Sri Lanka, India, China, Taiwan, Japan
- Meotipa striata Deng, Agnarsson, Chen & Liu, 2022 – China
- Meotipa sujii Benjamin & Tharmarajan, 2024 – Sri Lanka
- Meotipa thalerorum Deeleman-Reinhold, 2009 – Malaysia, Indonesia (Sumatra, Java)
- Meotipa tortuosa Liang, Yin & Xu, 2024 – China
- Meotipa ultapani Basumatary & Brahma, 2019 – India
- Meotipa vesiculosa Simon, 1895 – Japan, China, Taiwan, Vietnam, Philippines, Indonesia
- Meotipa wuzhishanensis Benjamin, 2024 – China
- Meotipa zhengguoi Lin & Li, 2021 – China

In synonymy:

- M. clementinae (Petrunkevitch, 1930) = Meotipa pulcherrima (Mello-Leitão, 1917)
- M. jianglensis (Zhu & Song, 1993) = Meotipa vesiculosa Simon, 1895
- M. mussau Chrysanthus, 1975 = Meotipa pulcherrima (Mello-Leitão, 1917)
