= Father Chrysanthus =

Dutch arachnologist (1905–1972)

Father Chrysanthus OFMCap
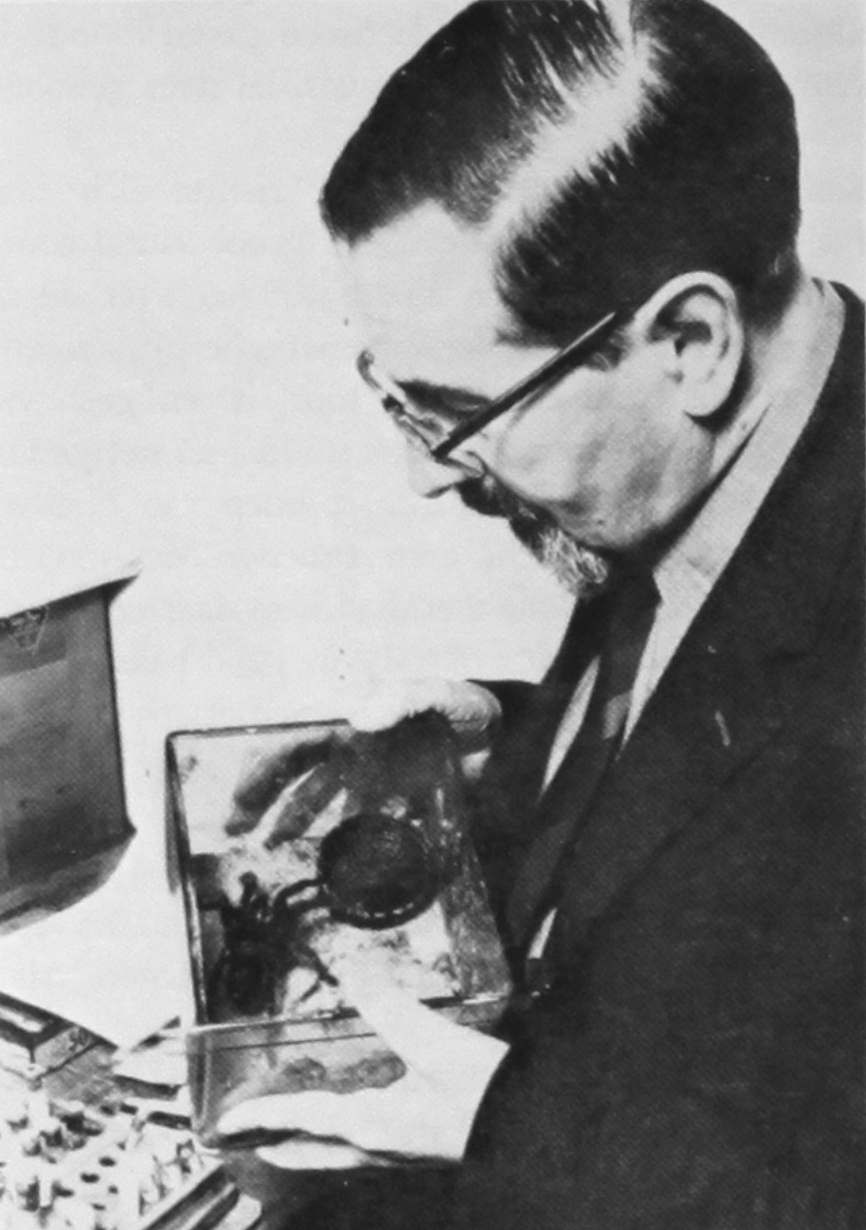
- Chrysanthus holding a spider
- Born: Wilhelmus Egbertus Antonius Janssen; 1 September 1905; Mill, North Brabant, The Netherlands
- Died: 4 May 1972 (aged 66); Oosterhout, North Brabant, The Netherlands

Wilhelmus Egbertus Antonius Janssen (1 September 1905 – 4 May 1972), better known as Father Chrysanthus (Note: Also known as Pater Chrysanthus.) OFMCap, was a Dutch priest and biology teacher. He was known for his studies in arachnology. Initially he was concerned with the spiders of the Netherlands but he became a specialist on New Guinea spiders. Two spider species were named in his honor following his death.

== Early life and education ==
Wilhelmus Egbertus Antonius Janssen was born in Mill, North Brabant, on 1 September 1905. He studied at a minor seminary from 1918 to 1924, and joined the Order of Friars Minor Capuchin on 7 September 1924. After studying philosophy and theology at the major seminary, he became ordained on 12 March 1932. He lived at the Capuchin Order monastery in Oosterhout. Chrysanthus taught biology at the minor seminary (now known as Sint-Oelbertgymnasium) from 1932 to 1972.

== Research on spiders ==
Chrysanthus began studying Dutch spiders in 1939 after being inspired by Fritz Lock's book Aus dem leben der Spinnen, published the same year. He started off writing for magazines like De Levende Natuur. In 1950, he wrote Spinachtigen en Duizendpoten ("Arachnids and Centipedes") for the series Wat Leeft en Groeit; this book was favorably reviewed in Vakblad voor Biologen. Peter J. van Helsdingen called it "excellent" in 1977. The first edition of Chrysanthus's Nederlandse Spinnen ("Dutch Spiders"), written for the Koninklijke Nederlandse Natuurhistorische Vereniging's Wetenschappelijke mededelingen series, was published in 1954. Additional editions were published in 1963, 1971, and 1980. The Dutch entomologist Barend Lempke favorably reviewed all four editions.

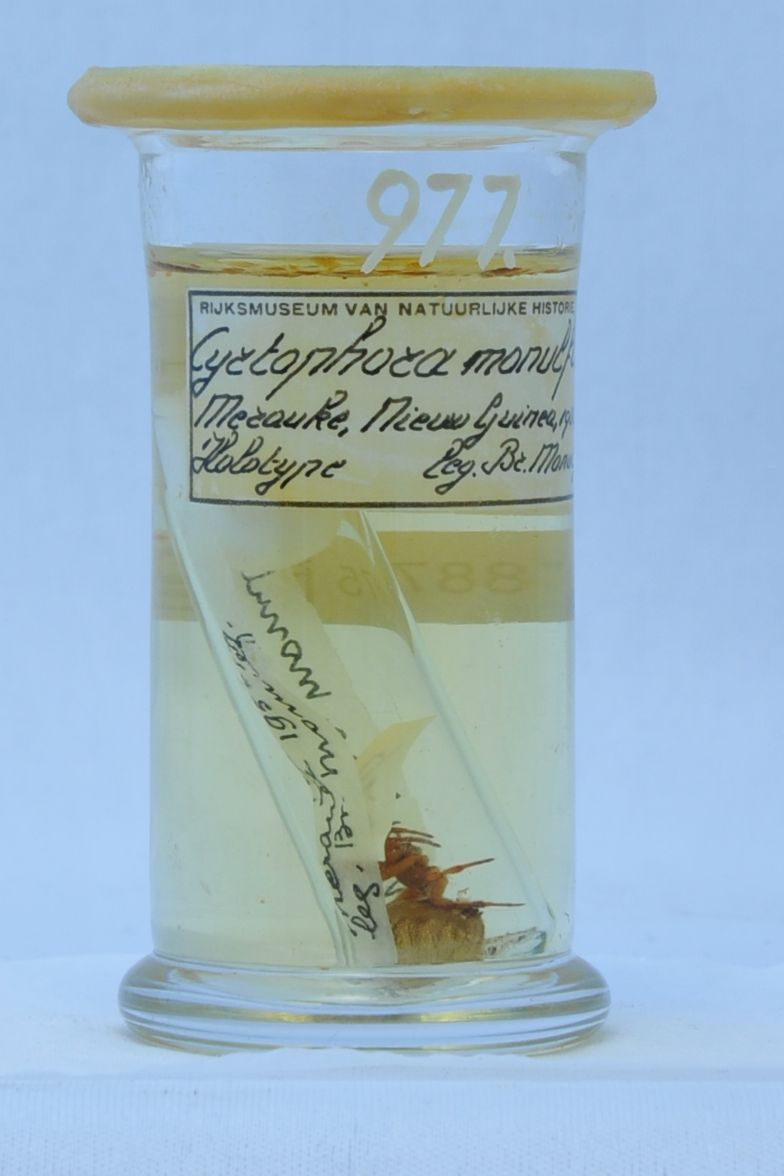
Chrysanthus named Cyrtophora monulfi after Monulf, who provided specimens from New Guinea

In 1957, Chrysanthus became interested in the spiders of New Guinea after Brother Monulf (Note: Monulf was also known as Monulphus.) sent him a collection of spiders he amassed during missionary work in Merauke and Mindiptana in Western New Guinea; Chrysanthus had previously met Monulf in Wellerlooi in 1953. Chrysanthus travelled to natural history museums in Frankfurt, Genoa, London, and Paris to consult their collections. Missionaries, museum guests, and scientific expeditions provided him with newer collections of New Guinea spiders as well. As Chrysanthus became known for his work on New Guinea spiders, museums were interested in providing him with specimens as they lacked specialists in this area. Researchers who consulted him to identify New Guinea spiders included the ethnobiologist Ralph Bulmer, the biologist Yael Lubin, and the zoologist Michael H. Robinson. In 1982, Robinson wrote "almost all of the recent work on the taxonomy of New Guinea spiders" was due to Chrysanthus, and that after his death there was no one who knew as much about the taxonomy New Guinea spiders. Valerie Todd Davies, in a 1997 book review, wrote that it "is regretted" that the authors of a book on spiders of Southeastern Asia did not cite Chrysanthus's papers on New Guinea spiders.

Within taxonomy, he helped show that Metellina mengei and Metellina segmentata were in fact distinct species and not merely varieties of one species; this was in a 1953 paper in Zoologische Mededelingen. G. H. Locket and A. F. Millidge, who had previously considered them to be the same species, listed them as distinct species in the third volume of British Spiders because of the analysis in Chrysanthus's paper. Chrysanthus is also known for work in the genus Coelotes. He cleared up the taxonomic confusion with the identities and synonymy of C. atropos, C. saxatilis, and C. terrestris; this was published in a 1965 paper in Tijdschrift voor Entomologie. This led him to write a proposal in The Bulletin of Zoological Nomenclature as an amendment to Herbert W. Levi and Otto Kraus's proposal concerning Coelotes. In 1979, the International Commission on Zoological Nomenclature accepted Chrysanthus's version of the proposal.

In 1955, Chrysanthus joined the editorial board of the journal Tijdschrift voor Entomologie — a position he would hold until 1971. Chrysanthus attended the first international congress of the International Society of Arachnology in Bonn, Germany, in 1960; he was the only non-German to attend. In 1965, he attended the 3rd Congress of European Arachnologists, held in Frankfurt. He was also a visiting researcher at the Naturmuseum Senckenberg. He was a member of the Netherlands Entomological Society, having joined in 1946. In 1967, he was given the position of Scientific Collaborator at the Rijksmuseum van Natuurlijke Historie. Over the course of his lifetime, he wrote over one hundred papers. The World Spider Catalog includes 77 species which Chrysanthus described; as of 2022, 64 of them remain valid names.

== Death and legacy ==
Chrysanthus died on 4 May 1972, at the age of 66, in his monastery in Oosterhout following a long illness. Ludwig van der Hammen and Peter J. van Helsdinger wrote an obituary for Chrysanthus in Entomologische Berichten. Van Helsdinger also wrote an obituary for Bulletin of the British Arachnological Society, which was reprinted in the newsletter for the American Arachnological Society. Chrysanthus's collection of New Guinea spiders was deposited in the Rijksmuseum van Natuurlijke Historie; his collection of spiders from South Limburg is now in the Maastricht Natural History Museum. His books were donated to the university library in Nijmegen.

In 1981, the Indian arachnologists B. K. Tikader and Animesh Bal named the species Neoscona chrysanthusi after him "in token of high regard which the present authors have for him." G. H. Locket named the species Nasoona chrysanthusi "in affectionate memory of the late Father Chrysanthus and in admiration of his work on New Guinea spiders" in 1982.
