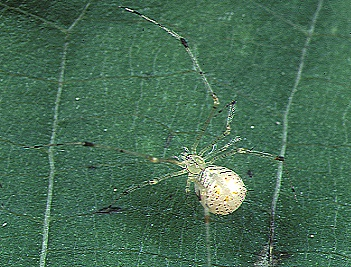
- Female

Scientific classification
- Kingdom: Animalia
- Phylum: Arthropoda
- Subphylum: Chelicerata
- Class: Arachnida
- Order: Araneae
- Infraorder: Araneomorphae
- Family: Theridiidae
- Genus: Meotipa
- Species: M. spiniventris

Binomial name
- Meotipa spiniventris (O. Pickard-Cambridge, 1869)

Synonyms
- Chrysso spiniventre; Theridion buitenzorgi; Theridion spiniventre

= Meotipa spiniventris =

Species of spider

Meotipa spiniventris is a species of spider of the genus Meotipa. It is found along Sri Lanka to Japan, and later introduced in to European countries, such as Netherlands.

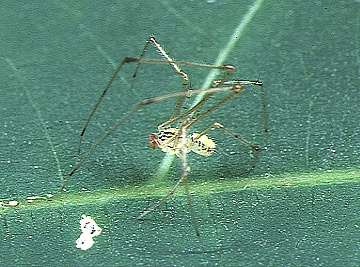
Male
