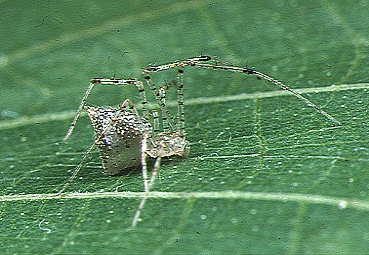
- Female
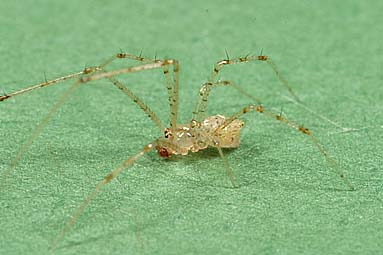
- Male

Scientific classification
- Kingdom: Animalia
- Phylum: Arthropoda
- Subphylum: Chelicerata
- Class: Arachnida
- Order: Araneae
- Infraorder: Araneomorphae
- Family: Theridiidae
- Genus: Meotipa
- Species: M. pulcherrima

Binomial name
- Meotipa pulcherrima (Mello-Leitão, 1917)

Synonyms
- Argyrodes pulcherrimus Mello-Leitão, 1917; Meotipa clementinae Petrunkevitch, 1930; Chrysso clementinae Levi, 1962; Chrysso pulcherrima Levi, 1967; Argyrodes elevatus Levi, 1967; Chrysso mussau Chrysanthus, 1975

= Meotipa pulcherrima =

Species of spider

Meotipa pulcherrima is a species of cobweb spider in the family Theridiidae. It is found in Tropical Africa, and has been introduced into the Americas, Papua New Guinea, China, Korea, Japan, and the Pacific Islands.

== Distribution ==
Meotipa pulcherrima is found in Japan, Korea, China, Taiwan, Indonesia (New Guinea), and the Pacific Islands. It has been introduced to the Americas and tropical Africa.

In South Africa, the species has been recorded from the provinces Eastern Cape and KwaZulu-Natal. Notable locations include Addo Elephant National Park and Oribi Gorge Nature Reserve.

== Habitat and ecology ==
Meotipa pulcherrima inhabits areas at altitudes from 416 to 496 m above sea level, where it has been sampled from the Savanna and Thicket biomes.

This species may be found in a tangled web associated with vegetation but is small and not easily seen.

== Description ==
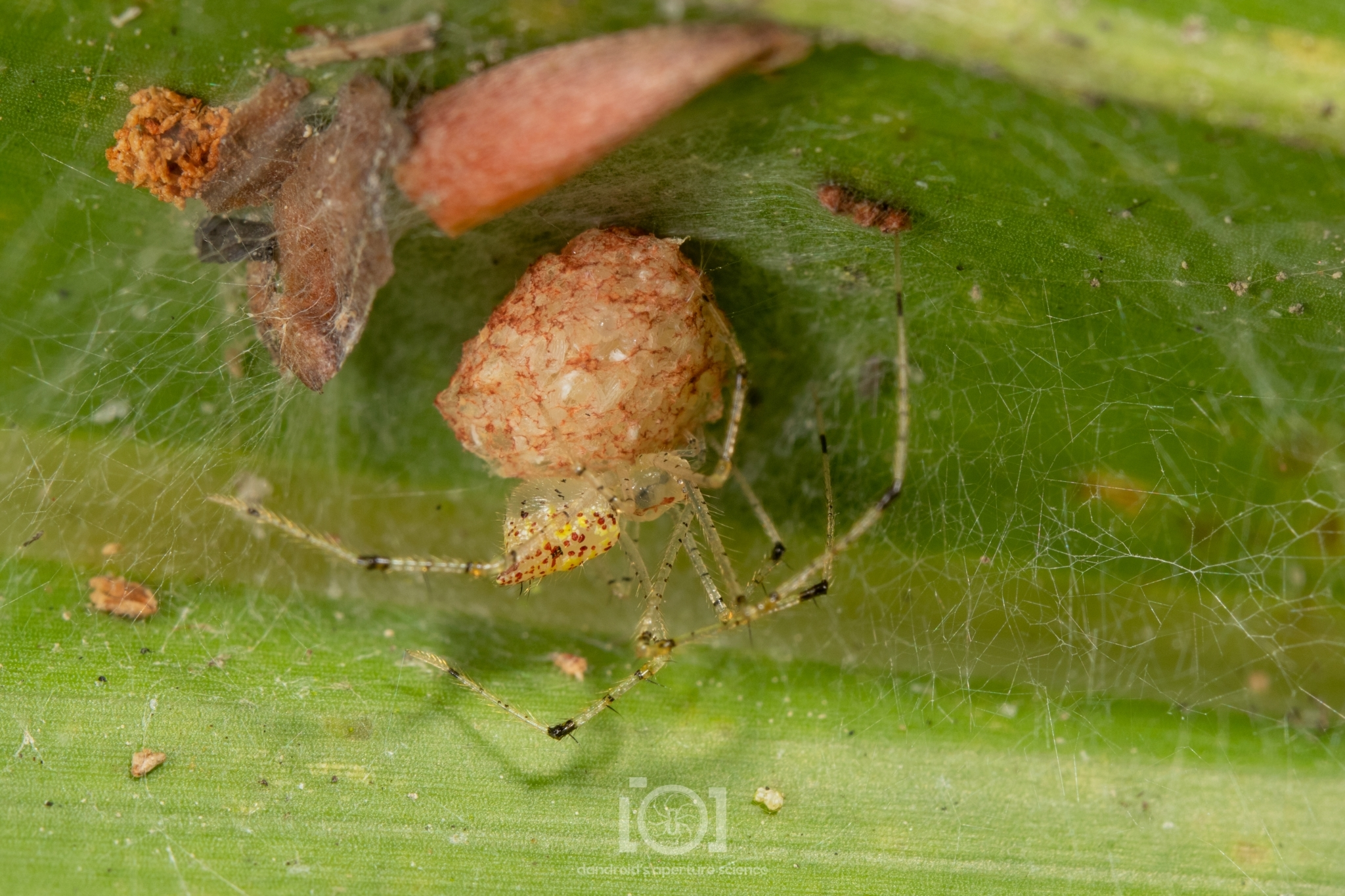
female with egg sac

== Conservation ==
Meotipa pulcherrima is listed as Least Concern by the South African National Biodiversity Institute due to its wide geographical range. The species is protected in Addo Elephant National Park and Oribi Gorge Nature Reserve.

== Taxonomy ==
The species was transferred to Meotipa from Chrysso by Yoshida in 2009.
