= Neoscona chrysanthusi =

Scientific classification
- Domain: Eukaryota
- Kingdom: Animalia
- Phylum: Arthropoda
- Subphylum: Chelicerata
- Class: Arachnida
- Order: Araneae
- Infraorder: Araneomorphae
- Family: Araneidae
- Genus: Neoscona
- Species: N. chrysanthusi

Binomial name
- Neoscona chrysanthusi Tikader & Bal, 1981

Species of orb-weaver spider

Neoscona chrysanthusi is a species of orb-weaver spider native to Bhutan, India and Pakistan. The specific epithet honors the Dutch arachnologist Father Chrysanthus "in token of high regard which the present authors have for him."
