= Nasoona chrysanthusi =

Scientific classification
- Domain: Eukaryota
- Kingdom: Animalia
- Phylum: Arthropoda
- Subphylum: Chelicerata
- Class: Arachnida
- Order: Araneae
- Infraorder: Araneomorphae
- Family: Linyphiidae
- Genus: Nasoona
- Species: N. chrysanthusi

Binomial name
- Nasoona chrysanthusi Locket, 1982

Species of dwarf spider

Nasoona chrysanthusi is a species of dwarf spider. It is named after Father Chrysanthus.
