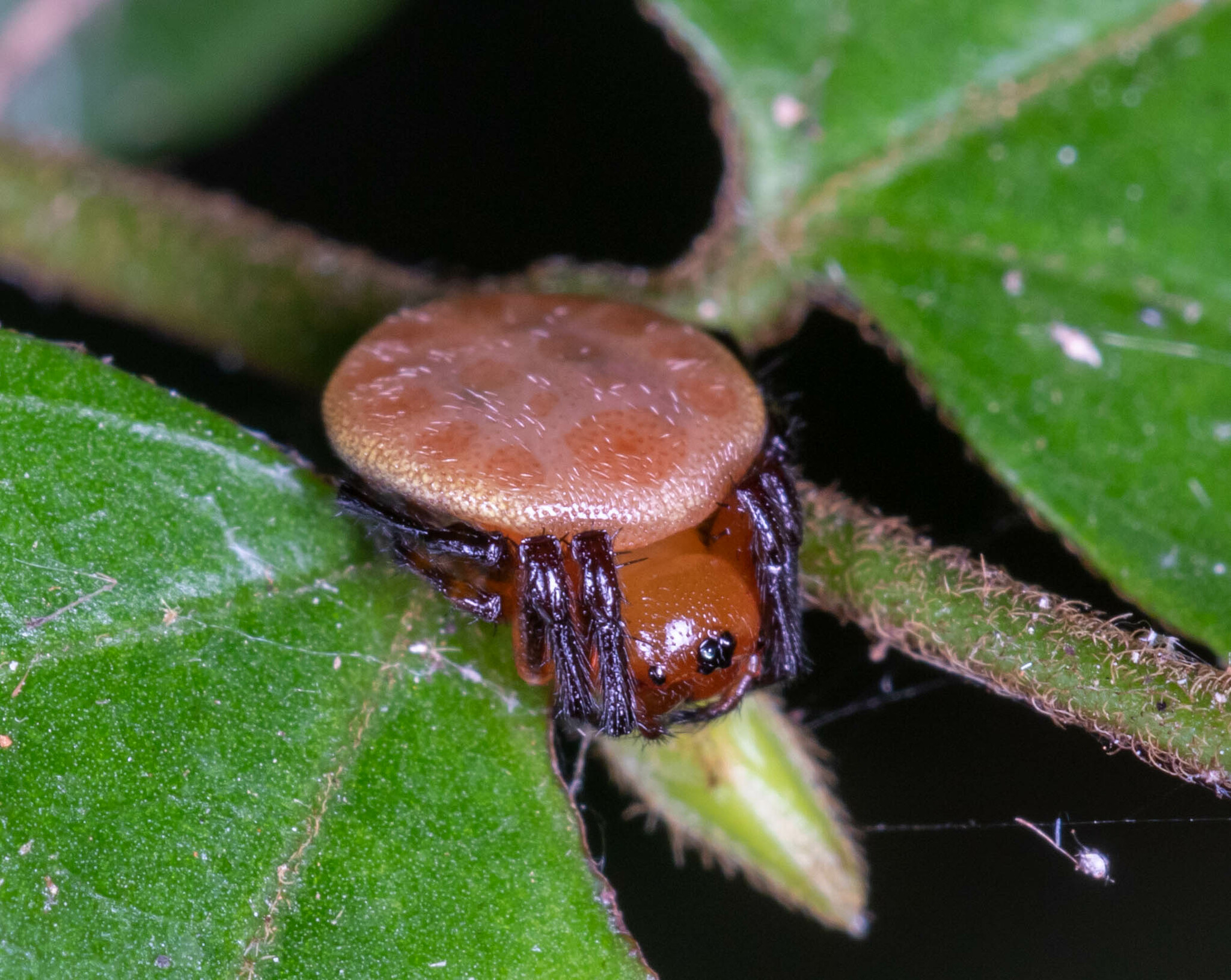
- female from Thailand

Scientific classification
- Kingdom: Animalia
- Phylum: Arthropoda
- Subphylum: Chelicerata
- Class: Arachnida
- Order: Araneae
- Infraorder: Araneomorphae
- Family: Araneidae
- Genus: Anepsion
- Species: A. depressum

Binomial name
- Anepsion depressum (Thorell, 1877)

Synonyms
- Paraplectana depressa Thorell, 1877; Anepsia depressa (Thorell, 1877)

= Anepsion depressum =

Species of spider

Anepsion depressum is a species of orb-weaver spider in the family Araneidae. It is found across Southeast Asia, from China through Myanmar to Indonesia.

== Etymology ==
The specific name depressum is Latin meaning "flattened" or "depressed", referring to the flattened appearance of the spider's abdomen.

== Distribution ==
A. depressum has been recorded from China, Myanmar, Thailand, and Indonesia (Sulawesi).

== Description ==
Anepsion depressum is a medium-sized orb-weaver spider with distinctive coloration and markings.

The cephalothorax is yellowish-brown in color, while the sternum, labium, and leg segments are dark brown. The abdomen displays a striking yellow coloration with a broad dark brown marking extending from the front to the rear, surrounded by dark brown spinnerets and decorated with black patterns along the sides.

Females are larger than males, with body lengths ranging from 3.07 to 4.33 mm compared to males at 3.30 mm. The carapace is longer than wide in both sexes, and the abdomen is nearly as long as it is wide.

The species can be easily distinguished from the closely related Anepsion japonicum by its unmarked yellowish abdomen, whereas A. japonicum has distinct markings on the abdomen.
