= Meotipa vesiculosa =

Scientific classification
- Domain: Eukaryota
- Kingdom: Animalia
- Phylum: Arthropoda
- Subphylum: Chelicerata
- Class: Arachnida
- Order: Araneae
- Infraorder: Araneomorphae
- Family: Theridiidae
- Genus: Meotipa
- Species: M. vesiculosa

Binomial name
- Meotipa vesiculosa Simon, 1895

Synonyms
- Chrysso vesiculosa (Simon, 1894)

Species of spider

Meotipa vesiculosa is a species of cobweb spider in the family Theridiidae. It is found in Japan, China, Taiwan, Vietnam, Philippines, and Indonesia. It was described by Eugène Simon in 1895.

Meotipa vesiculosa has formerly been placed in the genus Chrysso.
