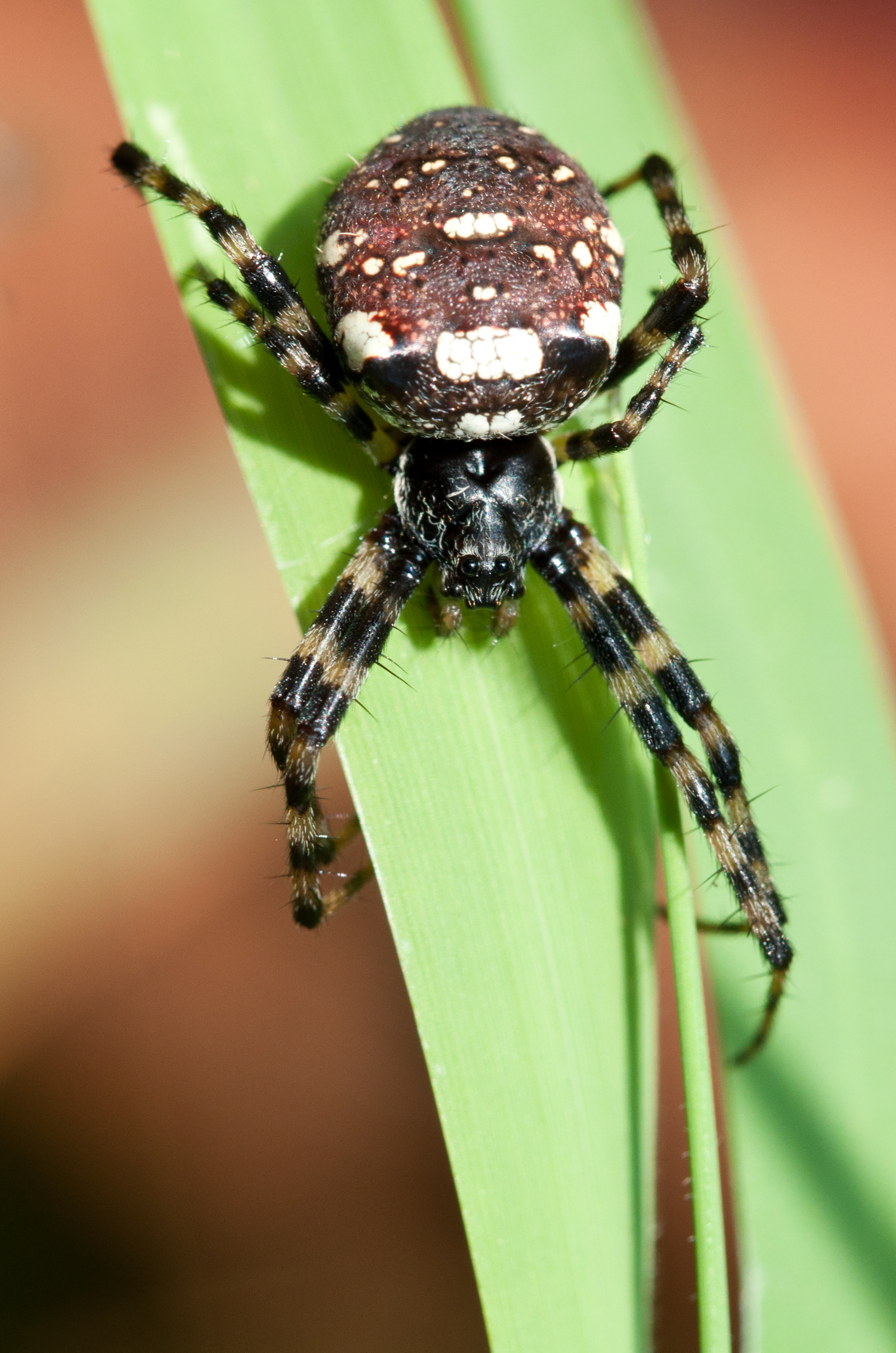
- female Gea spinipes Khao Yai National Park, Thailand
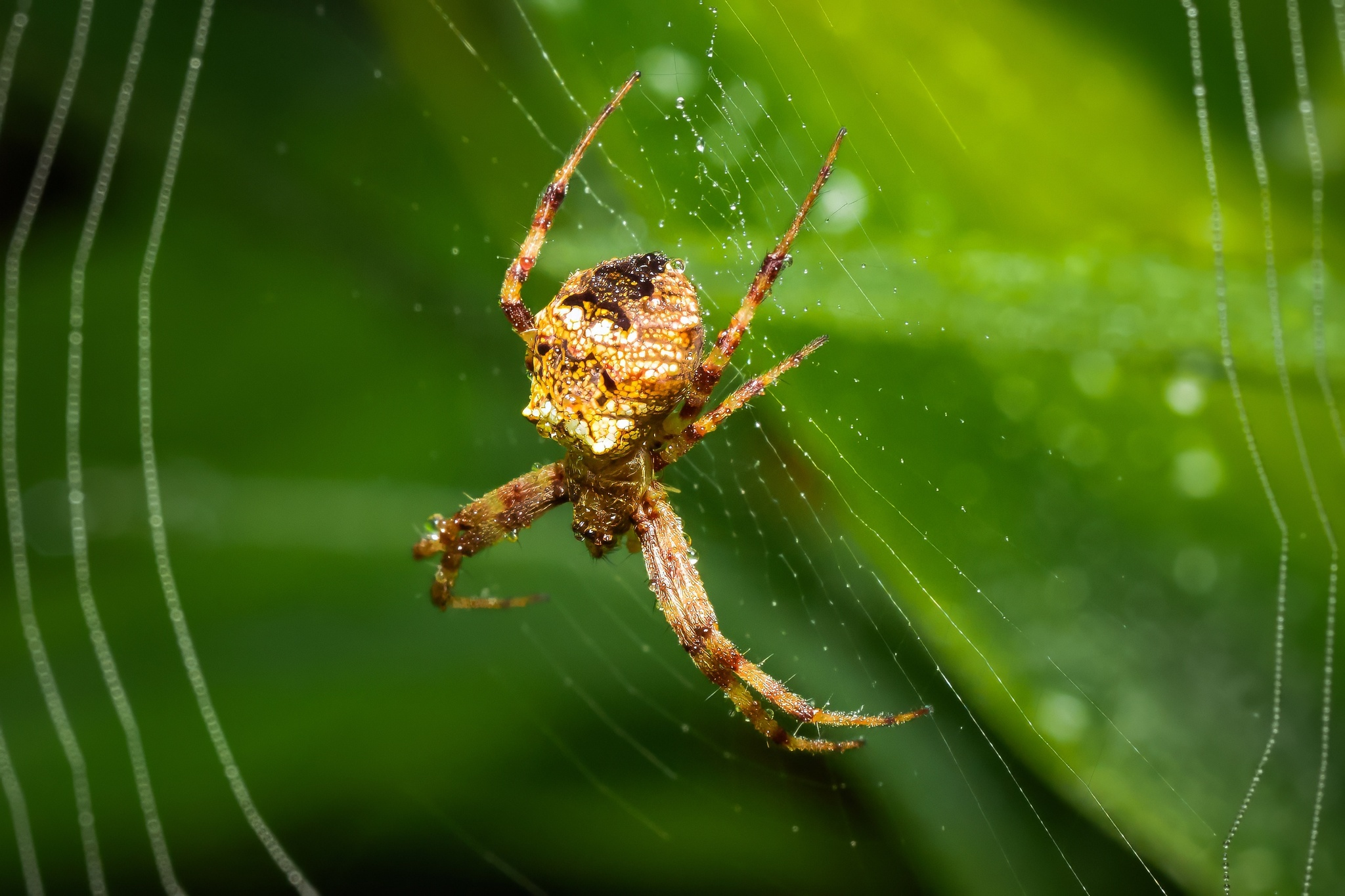
- female Gea heptagon, USA

Scientific classification
- Kingdom: Animalia
- Phylum: Arthropoda
- Subphylum: Chelicerata
- Class: Arachnida
- Order: Araneae
- Infraorder: Araneomorphae
- Family: Araneidae
- Genus: Gea; C. L. Koch, 1843

Type species
- G. spinipes C. L. Koch, 1843

Species
- 13, see text

= Gea (spider) =

Gea Temporal range: Neogene–present

Genus of spiders

Gea is a genus of orb-weaver spiders first described by C. L. Koch in 1843.

== Distribution ==
Spiders of genus Gea are found from India to Australia, with four species in Africa. G. heptagon was introduced to North and South America.

== Description ==
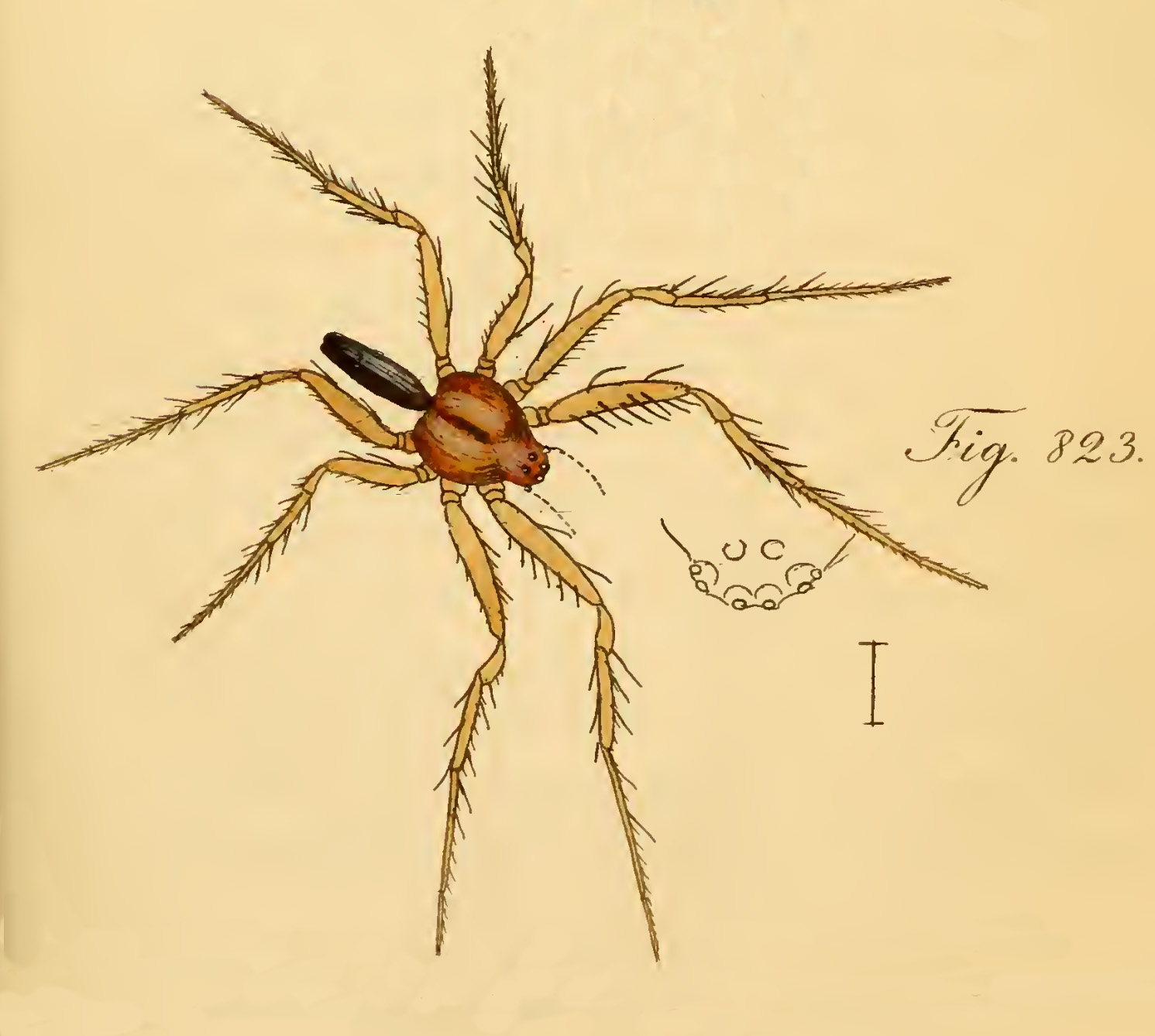
Gea spinipes, original 1843 drawing

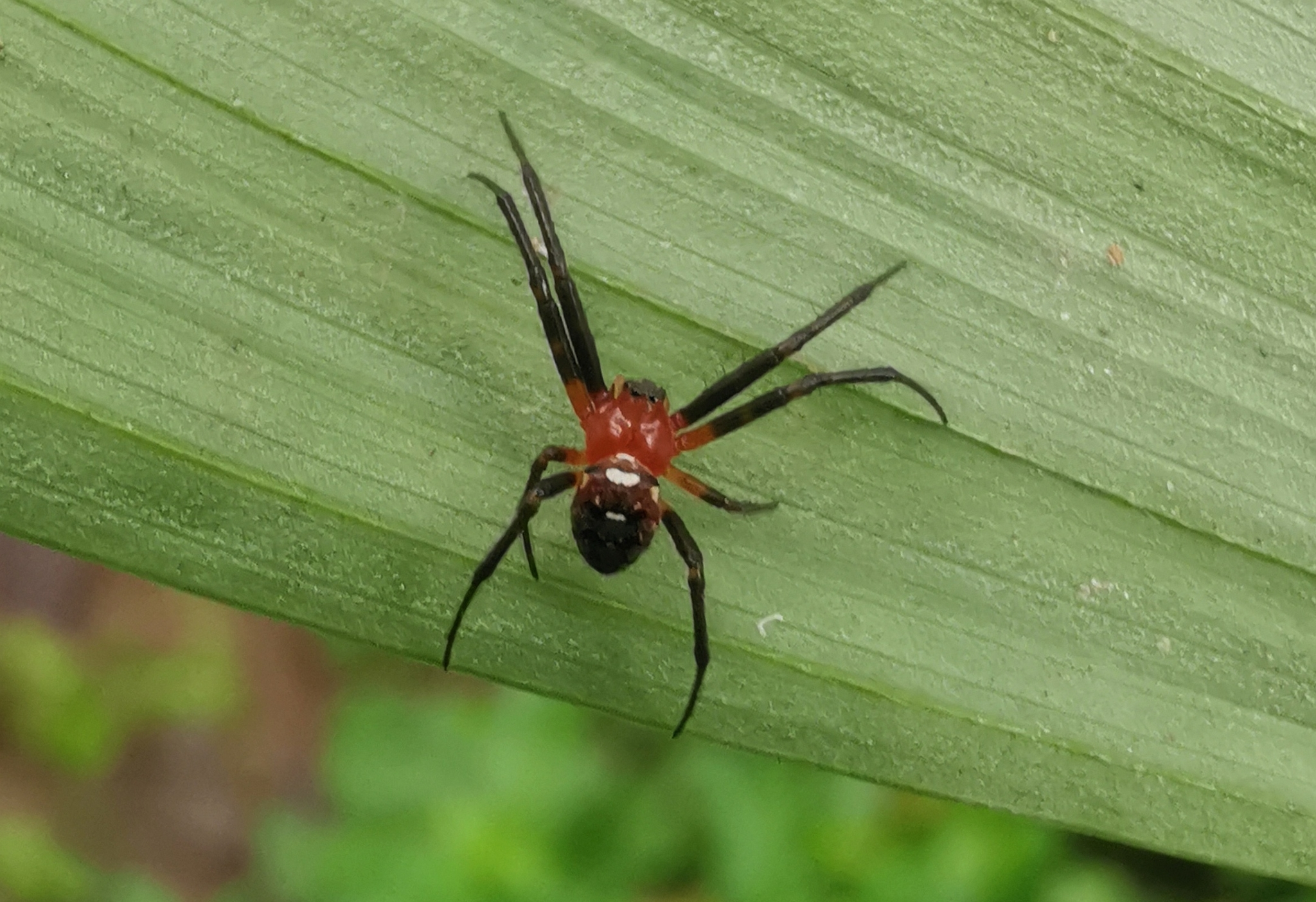
male Gea spinipes

The total length of spiders in this genus ranges from 4-6 mm in females and 3-4.5 mm in males.

Gea differs from Argiope in having evenly spaced anterior eyes, and it differs from most araneid genera by having a strongly procurved posterior eye row and a low thoracic region of the carapace.

Gea specimens are smaller than Argiope and possess larger posterior median eyes. In females, the eyes of the posterior eye row are almost equally spaced, whereas in Argiope, the median eyes are positioned closer to each other than to the lateral eyes.

The abdomen is shield-shaped with lobes on the sides, and the coloration of the abdomen is variable, potentially featuring transverse lines or a dark folium. Another distinguishing character that separates Gea from other genera is the modified first tibia of the male, which is curved and armed with macro-setae.

== Ecology and behavior ==
According to Simon (1895), they do not make a stabilimentum, but it has been observed in the webs of some species.

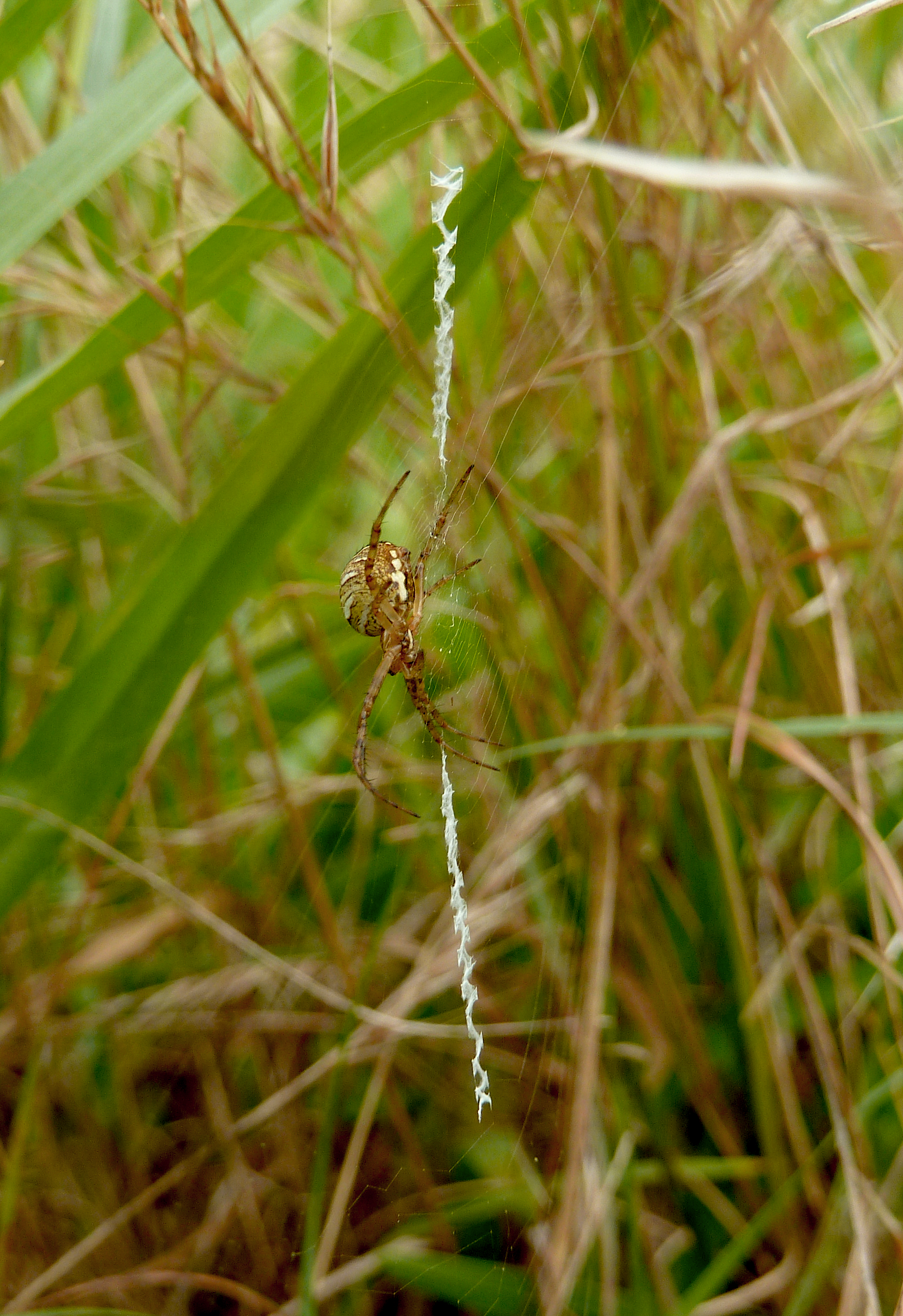
Gea theridioides, adult female with stabilimentum (Royal Park, Melbourne/VIC, Australia; © André Walter).

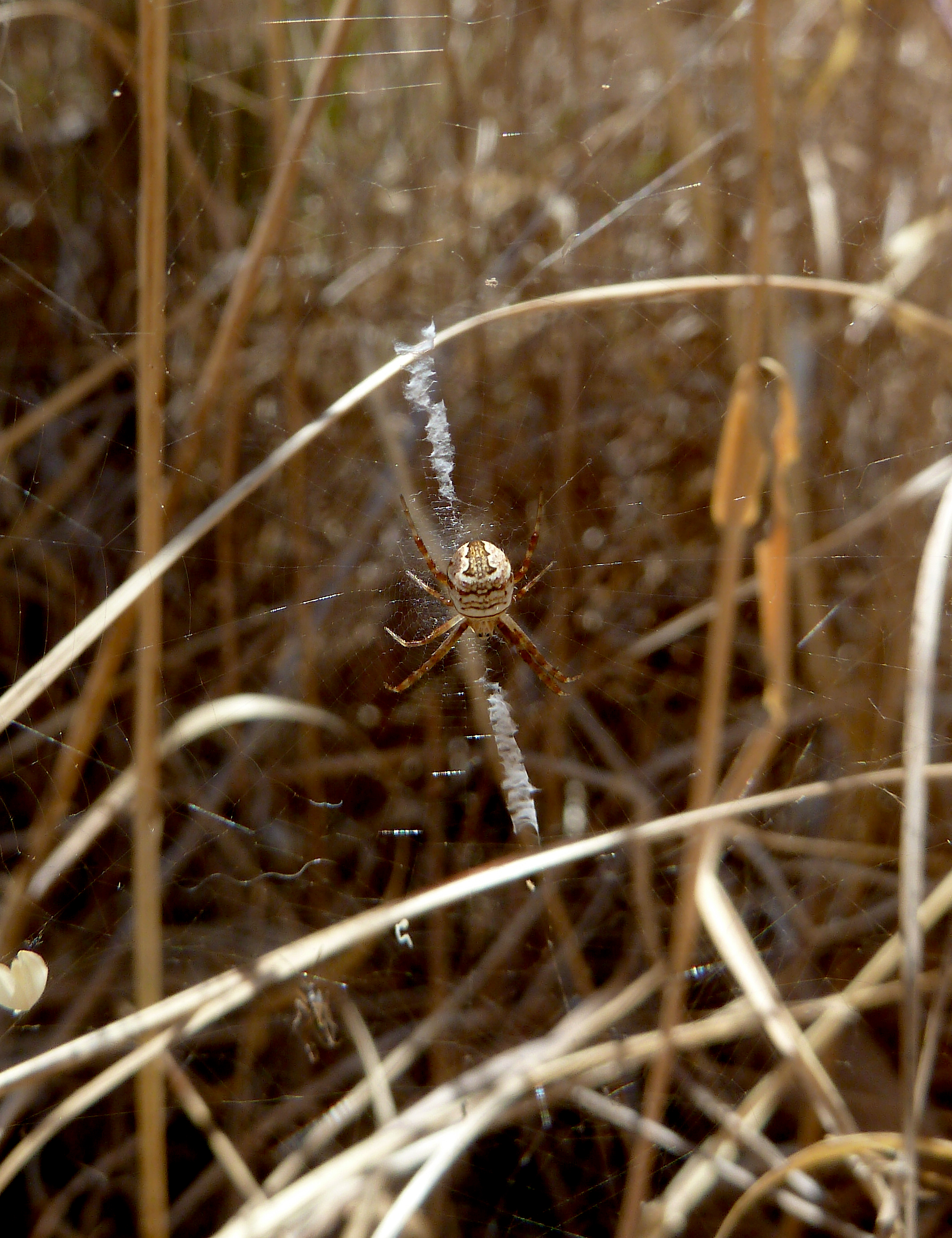
Gea theridioides, adult female with stabilimentum (Euroa/VIC, Australia; © André Walter).

== Species ==
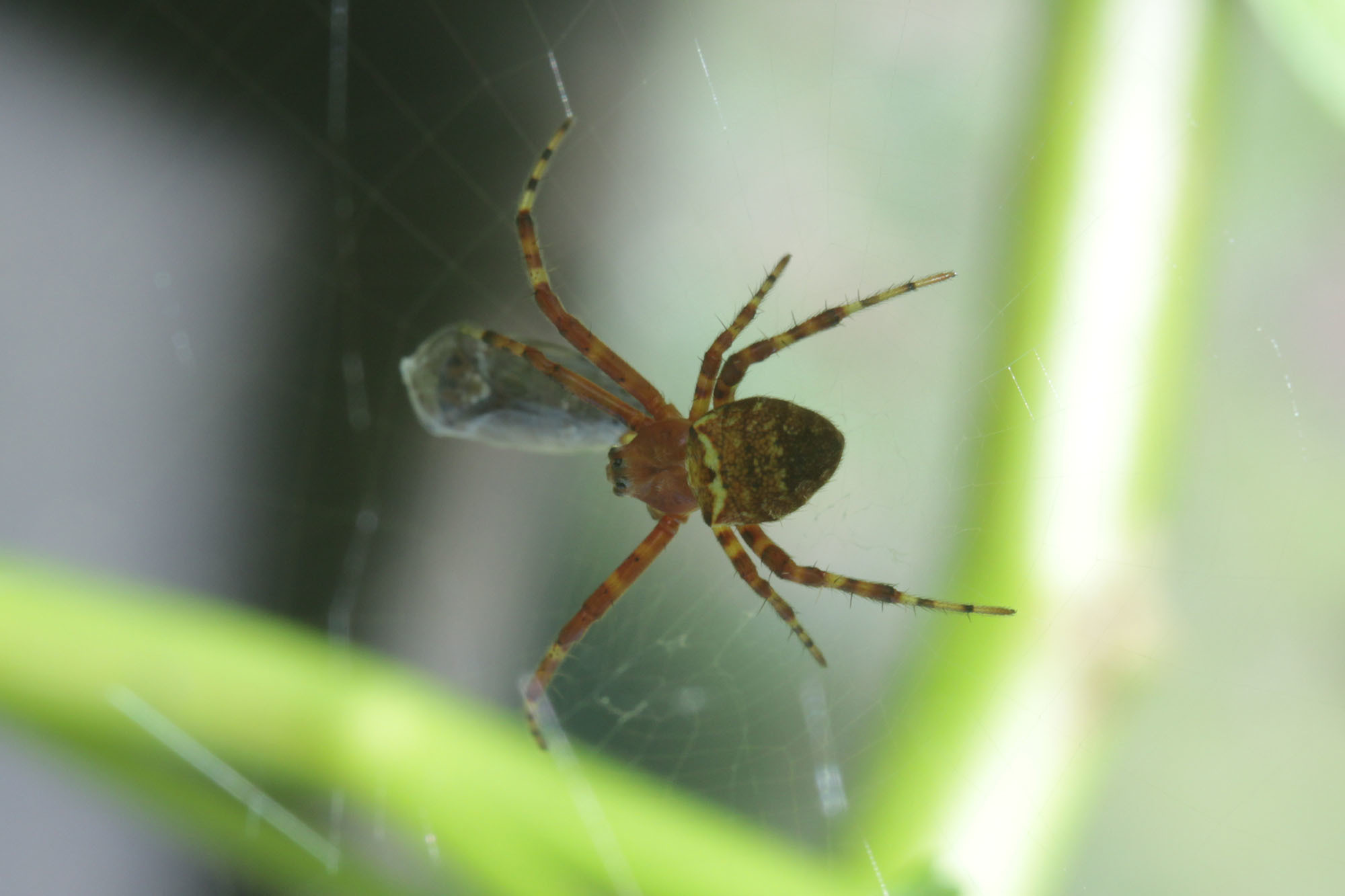
G. bituberculata

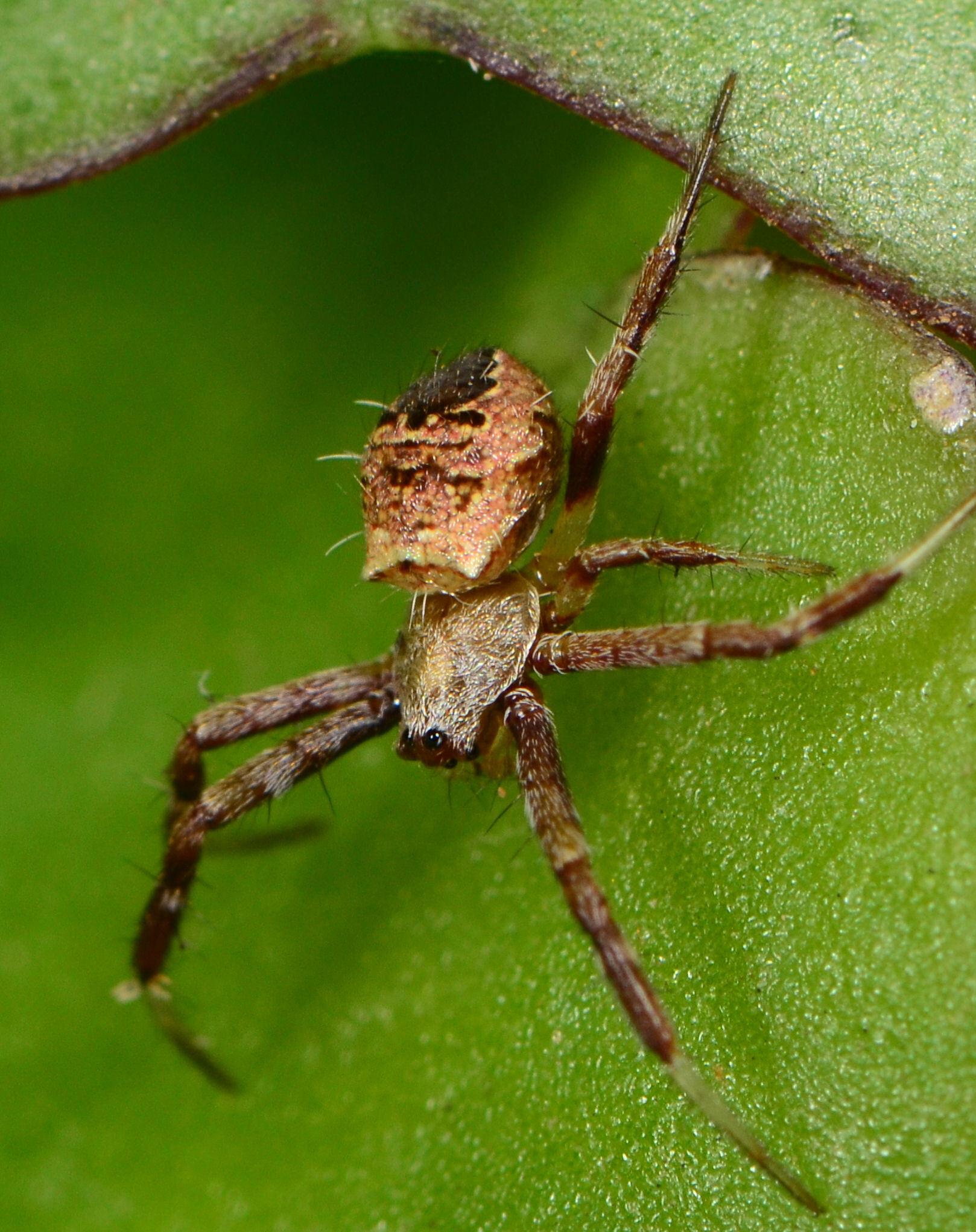
female G. infuscata

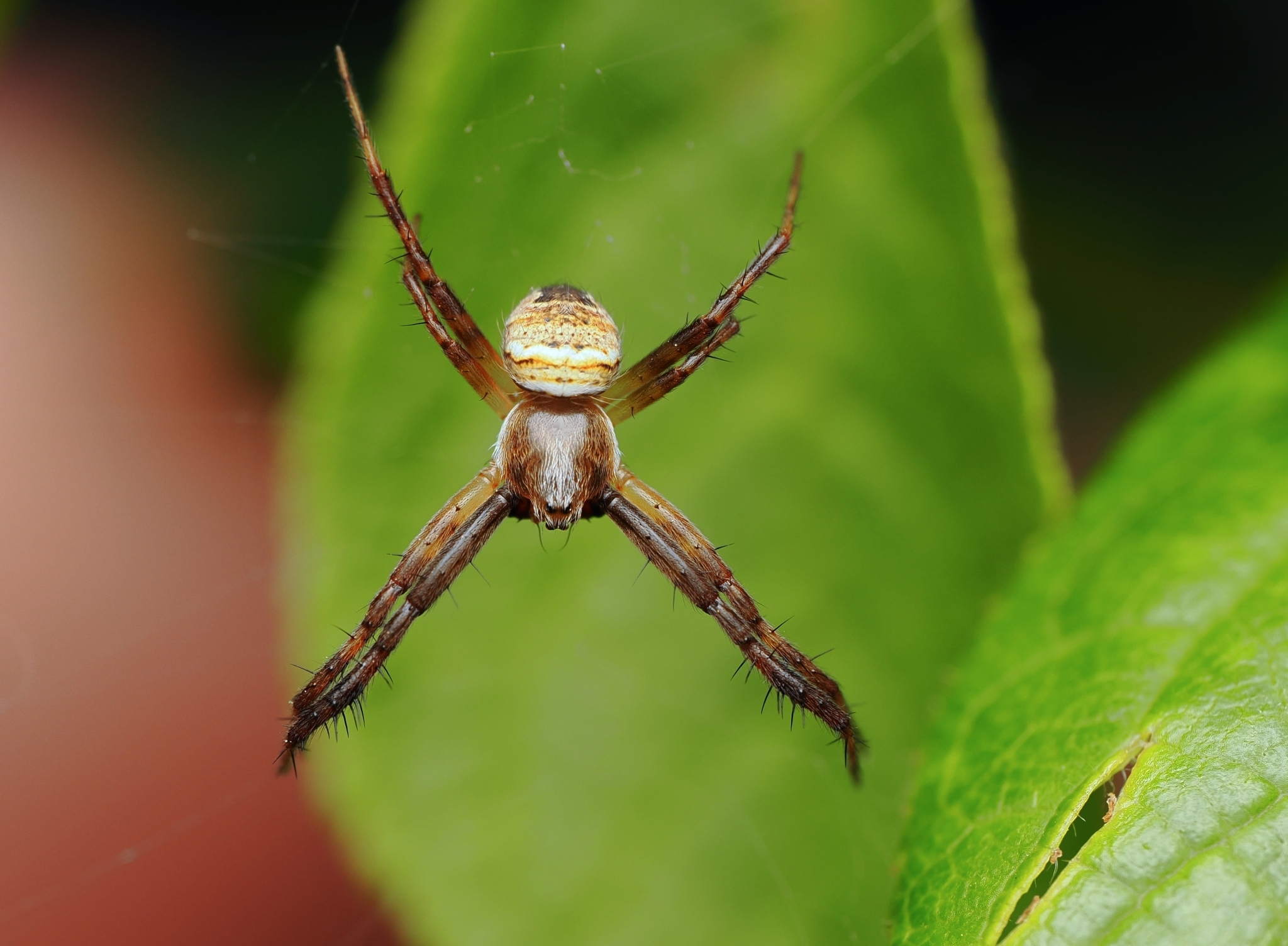
female G. theridioides

As of November 2026, this genus includes thirteen species:

- Gea africana Simon, 1895 – DR Congo
- Gea argiopides Strand, 1911 – Aru Islands, Papua New Guinea
- Gea bituberculata (Thorell, 1881) – New Guinea
- Gea eff Levi, 1983 – Papua New Guinea
- Gea heptagon (Hentz, 1850) – Pacific Islands, Australia. Introduced to United States, Argentina
- Gea infuscata Tullgren, 1910 – Sudan, Tanzania, Angola, Botswana, South Africa
- Gea jingdong Mi, Wang & Gan, 2024 – China
- Gea nilotica Simon, 1906 – Sudan
- Gea spinipes C. L. Koch, 1843 – Pakistan, India, Myanmar, China, Taiwan, Vietnam, Malaysia, Singapore, Sumatra, Borneo (type species)
- Gea subarmata Thorell, 1890 – India, Bangladesh, Myanmar, China, Ryukyu Islands, Philippines, Singapore, Borneo, Sumatra, Java, New Guinea
- Gea theridioides (L. Koch, 1872) – Queensland, New South Wales
- Gea transversovittata Tullgren, 1910 – Congo, Tanzania
- Gea zaragosa Barrion & Litsinger, 1995 – India, Philippines
