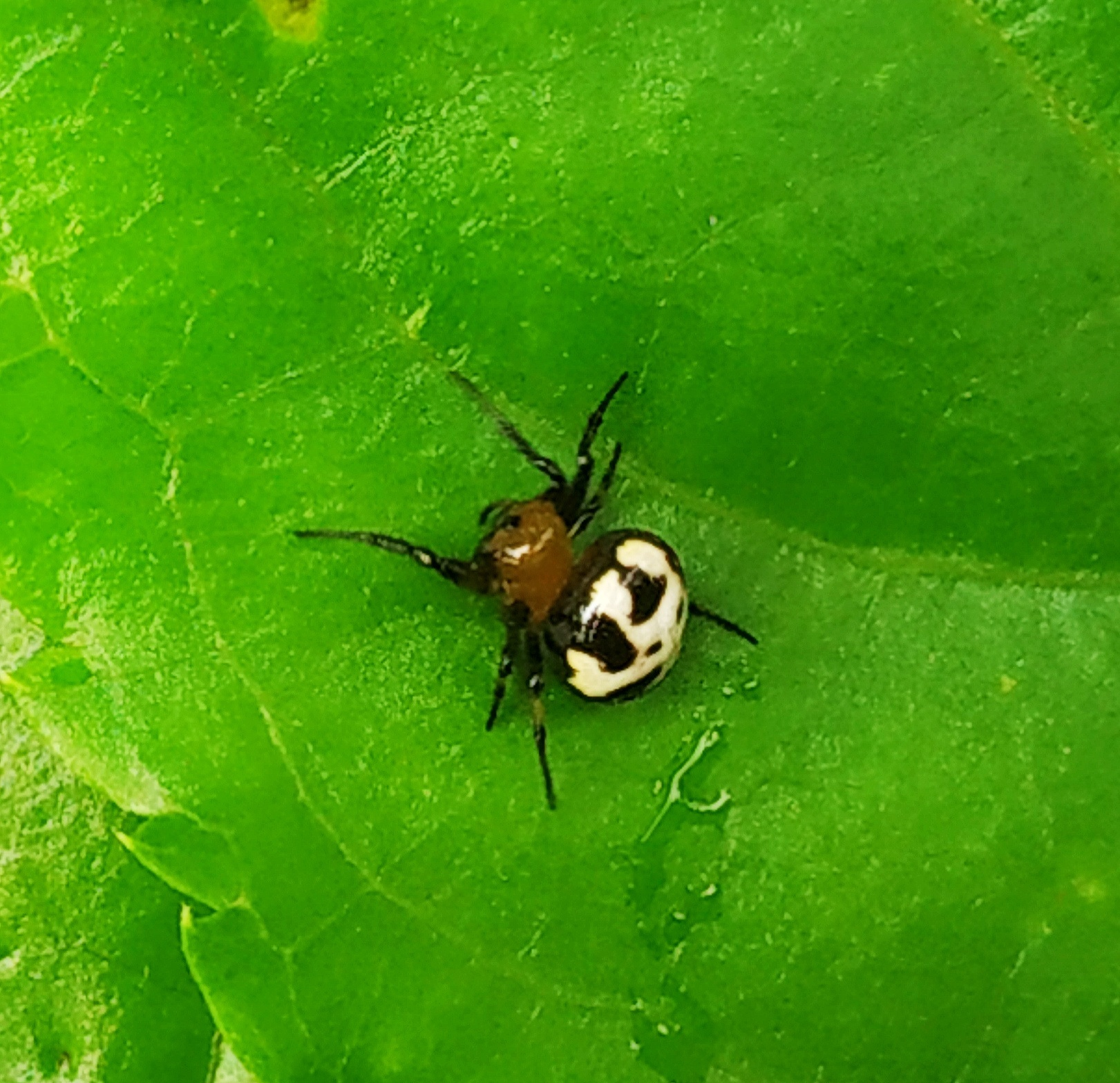

Scientific classification
- Kingdom: Animalia
- Phylum: Arthropoda
- Subphylum: Chelicerata
- Class: Arachnida
- Order: Araneae
- Infraorder: Araneomorphae
- Family: Araneidae
- Genus: Anepsion
- Species: A. maritatum

Binomial name
- Anepsion maritatum (O. Pickard-Cambridge, 1877)

Synonyms
- Anepsion keralensis (Jose, 2011); Cyrtarachne keralensis Jose, 2011

= Anepsion maritatum =

Species of spider

Anepsion maritatum is a species of spider of the genus Anepsion. It is found in India, Sri Lanka, China to Sulawesi.
