= Nasoona =

Scientific classification
- Kingdom: Animalia
- Phylum: Arthropoda
- Subphylum: Chelicerata
- Class: Arachnida
- Order: Araneae
- Infraorder: Araneomorphae
- Family: Linyphiidae
- Genus: Nasoona; Locket, 1982

Type species
- N. prominula Locket, 1982

Species
- 17, see text

Synonyms
- Chaetophyma Millidge, 1991; Gorbothorax Tanasevitch, 1998

Genus of spiders

Nasoona is a genus of dwarf spiders that was first described by G. H. Locket in 1982.

== Species ==
As of May 2019 it contains seventeen species:

- Nasoona asocialis (Wunderlich, 1974) – China, Nepal, India, Myanmar, Laos, Thailand, Malaysia (mainland), Indonesia (Bali, Java)
- Nasoona chrysanthusi Locket, 1982 – Malaysia, Singapore, Indonesia (Sumatra)
- Nasoona comata (Tanasevitch, 1998) – Nepal
- Nasoona conica (Tanasevitch, 1998) – Nepal
- Nasoona coronata (Simon, 1894) – Venezuela
- Nasoona crucifera (Thorell, 1895) – India, China, Taiwan, Hong Kong, Myanmar, Laos, Vietnam, Thailand, Singapore, Malaysia (mainland, Borneo), Indonesia (Borneo)
- Nasoona indianа Tanasevitch, 2018 – India
- Nasoona intuberosa Tanasevitch, 2018 – Malaysia (Borneo)
- Nasoona kinabalu Tanasevitch, 2018 – Malaysia (Borneo)
- Nasoona locketi Millidge, 1995 – Indonesia (Krakatoa)
- Nasoona orissa Tanasevitch, 2018 – India
- Nasoona prominula Locket, 1982 (type) – Taiwan, Thailand, Laos, Malaysia (mainland), Singapore
- Nasoona sabah Tanasevitch, 2018 – Malaysia (Borneo)
- Nasoona setifera (Tanasevitch, 1998) – Nepal
- Nasoona silvestris Millidge, 1995 – Indonesia
- Nasoona sulawesi Tanasevitch, 2018 – Indonesia (Sulawesi)
- Nasoona wunderlichi (Brignoli, 1983) – Nepal
