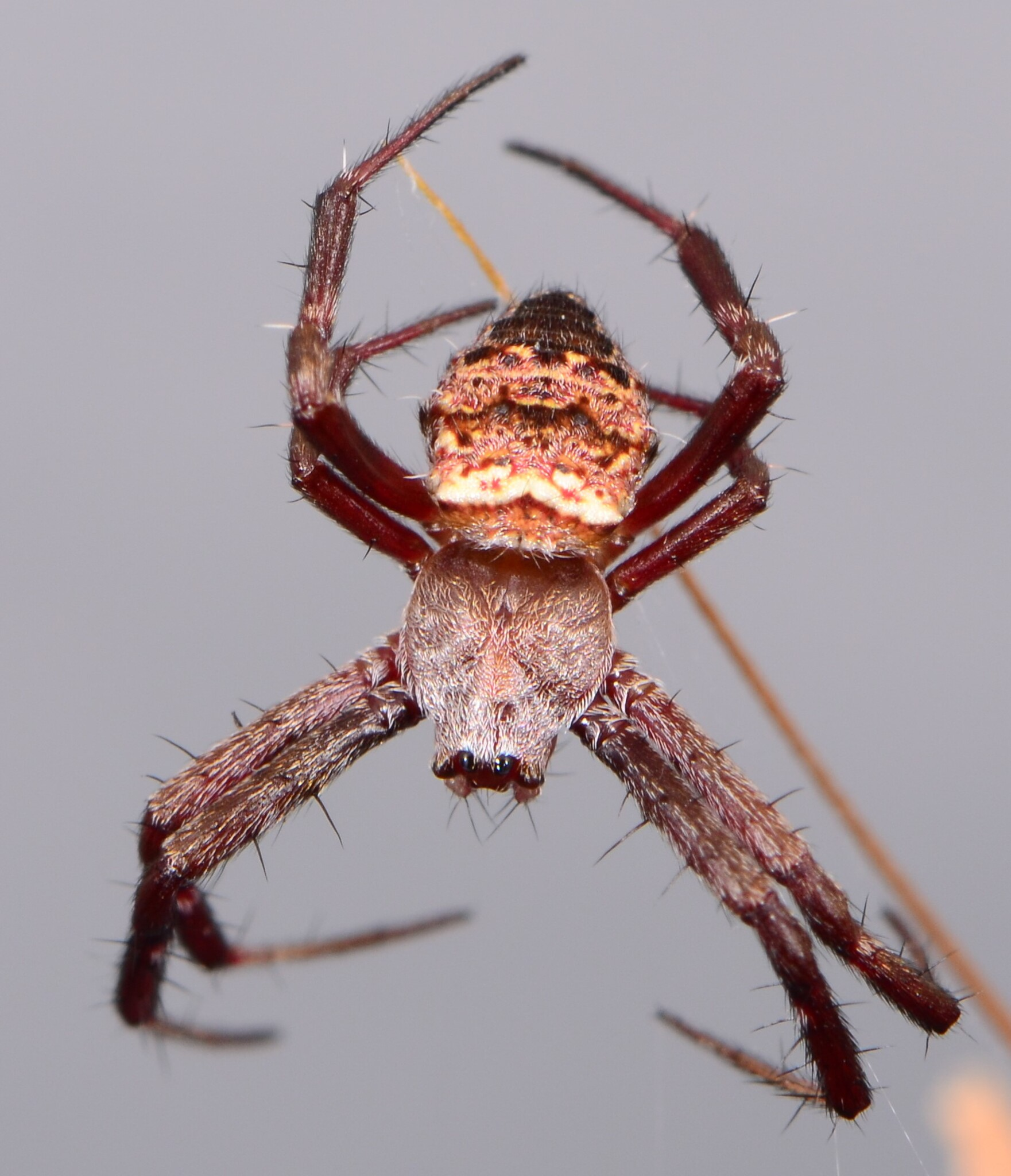
- female
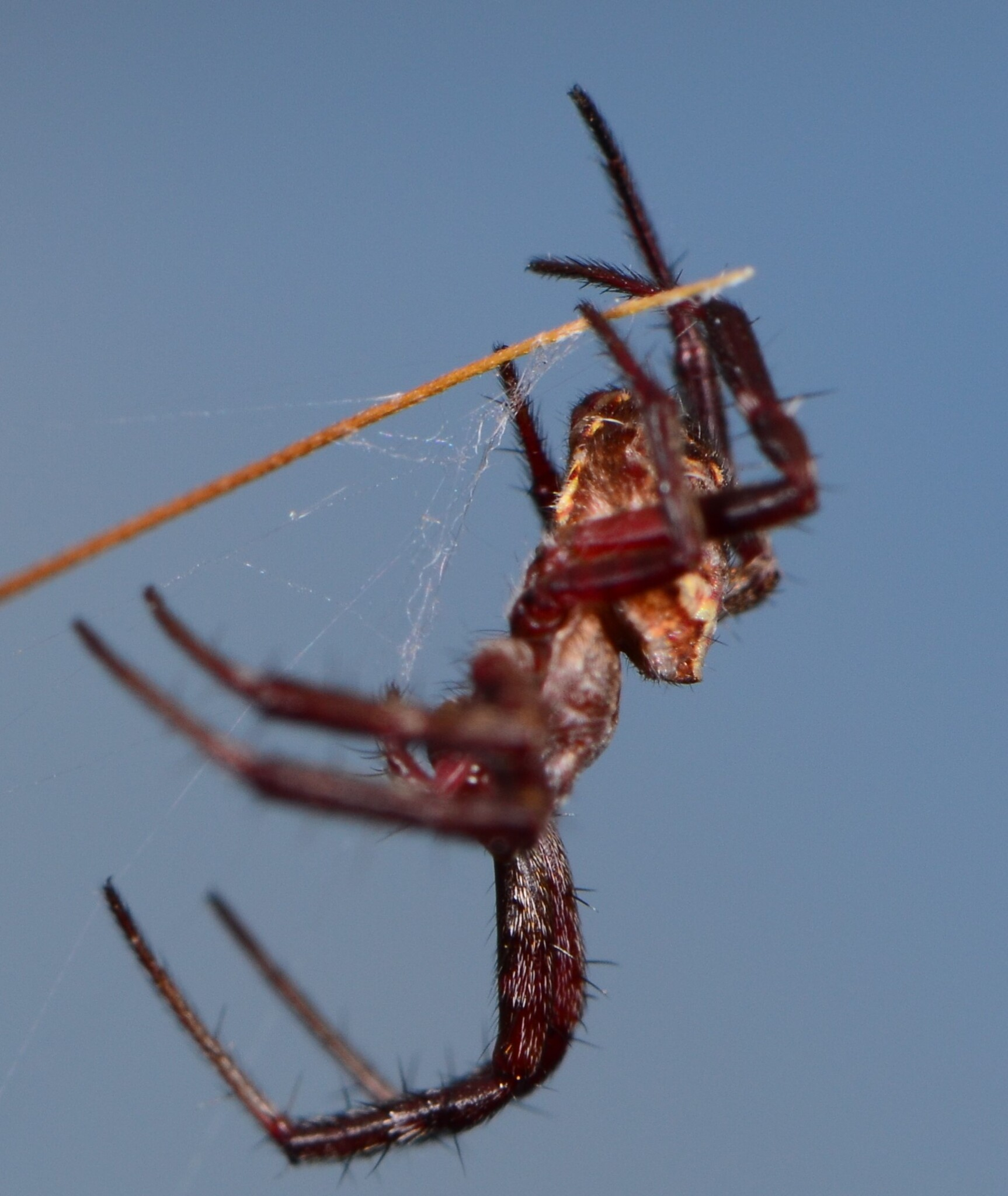
- female

Scientific classification
- Kingdom: Animalia
- Phylum: Arthropoda
- Subphylum: Chelicerata
- Class: Arachnida
- Order: Araneae
- Infraorder: Araneomorphae
- Family: Araneidae
- Genus: Gea
- Species: G. infuscata

Binomial name
- Gea infuscata Tullgren, 1910

= Gea infuscata =

Species of spider

Gea infuscata is a species of spider in the family Araneidae, found from Sudan to South Africa.

== Distribution ==
Gea infuscata is known from Tanzania, Angola, Botswana, Sudan and South Africa. The species is possibly under-collected and is suspected to occur in more countries in between.

The South African distribution includes Eastern Cape, KwaZulu-Natal, Limpopo, Mpumalanga, and Western Cape provinces. Notable localities include Jeffrey's Bay, Addo Elephant National Park, Ndumo Game Reserve, iSimangaliso Wetland park, Tembe Elephant Park, Polokwane Nature Reserve, and Knysna.

== Habitat and ecology ==
Gea infuscata constructs an orb-web with a round zigzag stabilimentum, giving it a doily appearance.

The species has been sampled from the Fynbos, Forest and Savanna biomes at altitudes from 1 to 1,323 m above sea level.

== Description ==
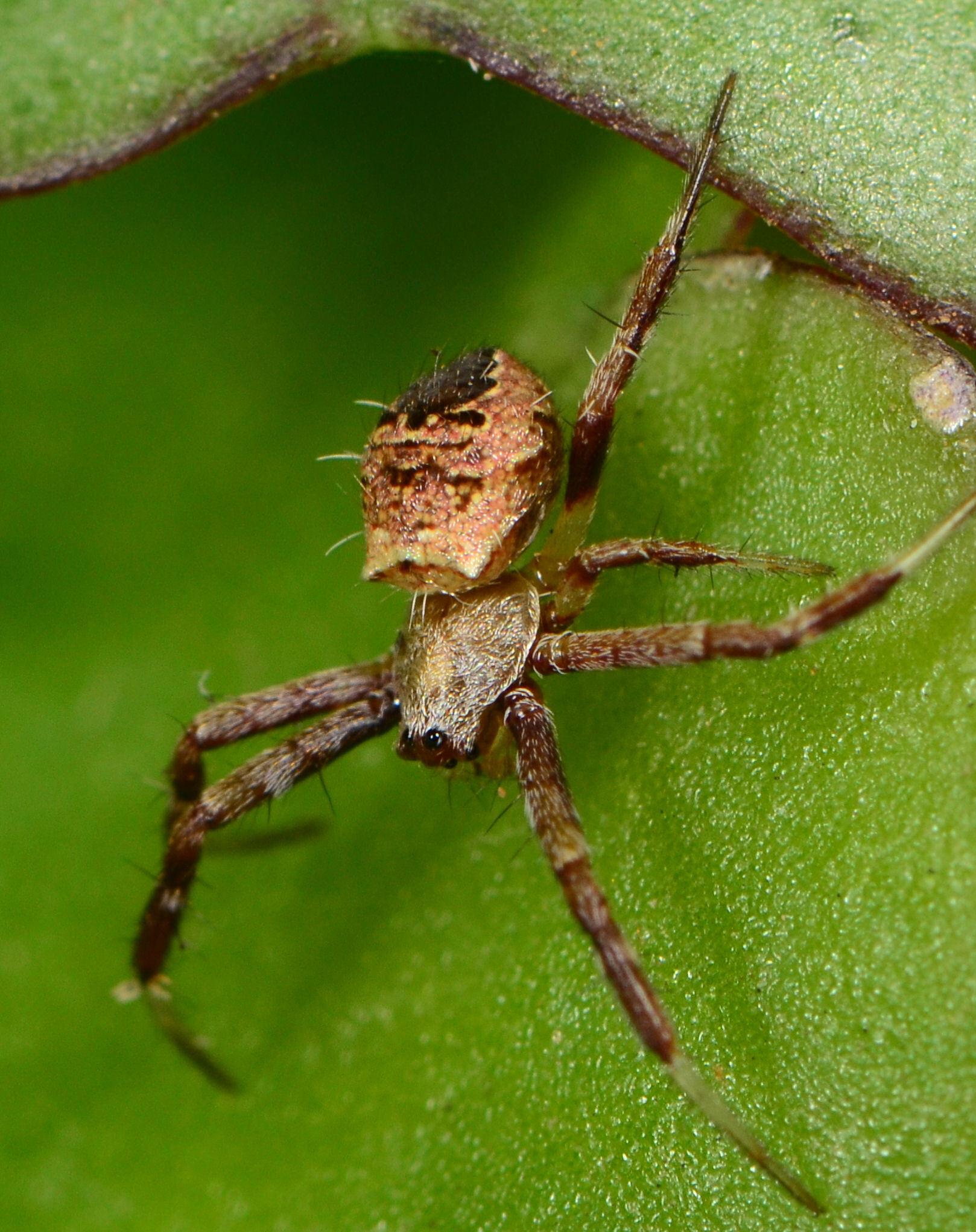
female

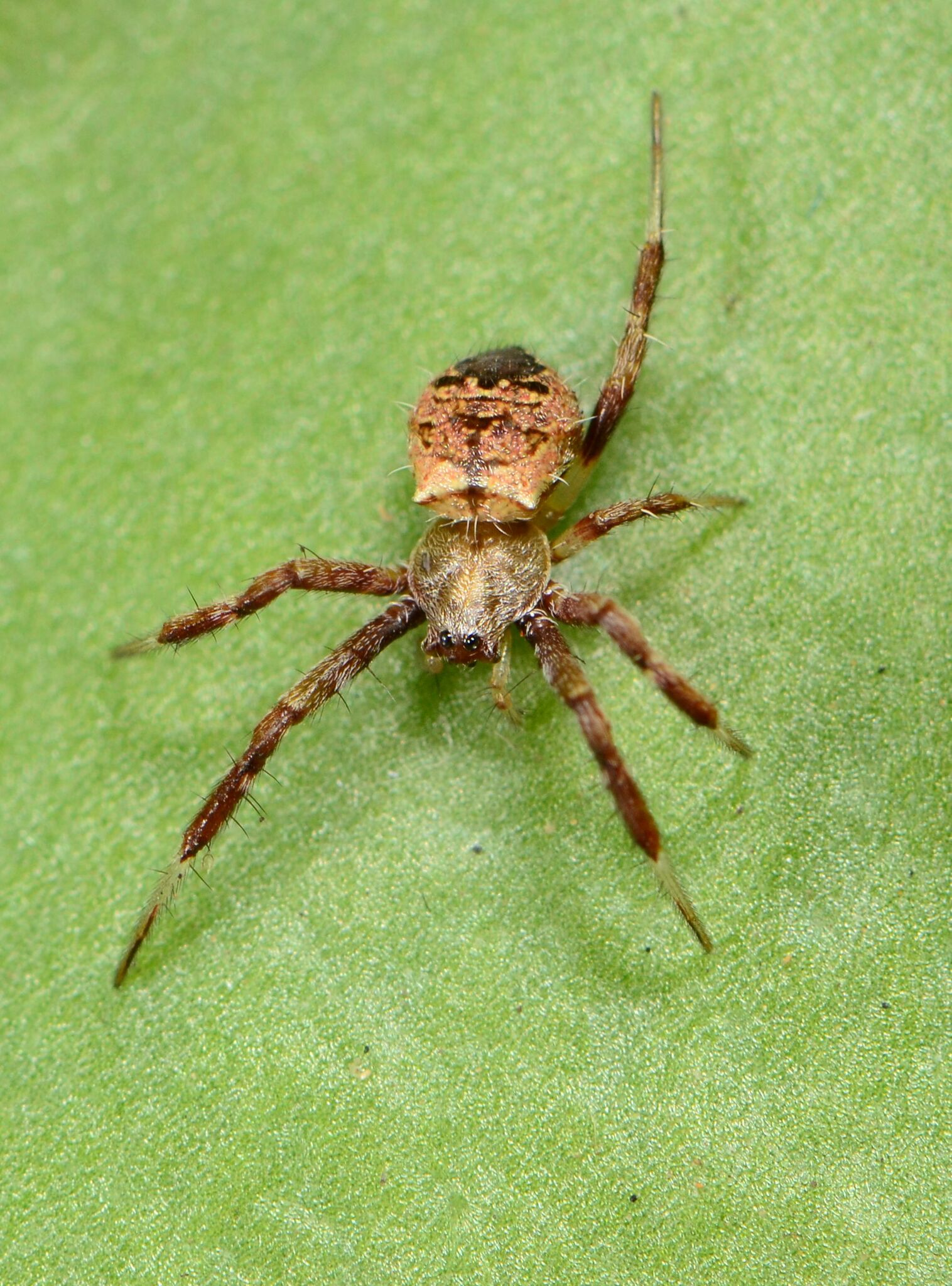
female

== Conservation ==
Gea infuscata is listed as Least Concern by the South African National Biodiversity Institute due to its wide geographical distribution. The species is protected in several reserves including Addo Elephant National Park, Mkhambathi Nature Reserve, Ndumo Game Reserve, Tembe Elephant Park and Polokwane Nature Reserve. No conservation actions are recommended.

== Taxonomy ==
The species has not been revised and is known from both sexes.
