= Meotipa sahyadri =

Scientific classification
- Kingdom: Animalia
- Phylum: Arthropoda
- Subphylum: Chelicerata
- Class: Arachnida
- Order: Araneae
- Infraorder: Araneomorphae
- Family: Theridiidae
- Genus: Meotipa
- Species: M. sahyadri

Binomial name
- Meotipa sahyadri (Kulkarni, Siddharth & Vartak, 2017 )

Species of spider

Meotipa sahyadri is a spider species of the genus Meotipa that is mainly indigenous to the Western Ghats in India.

Meotipa sahyadri, named after the Sanskrit name for the Western Ghats i.e., Sahyadri.
