= Mesida culta =

Scientific classification
- Kingdom: Animalia
- Phylum: Arthropoda
- Subphylum: Chelicerata
- Class: Arachnida
- Order: Araneae
- Infraorder: Araneomorphae
- Family: Tetragnathidae
- Genus: Mesida
- Species: M. culta

Binomial name
- Mesida culta (O. Pickard-Cambridge, 1869)

Synonyms
- Tetragnatha culta O. Pickard-Cambridge, 1869; Leucauge sexpustulata Simon, 1906; Leucauge culta (O. Pickard-Cambridge, 1869); Anopas cultus (O. Pickard-Cambridge, 1869)

Species of spider

Mesida culta, is a species of spider of the genus Mesida. It is native to India and Sri Lanka.
