= Tijdschrift voor Entomologie =

- Discipline: Entomology
- Language: English
- Edited by: Hendrik Freitag

Publication details
- History: 1857–2025
- Publisher: Brill Publishers
- Frequency: Triannually
- Open access: Hybrid

Standard abbreviations
- ISO 4: Tijdschr. Entomol.

Indexing
- ISSN: 2211-9434 (print); 0040-7496 (web)
- LCCN: 2020205020
- OCLC no.: 636770272

Links
- Journal homepage; Online archive

The Tijdschrift voor Entomologie (English: Journal of Entomology) was a triannual peer-reviewed scientific journal covering systematic and evolutionary entomology. It was published by Brill Publishers on behalf of the Netherlands Entomological Society, and the editor-in-chief is Hendrik Freitag (Ateneo de Manila University. Originally published in Dutch, the journal was later published in English only. In 2025, the board of the Netherlands Entomological Society decided to discontinue the journal.

== Abstracting and indexing ==
The journal is abstracted and indexed in:

- Aquatic Sciences and Fisheries Abstracts
- Biological Abstracts
- BIOSIS Previews
- CAB Abstracts
- EBSCO databases
- Scopus
- The Zoological Record
