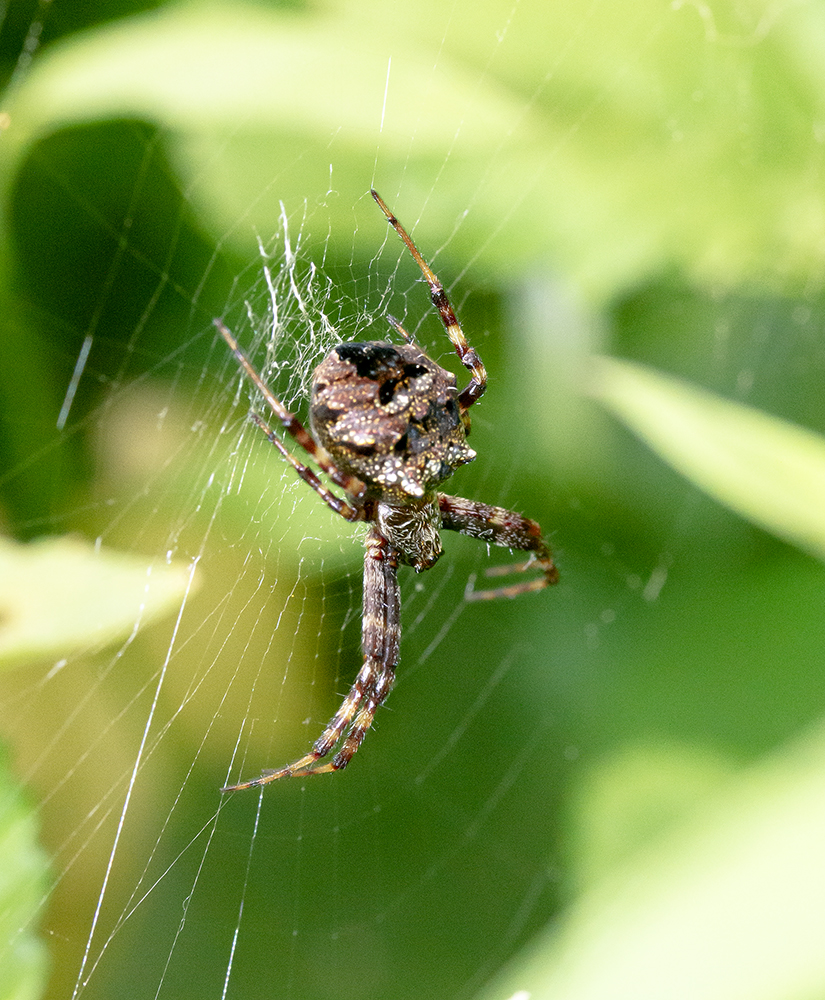
- Gea heptagon

Scientific classification
- Domain: Eukaryota
- Kingdom: Animalia
- Phylum: Arthropoda
- Subphylum: Chelicerata
- Class: Arachnida
- Order: Araneae
- Infraorder: Araneomorphae
- Family: Araneidae
- Genus: Gea
- Species: G. heptagon

Binomial name
- Gea heptagon (Hentz, 1850)

= Gea heptagon =

Heptagonal Orbweaver

Species of spider

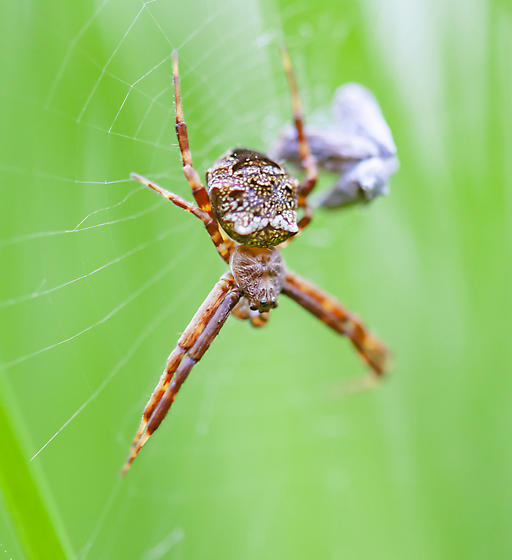
Heptagonal Orbweaver spider

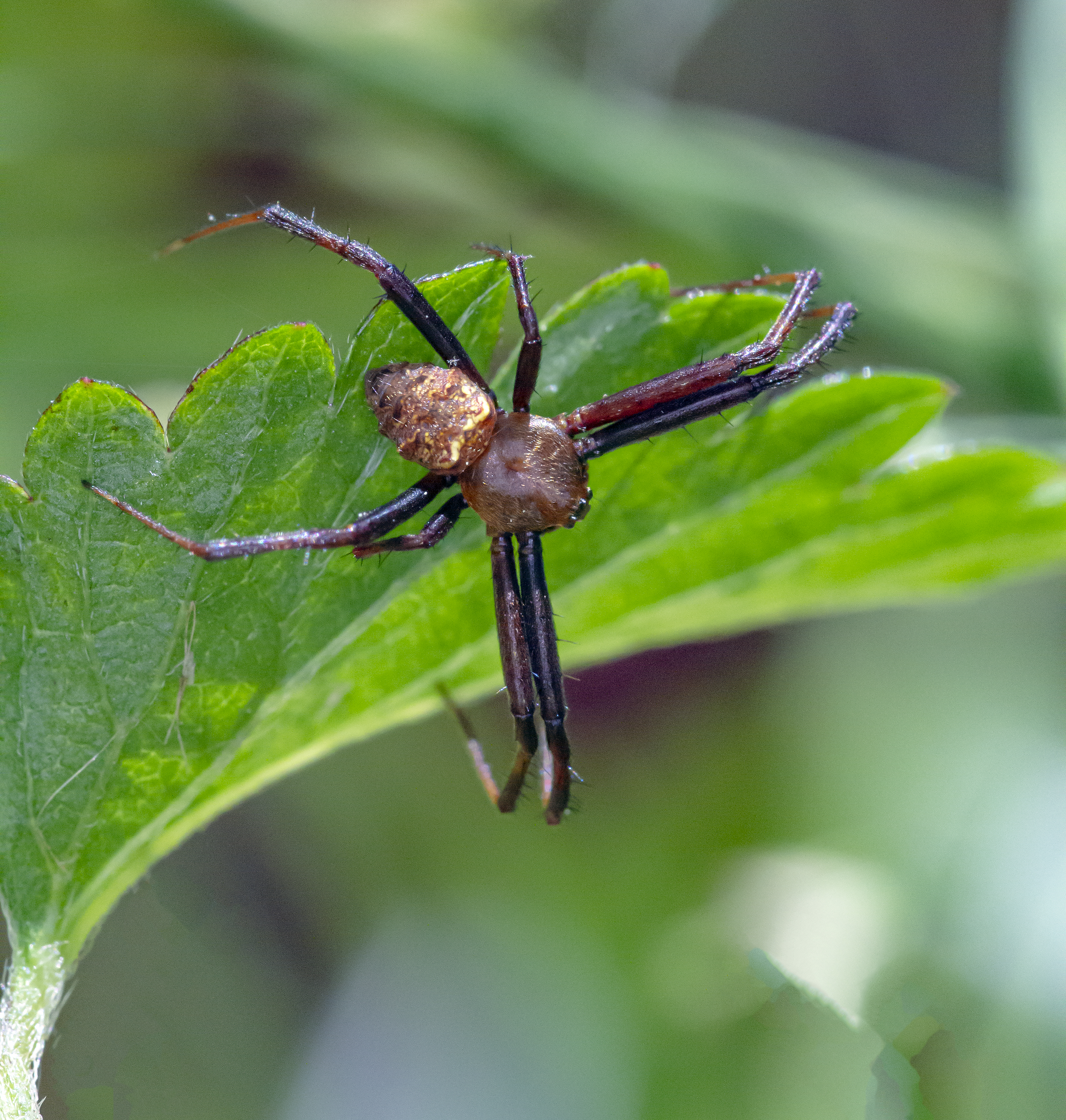
Male Heptagonal Orbweaver

Gea heptagon is a species of orb weaver spiders in the family Araneidae. It is found in Pacific islands and Australia, and has been introduced into the United States and Argentina.
