= Entomologische Berichten =

Entomologische Berichten is a Dutch journal with articles about insects, most of the texts are in Dutch language. It was first published in 1918. Today it is published six times a year.
