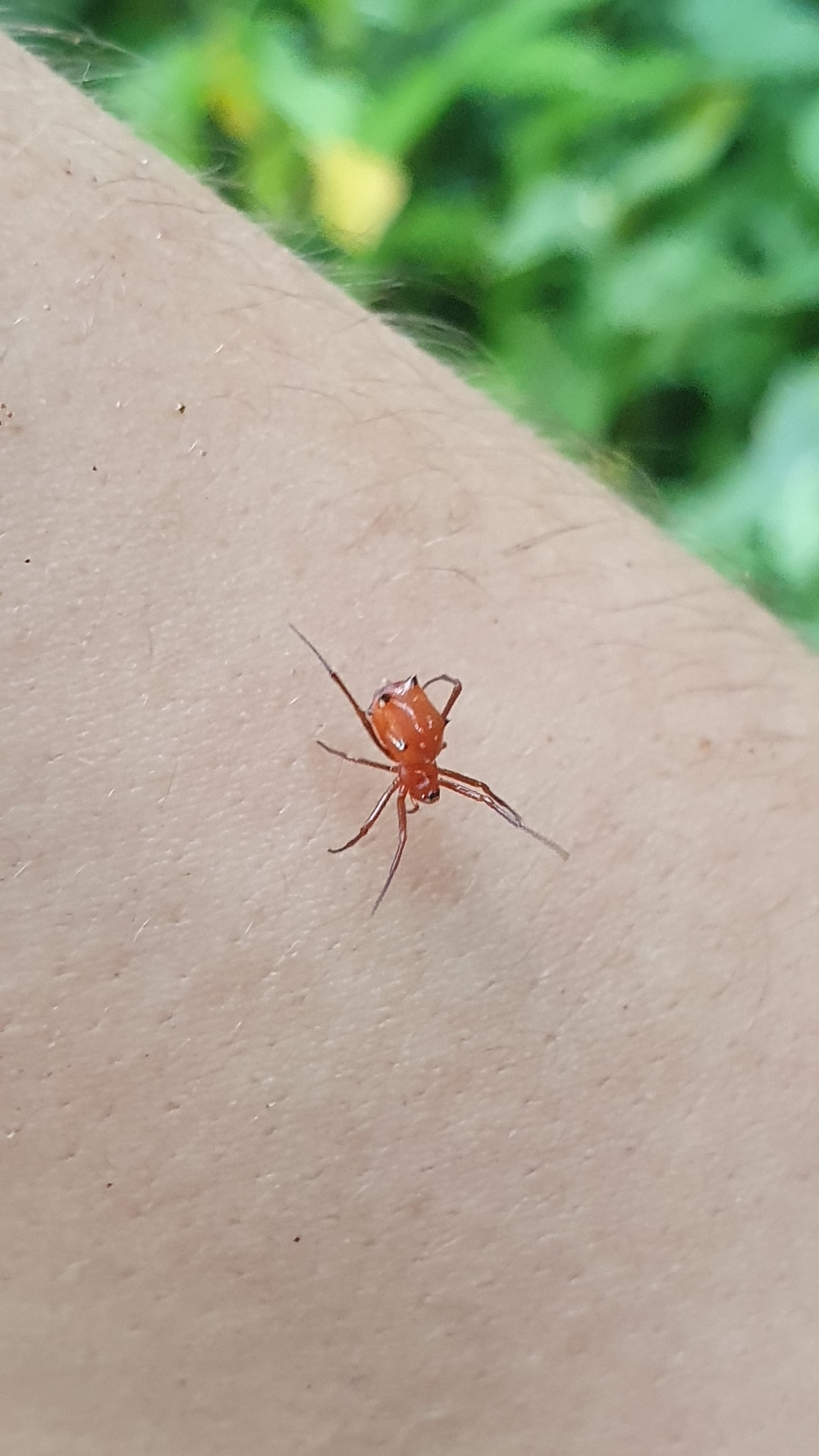
- specimen from Mexico

Scientific classification
- Kingdom: Animalia
- Phylum: Arthropoda
- Subphylum: Chelicerata
- Class: Arachnida
- Order: Araneae
- Infraorder: Araneomorphae
- Family: Araneidae
- Genus: Pronous; Keyserling, 1881

Type species
- P. tuberculifer Keyserling, 1881

Species
- 16, see text

Synonyms
- Zigana Chamberlin & Ivie, 1936

= Pronous =

Genus of spiders

Pronous is a genus of South American and African orb-weaver spiders first described by Eugen von Keyserling in 1881.

== Species ==
As of April 2019 it contains sixteen species:

- Pronous affinis Simon, 1901 – Malaysia
- Pronous beatus (O. Pickard-Cambridge, 1893) – Mexico to Costa Rica
- Pronous colon Levi, 1995 – Costa Rica
- Pronous felipe Levi, 1995 – Mexico
- Pronous golfito Levi, 1995 – Costa Rica
- Pronous intus Levi, 1995 – Costa Rica to Brazil
- Pronous lancetilla Levi, 1995 – Honduras
- Pronous nigripes Caporiacco, 1947 – Guyana
- Pronous pance Levi, 1995 – Colombia
- Pronous peje Levi, 1995 – Costa Rica, Panama
- Pronous quintana Levi, 1995 – Mexico
- Pronous shanus Levi, 1995 – Panama
- Pronous tetralobus Simon, 1895 – Madagascar
- Pronous tuberculifer Keyserling, 1881 (type) – Colombia to Argentina
- Pronous valle Levi, 1995 – Colombia
- Pronous wixoides (Chamberlin & Ivie, 1936) – Panama, Colombia, Ecuador
