= Michael H. Robinson =

British zoologist

Michael H. Robinson (1929, Preston, Lancashire, England — March 22, 2008, Alexandria, Virginia) was a British zoologist who directed the National Zoo in Washington D.C., for 16 years, from 1984 to 2000.

Robinson received his undergraduate degree from the University of Wales, in 1963, and his doctorate in zoology, in 1966, from Oxford University, where he studied under Nobel laureate Nikolaas Tinbergen. Prior to his work at the National Zoo, Robinson spent 18 years in Panama, Central America, studying animal behavior at the Smithsonian Tropical Research Institute. There, he researched spiders, crabs, otters, stick insects, and marine life.

His publications include numerous articles and several books. With David Challinor and Holly Webber he wrote the guide book Zoo Animals: a Smithsonian guide (1995).

He was married to biologist Barbara Robinson, his colleague for many years, from whom he was divorced.

== Bibliography ==
- Robinson, Michael (1995). Zoo Animals. New York: Macmillan USA. ISBN 0-02-860407-5.

== Sources ==
- Holley, J. 2008. "In Memoriam: Michael H. Robinson (1929-2008)" Arch. Biol. Sci. Belgrade, 60(2): 325–326.
