= Netherlands Entomological Society =

Scientific society

The Netherlands Entomological Society (Dutch: Nederlandse Entomologische Vereniging, abbreviated NEV) was founded in 1845 for the purpose of improving and promoting entomology in the Netherlands. The society has more than 600 members.
