= Spider web =

Structure created by a spider from silk

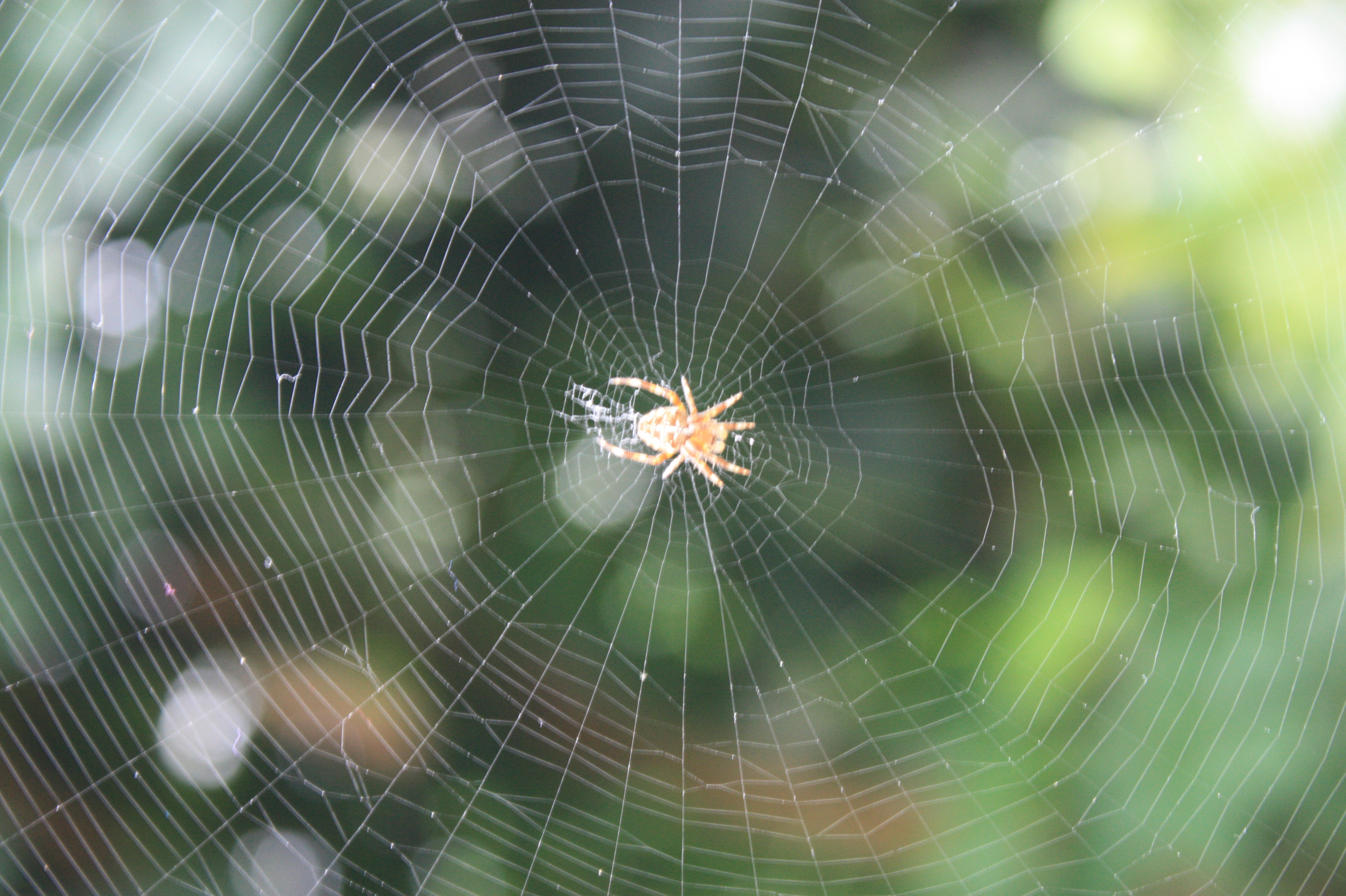
A classic circular web built by an orb-weaver spider

Infographic illustrating the process of constructing an orb web

A spider web, spiderweb, spider's web, cobweb or even just web (from the Middle English coppeweb) is a mist net-like structure built by spiders using proteinaceous spider silk extruded from their spinnerets, generally dressed with adhesive mucus, for trapping flying prey such as insects. Most webs are suspended vertically between such as tree/shrub branches and building walls, but there are some spiders who use horizontally laid or funnel-shaped webs as a vibratory early warning device for ambush hunting or against potential predators. Some species of spider can even use webs as a parafoil to catch wind and achieve a form of aerial locomotion known as ballooning.

Spider webs have existed for at least 100 million years, as witnessed in a rare find of Early Cretaceous amber from Sussex, in southern England. Many spiders build webs specifically to trap flying insects, which are otherwise difficult to catch. However, not all spiders catch their prey in webs, and some do not build webs at all. The word "cobweb" is used specifically by biologists to describe the tangled three-dimensional web of some spiders of the family Theridiidae.

== Silk production ==
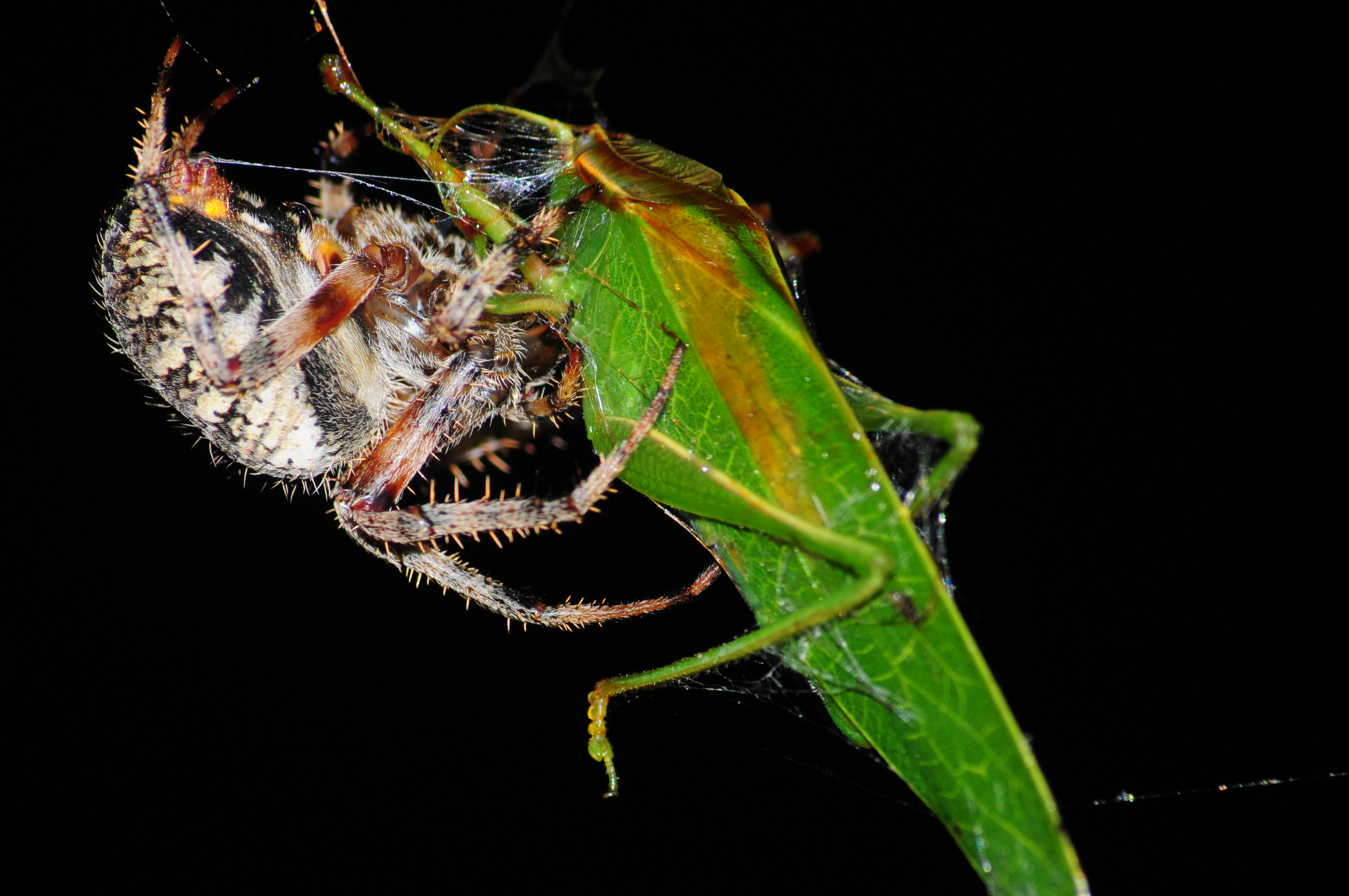
Clearly visible spider silk production

When archaic spiders moved from the water to the land in the Early Devonian period, they started making silk to protect their bodies and their eggs. Most spiders have appendages called spinnerets. These are organs that produce silk with which the spiders spin webs (although some use the silk to catch their prey in other ways). Spiders gradually started using silk for hunting purposes, first as guide lines and signal lines, then as ground or bush webs, and eventually as the aerial webs that are currently familiar.

Spiders produce silk from their spinneret glands located at the tip of their abdomen. Each gland produces a thread for a special purpose – for example a trailed safety line, sticky silk for trapping prey or fine silk for wrapping it. Spiders use different gland types to produce different silks, and some spiders are capable of producing up to eight different silks during their lifetime.

Most spiders have three pairs of spinnerets, each having its own function – there are also spiders with just one pair and others with as many as four pairs.

Webs allow a spider to catch prey without having to expend energy by running it down, making it an efficient method of gathering food. The hair and claws on spiders' legs allow them to cling to their webs. The oils on their bodies keep them from sticking to their own webs. However these energy savings are somewhat offset by the fact that constructing the web is in itself energetically costly, due to the large amount of protein required in the form of silk. In addition, after a time the silk will lose its stickiness and thus become inefficient at capturing prey. It is common for spiders to eat their own web daily to recoup some of the energy used in spinning. Through ingestion and digestion, the silk proteins are thus recycled. Due to the incredible strength of spider silk, scientists are currently studying it in the hope of creating a super-tough material with similar properties.

== Types ==
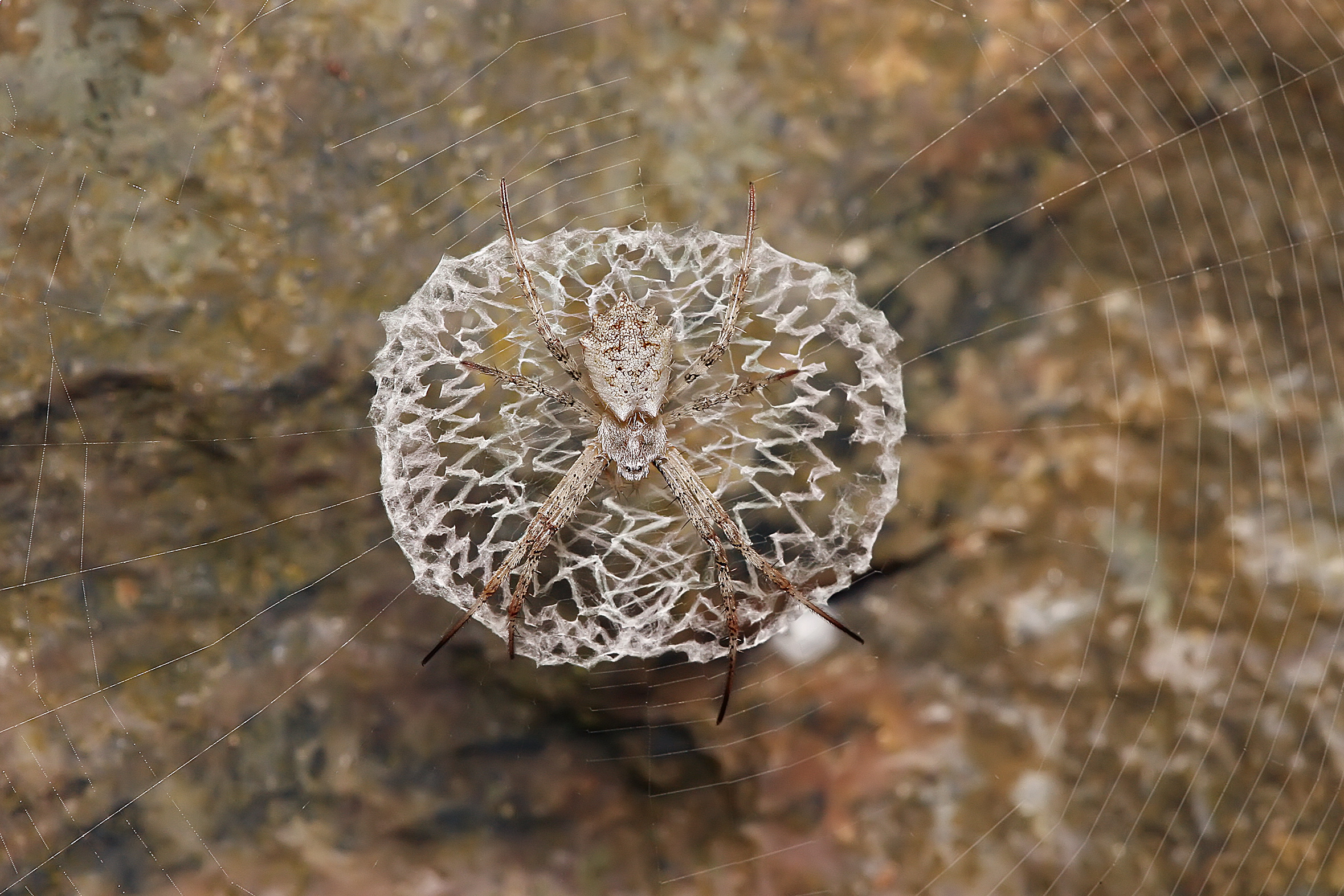
Argiope sp. sitting on web decorations at the center of the web

There are a few types of spider webs found in the wild, and many spiders are classified by the webs they weave. Different types of spider webs include:

- Spiral orb webs, associated primarily with the family Araneidae, as well as Tetragnathidae and Uloboridae
- Tangle webs or cobwebs, associated with the family Theridiidae
- Funnel webs, with associations divided into primitive and modern
- Tubular webs, which run up the bases of trees or along the ground
- Sheet webs

Several different types of silk may be used in web construction, including a "sticky" capture silk and "fluffy" capture silk, depending on the type of spider. Webs may be in a vertical plane (most orb webs), a horizontal plane (sheet webs), or at any angle in between. It is hypothesized that these types of aerial webs co-evolved with the evolution of winged insects. As insects are spiders' main prey, it is likely that they would impose strong selectional forces on the foraging behavior of spiders. Most commonly found in the sheet-web spider families, some webs will have loose, irregular tangles of silk above them. These tangled obstacle courses serve to disorient and knock down flying insects, making them more vulnerable to being trapped on the web below. They may also help to protect the spider from predators such as birds and wasps. It is reported that several Nephila pilipes individuals can collectively construct an aggregated web system to counter bird predation from all directions.

Larinioides cornutus builds its web.

=== Orb web construction ===
Most orb weavers construct webs in a vertical plane, although there are exceptions, such as Uloborus diversus, which builds a horizontal web. During the process of making an orb web, the spider will use its own body for measurements. There is variation in web construction among orb-weaving spiders, in particular, the species Zygiella x-notata is known for its characteristic missing sector web crossed by a single signal thread.

Many webs span gaps between objects which the spider could not cross by crawling. This is done by first producing a fine adhesive thread to drift on a faint breeze across a gap. When it sticks to a surface at the far end, the spider feels the change in the vibration. The spider reels in and tightens the first strand, then carefully walks along it and strengthens it with a second thread. This process is repeated until the thread is strong enough to support the rest of the web.

After strengthening the first thread, the spider continues to make a Y-shaped netting. The first three radials of the web are now constructed. More radials are added, making sure that the distance between each radial and the next is small enough to cross. This means that the number of radials in a web directly depends on the size of the spider plus the size of the web. It is common for a web to be about 20 times the size of the spider building it.

After the radials are complete, the spider fortifies the center of the web with about five circular threads. It makes a spiral of non-sticky, widely spaced threads to enable it to move easily around its own web during construction, working from the inside outward. Then, beginning from the outside and moving inward, the spider methodically replaces this spiral with a more closely spaced one made of adhesive threads. It uses the initial radiating lines as well as the non-sticky spirals as guide lines. The spaces between each spiral and the next are directly proportional to the distance from the tip of its back legs to its spinners. This is one way the spider uses its own body as a measuring/spacing device. While the sticky spirals are formed, the non-adhesive spirals are removed as there is no need for them any more.

After the spider has completed its web, it chews off the initial three center spiral threads then sits and waits, usually with the head facing downwards. If the web is broken without any structural damage during the construction, the spider does not make any initial attempts to rectify the problem.

The spider, after spinning its web, then waits on or near the web for a prey animal to become trapped. The spider senses the impact and struggle of a prey animal by vibrations transmitted through the web. A trap line is constructed by some species specifically to transmit this vibration. A spider positioned in the middle of the web makes for a highly visible prey for birds and other predators, even without web decorations; many day-hunting orb-web spinners reduce this risk by hiding at the edge of the web with one foot on a signal line from the hub or by appearing to be inedible or unappetizing.

Spiders do not usually adhere to their own webs, because they are able to spin both sticky and non-sticky types of silk, and are careful to travel across only non-sticky portions of the web. However, they are not immune to their own glue. Some of the strands of the web are sticky, and others are not. For example, if a spider has chosen to wait along the outer edges of its web, it may spin a non-sticky prey or signal line to the web hub to monitor web movement. However, in the course of spinning sticky strands, spiders have to touch these sticky strands. They do this without sticking by using careful movements, dense hairs and nonstick coatings on their feet to prevent adhesion.

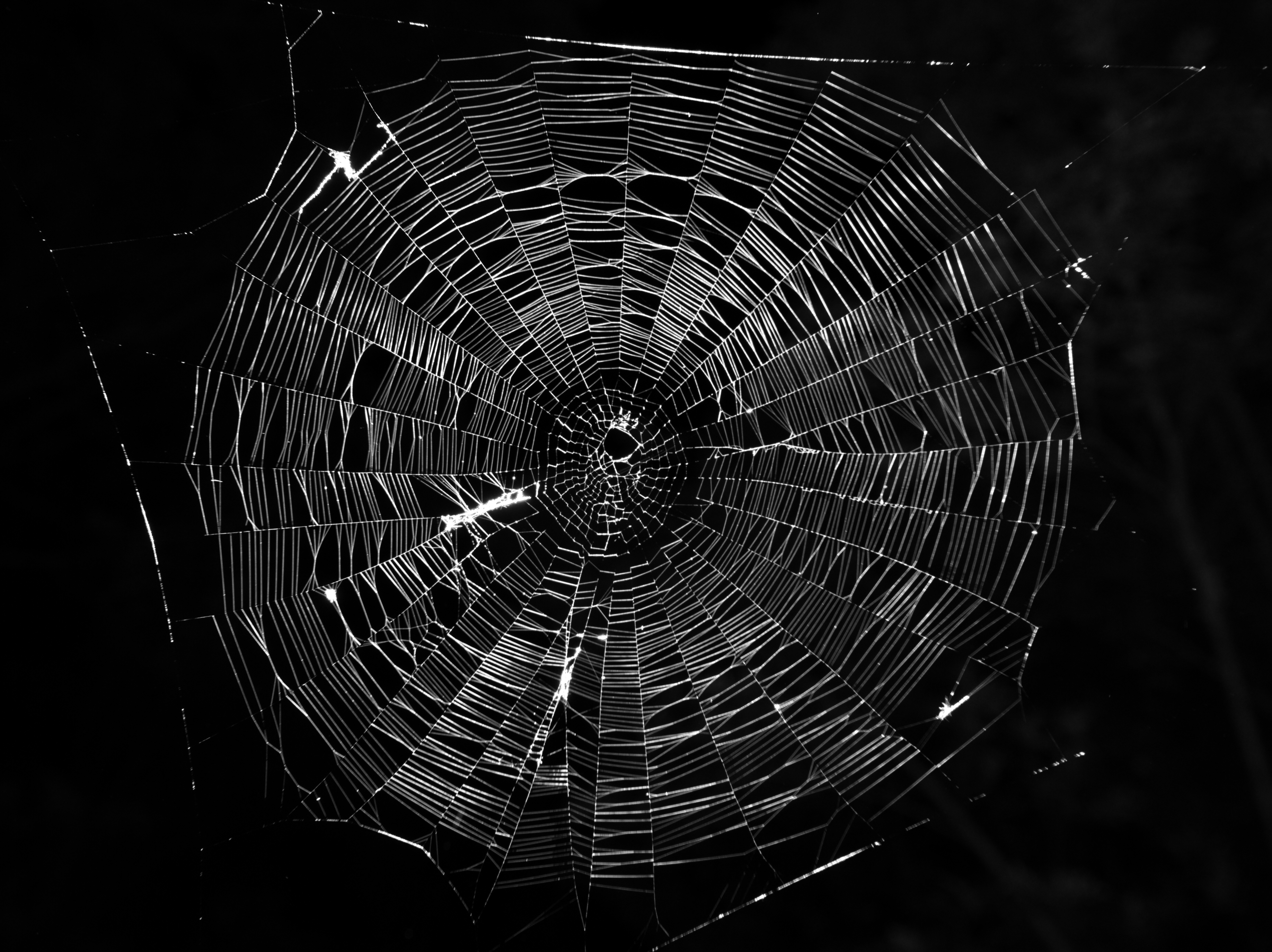
A typical orb web constructed by an Araneus (family Araneidae) spider

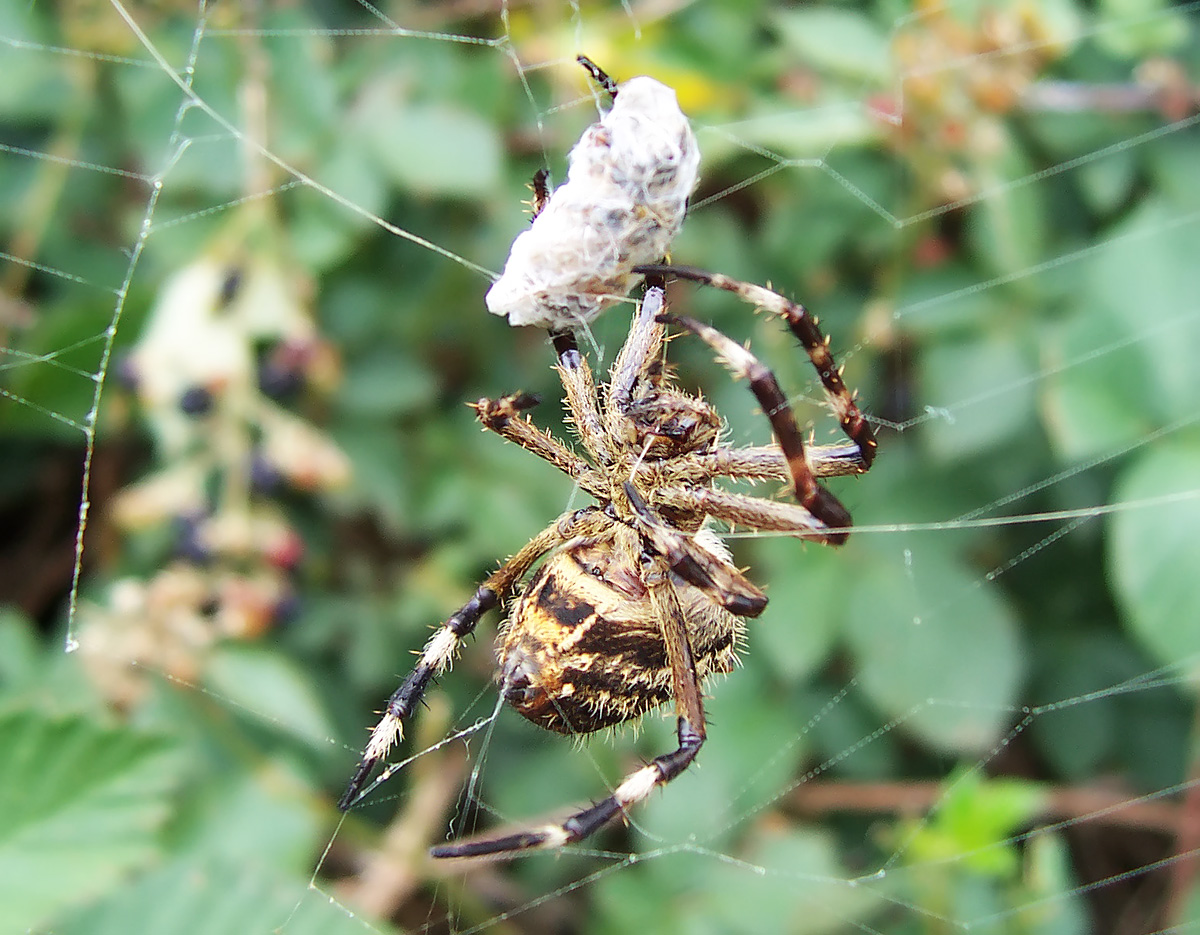
Australian garden orb weaver spider, after having captured prey

== Uses ==
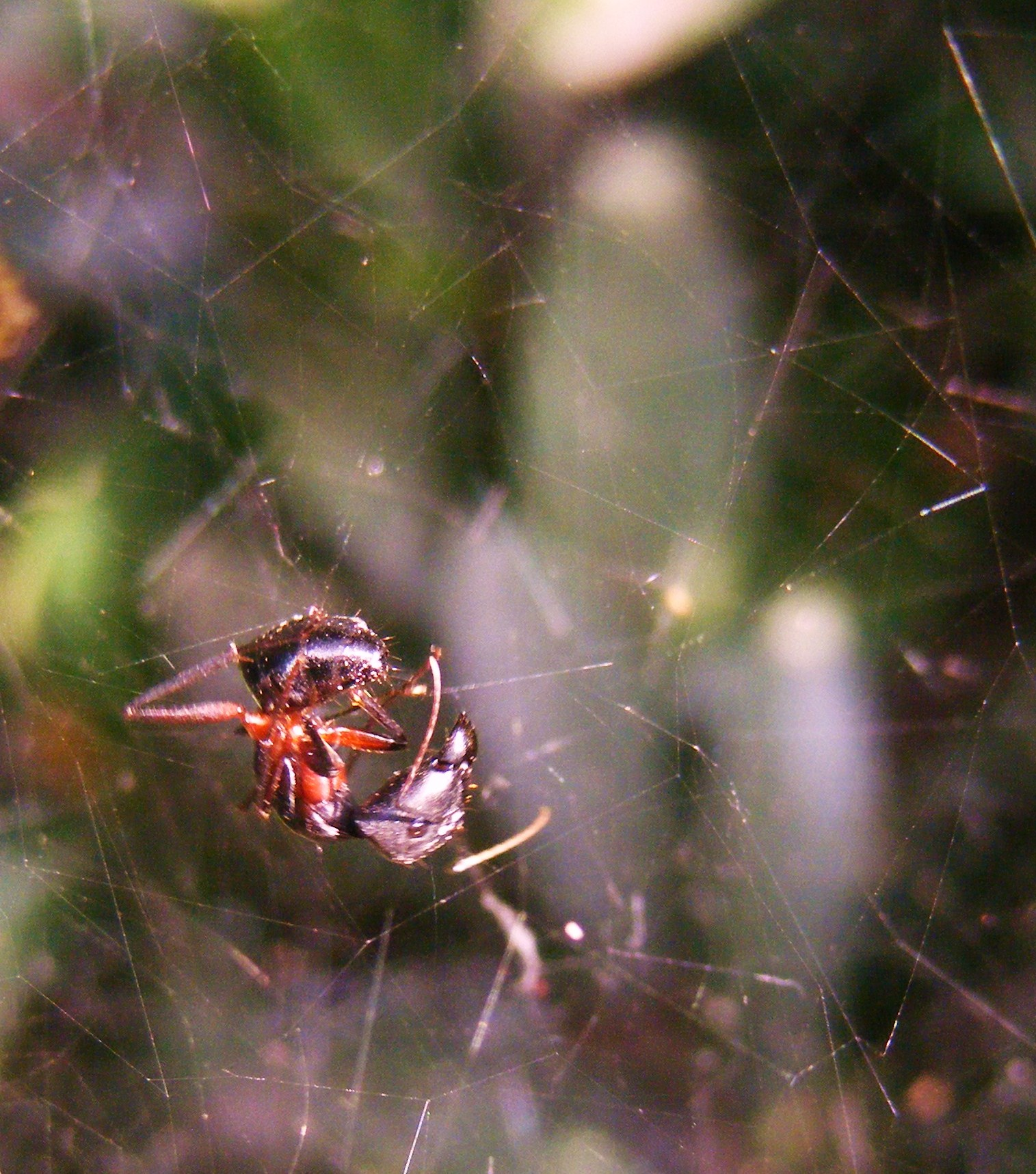
An ant finds itself entangled in the web of a spider.

Some spiders use their webs for hearing, where the giant webs function as extended and reconfigurable auditory sensors.

Not all use their webs for capturing prey directly, instead pouncing from concealment (e.g. trapdoor spiders) or running them down in open chase (e.g. wolf spiders). The net-casting spider balances the two methods of running and web spinning in its feeding habits. This spider weaves a small net which it attaches to its front legs. It then lurks in wait for potential prey and, when such prey arrives, lunges forward to wrap its victim in the net, bite and paralyze it. Hence, this spider expends less energy catching prey than a primitive hunter such as the wolf spider. It also avoids the energy loss of weaving a large orb web.

Many species also spin threads of silk to catch the wind and then sail on the wind to a new location.

Others manage to use the signaling-snare technique of a web without spinning a web at all. Several types of water-dwelling spiders rest their feet on the water's surface in much the same manner as an orb-web user. When an insect falls onto the water and is ensnared by surface tension, the spider can detect the vibrations and run out to capture the prey.

The diving bell spider and Desis marina, an intertidal species, use their web to trap air under water, where they can stay submerged long periods of time.

=== Human use ===
Cobweb paintings, which began during the 16th century in a remote valley of the Austrian Tyrolean Alps, were created on fabrics consisting of layered and wound cobwebs, stretched over cardboard to make a mat, and strengthened by brushing with milk diluted in water. A small brush was then used to apply watercolor to the cobwebs, or custom tools to create engravings. Fewer than a hundred cobweb paintings survive today, most of which are held in private collections.

In traditional European medicine, cobwebs were used on wounds and cuts to reduce bleeding and aid healing. This use was recorded in ancient Greece and Rome, and was mentioned in Shakespeare's A Midsummer Night's Dream. Spider webs have been shown to significantly reduce wound healing times. They are rich in vitamin K, which is essential in blood clotting, and their large surface area is also thought to help coagulation. During the 1st century BC, the Roman army used spider webs as field dressings, which also served as a fungicide.

The effects of some drugs can be measured by examining their effects on a spider's web-building.

In northeastern Nigeria, cow horn resonators in traditional xylophones often have holes covered with spider webs to create a buzzing sound.

Spider web strands have been used for crosshairs or reticles in telescopes.

Development of technologies to mass-produce spider silk has led to the manufacturing of prototype military protection, wound dressings and other medical devices, and consumer goods.

Spider webs can be used as a single step catalyst to make nanoparticles.

== Physical and chemical properties ==
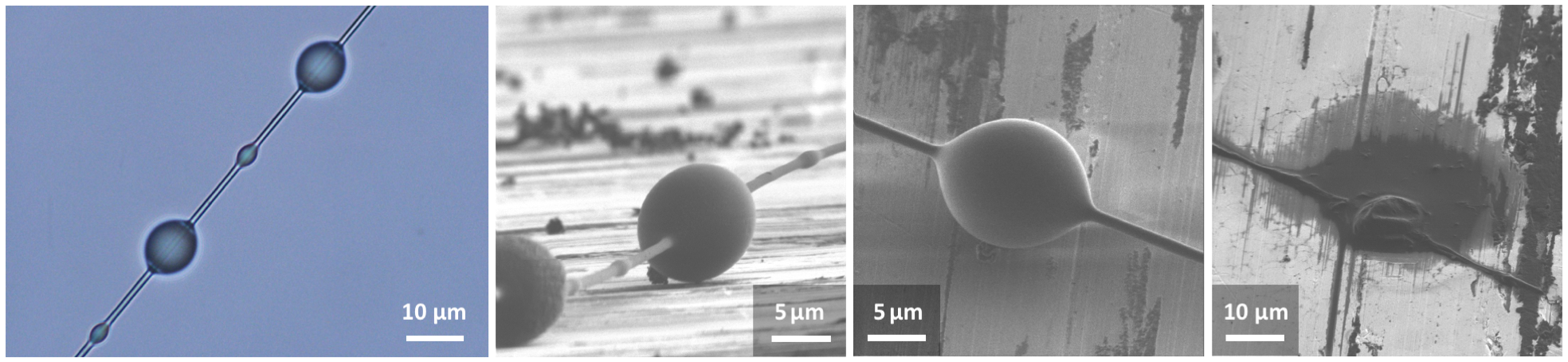
The figure on the left is an optical microscope image of glue balls. The second figure from left is a scanning ion secondary electron image of the glue balls. The two figures on the right are the scanning ion secondary electron images before and after adhesion of the substrate to the glue ball.

The secret behind a spider web's stickiness lies in the tiny glue droplets dotting its silk threads. Orb-weaver spiders, such as Larinioides cornutus, coat their silk with a special hygroscopic substance that keeps the glue soft and tacky by drawing in water from the air. This built-in humidity control prevents the adhesive from drying out too quickly. The hardening of the viscoelastic protein is indirectly controlled by changes in water content, which in turn affect the concentration of the ionic liquid. As this balance shifts, the glue's viscosity adjusts, helping the web maintain its grip on captured prey.

The web is electrically conductive which causes the silk threads to spring out to trap their quarry, as flying insects tend to gain a static charge which attracts the silk.

Neurotoxins have been detected in the glue balls of some spider webs. Presumably these toxins help immobilize prey, but their function could also be antimicrobial, or protection from ants or other animals that steal from the webs or might attack the spider.

Spider silk has greater tensile strength than the same weight of steel and much greater elasticity. Its microstructure is under investigation for potential applications in industry, including bullet-proof vests and artificial tendons. Researchers have used genetically modified mammals and bacteria to produce the proteins needed to make this material.

== Communal spider webs ==
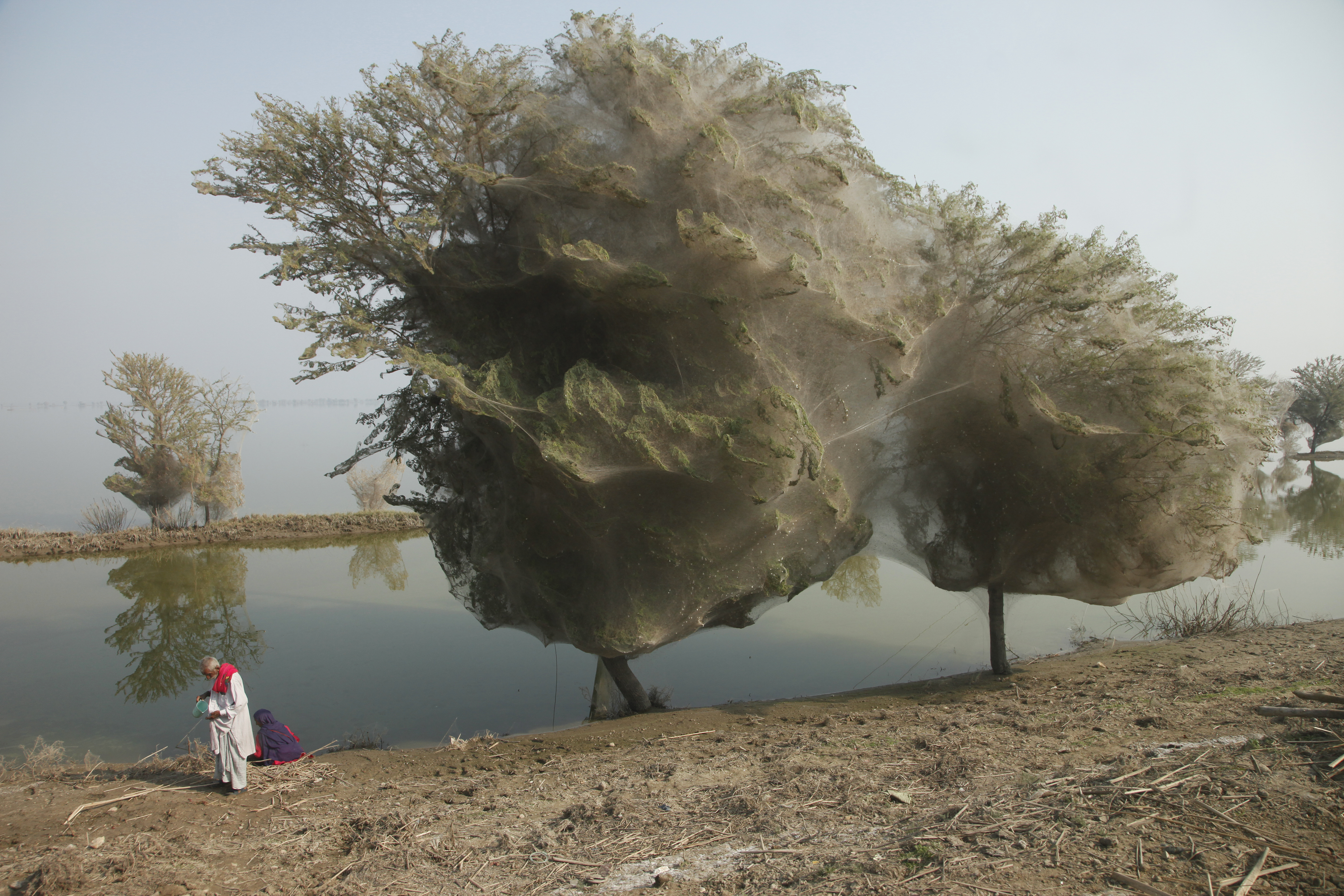
After severe, extensive flooding in Sindh, Pakistan, many trees were covered with spider webs.

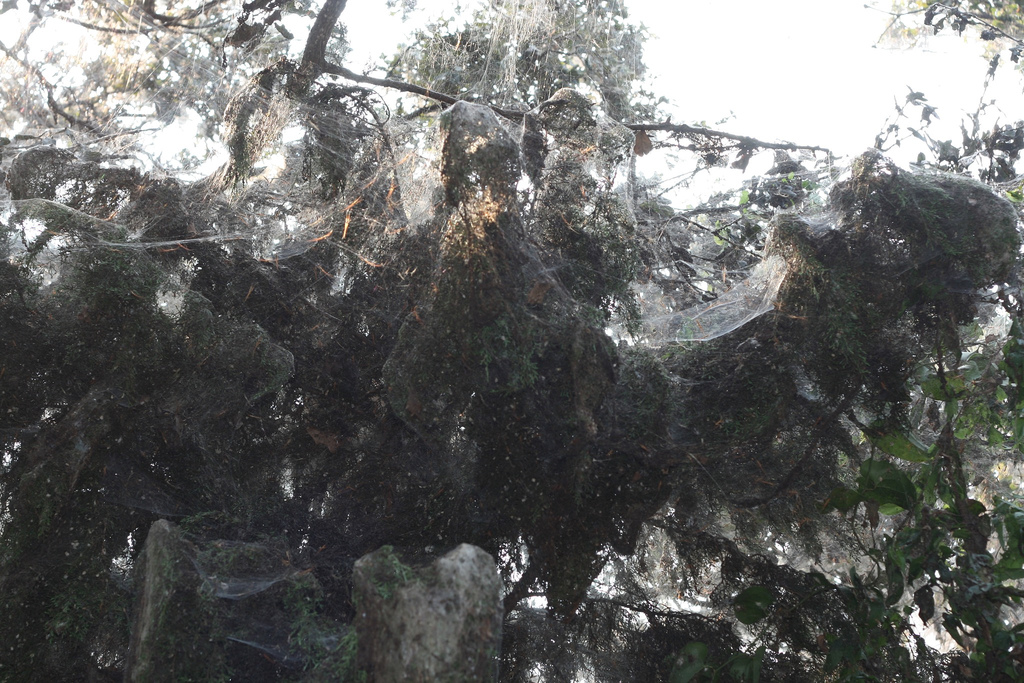
The communal spider web at Lake Tawakoni State Park

Occasionally, a group of spiders may build webs together in the same area.

Massive flooding in Pakistan during the 2010 monsoon drove spiders above the waterline, into trees. The result was trees covered with spider webs.

One such web, reported in 2007 at Lake Tawakoni State Park in Texas, measured 200 yards (180 m) across. Entomologists believe it may be the result of social cobweb spiders or of spiders building webs to spread out from one another. There is no consensus on how common this occurrence is.

In Brazil, there have been two instances of a phenomenon that became known as "raining spiders"; communal webs made by "social" spiders that cover such wide gaps and which strings are so difficult to see that hundreds of spiders seem to be floating in the air. The first occurred in Santo Antônio da Platina, Paraná, in 2013, and involved Anelosimus eximius individuals; the second was registered in Espírito Santo do Dourado, Minas Gerais, in January 2019, and involved Parawixia bistriata individuals.

A web over 100 square metres (1,100 sq ft) built by thousands of Tegenaria domestica (which was not previously known to form colonies) and shared by Prinerigone vagans was found in the Sulfur Cave between Greece and Albania. The discoverers hypothesize that the darkness and size difference allow P. vagans not to be predated by the larger T. domestica. The colony is sustained by an abundance of chemoautotrophic bacteria and its predators.

== Low gravity ==
It has been observed that being in Earth's orbit has an effect on the structure of spider webs in space.

Spider webs were spun in low Earth orbit in 1973 aboard Skylab, involving two female European garden spiders (cross spiders) called Arabella and Anita, as part of an experiment on the Skylab 3 mission. The aim of the experiment was to test whether the two spiders would spin webs in space, and, if so, whether these webs would be the same as those that spiders produced on Earth. The experiment was a student project of Judy Miles of Lexington, Massachusetts.

After the launch on July 28, 1973, and entering Skylab, the spiders were released by astronaut Owen Garriott into a box that resembled a window frame. The spiders proceeded to construct their web while a camera took photographs and examined the spiders' behavior in a zero-gravity environment. Both spiders took a long time to adapt to their weightless existence. However, after a day, Arabella spun the first web in the experimental cage, although it was initially incomplete.

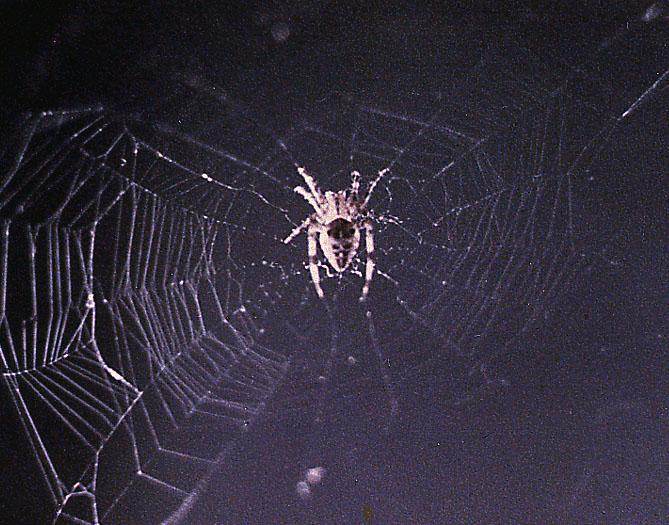
The first web spun by the spider Arabella in orbit

The web was completed the following day. The crew members were prompted to expand the initial protocol. They fed and watered the spiders, giving them a house fly. The first web was removed on August 13 to allow the spider to construct a second web. At first, the spider failed to construct a new web. When given more water, it built a second web. This time, it was more elaborate than the first. Both spiders died during the mission, possibly from dehydration.

When scientists were given the opportunity to study the webs, they discovered that the space webs were finer than normal Earth webs, and although the patterns of the web were not totally dissimilar, variations were spotted, and there was a definite difference in the characteristics of the web. Additionally, while the webs were finer overall, the space web had variations in thickness in places: some places were slightly thinner, and others slightly thicker. This was unusual, because Earth webs have been observed to have uniform thickness.

Later experiments indicated that having access to a light source could orient the spiders and enable them to build their normal asymmetric webs when gravity was not a factor.

== In culture ==
Spider webs play a crucial role in the 1952 children's novel Charlotte's Web. Webs are also featured in many other cultural depictions of spiders. In films, illustration, and other visual arts, spider webs may be used to readily suggest a "spooky" atmosphere, or imply neglect or the passage of time. Artificial "spider webs" are a common element of Halloween decorations. Spider webs are a common image in tattoo art, often symbolizing long periods of time spent in prison, or used simply to fill gaps between other images.

Some observers believe that a small spider is depicted on the United States one-dollar bill, in the upper-right corner of the front side (obverse), perched on the shield surrounding the number "1". This perception is enhanced by the resemblance of the background image of intertwining fine lines to a stylized spider web. However, other observers believe the figure is an owl.

The World Wide Web is thus named because of its tangled and interlaced structure, said to resemble that of a spider web.

Itsy Bitsy Spider is a popular nursery rhyme about the adventures of a spider.

Artificial spider webs are used by the superhero Spider-Man to restrain enemies and to make ropes on which to swing between buildings as quick transportation. Some incarnations of the character, such as the version in the Sam Raimi film trilogy and Spider-Man 2099, are shown to be able to produce organic webs.

The notable tensile strength of spider webs is often exaggerated in science fiction, often as a plot device to justify the presence of artificially giant spiders.

Posters used by the women at Greenham Common Women's Peace Camp often featured the symbol of a spider web, meant to symbolise the fragility as well as the perseverance of the protesters.

The Quran uses the fragility of the spider's web as a parable, comparing it to the faith of idolators.

== Gallery ==
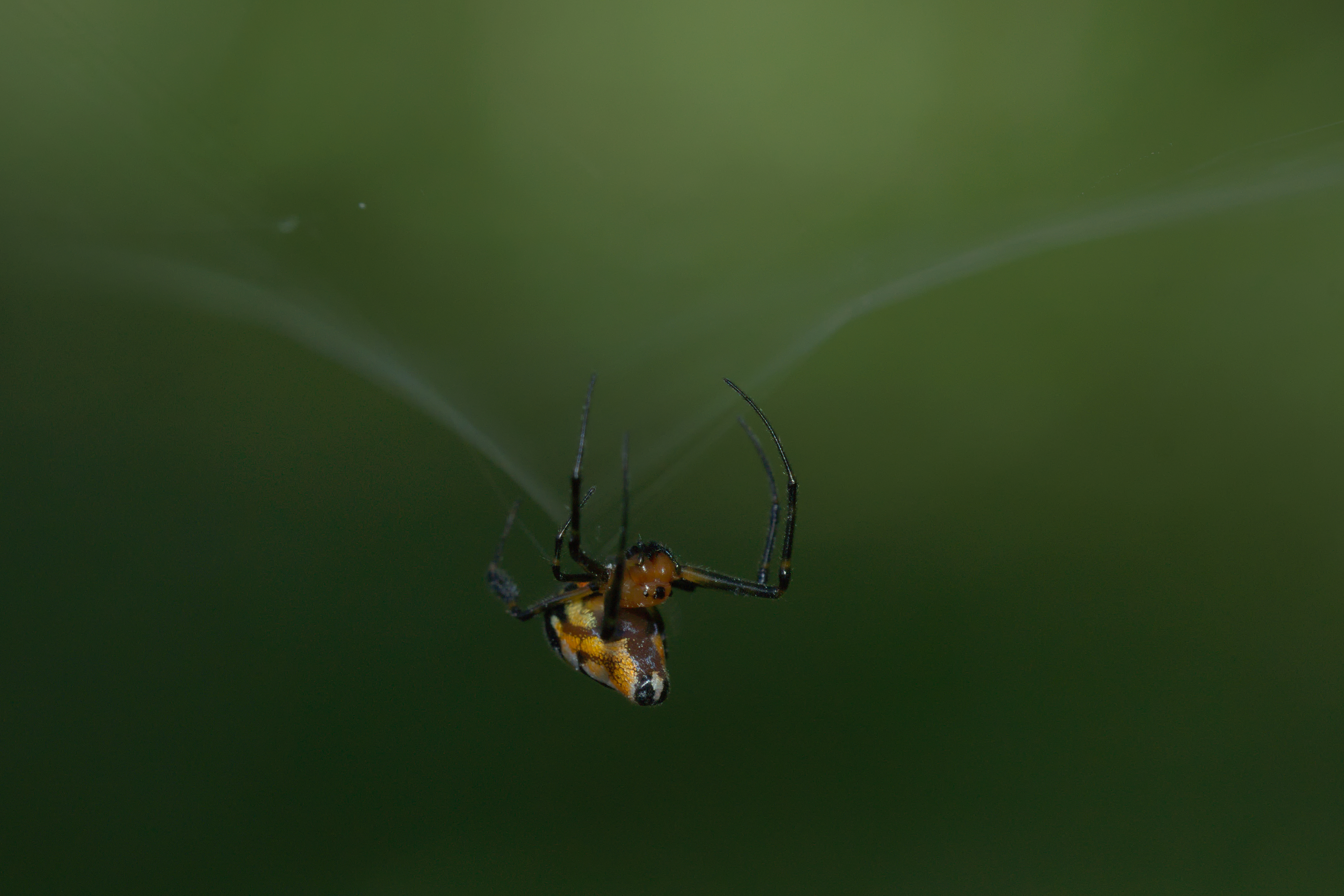
Opadometa fastigata weaving the web. See the silk coming from the spinneret glands located at the tip of the abdomen.

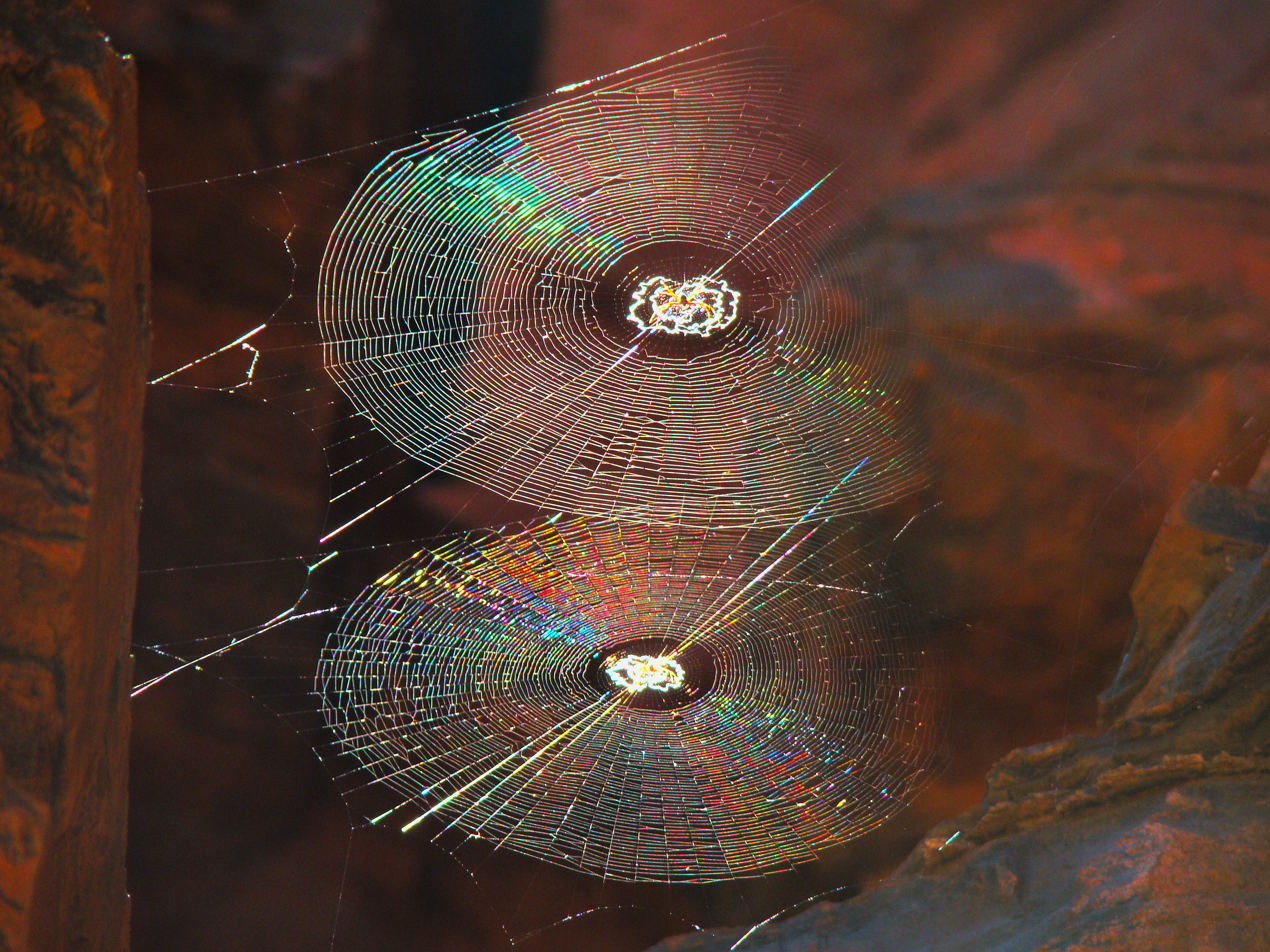
Spiral orb webs in Karijini, Western Australia

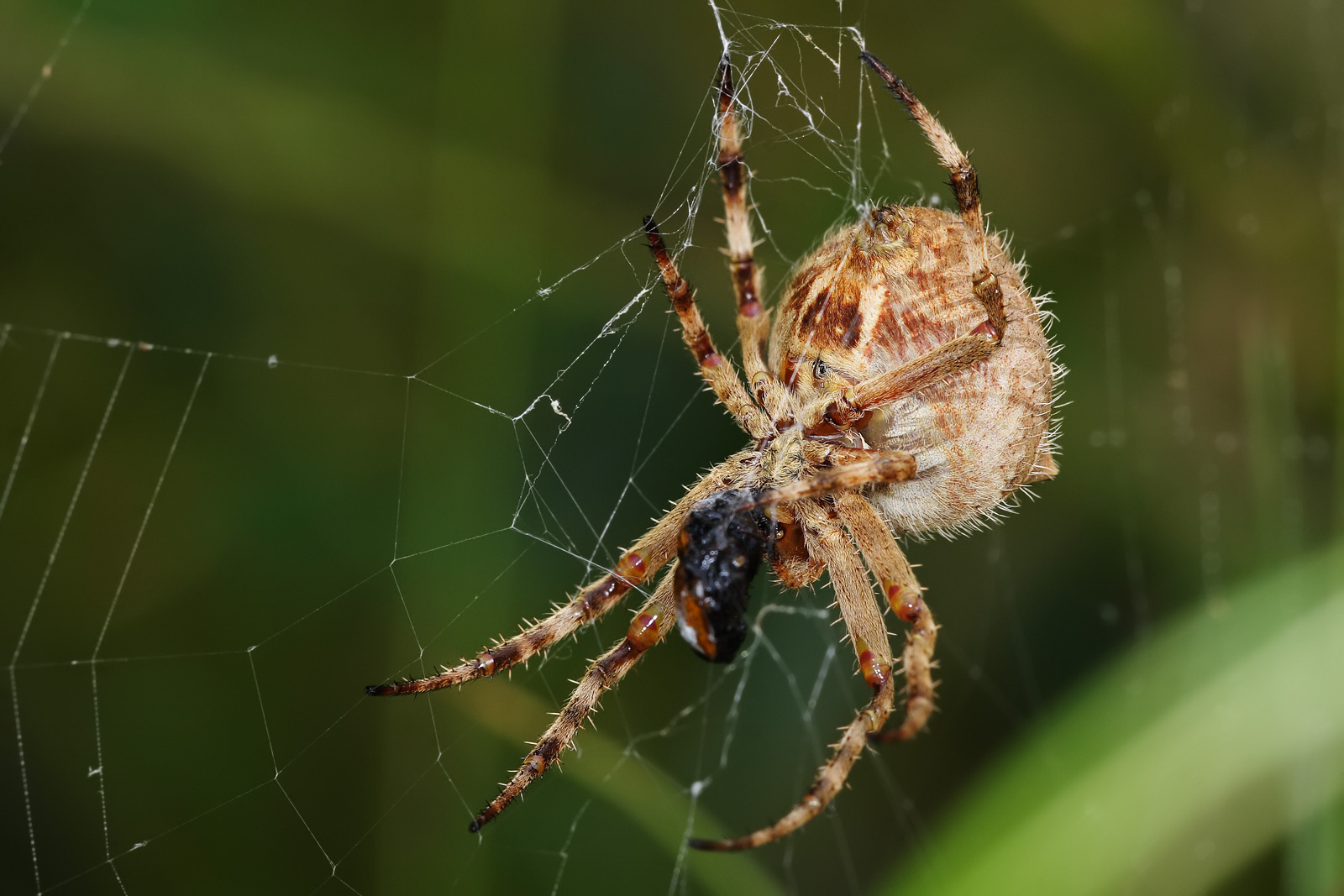
Garden Orbweaver with beetle prey caught in its web

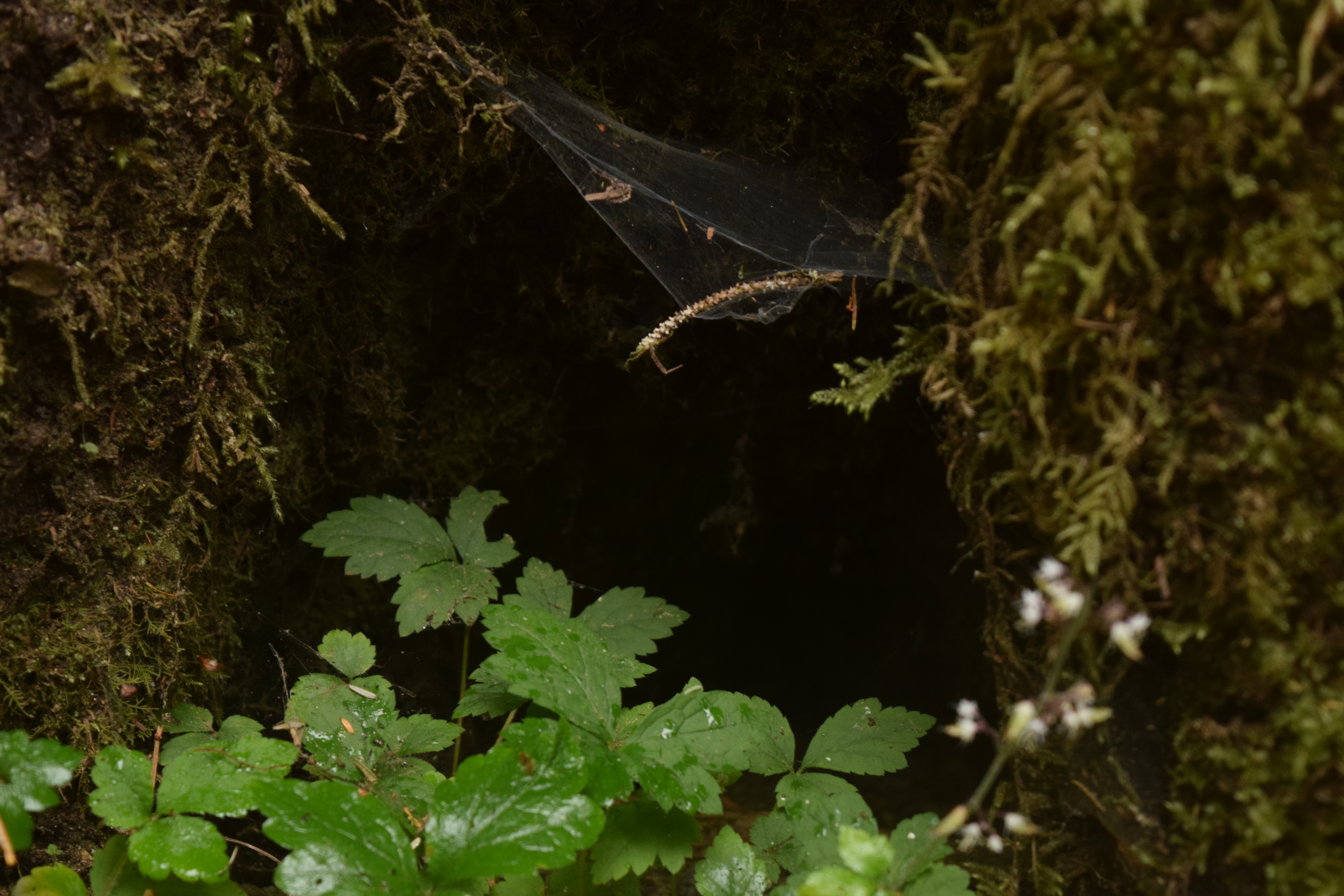
Spider web in the Hoh Rainforest in Olympic National Park

== See also ==
- Filter feeder
- Effect of psychoactive drugs on animals#Spiders
