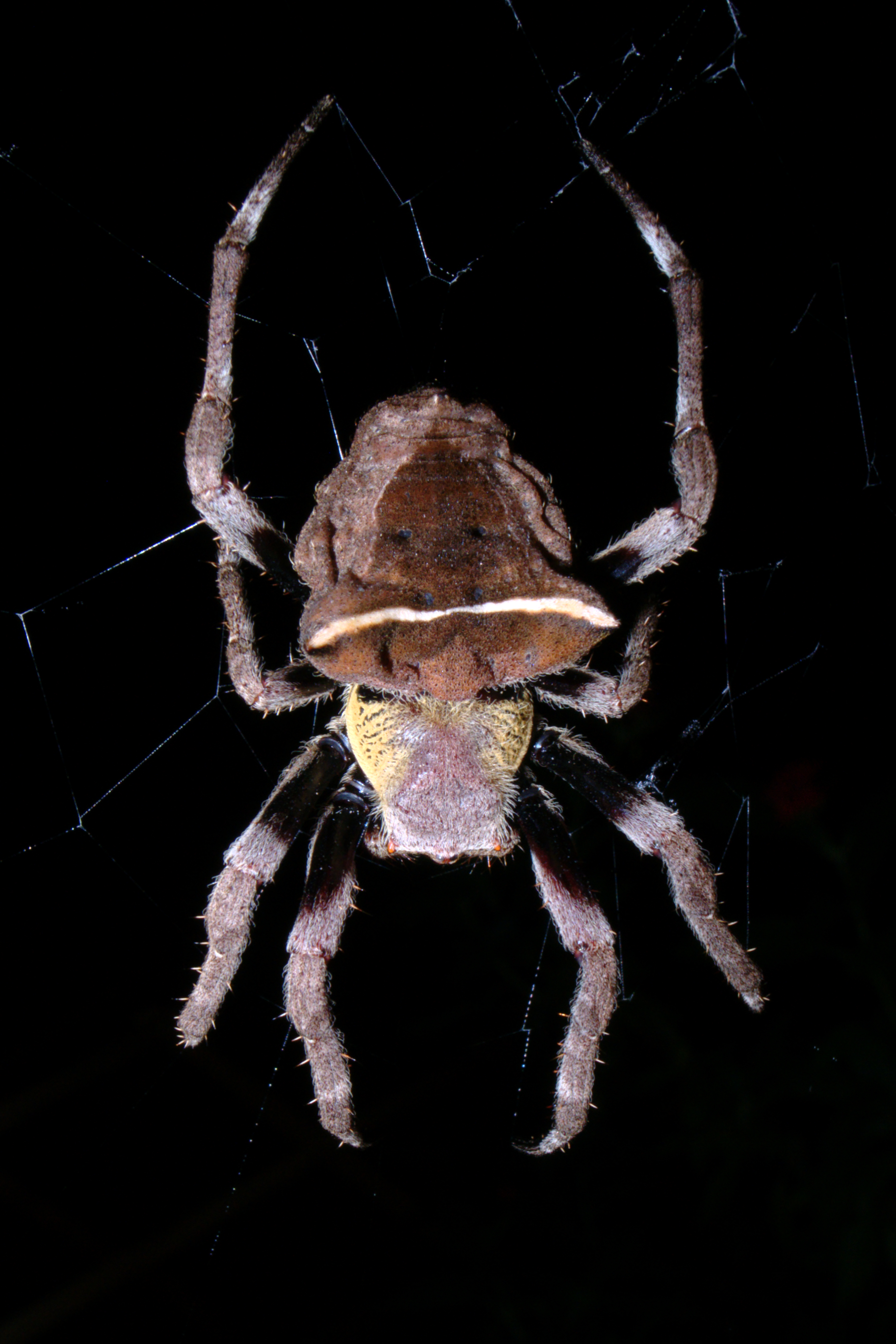
- Female

Scientific classification
- Kingdom: Animalia
- Phylum: Arthropoda
- Subphylum: Chelicerata
- Class: Arachnida
- Order: Araneae
- Infraorder: Araneomorphae
- Family: Araneidae
- Genus: Parawixia
- Species: P. dehaani

Binomial name
- Parawixia dehaani (Doleschall, 1859)

Synonyms
- Epeira dehaani Doleschall, 1859 (as E. dehaanii); Epeira spectabilis Doleschall, 1859; Epeira caputlupi Doleschall, 1859; Epeira bogoriensis Doleschall, 1859; Epeira kandarensis Thorell, 1877; Epeira submucronata Simon, 1887; Epeira caestata Thorell, 1890; Aranea dehaani (Doleschall, 1859); Araneus caputlupi (Doleschall, 1859); Araneus dehaani (Doleschall, 1859); Araneus submucronatus (Simon, 1887)

= Parawixia dehaani =

Species of spider

Parawixia dehaani, known in Australia as the abandoned-web orb-weaver, is a species of orb weaver spider from the family Araneidae which is widely distributed in Australasia and eastern Asia. It is common in gardens, leading to it sometimes being known by the name common garden spider. The specific name is sometimes spelt dehaanii.

== Description ==
The female Parawixia dehaani is a large, dark brown spider with variable patterns on the abdomen. The most noticeable field characteristic is the triangular abdomen having corners with sharp spikes.

== Phylogeny ==
=== Close relatives ===
It has a close relative Parawixia bistriata, which is mainly found in South America.

== Distribution ==
The species is found from India to the Philippines, New Guinea and Australia. It has also been recorded in Pakistan.

== Habitat ==
Parawixia dehaani is found in gardens, disturbed areas and nearby bushland.

== Biology ==
Parawaixia dehaani is nocturnal and feeds mainly on moths. During the day the spider shelters under a leaf in the vegetation. It builds a vertical orb web with an open hub, which often looks damaged, with sections missing, hence the Australian common name, abandoned-web orb-weaver. When disturbed the spiders falls to the ground and plays dead with its legs retracted. Bats have been recorded as being captured by this spider.
