= Tawakoni (disambiguation) =

== People ==
- Tawakoni tribe, a Native American tribe from Oklahoma and Texas

== Places ==
- East Tawakoni, Texas
- Lake Tawakoni, Texas
- Lake Tawakoni State Park, in Wills Point, Texas
- West Tawakoni, Texas, a reservoir east of Dallas

== Other ==
- USS Tawakoni (ATF-114), a Fleet Ocean Tug in US Navy, 1944 to 1978
