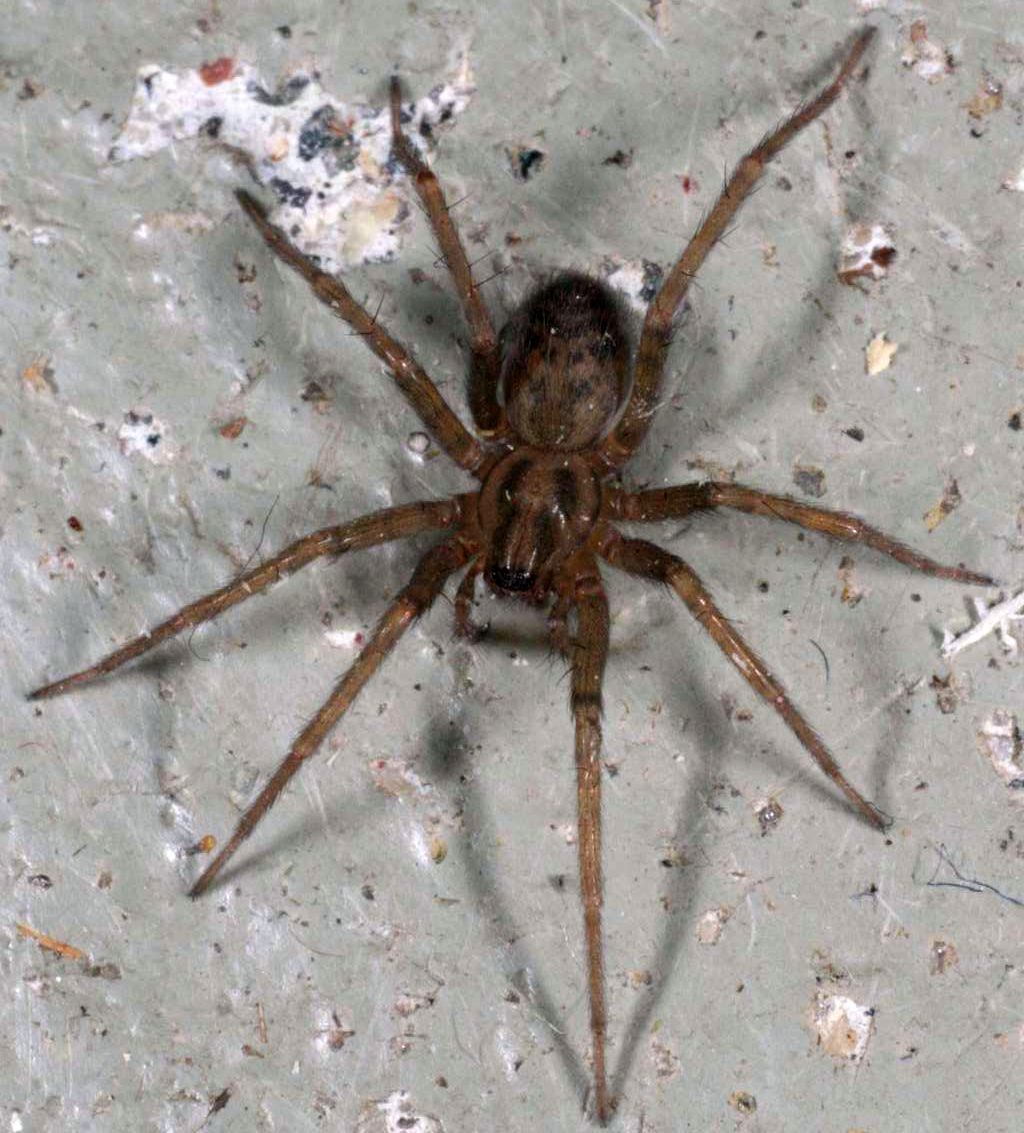
- Female
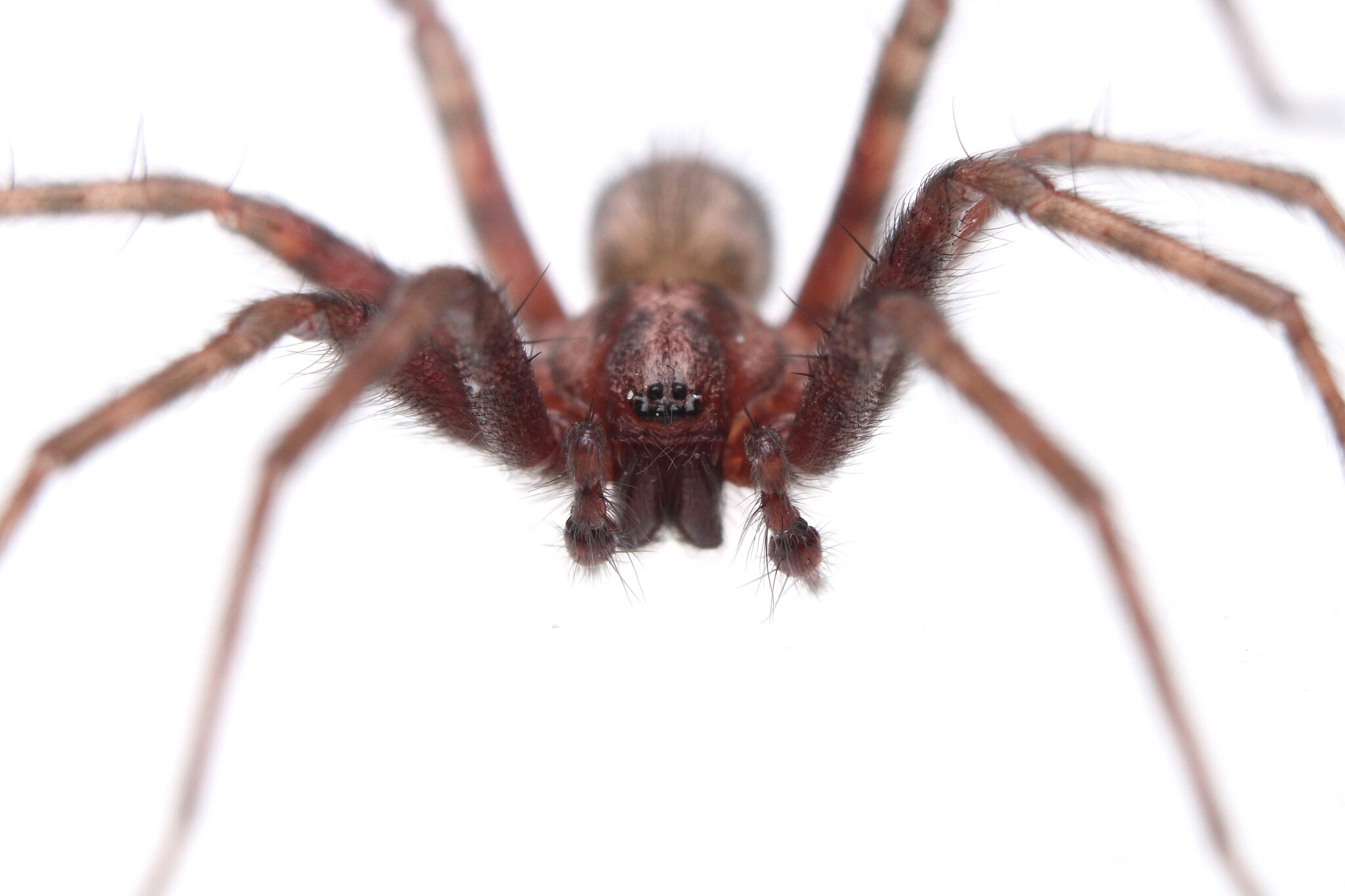
- Male

Scientific classification
- Kingdom: Animalia
- Phylum: Arthropoda
- Subphylum: Chelicerata
- Class: Arachnida
- Order: Araneae
- Infraorder: Araneomorphae
- Family: Agelenidae
- Genus: Tegenaria
- Species: T. domestica

Binomial name
- Tegenaria domestica (Clerck, 1757)

Synonyms
Synonym list
- Araneus domesticus Clerck, 1757
- Aranea domestica (Clerck, 1757)
- Aranea derhamii Scopoli, 1763
- Aranea longipes Fuesslin, 1775
- Aranea flava Martini & Goeze, 1778
- Aranea tomentosa Martini & Goeze, 1778
- Aranea annulata Martini & Goeze, 1778
- Aranea civilis Walckenaer, 1802
- Tegenaria civilis (Walckenaer, 1802)
- Arachne familiaris Audouin, 1826
- Agelena civilis (Walckenaer, 1802)
- Tegenaria scalaris Krynicki, 1837
- Tegenaria longipes (Fuesslin, 1775)
- Agelena familiaris (Audouin, 1826)
- Philoica civilis (Walckenaer, 1802)
- Tegenaria cretica Lucas, 1853
- Drassina ochracea Grube, 1861
- Nyssa familiaris (Audouin, 1826)
- Tegenaria dubia Blackwall, 1864
- Tegenaria testacea Simon, 1870
- Tegenaria fontium Simon, 1875
- Tegenaria detestabilis O. Pickard-Cambridge, 1877
- Tegenaria modesta Keyserling, 1878
- Tegenaria derhamii (Scopoli, 1763)
- Coelotes calcaratus Keyserling, 1887
- Coelotes plumarius Bishop & Crosby, 1926
- Tegenaria derhami (Scopoli, 1763)
- Mevianops fragilis Mello-Leitão, 1941
- Coelotes amygdaliformis Zhu & Wang, 1991
- Tegenaria domesticoides Schmidt & Piepho, 1994
- Draconarius amygdaliformis (Zhu & Wang, 1991)

= Tegenaria domestica =

Domestic house spider

Species of spider

The spider species Tegenaria domestica, commonly known as the barn funnel weaver in North America and the domestic house spider in Europe, is a member of the funnel-web family Agelenidae.

== Distribution and habitat ==
Domestic house spiders range nearly worldwide. Their global distribution encompasses Europe, North Africa, parts of the Middle East and Central Asia. They have been introduced to the Americas, Australia, and New Zealand.

In Europe, they are found as far north as Scandinavia to as far south as Greece and the Mediterranean sea. It is recorded in the checklist of Danish spider species.

In North America, the species is found from as far north as maritime Canada down to the Southern United States.

== Appearance ==
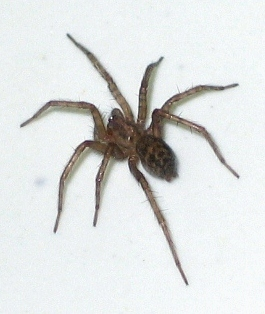
Male

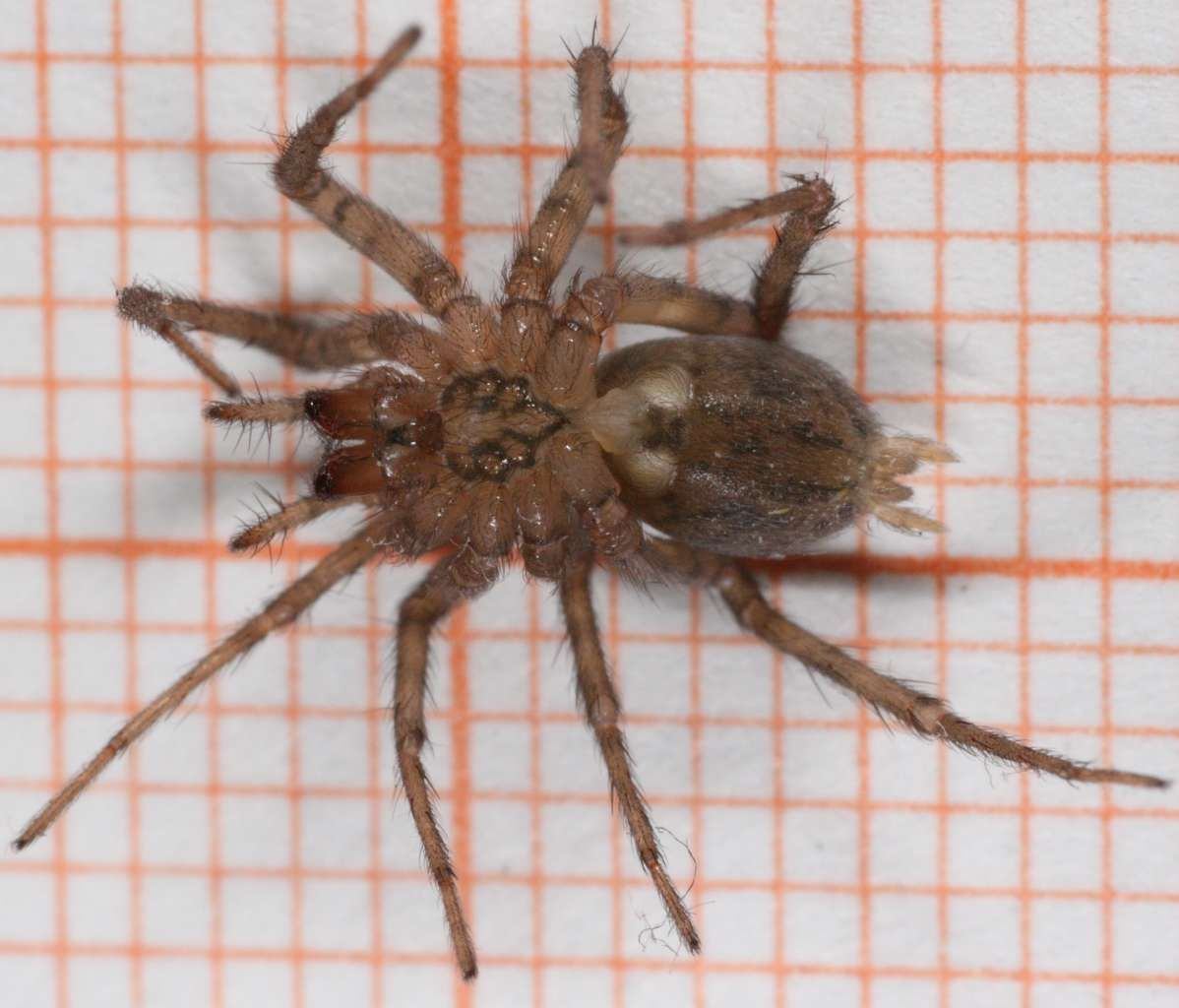
Underside of female with long spinnerets

Domestic house spiders possess elongated bodies with a somewhat flattened cephalothorax and straight abdomen. Their body/legs ratio is typically 50-60%.

T. domestica is one of the smaller species in the genus Tegenaria. Female body length averages between 7.5 and 11.5 mm (0.30 and 0.45 in) and male body length averages between 6 and 9 mm (0.24 and 0.35 in).

It was previously thought to be a close relative of the Giant House Spider, which has since been moved to the genus Eratigena and has been separated into three distinct species.

Males are usually distinguished from females by having longer, more agile legs, bloated pedipalps and elongated abdomen. Other distinctions are strictly behavioral.

The coloring of an adult T. domestica is typically dark orange to brown or beige (maybe even grayish), with a common characteristic of striped legs and two dull, black, longitudinal stripes on the cephalothorax. The abdomen is mottled in brown, beige, and grey and has a pattern of chevrons running lengthwise across the top (similar to an argyle pattern).

== Behavior ==
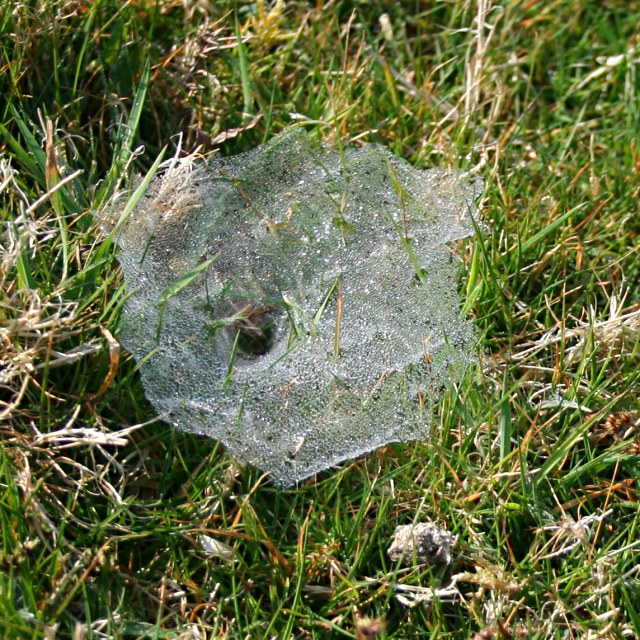
The classic funnel web radiating from the spider's retreat

Barn funnel weavers are active and agile hunters, relying on both their vision and movement speed as well as web mechanisms. Six out of eight of their eyes are sighted forward, allowing them to detect movement and focus in on prey items. These spiders are also known to be photosensitive, i.e. moving to or fleeing from the light, depending on situations.

Like many agelenids, barn funnel weavers are very precise in their movements. Instead of following a continuous gait pattern, they usually move in short intervals, stopping several times before deciding where to head next.

This spider builds a funnel-shaped web to catch its prey. It usually consists of a multitude of stressed silk threads spun over a flat surface, with a funnel-like structure reaching back into a corner or sheltered area. The spider sits at the back of the funnel shape, waiting for prey to disturb the web. When the silk threads in the web are disturbed, vibrations are sent to the spider, notifying the spider there is prey at the mouth of the funnel. The spider will rush out and attack the prey item, dragging it back to the back of the funnel to consume its meal. These webs can become quite large if undisturbed.

T. domestica was not known to form colonies until a web over 100 square metres (1,100 sq ft) built by thousands of individuals and shared by Prinerigone vagans was found in the Sulfur Cave between Greece and Albania. The discoverers hypothesize that the darkness and size difference allow P. vagans not to be predated by the larger T. domestica. The colony is sustained by an abundance of chemoautotrophic bacteria and its predators.

== Life cycle ==
Young T. domestica spiders hatch from the egg sac and grow to maturity within a year. Male numbers peak in the summer months of June and July, indicating mating typically occurs during this time. The males usually die in autumn soon after mating and rarely live for over a year. As with most spiders, males of the species are often consumed by the females after mating. Females regularly survive the winter and into the next year, provided they find a suitable sheltered area to winter, and may produce a number of egg sacs. Females that dwell indoors typically live for over one or two years on the same web, with some T. domestica females reportedly surviving for as long as seven years in rarely disturbed and temperate places (attics, basement or cellar parts, storage rooms, etc.).

== Defense mechanisms ==
T. domestica is not a particularly aggressive species and will often retreat when confronted. As long as its web is undisturbed, the spider will usually retreat to the funnel tip and stop responding to any movement whatsoever. If the web is attacked and partially destroyed, the spider will attempt to flee the area or may huddle its body into a ball against the wall or some other nearby object. To usher the spider into a container for removal, place the open end in front of the spider and use the container lid if so equipped or a similar object to push or corral the spider from behind. Since a spider's first reflex after being disturbed from the rear is to move forward, usually the spider will advance into the container placed in front of it.

Tegenaria species rarely bite. If they do it will be in self-defense, and the bite is unlikely to break the skin.
