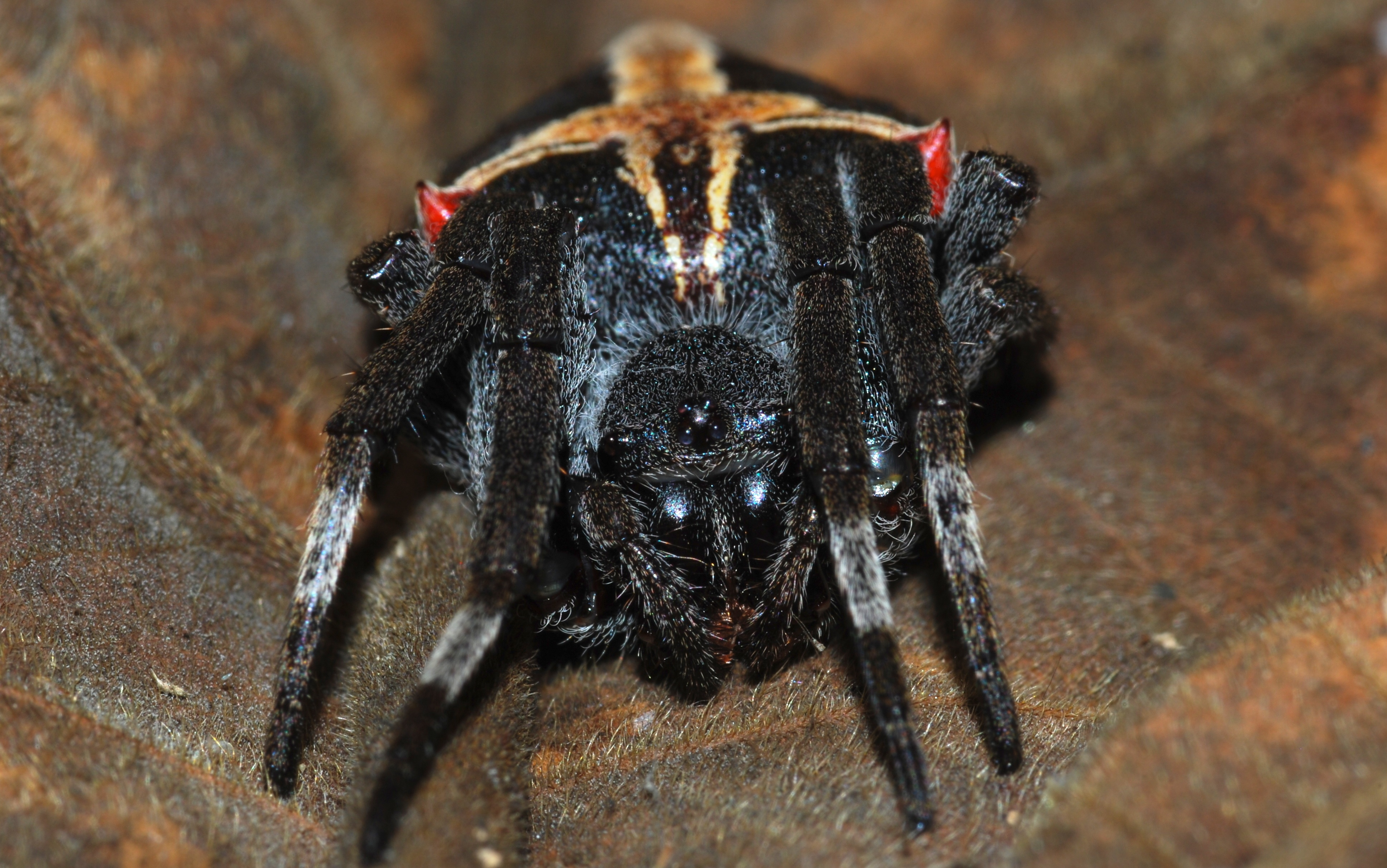
- Abandoned web orb-weaver (P. dehaani) in Taman Negara National Park, Malaysia

Scientific classification
- Kingdom: Animalia
- Phylum: Arthropoda
- Subphylum: Chelicerata
- Class: Arachnida
- Order: Araneae
- Infraorder: Araneomorphae
- Family: Araneidae
- Genus: Parawixia; F. O. Pickard-Cambridge, 1904

Type species
- P. destricta (O. Pickard-Cambridge, 1889)

Species
- 29, see text

= Parawixia =

Genus of spiders

Parawixia is a genus of orb-weaver spiders first described by F. O. Pickard-Cambridge in 1904. Most species are found in the Neotropics, but one species, Parawixia dehaani, is found in Australasia and tropical Asia as far west as India.

== Natural history ==
Parawixia audax, one of the better known species, makes a large loose web, placing itself either in the center with its head down or in a retreat created from a rolled-leaf. This species builds webs 1 to 2 metres (3 ft 3 in to 6 ft 7 in) above the ground, but there are likely many more species further up in the canopy that are rarely collected by usual means.

Parawixia bistriata builds its webs much higher from the ground, frequently found on telephone poles. It is known to be social, and all individuals in a colony are of the same age and size. During the day, they share a retreat where they cluster together.

== Species ==
As of November 2026 it contains 29 species:

- Parawixia acapulco Levi, 1992 – Mexico
- Parawixia audax (Blackwall, 1863) – Colombia to Argentina
- Parawixia barbacoas Levi, 1992 – Colombia, Ecuador
- Parawixia bistriata (Rengger, 1836) – Brazil, Bolivia, Paraguay, Argentina
- Parawixia carimagua (Levi, 1991) – Colombia
- Parawixia casa Levi, 1992 – Colombia
- Parawixia chubut Levi, 2001 – Chile, Argentina
- Parawixia dehaani (Doleschall, 1859) – India to Philippines, New Guinea
  - Parawixia d. octopunctigera (Strand, 1911) – Papua New Guinea (New Ireland)
- Parawixia destricta (O. Pickard-Cambridge, 1889) – Mexico to Panama
- Parawixia divisoria Levi, 1992 – Ecuador, Peru, Brazil, Bolivia
- Parawixia guatemalensis (O. Pickard-Cambridge, 1889) – Mexico, Guatemala
- Parawixia honesta (O. Pickard-Cambridge, 1899) – Mexico
- Parawixia hoxaea (O. Pickard-Cambridge, 1889) – Guatemala to Panama
- Parawixia hypocrita (O. Pickard-Cambridge, 1889) – Guatemala to Brazil
- Parawixia inopinata Camargo, 1950 – Brazil
- Parawixia kochi (Taczanowski, 1873) – Trinidad to Brazil, Guyana, French Guiana
- Parawixia maldonado Levi, 1992 – Peru
- Parawixia matiapa Levi, 1992 – Trinidad, Colombia, Peru, Brazil
- Parawixia monticola (Keyserling, 1892) – Brazil
- Parawixia nesophila Chamberlin & Ivie, 1936 – Costa Rica, Panama
- Parawixia ouro Levi, 1992 – Peru, Brazil
- Parawixia rigida (O. Pickard-Cambridge, 1889) – Guatemala to Panama
- Parawixia rimosa (Keyserling, 1892) – Costa Rica to Bolivia
- Parawixia tarapoa Levi, 1992 – Ecuador, Peru, Brazil
- Parawixia tomba Levi, 1992 – Peru, Brazil
- Parawixia tredecimnotata F. O. Pickard-Cambridge, 1904 – Mexico to Belize, Greater Antilles
- Parawixia undulata (Keyserling, 1892) – Brazil, Uruguay, Argentina
- Parawixia velutina (Taczanowski, 1878) – Colombia to Argentina
