= Sulfur Cave =

Cave in Greece and Albania

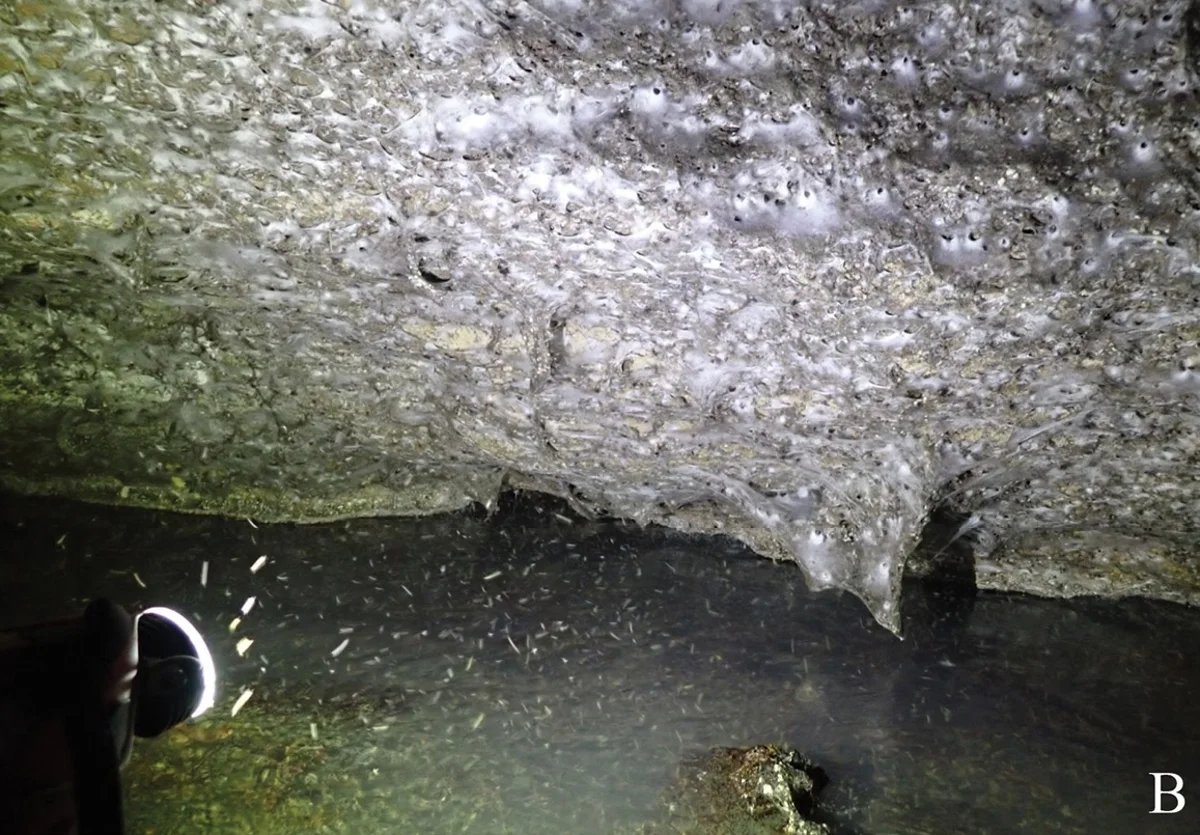
- The world's largest spiderweb in the Sulfur Cave, illuminated by lights
- Interactive map of Sulfur Cave
- Location: Konitsa, Greece; Kolonjë, Albania
- Coordinates: 40.0961°N 20.6789°E
- Length: 1,710 feet (520 m)
- Discovery: 2022
- Geology: Sulfuric acid
- Entrances: 1

The Sulfur Cave is a cave on the border between Greece and Albania, and an example of the broader phenomenon of sulfuric acid caves. It is known for containing the first reported super-colony of spiders. The cave was discovered in 2022 by cavers who then reported their discovery to scientists. It is over 97 square metres (1,040 sq ft) in size and contains over 111,000 spiders of the species Tegenaria domestica and Prinerigone vagans. This is the first documented example of these two species of spider constructing communal webs.

Sulfur acid caves are an extreme environment, being completely dark and enriched with hydrogen sulfide gas, which is toxic to most organisms. Researchers were able to determine that the spiders in the cave rely on a food chain that starts with sulfur-oxidizing microbes. Additional genetic analysis also showed that the species inhabiting the cave are evolving into new species. It is hypothesised that genetic isolation and an abundant food supply led the spiders to develop this previously unknown colonial behaviour.

T. domestica would normally prey on P. vagans. The lack of light and the amount of food available in the cave are considered the two main reasons why this does not happen. The ecosystem is fueled by sulfur-oxidizing microbes, which are in turn eaten by aquatic larvae of invertebrates that the spiders use as a food source.
