= Lake Tawakoni State Park =

State park in Texas, United States

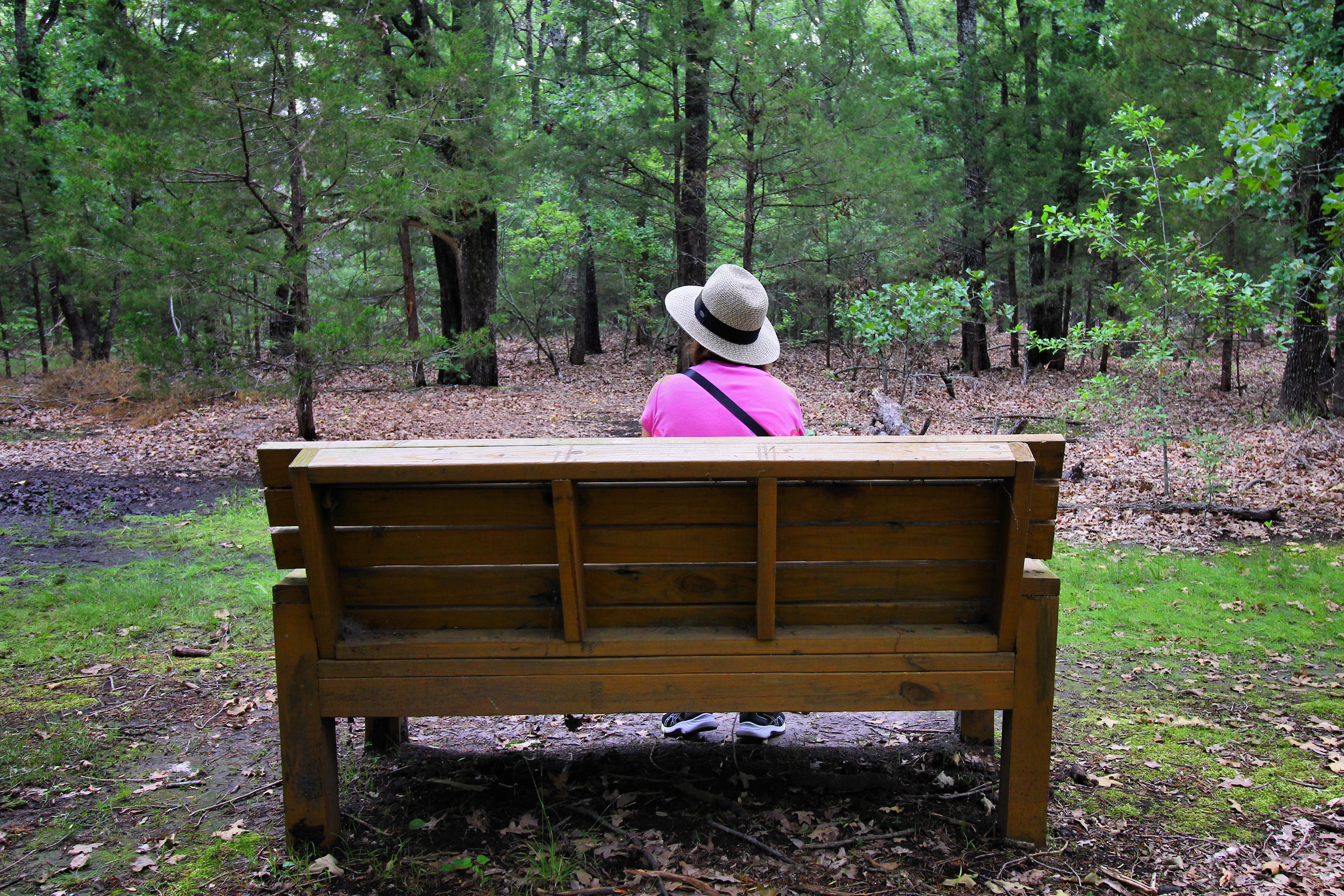
- Taking in the forest at Lake Tawakoni State Park
- Interactive map of Lake Tawakoni State Park
- Location: Hunt County, Texas
- Nearest city: Wills Point
- Coordinates: 32°50′55″N 96°00′00″W
- Area: 376.3 acres (152.3 ha)
- Elevation: 430 feet (130 m)
- Established: 2002
- Visitors: 101,724 (in 2025)
- Governing body: Texas Parks and Wildlife Department
- Website: Official site

Lake Tawakoni State Park (/təˈwɑːkəni/ tə-WAH-kə-nee) is a 376.3 acres (152.3 ha) state park located in Hunt County, Texas, United States, 11.2 miles (18.0 km) north of Wills Point. It is on the south central shore of Lake Tawakoni, a 37,879-acre reservoir on the Sabine River. The park opened in 2002 under a lease agreement with the Sabine River Authority. The Texas Parks and Wildlife Department manages the park.

== History ==
Constructed in 1960, the lake is named after the Tawakoni Native American tribe, who used to live in the area. It was built to provide a source of water for the Dallas area.

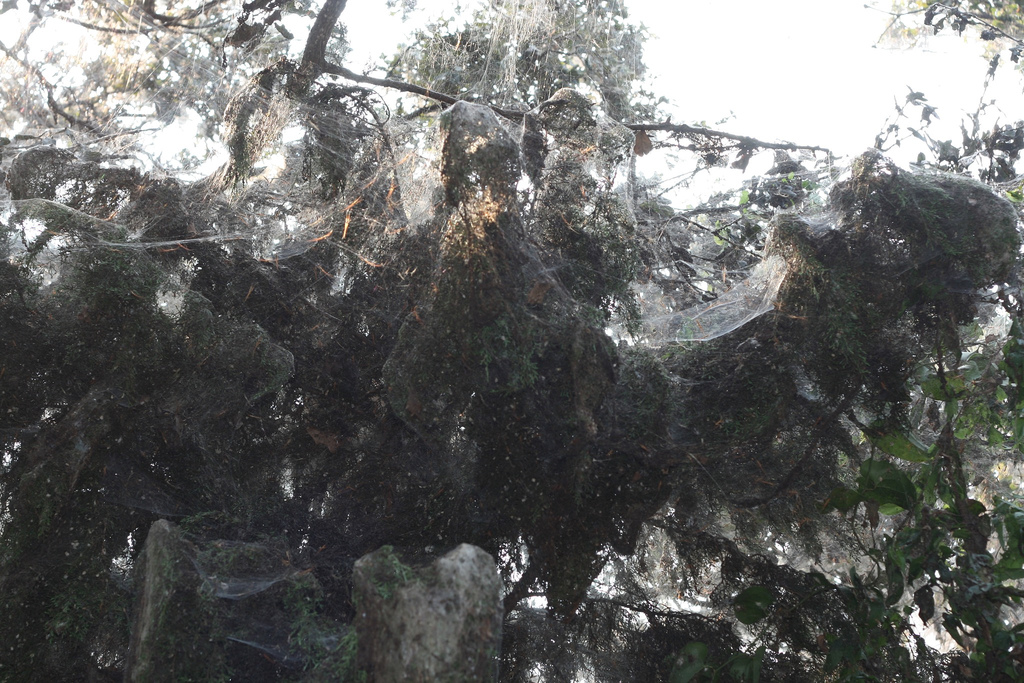
The communal spider web at Lake Tawakoni State Park

The park came to media attention in 2007, because of a giant communal spider web on the premises of the park. The web was mostly the work of thousands of long-jawed orb weavers (Tetragnatha guatemalensis), but other spider species were found to have also joined in.

On January 22, 2009, a fire swept through the park, burning approximately 125 acres (51 ha) of park property.

== Nature ==
=== Animals ===
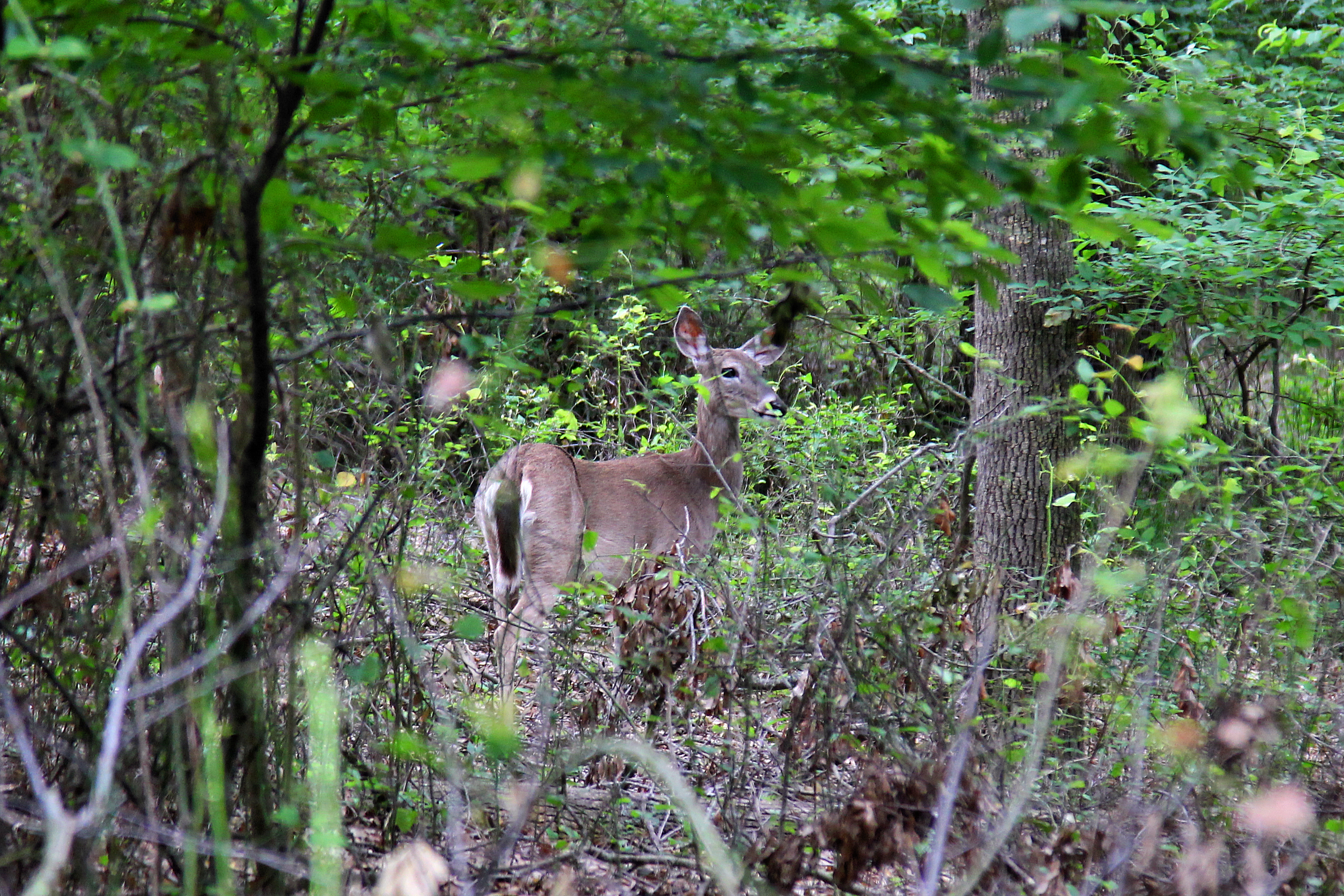
A white-tailed deer in Lake Tawakoni State Park.

Lake Tawakoni State Park is teeming with wildlife. Animal species seen in the park include red and gray fox, bobcat, coyote, Virginia opossum, common raccoon, American beaver, eastern fox squirrel, Mexican long-nosed armadillo, white-tailed deer, red-eared slider, pond slider, diamondback watersnake and several species of frogs and toads. Additionally, birders have identified more than 200 species of birds in the park like eastern bluebird, killdeer, northern cardinal, downy woodpecker, and black vulture. The lake holds many different species of fish such as striped bass, white bass, largemouth bass and crappie but is noted for its blue catfish.

=== Plants ===
Bur oak and cedar elm dominate the forest of Lake Tawakoni State Park. Large shrubs Osage orange and farkleberry along with Virginia creeper and poison ivy are in the understory.

== Activities ==
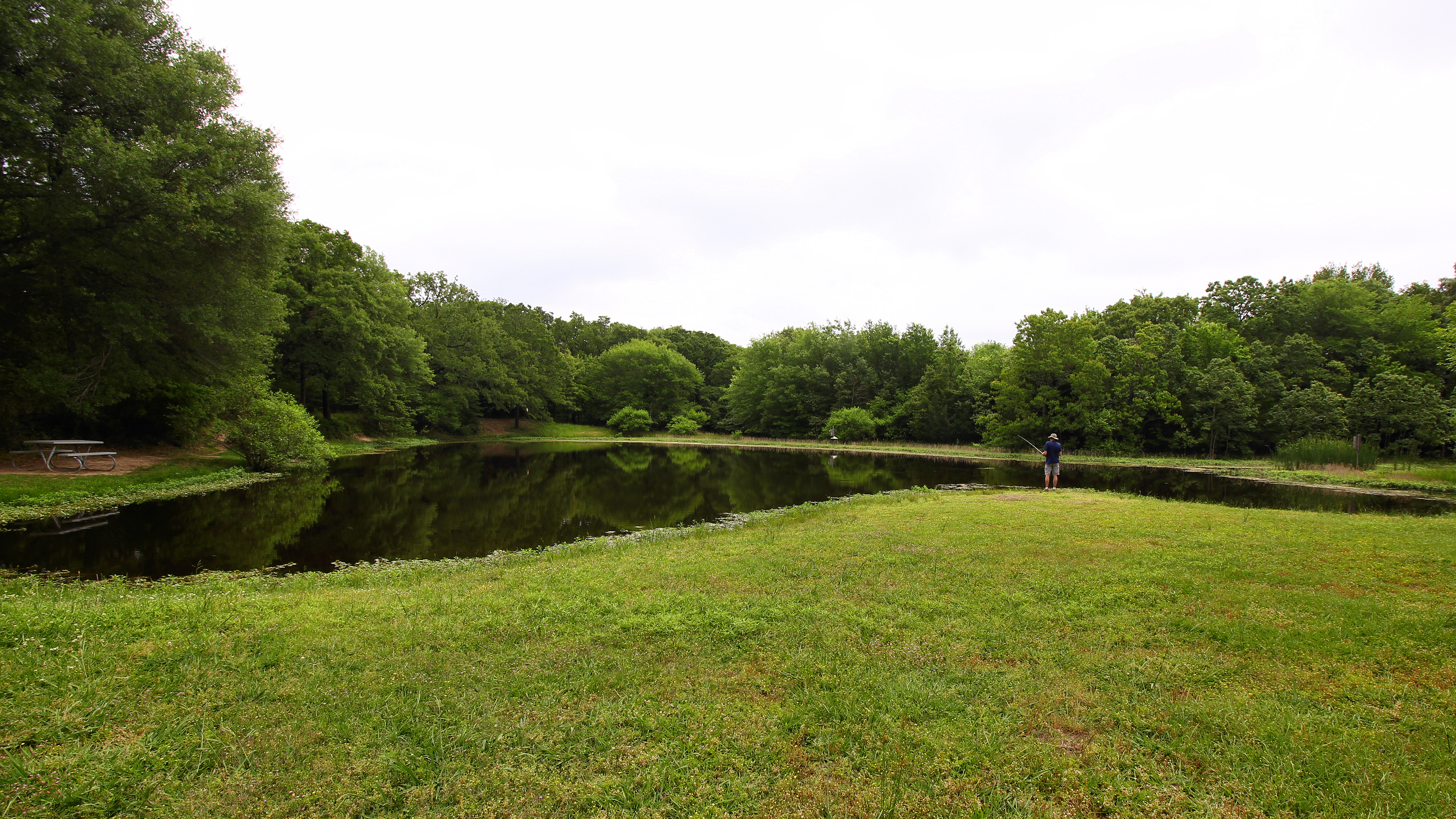
Pear Trees Pond is perfect for fishing.

The park offers a variety of outdoor activities including boating, fishing, swimming, hiking, mountain biking, birding and geocaching. There are also campsites available for tents and recreational vehicles. There are about five miles of trails to explore by foot or mountain bike.

== See also ==
- List of Texas state parks
