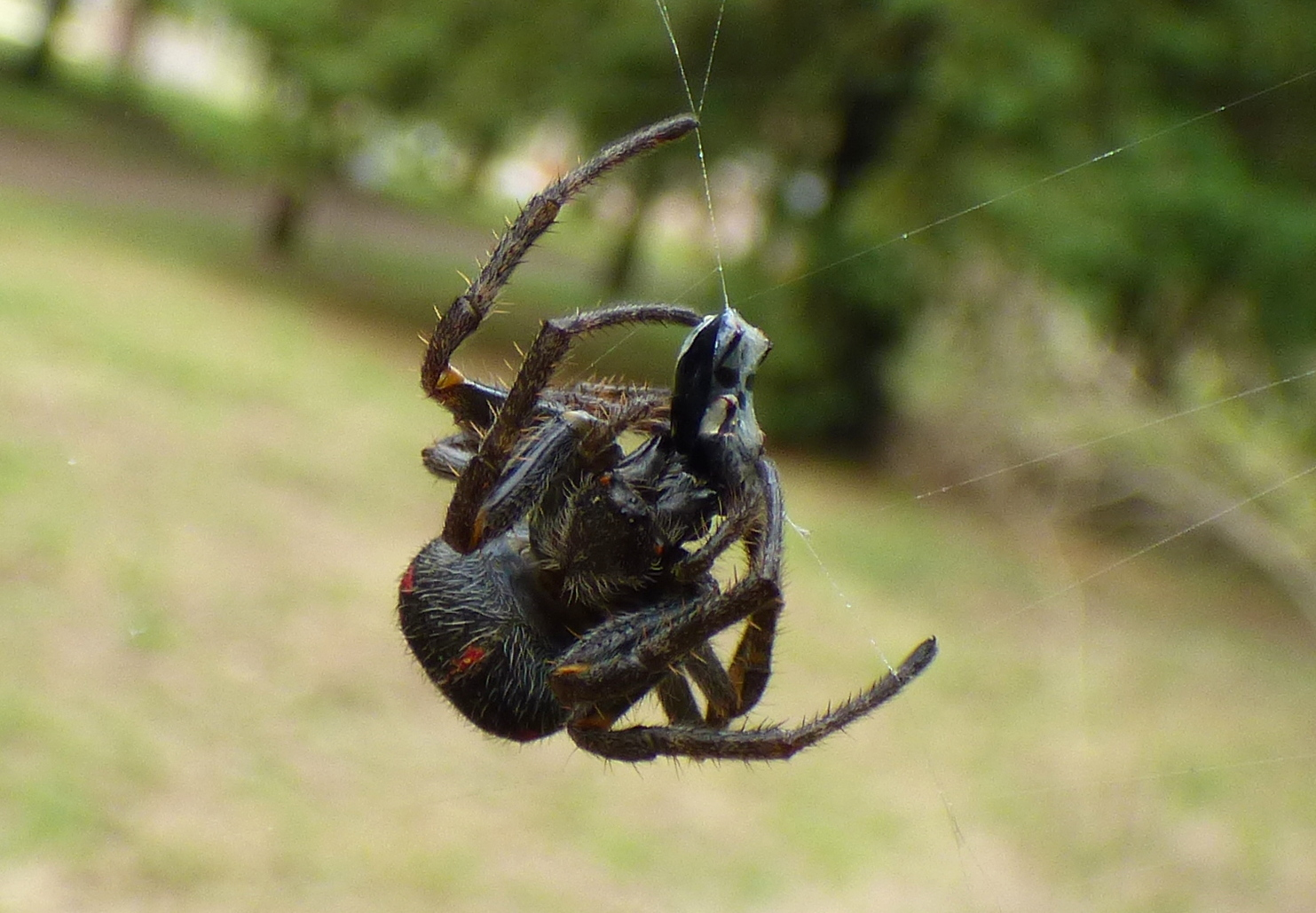

Scientific classification
- Kingdom: Animalia
- Phylum: Arthropoda
- Subphylum: Chelicerata
- Class: Arachnida
- Order: Araneae
- Infraorder: Araneomorphae
- Family: Araneidae
- Genus: Parawixia
- Species: P. bistriata

Binomial name
- Parawixia bistriata (Rengger, 1836)

= Parawixia bistriata =

Species of arachnid

Parawixia bistriata is a spider species found mainly in South America. It is known to have social foraging behavior. Due to its complex social system, it can live in habitats with various resource levels. Recently, its social behavior has been well-studied. Also, this species can collectively change its web structure in response to changes in prey type. They live collectively in web systems and thrive in both dry and wet climates. The size of its body is very small, typically 2 cm (0.8 in) long.

== Description ==
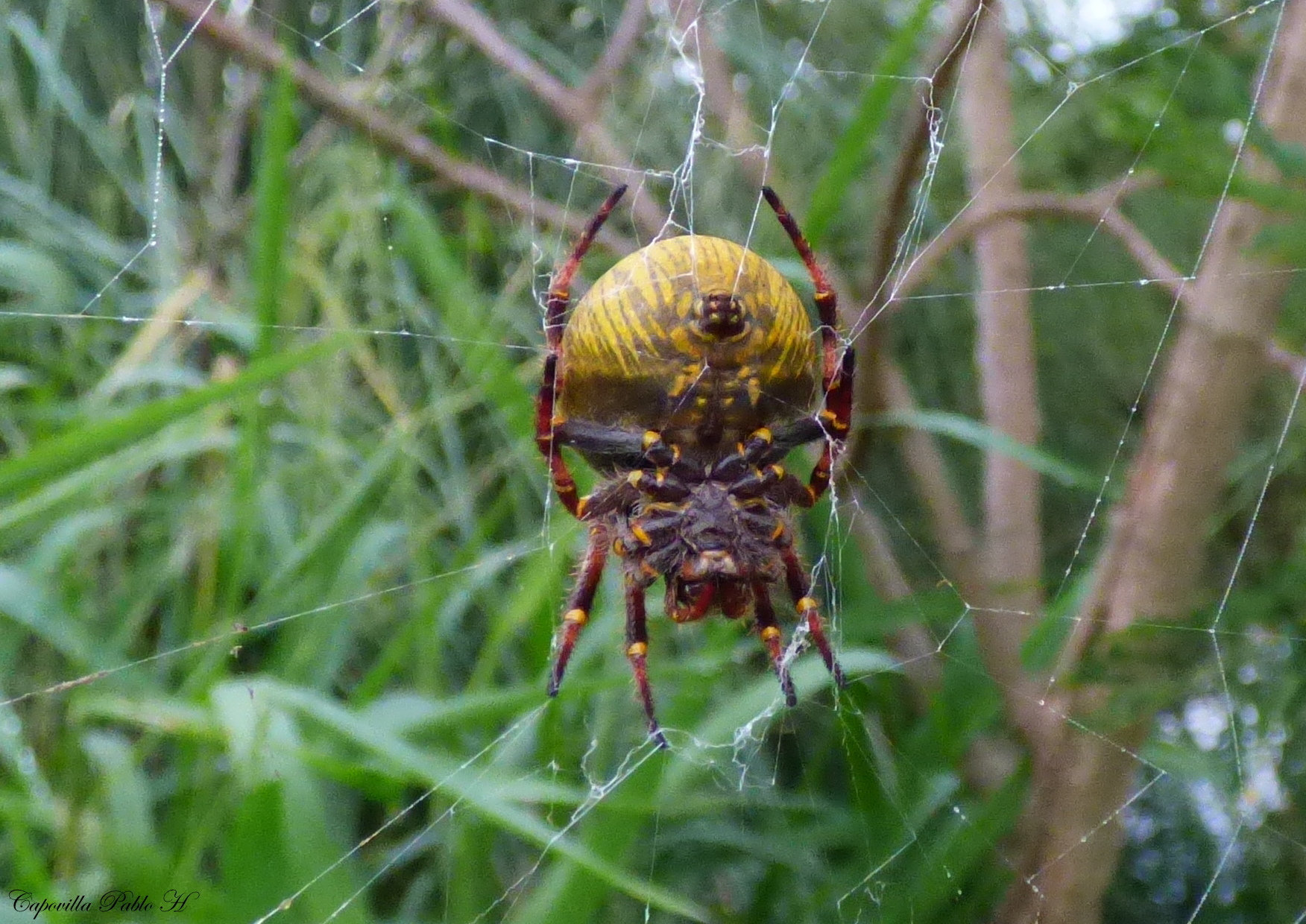
Underside of P. bistriata.

Parawixia bistriata's body color is mainly black. There are some spiders with some small red dots around its abdomen. The legs are short and black as well. Its eyes are very small, almost invisible on the black head. Its abdomen is very large compared to the rest of its body. They live in clusters, so it is easy to spot a group of them in the web system. To an onlooker, they appear to be a large cluster of black clouds on trees and other structures.

== Habitat and distribution ==
P. bistriata is widely spread across South America, where the climate is relatively warm and humid, including Argentina. This species can tolerate many types of habitat, including dry and wet. Their group foraging behavior will adapt to the local resource availability. Therefore, it offers excellent flexibility to study food shortage stresses on this species. In Argentina, the climate has a clear division between dry and rainy seasons, with dry winters and wet summers. Based on field observations, P. bistriata will encounter food shortages during dry seasons. Group feeding behavior can give more food to developing juveniles.

== Social behavior ==
=== Colony-forming dynamics ===
Colonies form annually. Most of the colony members are spawned from the same egg sac. The maximum size of the colony has been reported to be 500. Upon maturation, members will mate and disperse, laying eggs away from the original colony location. This colony formation pattern is different from other social spiders, which lay eggs in the original colony so that the colony can exist for more than one year.

=== Group feeding ===
During the field study in Argentina, group feeding is observed in most dry sites (83%). However, this number significantly decreased to 31% in wet areas, showing that this species tends to engage in group feeding when food is in scarcity. Also, when the prey size is large, P. bistriata tends to engage in group feeding. Since P. bistriata has a small body size, by feeding in groups they can handle prey much larger than them, avoiding potential injury caused by the prey's resistance. Also, the feed group size is reported to be related to the prey size.

The group feeding behavior is a sequence of events. There are two types of players in the group feeding. One is focal spiders, which are close to the prey trap site on the web. Others are neighboring spiders. First, P. bistriata will either pluck the web or directly approach the prey. Then the focal spider will bite the prey, subduing the prey in minutes. Then neighbors will come and wrap the prey.

The frequency of group feeding depends largely on prey size and the age of group members. Juvenile spiders can gain resource advantage by working in groups, reducing individual silk usage. However, large P. bistriata tend to feed individually. When conflict arises between individuals for food resources, larger body size usually guarantees victory.

=== Bourgeois behavior and conflict within a colony ===
Living in groups sometimes inevitably brings resource competition. Building web requires space, so individuals tend to compete for it. P. bistriata displays bourgeois behavior when individuals occupy a web. Web owners who have space to construct a web will use a bounce behavior to drive off those without a web. Webless P. bistriata in a colony will act as satellites around web owners and try to freeload when prey is trapped on the web. There is a dynamic equilibrium between web owners and webless spiders. It is expected that the benefit as a web occupant and a webless satellite should be similar. Field study has confirmed that there is no significant difference in body weight between P. bistriata with a web (mean = 554 mg, SD = 152 mg, N = 23) and without one (mean = 494 mg, SD = 0.106 mg, N = 19). Also, this bouncing behavior is very effective. Most of the time, the intruder will leave the web immediately. However the intruder can never take over the web owner.

In most spider species, catching prey is usually done by only one spider, so interspecific conflicts are rare. However, it is not the case in Parawixia bistriata, which live in colonies and their webs are very close to each other. So invasion and freeloading is very frequent. The great advantage to dominate preys will give individuals incentives to defend their webs and preys. However, resource dependability states that one individual should only spend energy to resource defense when it is economical to do so. There are many variables at play in a colony living environment, such as resource availability, the number of intruders, and the recurring interactions between individuals. When there are lots of intruders being attracted to large prey, it is almost impossible to monopolize. Therefore conflicts are only observed when there are only a few competitors. Also, conflicts are more likely to happen when the food resource is distributed unevenly. When preys aggregate on certain webs, conflicts are frequent around these sites. Furthermore, when webs are close to each other, and vibrations can be efficiently conducted, both cooperative and antagonistic behaviors are more frequently observed.

=== Freeloading ===
Instead of being a web owner, some P. bistriata choose to be satellites around the webs. Bodyweight data show that the satellite strategy can be equally successful. Early in the night, when there are still some available web construction spaces, P. bistriata will leave the owner’s web if bounced by the owner. It is still likely to find a space and build a new web. However, during late night, it makes sense to freeload when room is scarce. Intruders will then ignore the bounce behavior of the web owner. It has been reported that freeloading is more likely to be successful if the prey size is large.

=== Genetic and environmental effects on group foraging ===
The group living nature of P. bistriata makes it a potential candidate for population genetics studies. Transplants are implemented to study the behavioral plasticity of P. bistriata. The results are different for P. bistriata from resource-rich and resource-poor habitats. Only the individuals from resource-poor habitat showed plasticity, which allowed them to switch from group feeding to individual feeding. Transplants from resource-deficient habitats face highly variable food availability in their native habitats, so they are more likely to respond to environmental change. However, the lack of plasticity for individuals from resource-rich habitats suggests that this adaptation to the environment is due to genomic imprinting.

== Webs ==
=== Construction ===
Web construction of P. bistriata typically takes place after sunset. First, the group of P. bistriata will collectively leave the bivouac and begin construction. It will take about one hour to build the entire web complex. About 13% P. bistriata in a colony will remain web-less. Web owners will reside at the hub of the web, with web-less spiders at peripheral. The entire web complex has a mean width of 10.3 m, with SD 5.9 m. The colony will collectively construct a scaffolding silk, a thick supporting line consisting of several silk strings. Then individual orb-web will be attached to the scaffolding and form an effective system to trap preys. Once finishing foraging, P. bistriata will consume their webs, but not the scaffolding silk, and then they will return to their bivouac.

=== Web design in response to prey type ===
Parawixia bistriata evolves two types of webs, one with fine mesh and one with wide mesh. The timing of each web corresponds to the prey's daily activity. Field study has shown that fine mesh webs are constructed at sunset to capture small Dohrniphora, and wide mesh webs are used to catch termites. Since P. bistriata can recycle their silk proteins by consuming their webs, this variable web design can efficiently adapt to the local availability of food resources.

== Mating ==
Very little is known about the mating behavior of P. bistriata because of its group living lifestyle. P. bistriata colony is very sensitive to artificial perturbations. Attempts to keep them in laboratory observation fail because the colony will immediately scatter when disturbed. To date, only field observations are available about the mating behavior of P. bistriata. Mating occurs both before and after the dispersal of the colony. Two factors influence the mating behavior: the time of reaching maturity and the body weight before mating. A female needs to gain a sufficient body mass before dispersion, while males are still present in the colony for successful reproduction. The males' reproductive success depends on the availability of females in the colony.

== Bites to humans and animals ==
=== Venom ===
The venom of P. bistriata contains Parawixin2 (2-amino-5-ureidopentanamide), which can cause seizures in rats. The compounds purified from spider venoms are not only valuable for clinical treatment development but also offer potential methods to study ion channels in mammalian neuron cells. These toxins are highly specific, so it is possible to target only one ion channel type without effects on others. In this case, P. bistriata's venom can increase glutamate uptake by up to 79%.
