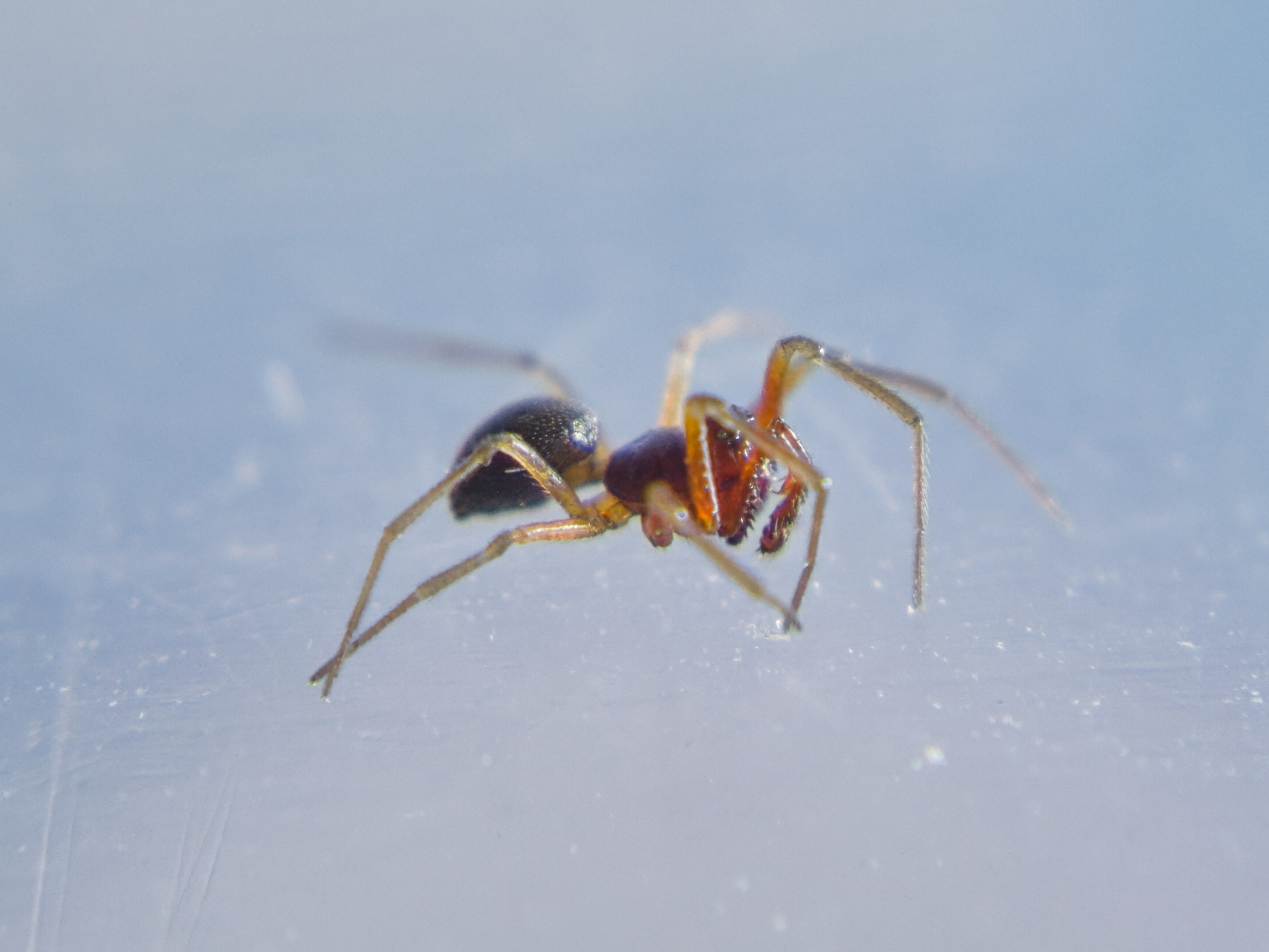
- P. vagans
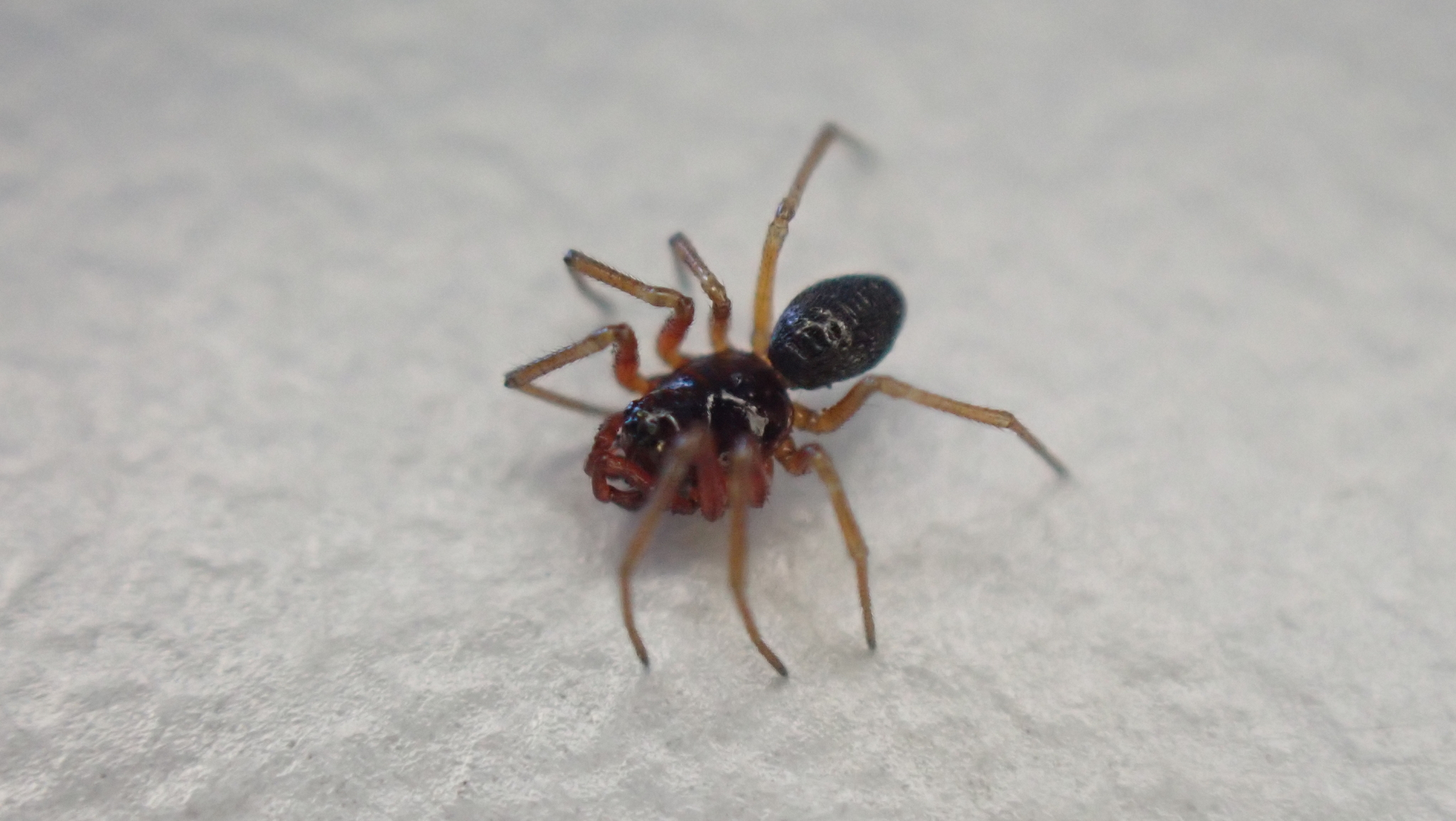
- P. vagans

Scientific classification
- Kingdom: Animalia
- Phylum: Arthropoda
- Subphylum: Chelicerata
- Class: Arachnida
- Order: Araneae
- Infraorder: Araneomorphae
- Family: Linyphiidae
- Genus: Prinerigone; Millidge, 1988

Type species
- P. vagans (Audouin, 1826)

Species
- 3, see text

= Prinerigone =

Genus of spiders

Prinerigone is a genus of sheet weavers that was first described by Alfred Frank Millidge in 1988.

== Species ==
As of October 2025, this genus includes three species and one subspecies:

- Prinerigone aethiopica (Tullgren, 1910) – Cameroon, Kenya, Tanzania
- Prinerigone pigra (Blackwall, 1862) – Madeira
- Prinerigone vagans (Audouin, 1826) – Azores, Europe, North Africa, Turkey, Caucasus, Middle East, Iran, Central Asia, India, China. Introduced to Marion Is. Hawaii (type species)
  - P. v. arabica (Jocqué, 1981) – Saudi Arabia
