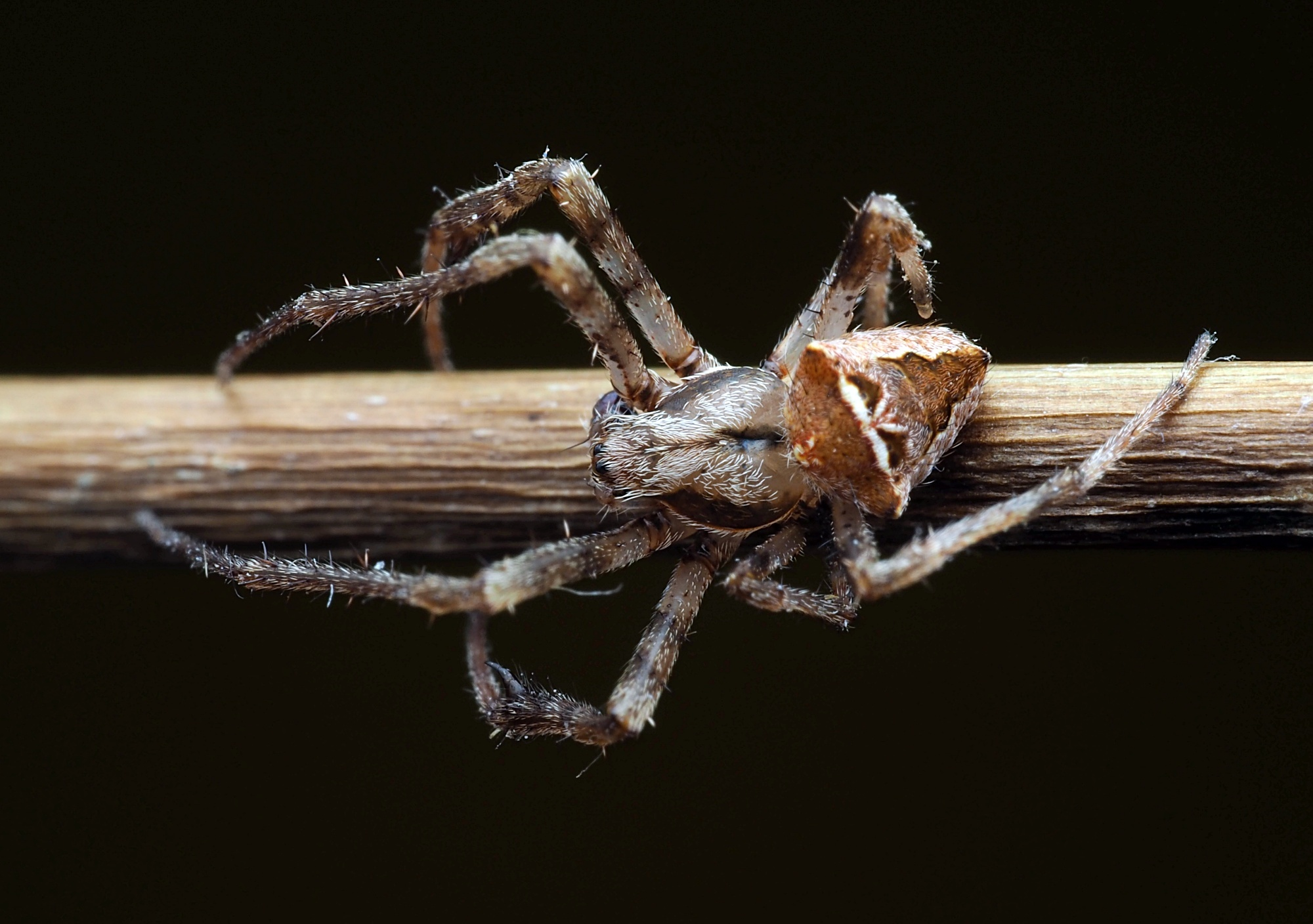
- Novakiella trituberculosa

Scientific classification
- Kingdom: Animalia
- Phylum: Arthropoda
- Subphylum: Chelicerata
- Class: Arachnida
- Order: Araneae
- Infraorder: Araneomorphae
- Family: Araneidae
- Genus: Novakiella; Court & Forster, 1993

= Novakiella =

Genus of spiders

Novakiella is a genus of South Pacific orb-weaver spiders. Previously monotypic containing the single species, Novakiella trituberculosa found in Australia and New Zealand, a second species was recognised in 2021, Novakiella boletus.

== Taxonomy ==
The genus Novakiella was first described by David Court & Forster in 1993 as a replacement name for Novakia. The sole species N. trituberculosa was originally placed in the now obsolete genus Epeira as E. tri-tuberculata. Carl Friedrich Roewer temporarily moved it to Araneus while dissolving this "catch-all" taxon, and it was later placed into its own genus, Novakia, later renamed to Novakiella.

== Distribution ==
N. trituberculosa is native to New Zealand and Australia, while N. boletus is endemic to Australia.

== Species ==
As of November 2026, the World Spider Catalog recognizes two species:

- N. boletus Framenau, Vink, Scharff, Baptista & Castanheira, 2021 – South Australia, New South Wales, Victoria, Tasmania
- N. trituberculosa (Roewer, 1942) – Australia, New Zealand
