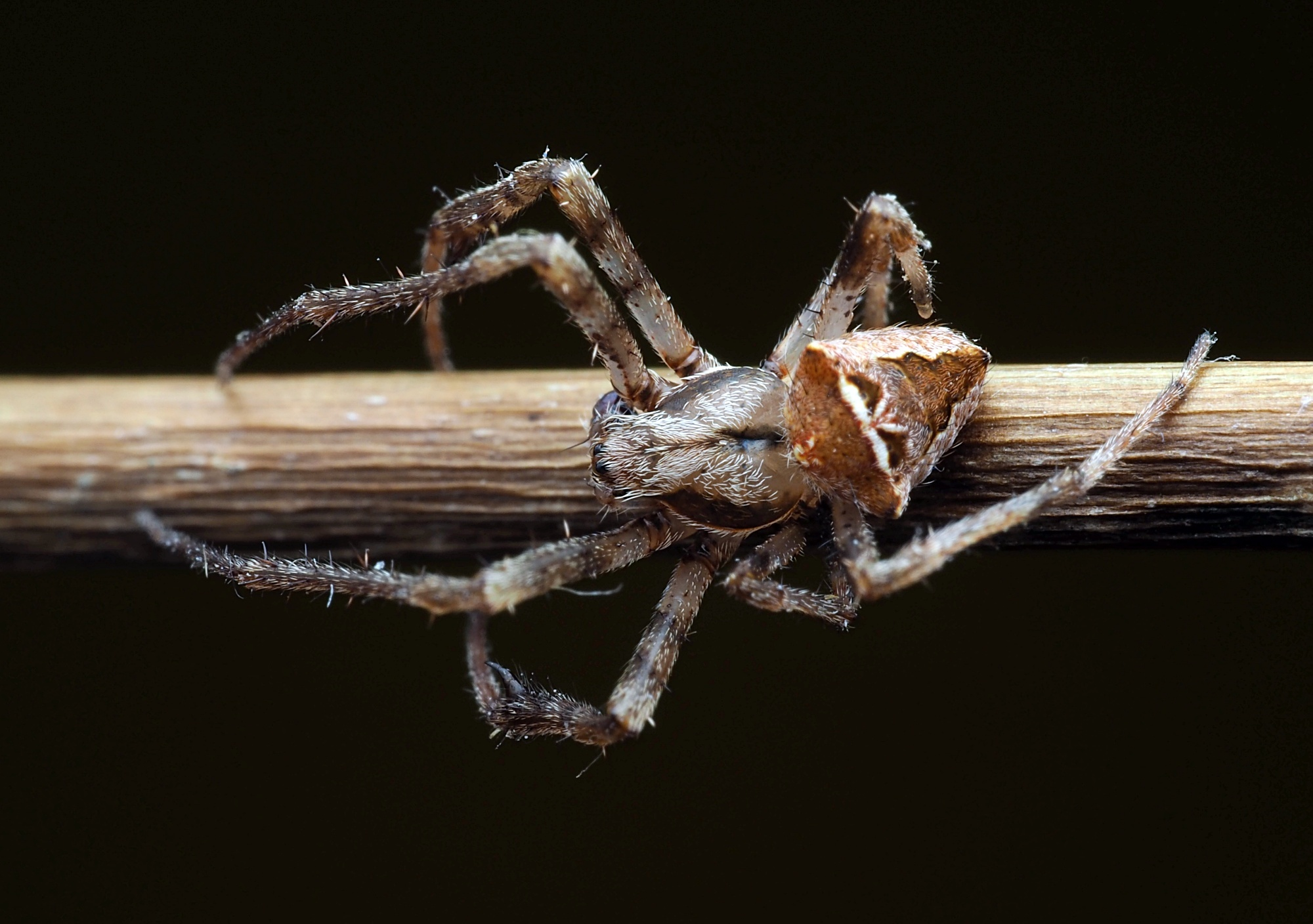
- Novakiella trituberculosa

Conservation status
- Not Threatened (NZ TCS)

Scientific classification
- Domain: Eukaryota
- Kingdom: Animalia
- Phylum: Arthropoda
- Subphylum: Chelicerata
- Class: Arachnida
- Order: Araneae
- Infraorder: Araneomorphae
- Family: Araneidae
- Genus: Novakiella
- Species: N. trituberculosa

Binomial name
- Novakiella trituberculosa (Roewer, 1942)

= Novakiella trituberculosa =

Genus of spiders

Novakiella trituberculosa is a species of South Pacific orb-weaver spiders, found in Australia and New Zealand.

== Taxonomy ==
N. trituberculosa was originally placed in the now obsolete genus Epeira as E. tri-tuberculata. Carl Friedrich Roewer temporarily moved it to Araneus while dissolving this "catch-all" taxon, and it was later placed into its own genus, Novakia, later renamed to Novakiella.

== Description ==
The female is recorded at 9mm in length whereas the male is 7.2mm.

== Distribution ==
This species is native to New Zealand and Australia.

== Conservation status ==
Under the New Zealand Threat Classification System, this species is listed as "Not Threatened" with the qualifier of "Secure Overseas".
