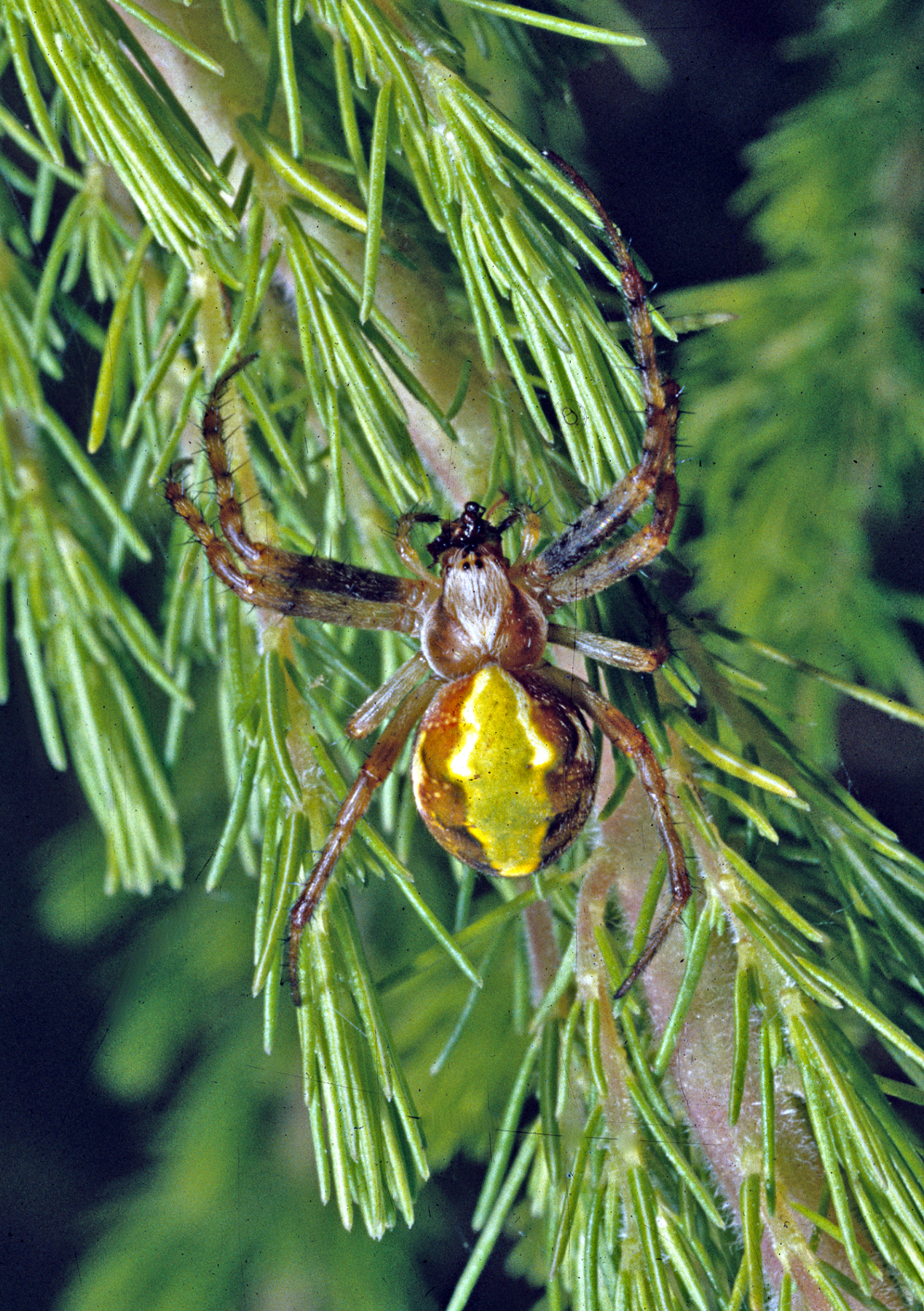

Conservation status
- Not Threatened (NZ TCS)

Scientific classification
- Domain: Eukaryota
- Kingdom: Animalia
- Phylum: Arthropoda
- Subphylum: Chelicerata
- Class: Arachnida
- Order: Araneae
- Infraorder: Araneomorphae
- Family: Araneidae
- Genus: Novaranea
- Species: N. queribunda

Binomial name
- Novaranea queribunda (Keyserling, 1887)

Synonyms
- Epeira queribunda; Epeira quaesita; Epeira laevigata; Epeira powelli; Novaranea laevigata

= Novaranea queribunda =

Species of Arachnida

Novaranea queribunda is a species of Araneidae spider that is endemic to New Zealand.

== Taxonomy ==
This species was described as Epeira queribunda and Epeira quaesita in 1887 by Eugen von Keyserling from female and male specimens. It was most recently revised in 1988. It was renamed as Novaranea queribunda in 2009.

== Description ==
The female is recorded at 4.3mm in length whereas the male is 6.8mm. This species abdomen has a green/yellow band dorsally, but is brown laterally and ventrally.

== Distribution ==
This species is widespread in New Zealand.

== Conservation status ==
Under the New Zealand Threat Classification System, this species is listed as "Not Threatened".
