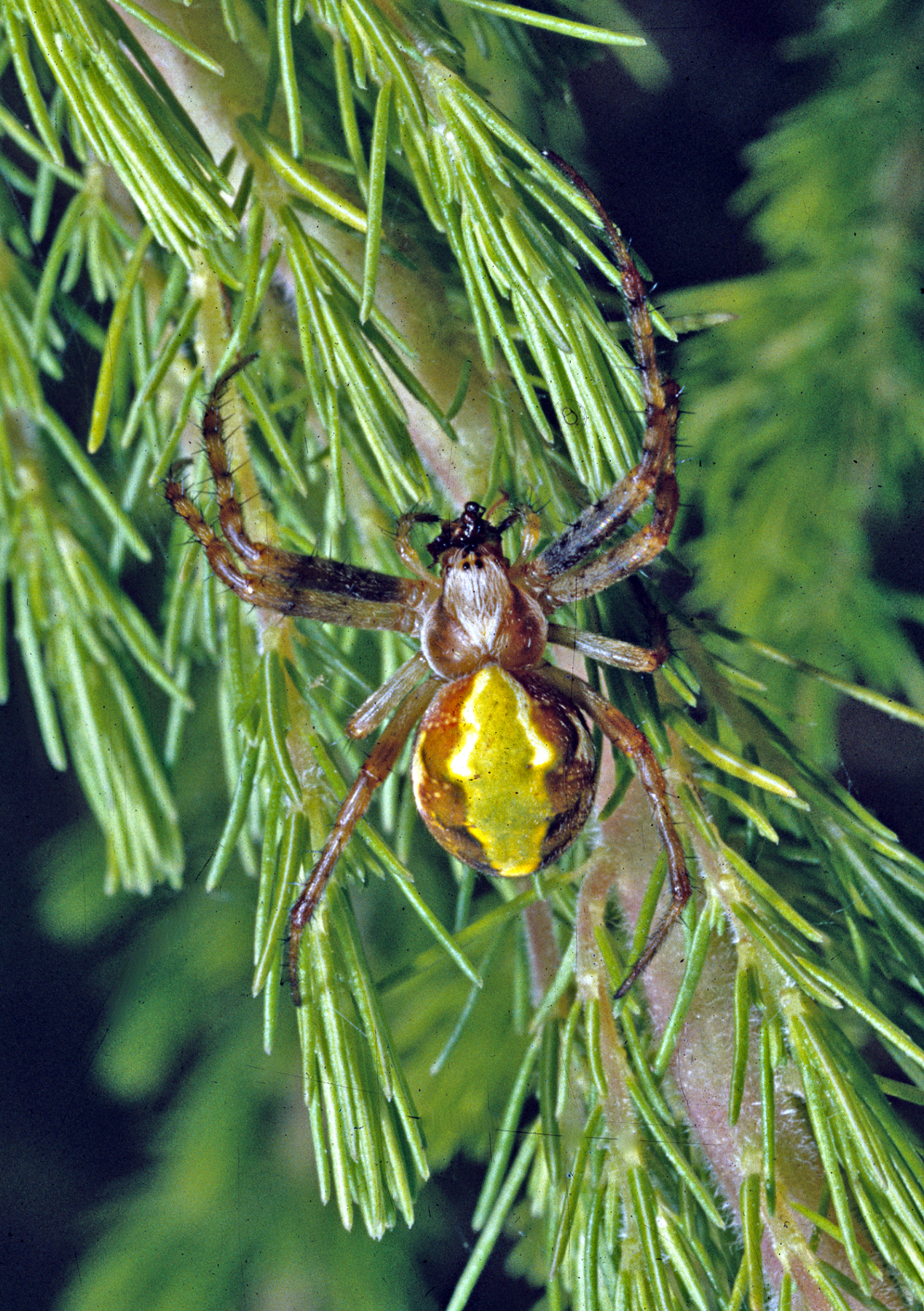
- Novaranea queribunda

Scientific classification
- Kingdom: Animalia
- Phylum: Arthropoda
- Subphylum: Chelicerata
- Class: Arachnida
- Order: Araneae
- Infraorder: Araneomorphae
- Family: Araneidae
- Genus: Novaranea; Court & Forster, 1988

Type species
- N. queribunda (Keyserling, 1887)

Species
- N. courti Framenau, 2011 – Australia (New South Wales, Victoria, Tasmania); N. queribunda (Keyserling, 1887) – New Zealand

= Novaranea =

Genus of spiders

Novaranea is a genus of South Pacific orb-weaver spiders first described by D. J. Court and Raymond Robert Forster in 1988. As of November 2026, it contains only two species.
