= List of Araneidae species: G–M =

This page lists all described species of the spider family Araneidae as of Nov. 5, 2013, that start with letters G through M.

== Galaporella ==
Galaporella Levi, 2009

- Galaporella thaleri Levi, 2009 - Galapagos Is.

== Gasteracantha ==
Gasteracantha Sundevall, 1833

- Gasteracantha aciculata (Pocock, 1899) — New Britain
- Gasteracantha acutispina Dahl, 1914 — Sulawesi
- Gasteracantha audouini Guerin, 1838 — Sumatra, Timor, Amboina, Philippines
- Gasteracantha aureola Mi & Peng, 2013 — China
- Gasteracantha beccarii Thorell, 1877 — Sulawesi
- Gasteracantha biloba (Thorell, 1878) — Moluccas, Amboina
- Gasteracantha cancriformis (Linnaeus, 1758) (type species) — New World
  - Gasteracantha cancriformis gertschi Archer, 1941 — USA
- Gasteracantha clarki Emerit, 1974 — Seychelles
- Gasteracantha clavatrix (Walckenaer, 1841) — Lombok, Sulawesi, Mentawai Islands
- Gasteracantha clavigera Giebel, 1863 — Thailand, Philippines, Sulawesi
- Gasteracantha crucigera Bradley, 1877 — Malaysia, Java, Borneo, New Guinea
- Gasteracantha curvispina (Guerin, 1837) — West, Central Africa, Bioko
- Gasteracantha curvistyla Dahl, 1914 — Togian Islands, near Sulawesi
- Gasteracantha cuspidata C. L. Koch, 1837 — Malaysia, Nicobar Islands, Java
- Gasteracantha dalyi Pocock, 1900 — India, Pakistan
- Gasteracantha diadesmia Thorell, 1887 — India to Philippines
- Gasteracantha diardi (Lucas, 1835) — China, Thailand, Malaysia, Borneo, Sunda Islands
- Gasteracantha doriae Simon, 1877 — Singapore, Sumatra, Borneo
- Gasteracantha falcicornis Butler, 1873 — Africa
- Gasteracantha fasciata Guerin, 1838 — New Guinea, Guam
- Gasteracantha flava Nicolet, 1849 — Chile
- Gasteracantha fornicata (Fabricius, 1775) — Queensland
- Gasteracantha frontata Blackwall, 1864 — India, Myanmar, Thailand, Flores, Borneo
- Gasteracantha gambeyi Simon, 1877 — New Caledonia
- Gasteracantha geminata (Fabricius, 1798) — India, Sri Lanka
- Gasteracantha hasselti C. L. Koch, 1837 — India, China to Moluccas
- Gasteracantha hecata (Walckenaer, 1841) — Philippines
- Gasteracantha interrupta Dahl, 1914 — Lombok, Sulawesi
- Gasteracantha irradiata (Walckenaer, 1841) — Thailand to Philippines, Sulawesi
- Gasteracantha janopol Barrion & Litsinger, 1995 — Philippines
- Gasteracantha kuhli C. L. Koch, 1837 — India to Japan, Philippines
- Gasteracantha lepelletieri (Guerin, 1825) — Sumatra to Philippines, New Guinea
- Gasteracantha lunata Guerin, 1838 — Timor, Moluccas, New Caledonia
- Gasteracantha martensi Dahl, 1914 — Sumatra
- Gasteracantha mediofusca (Doleschall, 1859) — Java, New Guinea
- Gasteracantha mengei Keyserling, 1864 — Malaysia, Sumatra, Borneo
- Gasteracantha metallica (Pocock, 1898) — Solomon Islands
- Gasteracantha milvoides Butler, 1873 — Central, East, Southern Africa
- Gasteracantha notata Kulczynski, 1910 — New Britain
- Gasteracantha panisicca Butler, 1873 — Myanmar to Philippines, Java
- Gasteracantha parangdiadesmia Barrion & Litsinger, 1995 — Philippines
- Gasteracantha pentagona (Walckenaer, 1841) — New Ireland, New Britain
  - Gasteracantha pentagona anirica Strand, 1915 — Bismarck Archipel
- Gasteracantha picta (Thorell, 1892) — Singapore
- Gasteracantha quadrispinosa O. P.-Cambridge, 1879 — New Guinea, Queensland
- Gasteracantha recurva Simon, 1877 — Philippines
- Gasteracantha regalis Butler, 1873 — New Hebrides
- Gasteracantha remifera Butler, 1873 — India, Sri Lanka
- Gasteracantha rhomboidea Guerin, 1838 — Mauritius
  - Gasteracantha rhomboidea comorensis Strand, 1917 — Comoro Islands
  - Gasteracantha rhomboidea madagascariensis Vinson, 1863 — Madagascar
- Gasteracantha rubrospinis Guerin, 1838 — Lombok, Sulawesi, Moluccas, New Caledonia, Guam
- Gasteracantha rufithorax Simon, 1881 — Madagascar
- Gasteracantha sacerdotalis L. Koch, 1872 — New Guinea, Queensland, New Caledonia
- Gasteracantha sanguinea Dahl, 1914 — Philippines
- Gasteracantha sanguinolenta C. L. Koch, 1844 — Africa, Sao Tome, Yemen, Seychelles, Socotra
  - Gasteracantha sanguinolenta andrefanae Emerit, 1974 — Madagascar
  - Gasteracantha sanguinolenta bigoti Emerit, 1974 — Madagascar
  - Gasteracantha sanguinolenta emeriti Roberts, 1983 — Aldabra
  - Gasteracantha sanguinolenta insulicola Emerit, 1974 — Seychelles
  - Gasteracantha sanguinolenta legendrei Emerit, 1974 — Europa Islands
  - Gasteracantha sanguinolenta mangrovae Emerit, 1974 — Madagascar
  - Gasteracantha sanguinolenta rueppelli (Strand, 1916) — Egypt
- Gasteracantha sapperi Dahl, 1914 — New Guinea
- Gasteracantha sauteri Dahl, 1914 — China, Taiwan
- Gasteracantha scintillans Butler, 1873 — Solomon Islands
- Gasteracantha signifera Pocock, 1898 — Solomon Islands
  - Gasteracantha signifera bistrigella Strand, 1915 — Bismarck Archipel
  - Gasteracantha signifera heterospina Strand, 1915 — Bismarck Archipel
  - Gasteracantha signifera pustulinota Strand, 1915 — Bismarck Archipel
- Gasteracantha simoni O. P.-Cambridge, 1879 — Central Africa
- Gasteracantha sororna Butler, 1873 — India
- Gasteracantha sturi (Doleschall, 1857) — Laos, Sumatra, Java, Borneo, Moluccas
- Gasteracantha subaequispina Dahl, 1914 — Borneo, New Guinea
- Gasteracantha taeniata (Walckenaer, 1841) — India to Polynesia
  - Gasteracantha taeniata analispina Strand, 1911 — New Guinea
  - Gasteracantha taeniata anirensis Strand, 1911 — New Ireland
  - Gasteracantha taeniata bawensis Strand, 1915 — New Guinea
  - Gasteracantha taeniata jamurensis Strand, 1915 — New Guinea
  - Gasteracantha taeniata lugubris Simon, 1898 — Solomon Islands
  - Gasteracantha taeniata maculella Strand, 1911 — Aru Islands
  - Gasteracantha taeniata novahannoveriana Dahl, 1914 — Bismarck Archipel
  - Gasteracantha taeniata obsoletopicta Strand, 1915 — Indonesia
  - Gasteracantha taeniata oinokensis Strand, 1915 — New Guinea
  - Gasteracantha taeniata sentanensis Strand, 1915 — New Guinea
  - Gasteracantha taeniata trivittinota Strand, 1911 — New Ireland
  - Gasteracantha taeniata univittinota Strand, 1911 — New Ireland
- Gasteracantha theisi Guerin, 1838 — New Guinea, Moluccas
  - Gasteracantha theisi antemaculata Strand, 1911 — Aru Islands
  - Gasteracantha theisi keyana Strand, 1911 — Kei Islands
  - Gasteracantha theisi quadrisignatella Strand, 1911 — Indonesia
- Gasteracantha thomasinsulae Archer, 1951 — Sao Tome
- Gasteracantha thorelli Keyserling, 1864 — Madagascar
- Gasteracantha tondanae Pocock, 1897 — Sulawesi
- Gasteracantha transversa C. L. Koch, 1837 — Sumatra, Java
- Gasteracantha unguifera Simon, 1889 — China, India
- Gasteracantha versicolor (Walckenaer, 1841) — Central, East, Southern Africa
  - Gasteracantha versicolor avaratrae Emerit, 1974 — Madagascar
  - Gasteracantha versicolor formosa Vinson, 1863 — Madagascar
- Gasteracantha westringi Keyserling, 1864 — Australia, Admiralty Islands, New Caledonia

== Gastroxya ==
Gastroxya Benoit, 1962

- Gastroxya benoiti Emerit, 1973 — South Africa
- Gastroxya krausi Benoit, 1962 — Liberia, Congo
- Gastroxya leleupi Benoit, 1962 — Congo
- Gastroxya schoutedeni Benoit, 1962 (type species) — Congo, Rwanda, Burundi

== Gea ==
Gea C. L. Koch, 1843

- Gea africana Simon, 1895 — Congo
- Gea argiopides Strand, 1911 — Aru Islands, New Guinea
- Gea bituberculata (Thorell, 1881) — New Guinea
- Gea eff Levi, 1983 — New Guinea, New Britain
- Gea heptagon (Hentz, 1850) — USA to Argentina, South Pacific Islands, Australia
- Gea infuscata Tullgren, 1910 — East Africa, Angola
- Gea nilotica Simon, 1906 — Egypt, Sudan
- Gea spinipes C. L. Koch, 1843 (type species) — India, China, Taiwan to Borneo
  - Gea spinipes nigrifrons Simon, 1901 — Malaysia
- Gea subarmata Thorell, 1890 — India, Bangladesh to Philippines, New Guinea
- Gea theridioides (L. Koch, 1872) — Queensland, New South Wales
- Gea transversovittata Tullgren, 1910 — Congo, East Africa
- Gea zaragosa Barrion & Litsinger, 1995 — Philippines

== Gibbaranea ==
Gibbaranea Archer, 1951

- Gibbaranea abscissa (Karsch, 1879) — Russia, China, Korea, Japan
- Gibbaranea bifida Guo, Zhang & Zhu, 2011 — China
- Gibbaranea bituberculata (Walckenaer, 1802) (type species) — Palearctic
- Gibbaranea bruuni Lissner, 2016 - Majorca, Portugal, Algeria, Tunisia
- Gibbaranea gibbosa (Walckenaer, 1802) — Europe to Azerbaijan
  - Gibbaranea gibbosa confinis (Simon, 1870) — Spain, Corsica
- Gibbaranea hetian (Hu & Wu, 1989) — China, Mongolia
- Gibbaranea indiana Roy, Saha & Raychaudhuri, 2015 - India
- Gibbaranea nanguosa Yin & Gong, 1996 — China
- Gibbaranea occidentalis Wunderlich, 1989 — Azores
- Gibbaranea omoeda (Thorell, 1870) — Palearctic
- Gibbaranea tenerifensis Wunderlich, 1992 — Canary Islands
- Gibbaranea ullrichi (Hahn, 1835) — Europe, Russia, Central Asia

== Glyptogona ==
Glyptogona Simon, 1884

- Glyptogona duriuscula Simon, 1895 — Sri Lanka
- Glyptogona sextuberculata (Keyserling, 1863) (type species) — Italy to Israel

== Gnolus ==
- Gnolus Simon, 1879
- Gnolus angulifrons Simon, 1896 - Chile, Argentina
- Gnolus blinkeni Platnick & Shadab, 1993 - Chile, Argentina
- Gnolus cordiformis (Nicolet, 1849) (type species) - Chile, Argentina
- Gnolus limbatus (Nicolet, 1849) - Chile
- Gnolus spiculator (Nicolet, 1849) - Chile, Argentina
- Gnolus zonulatus Tullgren, 1902 - Chile, Argentina

== Herennia ==
Herennia Thorell, 1877

- Herennia agnarssoni Kuntner, 2005 — Solomon Islands
- Herennia deelemanae Kuntner, 2005 — Borneo
- Herennia etruscilla Kuntner, 2005 — Java
- Herennia gagamba Kuntner, 2005 — Philippines
- Herennia jernej Kuntner, 2005 — Sumatra
- Herennia milleri Kuntner, 2005 — New Guinea, New Britain
- Herennia multipuncta (Doleschall, 1859) — India to China, Borneo, Sulawesi
- Herennia oz Kuntner, 2005 — Northern Territory
- Herennia papuana Thorell, 1881 — New Guinea
- Herennia sonja Kuntner, 2005 — Kalimantan, Sulawesi
- Herennia tone Kuntner, 2005 — Philippines

== Heterognatha ==
Heterognatha Nicolet, 1849

- Heterognatha chilensis Nicolet, 1849 — Chile

== Heurodes ==
Heurodes Keyserling, 1886

- Heurodes fratrellus (Chamberlin, 1924) — China
- Heurodes porculus (Simon, 1877) — Singapore, Philippines
- Heurodes turritus Keyserling, 1886 (type species) — Tasmania

== Hingstepeira ==
Hingstepeira Levi, 1995

- Hingstepeira arnolisei Levi, 1995 — Brazil
- Hingstepeira dimona Levi, 1995 — Brazil
- Hingstepeira folisecens (Hingston, 1932) (type species) — Colombia, Brazil, Guyana, Suriname, French Guiana
- Hingstepeira isherton Levi, 1995 — Guyana

== Hypognatha ==
Hypognatha Guerin, 1839

- Hypognatha alho Levi, 1996 — Brazil
- Hypognatha belem Levi, 1996 — Brazil
- Hypognatha cacau Levi, 1996 — Peru, Brazil
- Hypognatha cambara Levi, 1996 — Brazil
- Hypognatha carpish Levi, 1996 — Peru
- Hypognatha colosso Levi, 1996 — Colombia, Brazil
- Hypognatha coyo Levi, 1996 — Colombia
- Hypognatha cryptocephala Mello-Leitao, 1947 — Brazil
- Hypognatha deplanata (Taczanowski, 1873) — Brazil, French Guiana
- Hypognatha divuca Levi, 1996 — Peru
- Hypognatha elaborata Chickering, 1953 — Costa Rica, Panama, Colombia
- Hypognatha furcifera (O. P.-Cambridge, 1881) — Brazil
- Hypognatha ica Levi, 1996 — Colombia, Brazil
- Hypognatha ituara Levi, 1996 — Brazil
- Hypognatha jacaze Levi, 1996 — Brazil
- Hypognatha janauari Levi, 1996 — Brazil
- Hypognatha lagoas Levi, 1996 — Brazil
- Hypognatha lamoka Levi, 1996 — Venezuela
- Hypognatha maranon Levi, 1996 — Peru
- Hypognatha maria Levi, 1996 — Peru
- Hypognatha matisia Levi, 1996 — Peru
- Hypognatha mirandaribeiroi Soares & Camargo, 1948 — Brazil
- Hypognatha mozamba Levi, 1996 — Colombia, Ecuador, Peru, Brazil
- Hypognatha nasuta O. P.-Cambridge, 1896 — Mexico
- Hypognatha navio Levi, 1996 — Venezuela, Brazil
- Hypognatha pereiroi Levi, 1996 — Brazil
- Hypognatha putumayo Levi, 1996 — Colombia, Ecuador
- Hypognatha rancho Levi, 1996 — Venezuela
- Hypognatha saut Levi, 1996 — French Guiana
- Hypognatha scutata (Perty, 1833) (type species) — Trinidad to Argentina
- Hypognatha solimoes Levi, 1996 — Brazil
- Hypognatha tampo Levi, 1996 — Peru
- Hypognatha testudinaria (Taczanowski, 1879) — Peru
- Hypognatha tingo Levi, 1996 — Peru
- Hypognatha tocantins Levi, 1996 — Brazil
- Hypognatha triunfo Levi, 1996 — Brazil
- Hypognatha utari Levi, 1996 — Brazil
- Hypognatha viamao Levi, 1996 — Brazil

== Hypsacantha ==
Hypsacantha Dahl, 1914

- Hypsacantha crucimaculata (Dahl, 1914) — Central, East, Southern Africa

== Hypsosinga ==
Hypsosinga Ausserer, 1871

- Hypsosinga alberta Levi, 1972 — Russia, Canada
- Hypsosinga alboria Yin et al., 1990 — China
- Hypsosinga albovittata (Westring, 1851) — Europe, North Africa, Russia, Ukraine
- Hypsosinga clax Oliger, 1993 — Russia
- Hypsosinga funebris (Keyserling, 1892) — USA, Canada
- Hypsosinga groenlandica Simon, 1889 — USA, Canada, Greenland
- Hypsosinga heri (Hahn, 1831) — Palearctic
- Hypsosinga kazachstanica Ponomarev, 2007 — Kazakhstan
- Hypsosinga lithyphantoides Caporiacco, 1947 — Uganda, Kenya
  - Hypsosinga lithyphantoides dealbata Caporiacco, 1949 — Kenya
- Hypsosinga luzhongxiani Barrion, Barrion-Dupo & Heong, 2013 - China
- Hypsosinga pygmaea (Sundevall, 1831) — Holarctic
  - Hypsosinga pygmaea nigra (Simon, 1909) — Vietnam
  - Hypsosinga pygmaea nigriceps (Kulczynski, 1903) — Turkey
- Hypsosinga rubens (Hentz, 1847) — USA, Canada
- Hypsosinga sanguinea (C. L. Koch, 1844) (type species) — Palearctic
- Hypsosinga satpuraensis Bodkhe, Uniyal & Kamble, 2016 - India
- Hypsosinga taprobanica (Simon, 1895) — Sri Lanka
- Hypsosinga turkmenica Bakhvalov, 1978 — Turkmenistan
- Hypsosinga vaulogeri (Simon, 1909) — Vietnam
- Hypsosinga wanica Song, Qian & Gao, 1996 — China

== Ideocaira ==
Ideocaira Simon, 1903

- Ideocaira transversa Simon, 1903 (type species) — South Africa
- Ideocaira triquetra Simon, 1903 — South Africa

== Isoxya ==
Isoxya Simon, 1885

- Isoxya basilewskyi Benoit & Emerit, 1975 — Rwanda, Congo
- Isoxya cicatricosa (C. L. Koch, 1844) (type species) — Central, East, Southern Africa, Yemen
- Isoxya cowani (Butler, 1882) — Madagascar
- Isoxya mahafalensis Emerit, 1974 — Madagascar
- Isoxya milloti Emerit, 1974 — Madagascar
- Isoxya mossamedensis Benoit, 1962 — Angola
- Isoxya mucronata (Walckenaer, 1841) — Central, Southern Africa
- Isoxya nigromutica (Caporiacco, 1939) — East Africa
- Isoxya penizoides Simon, 1887 — West, Central, East Africa
- Isoxya reuteri (Lenz, 1886) — Madagascar
- Isoxya semiflava Simon, 1887 — West, Central Africa
- Isoxya somalica (Caporiacco, 1940) — Somalia
- Isoxya stuhlmanni (Bösenberg & Lenz, 1895) — Central, East, Southern Africa
- Isoxya tabulata (Thorell, 1859) — Central, East, Southern Africa
- Isoxya testudinaria (Simon, 1901) — West, Central, East Africa
- Isoxya yatesi Emerit, 1973 — South Africa

== Kaira ==
Kaira O. P.-Cambridge, 1889

- Kaira alba (Hentz, 1850) — USA, Mexico
- Kaira altiventer O. P.-Cambridge, 1889 — USA to Brazil
- Kaira candidissima (Mello-Leitao, 1941) — Argentina
- Kaira cobimcha Levi, 1993 — Brazil
- Kaira conica Gerschman & Schiapelli, 1948 — Brazil, Argentina
- Kaira dianae Levi, 1993 — Peru
- Kaira echinus (Simon, 1897) — Brazil, Argentina
- Kaira electa (Keyserling, 1883) — Brazil
- Kaira erwini Levi, 1993 — Peru
- Kaira gibberosa O. P.-Cambridge, 1890 (type species) — Mexico to Brazil
- Kaira hiteae Levi, 1977 — USA
- Kaira levii Alayón, 1993 — Cuba
- Kaira sabino Levi, 1977 — USA
- Kaira sexta (Chamberlin, 1916) — Guatemala to Brazil
- Kaira shinguito Levi, 1993 — Peru
- Kaira tulua Levi, 1993 — Colombia

== Kapogea ==
Kapogea Levi, 1997

- Kapogea cyrtophoroides (F. O. P.-Cambridge, 1904) — Mexico to Peru, Bolivia, Brazil
- Kapogea isosceles (Mello-Leitao, 1939) — Greater Antilles, Panama to Argentina
- Kapogea sellata (Simon, 1895) (type species) — Greater Antilles, Costa Rica to Argentina
- Kapogea sexnotata (Simon, 1895) — Venezuela to Peru, Bolivia, Brazil

== Kilima ==
Kilima Grasshoff, 1970

- Kilima conspersa Grasshoff, 1970 — Congo
- Kilima decens (Blackwall, 1866) (type species) — Central, East, Southern Africa, Seychelles
- Kilima griseovariegata (Tullgren, 1910) — Central, East Africa, Yemen

== Larinia ==
Larinia Simon, 1874

- Larinia acuticauda Simon, 1906 — West Africa to Israel
- Larinia ambo Harrod, Levi & Leibensperger, 1991 — Ecuador, Peru
- Larinia assimilis Tullgren, 1910 — East Africa
- Larinia astrigera Yin et al., 1990 — China
- Larinia bharatae Bhandari & Gajbe, 2001 — India
- Larinia bifida Tullgren, 1910 — Central, East, Southern Africa, Seychelles
- Larinia bivittata Keyserling, 1885 — Brazil, Paraguay, Uruguay, Argentina, Chile
- Larinia blandula (Grasshoff, 1971) — West Africa
- Larinia bonneti Spassky, 1939 — Palearctic
- Larinia borealis Banks, 1894 — North America
- Larinia bossae Marusik, 1987 — Russia
- Larinia chloris (Audouin, 1826) — Turkey to Mozambique, India
- Larinia cyclera Yin et al., 1990 — China
- Larinia dasia (Roberts, 1983) — Aldabra
- Larinia delicata Rainbow, 1920 — Lord Howe Islands
- Larinia dinanea Yin et al., 1990 — China
- Larinia directa (Hentz, 1847) — USA to Brazil
- Larinia duchengcaii Barrion, Barrion-Dupo & Heong, 2013 - China
- Larinia elegans Spassky, 1939 — Austria to China
- Larinia emertoni Gajbe & Gajbe, 2004 — India
- Larinia famulatoria (Keyserling, 1883) — USA, Mexico
- Larinia fangxiangensis Zhu, Lian & Chen, 2006 — China
- Larinia jamberoo Framenau & Scharff, 2008 — New South Wales, Victoria, South Australia
- Larinia jaysankari Biswas, 1984 — India
- Larinia jeskovi Marusik, 1987 — Eastern Europe to Japan
- Larinia kampala (Grasshoff, 1971) — Uganda
- Larinia kanpurae Patel & Nigam, 1994 — India
- Larinia lampa Harrod, Levi & Leibensperger, 1991 — Peru, Bolivia
- Larinia lineata (Lucas, 1846) (type species) — Western Mediterranean
- Larinia liuae Yin & Bao, 2012 — China
- Larinia macrohooda Yin et al., 1990 — China
- Larinia madhuchhandae Biswas & Raychaudhuri, 2012 - Bangladesh
- Larinia mandlaensis Gajbe, 2005 — India
- Larinia microhooda Yin et al., 1990 — China
- Larinia minor (Bryant, 1945) — Hispaniola
- Larinia montagui Hogg, 1914 — Australia, Lord Howe Islands, Norfolk Islands
- Larinia montecarlo (Levi, 1988) — Brazil, Argentina
- Larinia natalensis (Grasshoff, 1971) — South Africa
- Larinia neblina Harrod, Levi & Leibensperger, 1991 — Venezuela
- Larinia nolabelia Yin et al., 1990 — China
- Larinia obtusa (Grasshoff, 1971) — Congo
- Larinia onoi Tanikawa, 1989 — Japan
- Larinia parangmata Barrion & Litsinger, 1995 — Philippines
- Larinia phthisica (L. Koch, 1871) — Asia, Japan, Philippines, New Guinea, Australia
- Larinia pubiventris Simon, 1889 — Central Asia
- Larinia sekiguchii Tanikawa, 1989 — Russia, China, Japan
- Larinia strandi Caporiacco, 1941 — Ethiopia
- Larinia t-notata (Tullgren, 1905) — Brazil, Argentina
- Larinia tabida (L. Koch, 1872) — Sulawesi to Australia, New Caledonia
- Larinia tamatave (Grasshoff, 1971) — Madagascar
- Larinia teiraensis Biswas & Biswas, 2007 — India
- Larinia trifida Tullgren, 1910 — Central, East Africa
- Larinia triprovina Yin et al., 1990 — China
- Larinia tucuman Harrod, Levi & Leibensperger, 1991 — Argentina
- Larinia tyloridia Patel, 1975 — India
- Larinia vara Kauri, 1950 — South Africa
- Larinia wenshanensis Yin & Yan, 1994 — China

== Lariniaria ==
Lariniaria Grasshoff, 1970

- Lariniaria argiopiformis (Bösenberg & Strand, 1906) — Russia, China, Korea, Japan

== Larinioides ==
Larinioides Caporiacco, 1934

- Larinioides chabarovi (Bakhvalov, 1981) — Russia
- Larinioides cornutus (Clerck, 1757) — Holarctic
- Larinioides ixobolus (Thorell, 1873) — Palearctic
- Larinioides jalimovi (Bakhvalov, 1981) - Russia, Korea
- Larinioides patagiatus (Clerck, 1757) - Holarctic
- Larinioides sclopetarius (Clerck, 1757) — Holarctic
- Larinioides suspicax (O. P.-Cambridge, 1876) — Europe to Central Asia

== Leviellus ==
Leviellus Wunderlich, 2004

- Leviellus caspica (Simon, 1889) — Central Asia
- Leviellus inconveniens (O. P.-Cambridge, 1872) — Lebanon, Israel
- Leviellus kochi (Thorell, 1870) (type species) — Southern Europe, North Africa, Central Asia
- Leviellus poriensis (Levy, 1987) - Israel
- Leviellus stroemi (Thorell, 1870) - Palearctic
- Leviellus thorelli (Ausserer, 1871) — Europe

== Lewisepeira ==
Lewisepeira Levi, 1993

- Lewisepeira boquete Levi, 1993 — Panama
- Lewisepeira chichinautzin Levi, 1993 — Mexico
- Lewisepeira farri (Archer, 1958) (type species) — Jamaica
- Lewisepeira maricao Levi, 1993 — Puerto Rico

== Lipocrea ==
Lipocrea Thorell, 1878

- Lipocrea diluta Thorell, 1887 — Myanmar to Indonesia
- Lipocrea epeiroides (O. P.-Cambridge, 1872) — Greece, Cyprus, Turkey, Israel, Yemen, India
- Lipocrea fusiformis (Thorell, 1877) (type species) — India to Japan, Philippines, Sulawesi
- Lipocrea longissima (Simon, 1881) — Central, East, Southern Africa

== Macracantha ==
Macracantha Simon, 1864

- Macracantha arcuata (Fabricius, 1793) — India, China to Borneo

== Madacantha ==
Madacantha Emerit, 1970

- Madacantha nossibeana (Strand, 1916) — Madagascar

== Mahembea ==
Mahembea Grasshoff, 1970

- Mahembea hewitti (Lessert, 1930) — Central, East Africa

== Mangora ==
Mangora O. P.-Cambridge, 1889

- Mangora acalypha (Walckenaer, 1802) — Palearctic
- Mangora acaponeta Levi, 2005 — Mexico
- Mangora acoripa Levi, 2007 — Brazil
- Mangora acre Levi, 2007 — Colombia, Peru, Brazil
- Mangora alinahui Levi, 2007 — Ecuador, Bolivia, Brazil
- Mangora amacayacu Levi, 2007 — Colombia, Venezuela, Peru, Brazil
- Mangora amchickeringi Levi, 2005 — Panama, Colombia, Venezuela, Trinidad
- Mangora angulopicta Yin et al., 1990 — China
- Mangora anilensis Levi, 2007 — Brazil
- Mangora antillana Dierkens, 2012 — Martinique
- Mangora antonio Levi, 2007 — Brazil
- Mangora apaporis Levi, 2007 — Colombia, Peru
- Mangora apobama Levi, 2007 — Peru, Bolivia, Brazil
- Mangora argenteostriata Simon, 1897 — Brazil
- Mangora aripeba Levi, 2007 — Brazil
- Mangora aripuana Levi, 2007 — Brazil
- Mangora asis Levi, 2007 — Colombia
- Mangora ayo Levi, 2007 — Colombia
- Mangora balbina Levi, 2007 — Brazil
- Mangora bambusa Levi, 2007 — Colombia
- Mangora barba Levi, 2007 — Colombia
- Mangora bemberg Levi, 2007 — Brazil, Argentina
- Mangora bimaculata (O. P.-Cambridge, 1889) — Mexico to Costa Rica
- Mangora blumenau Levi, 2007 — Brazil
- Mangora bocaina Levi, 2007 — Brazil
- Mangora bonaldoi Levi, 2007 — Brazil
- Mangora botelho Levi, 2007 — Brazil
- Mangora bovis Levi, 2007 — Brazil, Guyana
- Mangora boyaca Levi, 2007 — Colombia
- Mangora brokopondo Levi, 2007 — Brazil, Guyana, Suriname, French Guiana
- Mangora browns Levi, 2007 — Suriname
- Mangora caballero Levi, 2007 — Brazil, Argentina
- Mangora cajuta Levi, 2007 — Bolivia
- Mangora calcarifera F. O. P.-Cambridge, 1904 — USA to Costa Rica
- Mangora campeche Levi, 2005 — Mexico
- Mangora candida Chickering, 1954 — Panama
- Mangora caparu Levi, 2007 — Colombia
- Mangora castelo Levi, 2007 — Brazil
- Mangora caxias Levi, 2007 — Brazil, Argentina
- Mangora cercado Levi, 2007 — Brazil
- Mangora chacobo Levi, 2007 — Peru, Bolivia, Brazil
- Mangora chanchamayo Levi, 2007 — Peru
- Mangora chao Levi, 2007 — Brazil, Paraguay
- Mangora chavantina Levi, 2007 — Brazil, French Guiana
- Mangora chicanna Levi, 2005 — Mexico to Honduras
- Mangora chiguaza Levi, 2007 — Ecuador, Peru
- Mangora chispa Levi, 2007 — Peru
- Mangora chuquisaca Levi, 2007 — Bolivia, Argentina
- Mangora cochuna Levi, 2007 — Peru, Argentina
- Mangora colonche Levi, 2007 — Peru, Ecuador
- Mangora comaina Levi, 2007 — Peru
- Mangora corcovado Levi, 2005 — Costa Rica
- Mangora corocito Levi, 2007 — Venezuela, French Guiana
- Mangora craigae Levi, 2005 — Costa Rica
- Mangora crescopicta Yin et al., 1990 — China
- Mangora cutucu Levi, 2007 — Ecuador
- Mangora dagua Levi, 2007 — Colombia
- Mangora dianasilvae Levi, 2007 — Colombia, Venezuela, Trinidad, Peru, Bolivia, Brazil
- Mangora distincta Chickering, 1963 — Honduras to Costa Rica
- Mangora divisor Levi, 2007 — Brazil
- Mangora eberhardi Levi, 2007 — Colombia
- Mangora engleri Levi, 2007 — Ecuador
- Mangora enseada Levi, 2007 — Brazil, Argentina
- Mangora explorama Levi, 2007 — Peru
- Mangora falconae Schenkel, 1953 — Panama, Colombia, Venezuela
- Mangora fascialata Franganillo, 1936 — USA to Honduras, Cuba, Hispaniola, Trinidad
- Mangora florestal Levi, 2007 — Brazil
- Mangora foliosa Zhu & Yin, 1998 — China
- Mangora fornicata (Keyserling, 1864) — Colombia
- Mangora fortuna Levi, 2005 — Costa Rica, Panama
- Mangora fundo Levi, 2007 — Brazil
- Mangora gibberosa (Hentz, 1847) — North America
- Mangora goodnightorum Levi, 2005 — Mexico
- Mangora grande Levi, 2007 — Venezuela
- Mangora hemicraera (Thorell, 1890) — Malaysia
- Mangora herbeoides (Bösenberg & Strand, 1906) — China, Korea, Japan
- Mangora hirtipes (Taczanowski, 1878) — Peru, Brazil, Guyana, French Guiana
- Mangora huallaga Levi, 2007 — Peru, Bolivia
- Mangora huancabamba Levi, 2007 — Peru
- Mangora ikuruwa Levi, 2007 — Venezuela, Guyana, French Guiana, Peru
- Mangora inconspicua Schenkel, 1936 — China
- Mangora insperata Soares & Camargo, 1948 — Colombia, Peru, Brazil
- Mangora isabel Levi, 2007 — Brazil, French Guiana
- Mangora itabapuana Levi, 2007 — Brazil
- Mangora itatiaia Levi, 2007 — Brazil
- Mangora itza Levi, 2005 — Mexico
- Mangora ixtapan Levi, 2005 — Mexico
- Mangora jumboe Levi, 2007 — Ecuador
- Mangora keduc Levi, 2007 — Brazil
- Mangora kochalkai Levi, 2007 — Colombia
- Mangora kuntur Levi, 2007 — Peru
- Mangora lactea Mello-Leitao, 1944 — Bolivia, Brazil, Argentina
- Mangora laga Levi, 2007 — Peru
- Mangora latica Levi, 2007 — Colombia
- Mangora lechugal Levi, 2007 — Peru, Ecuador
- Mangora leticia Levi, 2007 — Colombia
- Mangora leucogasteroides Roewer, 1955 — Myanmar
- Mangora leverger Levi, 2007 — Brazil, Paraguay
- Mangora logrono Levi, 2007 — Ecuador
- Mangora maculata (Keyserling, 1865) — USA
- Mangora mamiraua Levi, 2007 — Brazil
- Mangora manglar Levi, 2007 — Ecuador
- Mangora manicore Levi, 2007 — Brazil
- Mangora mapia Levi, 2007 — Brazil
- Mangora matamata Levi, 2007 — Colombia
- Mangora mathani Simon, 1895 — Colombia, Peru, Ecuador, Brazil
- Mangora maximiano Levi, 2007 — Brazil
- Mangora melanocephala (Taczanowski, 1874) — Mexico to Argentina
- Mangora melanoleuca Mello-Leitao, 1941 — Argentina
- Mangora melloleitaoi Levi, 2007 — Brazil
- Mangora minacu Levi, 2007 — Brazil
- Mangora missa Levi, 2007 — Brazil, Argentina
- Mangora mitu Levi, 2007 — Colombia
- Mangora mobilis (O. P.-Cambridge, 1889) — Mexico to Honduras
- Mangora montana Chickering, 1954 — Costa Rica, Panama
- Mangora morona Levi, 2007 — Ecuador, Brazil
- Mangora moyobamba Levi, 2007 — Peru
- Mangora nahuatl Levi, 2005 — Mexico
- Mangora nonoai Levi, 2007 — Brazil
- Mangora novempupillata Mello-Leitao, 1940 — Colombia, Peru, Bolivia, Brazil
- Mangora nuco Levi, 2007 — Peru
- Mangora oaxaca Levi, 2005 — Mexico
- Mangora ordaz Levi, 2007 — Venezuela
- Mangora ouropreto Santos & Santos, 2011 — Brazil
- Mangora oxapampa Levi, 2007 — Peru
- Mangora pagoreni Levi, 2007 — Peru
- Mangora palenque Levi, 2007 — Ecuador
- Mangora paranaiba Levi, 2007 — Brazil
- Mangora passiva (O. P.-Cambridge, 1889) — USA to Nicaragua
- Mangora paula Levi, 2007 — Brazil
- Mangora peichiuta Levi, 2007 — Paraguay
- Mangora pepino Levi, 2007 — Colombia
- Mangora pia Chamberlin & Ivie, 1936 — Panama, Colombia, Venezuela, Brazil
- Mangora picta O. P.-Cambridge, 1889 (type species) — Mexico to Honduras
- Mangora pira Levi, 2007 — Colombia
- Mangora piratini Rodrigues & Mendonça, 2011 — Brazil
- Mangora piroca Levi, 2007 — Brazil
- Mangora placida (Hentz, 1847) — North America
- Mangora polypicula Yin et al., 1990 — China
- Mangora porcullo Levi, 2007 — Peru
- Mangora puerto Levi, 2007 — Peru
- Mangora punctipes (Taczanowski, 1878) — Peru
- Mangora purulha Levi, 2005 — Guatemala
- Mangora ramirezi Levi, 2007 — Brazil, Argentina
- Mangora rhombopicta Yin et al., 1990 — China
- Mangora rondonia Levi, 2007 — Brazil
- Mangora rupununi Levi, 2007 — Guyana
- Mangora saut Levi, 2007 — French Guiana
- Mangora schneirlai Chickering, 1954 — Costa Rica, Panama
- Mangora sciosciae Levi, 2007 — Argentina
- Mangora semiargentea Simon, 1895 — Sri Lanka
- Mangora semiatra Levi, 2007 — Colombia, Venezuela, Peru
- Mangora shudikar Levi, 2007 — Guyana
- Mangora sobradinho Levi, 2007 — Brazil
- Mangora socorpa Levi, 2007 — Colombia
- Mangora songyangensis Yin et al., 1990 — China
- Mangora spiculata (Hentz, 1847) — USA, China
- Mangora strenua (Keyserling, 1893) — Brazil, Argentina
- Mangora sturmi Levi, 2007 — Colombia
- Mangora sufflava Chickering, 1963 — Panama
- Mangora sumauma Levi, 2007 — Brazil
- Mangora taboquinha Levi, 2007 — Brazil
- Mangora taczanowskii Levi, 2007 — Peru
- Mangora tambo Levi, 2007 — Peru
- Mangora taraira Levi, 2007 — Colombia
- Mangora tarapuy Levi, 2007 — Ecuador, Brazil
- Mangora tarma Levi, 2007 — Peru
- Mangora tefe Levi, 2007 — Colombia, Ecuador, Brazil
- Mangora theridioides Mello-Leitao, 1948 — Guyana
- Mangora tschekiangensis Schenkel, 1963 — China
- Mangora umbrata Simon, 1897 — Peru
- Mangora unam Levi, 2007 — Colombia, Peru, Brazil
- Mangora uraricoera Levi, 2007 — Colombia, Venezuela, Peru, Ecuador, Brazil, Guyana, Suriname, French Guiana
- Mangora uru Levi, 2007 — Peru
- Mangora uziga Levi, 2007 — Paraguay, Argentina
- Mangora v-signata Mello-Leitao, 1943 — Bolivia, Brazil, Argentina
- Mangora vaupes Levi, 2007 — Colombia
- Mangora velha Levi, 2007 — Brazil
- Mangora vianai Levi, 2007 — Argentina
- Mangora villeta Levi, 2007 — Colombia
- Mangora vito Levi, 2005 — Costa Rica
- Mangora volcan Levi, 2005 — Panama
- Mangora yacupoi Levi, 2007 — Argentina
- Mangora yungas Levi, 2007 — Argentina
- Mangora zepol Levi, 2007 — Colombia
- Mangora zona Levi, 2007 — Peru

== Manogea ==
Manogea Levi, 1997

- Manogea gaira Levi, 1997 — Colombia, Venezuela
- Manogea porracea (C. L. Koch, 1838) (type species) — Panama to Argentina
- Manogea triforma Levi, 1997 — Mexico, Guatemala, Honduras

== Mastophora ==
Mastophora Holmberg, 1876

- Mastophora abalosi Urtubey & Baez, 1983 — Argentina
- Mastophora alachua Levi, 2003 — USA
- Mastophora alvareztoroi Ibarra & Jimenez, 2003 — USA, Mexico
- Mastophora apalachicola Levi, 2003 — USA
- Mastophora archeri Gertsch, 1955 — USA
- Mastophora bisaccata (Emerton, 1884) — USA, Mexico
- Mastophora brescoviti Levi, 2003 — Brazil
- Mastophora caesariata Eberhard & Levi, 2006 — Costa Rica
- Mastophora carpogaster Mello-Leitao, 1925 — Brazil
- Mastophora catarina Levi, 2003 — Brazil
- Mastophora comma Baez & Urtubey, 1985 — Argentina
- Mastophora conica Levi, 2006 — Argentina
- Mastophora conifera (Holmberg, 1876) — Argentina
- Mastophora cornigera (Hentz, 1850) — USA to Nicaragua
- Mastophora corpulenta (Banks, 1898) — Mexico, Honduras, Nicaragua, Brazil
- Mastophora corumbatai Levi, 2003 — Brazil
- Mastophora cranion Mello-Leitao, 1928 — Brazil
- Mastophora diablo Levi, 2003 — Argentina
- Mastophora dizzydeani Eberhard, 1981 — Colombia, Peru
- Mastophora escomeli Levi, 2003 — Peru
- Mastophora extraordinaria Holmberg, 1876 (type species) — Brazil, Uruguay, Argentina
- Mastophora fasciata Reimoser, 1939 — Costa Rica, Venezuela
- Mastophora felda Levi, 2003 — USA
- Mastophora felis Piza, 1976 — Brazil
- Mastophora gasteracanthoides (Nicolet, 1849) — Chile
- Mastophora haywardi Biraben, 1946 — Argentina
- Mastophora holmbergi Canals, 1931 — Paraguay, Argentina
- Mastophora hutchinsoni Gertsch, 1955 — USA, Canada
- Mastophora lara Levi, 2003 — Venezuela
- Mastophora leucabulba (Gertsch, 1955) — USA to Honduras
- Mastophora leucacantha (Simon, 1897) — Brazil
- Mastophora longiceps Mello-Leitao, 1940 — Brazil
- Mastophora melloleitaoi Canals, 1931 — Brazil, Argentina
- Mastophora obtusa Mello-Leitao, 1936 — Brazil
- Mastophora pesqueiro Levi, 2003 — Brazil
- Mastophora phrynosoma Gertsch, 1955 — USA
- Mastophora pickeli Mello-Leitao, 1931 — Brazil
- Mastophora piras Levi, 2003 — Brazil
- Mastophora rabida Levi, 2003 — Galapagos Islands
- Mastophora reimoseri Levi, 2003 — Paraguay
- Mastophora satan Canals, 1931 — Brazil, Uruguay, Argentina
- Mastophora satsuma Levi, 2003 — USA
- Mastophora seminole Levi, 2003 — USA
- Mastophora soberiana Levi, 2003 — Panama
- Mastophora stowei Levi, 2003 — USA
- Mastophora timuqua Levi, 2003 — USA
- Mastophora vaquera Gertsch, 1955 — Cuba
- Mastophora yacare Levi, 2003 — Uruguay
- Mastophora yeargani Levi, 2003 — USA
- Mastophora ypiranga Levi, 2003 — Brazil

== Mecynogea ==
Mecynogea Simon, 1903

- Mecynogea apatzingan Levi, 1997 — Mexico
- Mecynogea bigibba Simon, 1903 (type species) — Brazil, Uruguay
- Mecynogea buique Levi, 1997 — Brazil
- Mecynogea chavona Levi, 1997 — Colombia
- Mecynogea erythromela (Holmberg, 1876) — Brazil, Paraguay, Argentina, Chile
- Mecynogea lemniscata (Walckenaer, 1841) — USA to Argentina
- Mecynogea martiana (Archer, 1958) — Cuba, Hispaniola
- Mecynogea ocosingo Levi, 1997 — Mexico
- Mecynogea sucre Levi, 1997 — Venezuela, Brazil

== Megaraneus ==
Megaraneus Lawrence, 1968

- Megaraneus gabonensis (Lucas, 1858) — Africa

== Melychiopharis ==
Melychiopharis Simon, 1895

- Melychiopharis bibendum Brescovit, Santos & Leite, 2011 — Brazil
- Melychiopharis cynips Simon, 1895 (type species) — Brazil

== Metazygia ==
Metazygia F. O. P.-Cambridge, 1904

- Metazygia adisi Levi, 1995 — Brazil
- Metazygia aldela Levi, 1995 — Brazil
- Metazygia amalla Levi, 1995 — Brazil
- Metazygia arnoi Levi, 1995 — Brazil
- Metazygia atalaya Levi, 1995 — Peru
- Metazygia atama Levi, 1995 — Brazil
- Metazygia bahama Levi, 1995 — Bahama Islands
- Metazygia bahia Levi, 1995 — Brazil
- Metazygia barueri Levi, 1995 — Brazil
- Metazygia benella Levi, 1995 — Panama, Colombia
- Metazygia bolivia Levi, 1995 — Bolivia
- Metazygia calix (Walckenaer, 1841) — USA
- Metazygia carimagua Levi, 1995 — Colombia
- Metazygia carolinalis (Archer, 1951) — USA
- Metazygia carrizal Levi, 1995 — Guatemala
- Metazygia castaneoscutata (Simon, 1895) — Peru, Brazil
- Metazygia cazeaca Levi, 1995 — Brazil
- Metazygia chenevo Levi, 1995 — Colombia, Guyana
- Metazygia chicanna Levi, 1995 — Mexico, Belize, Honduras, Jamaica
- Metazygia cienaga Levi, 1995 — Hispaniola
- Metazygia corima Levi, 1995 — Colombia
- Metazygia corumba Levi, 1995 — Bolivia, Brazil
- Metazygia crabroniphila Strand, 1916 — Brazil
- Metazygia crewi (Banks, 1903) — Greater Antilles, Virgin Islands
- Metazygia cunha Levi, 1995 — Brazil
- Metazygia curari Levi, 1995 — Brazil
- Metazygia dubia (Keyserling, 1864) — Costa Rica, Cuba to Galapagos Islands, Peru, Brazil
- Metazygia ducke Levi, 1995 — Brazil, Bolivia
- Metazygia enabla Levi, 1995 — Colombia, Venezuela
- Metazygia erratica (Keyserling, 1883) — Brazil
- Metazygia floresta Levi, 1995 — Brazil
- Metazygia genaro Levi, 1995 — Peru
- Metazygia genialis (Keyserling, 1892) — Brazil
- Metazygia goeldii Levi, 1995 — French Guiana, Brazil
- Metazygia gregalis (O. P.-Cambridge, 1889) — Nicaragua, West Indies to Argentina
- Metazygia ikuruwa Levi, 1995 — Guyana
- Metazygia incerta (O. P.-Cambridge, 1889) — Belize to Panama
- Metazygia ipago Levi, 1995 — Brazil
- Metazygia ipanga Levi, 1995 — Bolivia, Brazil, Argentina
- Metazygia isabelae Levi, 1995 — Brazil
- Metazygia ituari Levi, 1995 — Brazil
- Metazygia jamari Levi, 1995 — Brazil, Suriname
- Metazygia keyserlingi Banks, 1929 — Costa Rica, Panama, Colombia, Trinidad
- Metazygia lagiana Levi, 1995 — Peru, Brazil, Bolivia, Argentina
- Metazygia laticeps (O. P.-Cambridge, 1889) — Guatemala to Bolivia, Brazil
- Metazygia lazepa Levi, 1995 — Colombia, Venezuela
- Metazygia levii Santos, 2003 — Brazil
- Metazygia limonal Levi, 1995 — Peru, Brazil, Argentina
- Metazygia lopez Levi, 1995 — Colombia, Venezuela, Peru, Brazil
- Metazygia loque Levi, 1995 — Bolivia
- Metazygia manu Levi, 1995 — Peru, French Guiana
- Metazygia mariahelenae Levi, 1995 — Brazil
- Metazygia matanzas Levi, 1995 — Cuba
- Metazygia moldira Levi, 1995 — Ecuador, Peru
- Metazygia mundulella (Strand, 1916) — Brazil
- Metazygia nigrocincta (F. O. P.-Cambridge, 1904) — Mexico to Panama
- Metazygia nobas Levi, 1995 — Ecuador
- Metazygia octama Levi, 1995 — Panama to Peru
- Metazygia oro Levi, 1995 — Ecuador
- Metazygia pallidula (Keyserling, 1864) — Mexico to Peru
- Metazygia paquisha Levi, 1995 — Venezuela, Peru
- Metazygia pastaza Levi, 1995 — Peru
- Metazygia patiama Levi, 1995 — Peru, Brazil
- Metazygia peckorum Levi, 1995 — Colombia, Ecuador, Peru, Brazil
- Metazygia pimentel Levi, 1995 — Venezuela, Peru
- Metazygia redfordi Levi, 1995 — Brazil
- Metazygia rogenhoferi (Keyserling, 1878) — Brazil
- Metazygia rothi Levi, 1995 — Colombia
- Metazygia samiria Levi, 1995 — Peru
- Metazygia saturnino Levi, 1995 — Brazil
- Metazygia sendero Levi, 1995 — Colombia, Ecuador, Peru
- Metazygia serian Levi, 1995 — Costa Rica
- Metazygia silvestris (Bryant, 1942) — Puerto Rico
- Metazygia souza Levi, 1995 — Brazil
- Metazygia taman Levi, 1995 — Mexico
- Metazygia tanica Levi, 1995 — Guyana, French Guiana
- Metazygia tapa Levi, 1995 — Colombia, Peru, French Guiana
- Metazygia uma Levi, 1995 — Colombia, Peru, Brazil
- Metazygia uraricoera Levi, 1995 — Brazil, Guyana, Suriname
- Metazygia uratron Levi, 1995 — Brazil
- Metazygia valentim Levi, 1995 — Brazil
- Metazygia vaupes Levi, 1995 — Colombia, Peru, Brazil
- Metazygia vaurieorum Levi, 1995 — Guatemala
- Metazygia viriosa (Keyserling, 1892) — Brazil
- Metazygia voluptifica (Keyserling, 1892) — Colombia to Argentina
- Metazygia voxanta Levi, 1995 — Brazil
- Metazygia wittfeldae (McCook, 1894) (type species) — USA to Costa Rica
- Metazygia yobena Levi, 1995 — Colombia to Guyana, Bolivia
- Metazygia yucumo Levi, 1995 — Colombia, Peru, Bolivia, French Guiana
- Metazygia zilloides (Banks, 1898) — USA, West Indies to Honduras

== Metepeira ==
Metepeira F. O. P.-Cambridge, 1903

- Metepeira arizonica Chamberlin & Ivie, 1942 — USA, Mexico
- Metepeira atascadero Piel, 2001 — Mexico
- Metepeira bengryi (Archer, 1958) — Jamaica
- Metepeira brunneiceps Caporiacco, 1954 — French Guiana
- Metepeira cajabamba Piel, 2001 — Ecuador, Peru
- Metepeira calamuchita Piel, 2001 — Argentina
- Metepeira celestun Piel, 2001 — Mexico
- Metepeira chilapae Chamberlin & Ivie, 1936 — Mexico
- Metepeira comanche Levi, 1977 — USA, Mexico
- Metepeira compsa (Chamberlin, 1916) — Puerto Rico to Argentina
- Metepeira crassipes Chamberlin & Ivie, 1942 — USA, Mexico
- Metepeira datona Chamberlin & Ivie, 1942 — USA, Greater Antilles
- Metepeira desenderi Baert, 1987 — Galapagos Islands
- Metepeira foxi Gertsch & Ivie, 1936 — USA, Canada
- Metepeira galatheae (Thorell, 1891) — Chile, Argentina
- Metepeira glomerabilis (Keyserling, 1892) — Colombia to Paraguay, Brazil
- Metepeira gosoga Chamberlin & Ivie, 1935 — USA, Mexico
- Metepeira grandiosa Chamberlin & Ivie, 1941 — North America
- Metepeira gressa (Keyserling, 1892) — Brazil, Paraguay, Uruguay, Argentina
- Metepeira inca Piel, 2001 — Peru
- Metepeira incrassata F. O. P.-Cambridge, 1903 — Mexico
- Metepeira jamaicensis Archer, 1958 — Hispaniola, Jamaica, Grand Cayman Islands
- Metepeira karkii (Tullgren, 1901) — Chile, Argentina
- Metepeira labyrinthea (Hentz, 1847) — North America
- Metepeira lacandon Piel, 2001 — Mexico
- Metepeira lima Chamberlin & Ivie, 1942 — Peru
- Metepeira maya Piel, 2001 — Mexico to Costa Rica
- Metepeira minima Gertsch, 1936 — USA to Honduras
- Metepeira nigriventris (Taczanowski, 1878) — Peru, Bolivia
- Metepeira olmec Piel, 2001 — Mexico to Panama
- Metepeira pacifica Piel, 2001 — Honduras, Nicaragua, Costa Rica
- Metepeira palustris Chamberlin & Ivie, 1942 — USA, Canada
- Metepeira petatlan Piel, 2001 — Mexico
- Metepeira pimungan Piel, 2001 — USA
- Metepeira rectangula (Nicolet, 1849) — Chile, Argentina
- Metepeira revillagigedo Piel, 2001 — Mexico
- Metepeira roraima Piel, 2001 — Colombia, Brazil, Guyana
- Metepeira spinipes F. O. P.-Cambridge, 1903 (type species) — USA, Mexico
- Metepeira tarapaca Piel, 2001 — Peru, Chile
- Metepeira triangularis (Franganillo, 1930) — Cuba, Hispaniola
- Metepeira uncata F. O. P.-Cambridge, 1903 — Guatemala to Costa Rica
- Metepeira ventura Chamberlin & Ivie, 1942 — USA, Mexico
- Metepeira vigilax (Keyserling, 1893) — Hispaniola, Bolivia, Brazil, Argentina
- Metepeira ypsilonota Mello-Leitao, 1940 — Brazil

== Micrathena ==
Micrathena Sundevall, 1833

- Micrathena abrahami (Mello-Leitao, 1948) — Colombia to Brazil
- Micrathena acuta (Walckenaer, 1841) — Trinidad to Argentina
- Micrathena agriliformis (Taczanowski, 1879) — Costa Rica to Bolivia
- Micrathena alvarengai Levi, 1985 — Brazil
- Micrathena anchicaya Levi, 1985 — Colombia, Ecuador
- Micrathena annulata Reimoser, 1917 — Colombia, Brazil, Paraguay
- Micrathena armigera (C. L. Koch, 1837) — Brazil, Peru, Guyana
- Micrathena atuncela Levi, 1985 — Colombia
- Micrathena aureola (C. L. Koch, 1836) — Colombia to Suriname, Paraguay
- Micrathena balzapamba Levi, 1985 — Ecuador
- Micrathena bananal Levi, 1985 — Brazil
- Micrathena bandeirante (Magalhaes & Santos, 2011) — Brazil
- Micrathena banksi Levi, 1985 — Cuba
- Micrathena beta Caporiacco, 1947 — Guyana
- Micrathena bicolor (Keyserling, 1864) — Colombia, Peru
- Micrathena bifida (Taczanowski, 1879) — Peru
- Micrathena bimucronata (O. P.-Cambridge, 1899) — Mexico to Panama
- Micrathena bogota Levi, 1985 — Colombia
- Micrathena brevipes (O. P.-Cambridge, 1890) — Mexico to Panama
- Micrathena brevispina (Keyserling, 1864) — Panama to Argentina
- Micrathena carimagua (Levi, 1985) — Colombia, Venezuela
- Micrathena clypeata (Walckenaer, 1805) (type species) — Panama to Peru
- Micrathena coca Levi, 1985 — Colombia to Brazil
- Micrathena cornuta (Taczanowski, 1873) — Colombia to Brazil
- Micrathena coroico Levi, 1985 — Bolivia
- Micrathena crassa (Keyserling, 1864) — Costa Rica to Argentina
- Micrathena crassispina (C. L. Koch, 1836) — Brazil, Bolivia, Paraguay, Argentina
- Micrathena cubana (Banks, 1909) — Cuba
- Micrathena cucharas (Levi, 1985) — Peru
- Micrathena cyanospina (Lucas, 1835) — Colombia to Brazil
- Micrathena decorata Chickering, 1960 — Colombia
- Micrathena digitata (C. L. Koch, 1839) — Brazil
- Micrathena donaldi Chickering, 1961 — Costa Rica to Colombia
- Micrathena duodecimspinosa (O. P.-Cambridge, 1890) — Guatemala to Colombia
- Micrathena elongata (Keyserling, 1864) — Colombia
- Micrathena embira Levi, 1985 — Colombia, Brazil
- Micrathena evansi Chickering, 1960 — Panama, Trinidad to Brazil
- Micrathena excavata (C. L. Koch, 1836) — Panama to Brazil
- Micrathena exlinae Levi, 1985 — Peru
- Micrathena fidelis (Banks, 1909) — Costa Rica to Argentina
- Micrathena fissispina (C. L. Koch, 1836) — Brazil, French Guiana
- Micrathena flaveola (Perty, 1839) — Costa Rica to Argentina
- Micrathena forcipata (Thorell, 1859) — Mexico, Cuba, Hispaniola
  - Micrathena forcipata argentata Franganillo, 1930 — Cuba
- Micrathena funebris (Marx, 1898) — USA to Costa Rica
- Micrathena furcata (Hahn, 1822) — Brazil, Argentina, Uruguay
- Micrathena furcula (O. P.-Cambridge, 1890) — Guatemala to Brazil
- Micrathena furva (Keyserling, 1892) — Brazil, Uruguay, Argentina
- Micrathena gaujoni Simon, 1897 — Ecuador, Colombia
- Micrathena glyptogonoides Levi, 1985 — Mexico
- Micrathena gracilis (Walckenaer, 1805) — North, Central America
- Micrathena guayas Levi, 1985 — Ecuador
- Micrathena guerini (Keyserling, 1864) — Colombia
- Micrathena gurupi Levi, 1985 — Brazil, Suriname
- Micrathena hamifera Simon, 1897 — Ecuador to Brazil
- Micrathena horrida (Taczanowski, 1873) — Greater Antilles, Mexico to Argentina
  - Micrathena horrida tuberculata Franganillo, 1930 — Cuba
- Micrathena huanuco Levi, 1985 — Colombia, Peru
- Micrathena jundiai Levi, 1985 — Brazil
- Micrathena kirbyi (Perty, 1833) — Colombia to Brazil
- Micrathena kochalkai Levi, 1985 — Colombia
- Micrathena lata Chickering, 1960 — French Guiana, Brazil
- Micrathena lenca Levi, 1985 — Mexico
- Micrathena lepidoptera Mello-Leitao, 1941 — Costa Rica to Colombia
- Micrathena lindenbergi Mello-Leitao, 1940 — Brazil
- Micrathena lucasi (Keyserling, 1864) — Mexico to Brazil
- Micrathena macfarlanei Chickering, 1961 — Panama to Brazil
- Micrathena margerita Levi, 1985 — Mexico
- Micrathena marta Levi, 1985 — Colombia
- Micrathena miles Simon, 1895 — Brazil, Guyana, Peru
- Micrathena militaris (Fabricius, 1775) — Greater Antilles
- Micrathena mitrata (Hentz, 1850) — USA to Brazil
- Micrathena molesta Chickering, 1961 — Nicaragua to Panama
- Micrathena necopinata Chickering, 1960 — Colombia, Peru, Brazil
- Micrathena nigrichelis Strand, 1908 — Brazil, Paraguay, Uruguay, Argentina
- Micrathena osa (Levi, 1985) — Costa Rica
- Micrathena parallela (O. P.-Cambridge, 1890) — Costa Rica, Panama
- Micrathena patruelis (C. L. Koch, 1839) — Brazil, Paraguay, Argentina
- Micrathena peregrinatorum (Holmberg, 1883) — Brazil, Argentina
- Micrathena petrunkevitchi Levi, 1985 — Mexico
- Micrathena pichincha Levi, 1985 — Ecuador
- Micrathena picta (C. L. Koch, 1836) — Guyana to Paraguay
- Micrathena pilaton Levi, 1985 — Ecuador
- Micrathena plana (C. L. Koch, 1836) — Virgin Islands to Argentina
- Micrathena pungens (Walckenaer, 1841) — Colombia to Bolivia
- Micrathena pupa Simon, 1897 — Colombia, Ecuador
- Micrathena quadriserrata F. O. P.-Cambridge, 1904 — Mexico to Venezuela
- Micrathena raimondi (Taczanowski, 1879) — Peru, Ecuador
- Micrathena reali Levi, 1985 — Brazil
- Micrathena reimoseri Mello-Leitao, 1935 — Brazil
- Micrathena rubicundula (Keyserling, 1864) — Colombia, Ecuador
- Micrathena rufopunctata (Butler, 1873) — Jamaica
- Micrathena ruschii (Mello-Leitao, 1945) — Brazil
- Micrathena saccata (C. L. Koch, 1836) — Honduras to Brazil
- Micrathena sagittata (Walckenaer, 1841) — North, Central America
- Micrathena sanctispiritus Brignoli, 1983 — Brazil
- Micrathena schenkeli Mello-Leitao, 1939 — Trinidad to Paraguay
- Micrathena schreibersi (Perty, 1833) — Nicaragua to Brazil
- Micrathena sexspinosa (Hahn, 1822) — Mexico to Brazil
- Micrathena shealsi Chickering, 1960 — Argentina
- Micrathena similis Bryant, 1945 — Hispaniola
- Micrathena soaresi Levi, 1985 — Brazil
- Micrathena spinosa (Linnaeus, 1758) — Suriname, French Guiana, Brazil
- Micrathena spinulata F. O. P.-Cambridge, 1904 — Mexico
- Micrathena spitzi Mello-Leitao, 1932 — Brazil, Argentina
- Micrathena striata F. O. P.-Cambridge, 1904 — Mexico, Guatemala
- Micrathena stuebeli (Karsch, 1886) — Colombia, Ecuador
- Micrathena swainsoni (Perty, 1833) — Brazil, Paraguay, Argentina
- Micrathena teresopolis Levi, 1985 — Brazil
- Micrathena triangularis (C. L. Koch, 1836) — Trinidad to Brazil
- Micrathena triangularispinosa (De Geer, 1778) — Trinidad to Bolivia
- Micrathena triserrata F. O. P.-Cambridge, 1904 — Mexico to Belize
- Micrathena tziscao Levi, 1985 — Mexico
- Micrathena ucayali Levi, 1985 — Peru, Brazil
- Micrathena vigorsi (Perty, 1833) — Colombia to Brazil
- Micrathena woytkowskii (Levi, 1985) — Peru
- Micrathena yanomami Magalhaes & Santos, 2011 — Brazil
- Micrathena zilchi Kraus, 1955 — Mexico to El Salvador

== Micrepeira ==
Micrepeira Schenkel, 1953

- Micrepeira albomaculata Schenkel, 1953 (type species) — Venezuela
- Micrepeira fowleri Levi, 1995 — Colombia, Ecuador, Peru, Brazil
- Micrepeira hoeferi Levi, 1995 — Peru, Brazil, French Guiana
- Micrepeira pachitea Levi, 1995 — Peru
- Micrepeira smithae Levi, 1995 — Suriname
- Micrepeira tubulofaciens (Hingston, 1932) — Colombia, Guyana, French Guiana
- Micrepeira velso Levi, 1995 — Costa Rica

== Micropoltys ==
Micropoltys Kulczynski, 1911

- Micropoltys baitetensis Smith & Levi, 2010 — New Guinea
- Micropoltys debakkeri Smith & Levi, 2010 — New Guinea, Queensland
- Micropoltys heatherae Smith & Levi, 2010 — Queensland
- Micropoltys placenta Kulczynski, 1911 (type species) — New Guinea

== Milonia ==
Milonia Thorell, 1890

- Milonia albula O. P.-Cambridge, 1899 — Singapore
- Milonia brevipes Thorell, 1890 (type species) — Sumatra
- Milonia hexastigma (Hasselt, 1882) — Sumatra
- Milonia obtusa Thorell, 1892 — Singapore
- Milonia singaeformis (Hasselt, 1882) — Sumatra
- Milonia tomosceles Thorell, 1895 — Myanmar
- Milonia trifasciata Thorell, 1890 — Java, Borneo

== Molinaranea ==
Molinaranea Mello-Leitao, 1940

- Molinaranea clymene (Nicolet, 1849) — Chile, Argentina
- Molinaranea fernandez Levi, 2001 — Juan Fernandez Islands
- Molinaranea magellanica (Walckenaer, 1847) (type species) — Chile, Argentina, Juan Fernandez Islands, Falkland Islands
- Molinaranea mammifera (Tullgren, 1902) — Chile
- Molinaranea phaethontis (Simon, 1896) — Chile, Argentina
- Molinaranea surculorum (Simon, 1896) — Chile
- Molinaranea vildav Levi, 2001 — Chile
