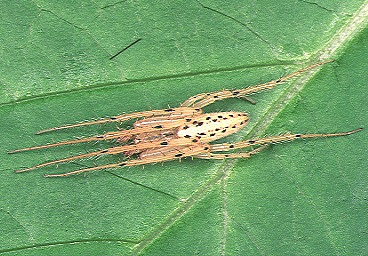

Scientific classification
- Kingdom: Animalia
- Phylum: Arthropoda
- Subphylum: Chelicerata
- Class: Arachnida
- Order: Araneae
- Infraorder: Araneomorphae
- Family: Araneidae
- Genus: Lariniaria; Grasshoff, 1970
- Species: L. argiopiformis

Binomial name
- Lariniaria argiopiformis (Bösenberg & Strand, 1906)

= Lariniaria =

Genus of spiders

Lariniaria is a genus of Asian orb-weaver spiders containing the single species, Lariniaria argiopiformis. It was first described by M. Grasshoff in 1970, and has only been found in Russia, China, Korea, and Japan.

As of January 2026, it was synonymized with the genus Larinia.
