= Metepeira crassipes =

Scientific classification
- Kingdom: Animalia
- Phylum: Arthropoda
- Subphylum: Chelicerata
- Class: Arachnida
- Order: Araneae
- Infraorder: Araneomorphae
- Family: Araneidae
- Genus: Metepeira
- Species: M. crassipes

Binomial name
- Metepeira crassipes Chamberlin & Ivie, 1942

Species of spider

Metepeira crassipes is a species of orb weaver in the spider family Araneidae. It is found in the United States and Mexico.
