= Metepeira comanche =

Scientific classification
- Domain: Eukaryota
- Kingdom: Animalia
- Phylum: Arthropoda
- Subphylum: Chelicerata
- Class: Arachnida
- Order: Araneae
- Infraorder: Araneomorphae
- Family: Araneidae
- Genus: Metepeira
- Species: M. comanche

Binomial name
- Metepeira comanche Levi, 1977

Species of spider

Metepeira comanche is a species of orb weaver in the spider family Araneidae. It is found in the United States and Mexico.
