= Galaporella =

Scientific classification
- Kingdom: Animalia
- Phylum: Arthropoda
- Subphylum: Chelicerata
- Class: Arachnida
- Order: Araneae
- Infraorder: Araneomorphae
- Family: Araneidae
- Genus: Galaporella; Levi, 2009
- Species: G. thaleri

Binomial name
- Galaporella thaleri Levi, 2009

Genus of spiders

Galaporella is a genus of South American orb-weaver spiders containing the single species, Galaporella thaleri. It was first described by Herbert Walter Levi in 2009, and has only been found in the Galápagos Islands.
