= Madacantha =

Scientific classification
- Kingdom: Animalia
- Phylum: Arthropoda
- Subphylum: Chelicerata
- Class: Arachnida
- Order: Araneae
- Infraorder: Araneomorphae
- Family: Araneidae
- Genus: Madacantha; Emerit, 1970
- Species: M. nossibeana

Binomial name
- Madacantha nossibeana (Strand, 1916)

Genus of spiders

Madacantha is a genus of East African orb-weaver spiders containing the single species, Madacantha nossibeana. It was first described by M. Emerit in 1970, and has only been found in Madagascar.
