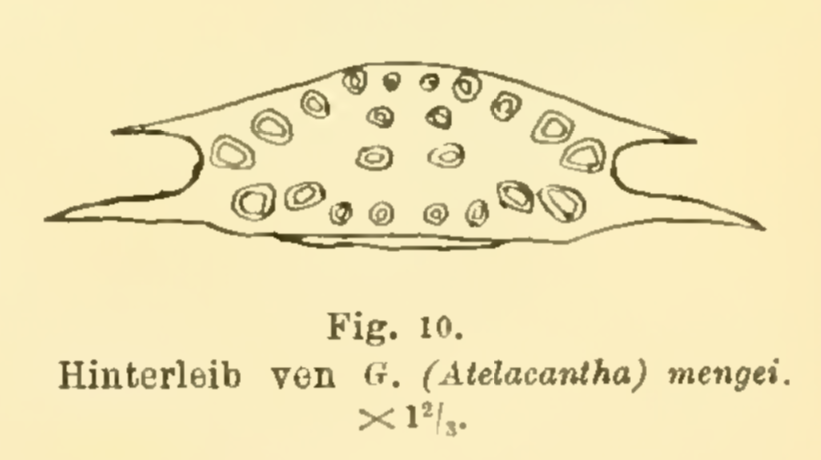

Scientific classification
- Domain: Eukaryota
- Kingdom: Animalia
- Phylum: Arthropoda
- Subphylum: Chelicerata
- Class: Arachnida
- Order: Araneae
- Infraorder: Araneomorphae
- Family: Araneidae
- Genus: Gasteracantha
- Species: G. mengei

Binomial name
- Gasteracantha mengei Keyserling, 1864

Synonyms
- Atelacantha malayensis

= Gasteracantha mengei =

Species of arachnid

Gasteracantha mengei is a species of spider in the spiny orb-weaver genus Gasteracantha. Its range includes Peninsular Malaysia, Singapore, Borneo, and Sumatra in Indonesia.

== Description ==
Female Gasteracantha mengei are distinctive in that they lack rear spines on the abdomen. The abdomen is flat and dark brown in color, and more than twice as wide (about 12.5 mm) as long (about 5.5 mm). The abdomen bears two pairs of spines instead of three pairs, like most other species in the genus. The larger median spines are tapered and angled slightly backward, close to 5 mm each in length. The smaller anterior spines are half to a third of that length and are oriented parallel to the larger spines.

The upper surface of the abdomen fluoresces blue-green under ultraviolet light.

== Similar species ==
G. mengei can be confused with dark brown forms of G. diardi, but G. diardi has prominent spines on the posterior end of the abdomen. These are absent in G. mengei. Additionally, G. diardi has smaller anterior spines that are oriented slightly forward (rather than parallel to the median spines as in G. mengei), and its long median spines often curve slightly downward.
