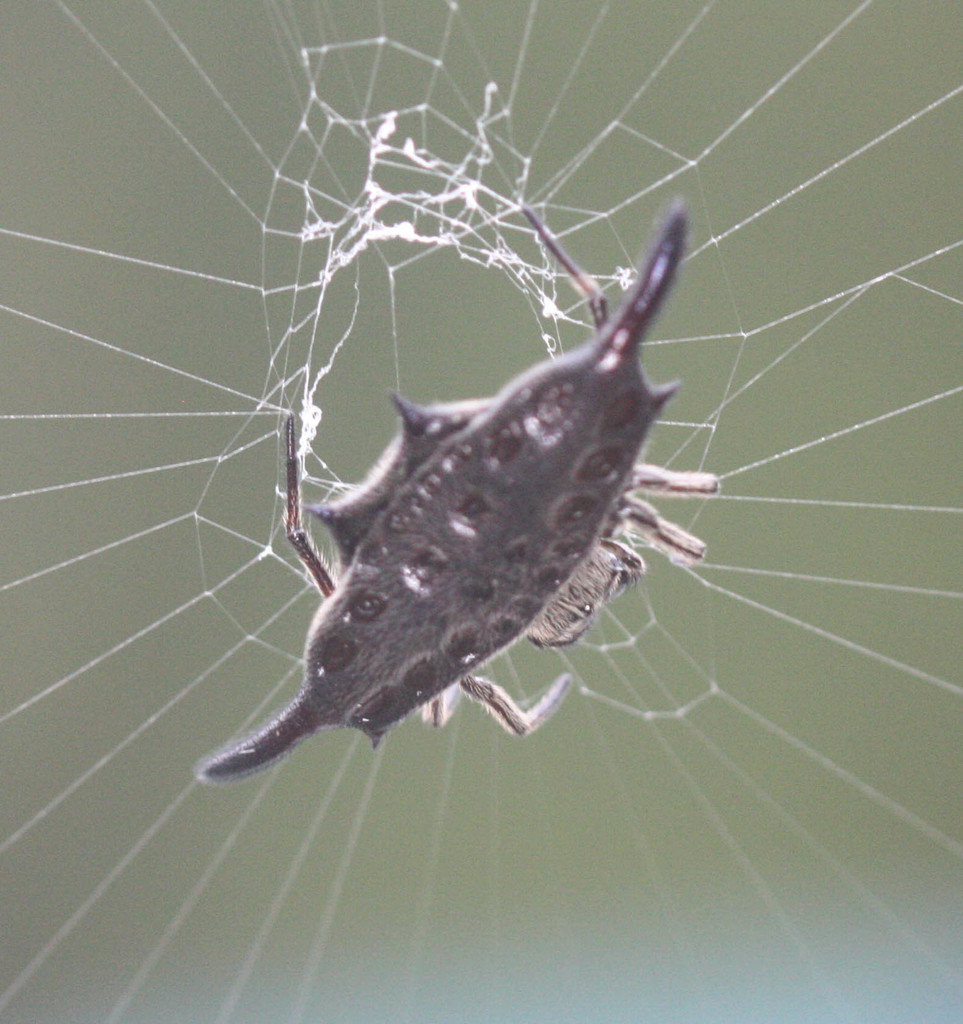

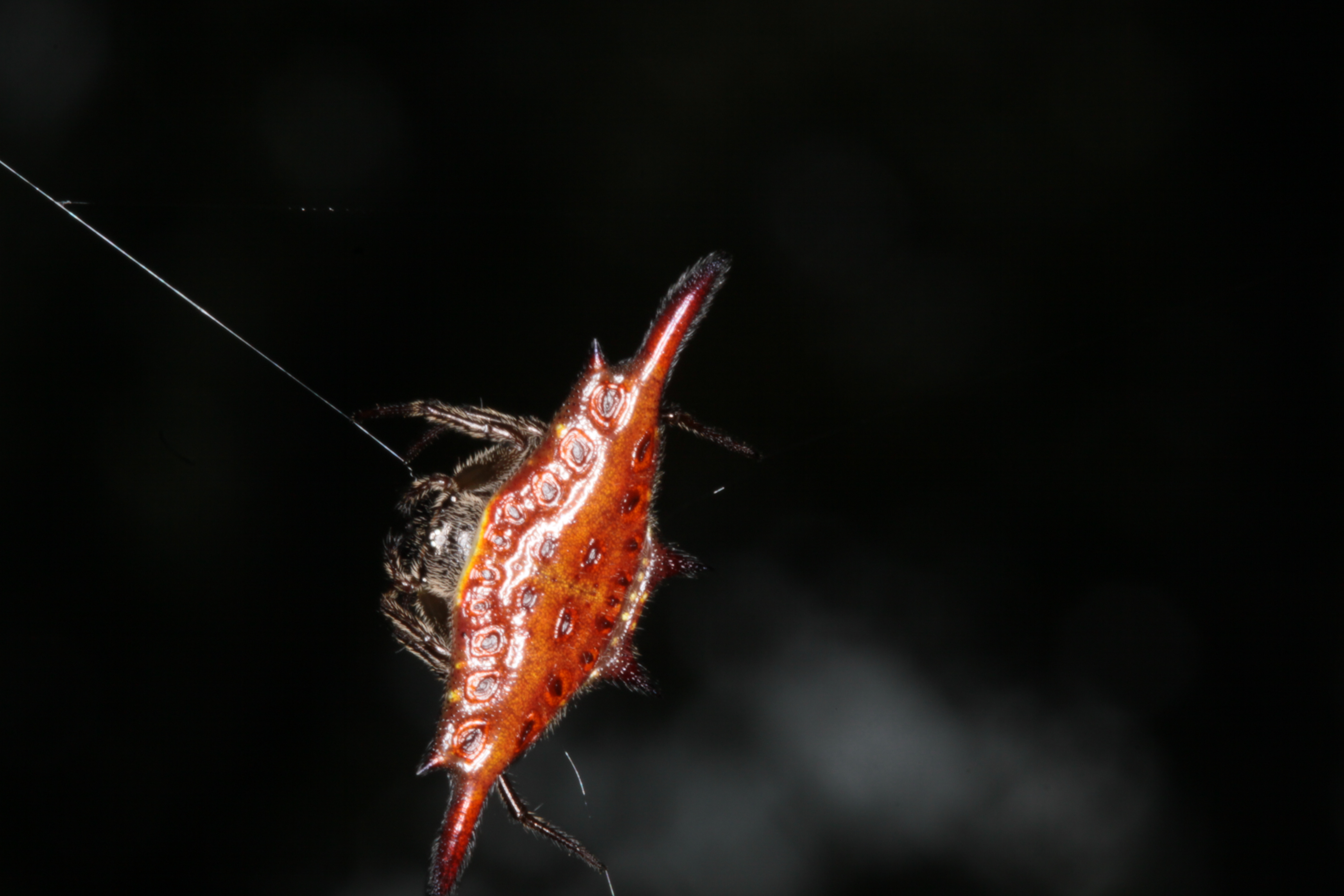

Scientific classification
- Domain: Eukaryota
- Kingdom: Animalia
- Phylum: Arthropoda
- Subphylum: Chelicerata
- Class: Arachnida
- Order: Araneae
- Infraorder: Araneomorphae
- Family: Araneidae
- Genus: Gasteracantha
- Species: G. diardi

Binomial name
- Gasteracantha diardi (Lucas, 1835)

= Gasteracantha diardi =

Species of arachnid

Gasteracantha diardi is a species of spider in the spiny orb-weaver genus Gasteracantha. It occurs in Southeast Asia.

== Distribution ==
The range of Gasteracantha diardi includes southern China, Thailand, Singapore, Malaysia, Borneo, and other Sunda Islands in Indonesia.

== Description ==
Females of the species have very wide abdomens, much wider than long, giving them a horizontal appearance that is further accentuated by their spines. They have three pairs of spines on the abdomen. The first (anterior) pair is usually small and conical. The second (median) pair is long and strong, generally horizontal but often curving slightly backward and downward or even slightly forward. The hind pair of spines is always well-developed and intermediate in length between the first two pairs. Adult females are usually dark red or brown and can show pale yellowish or whitish stripes horizontally across the upper surface of the abdomen (example from Thailand).

The upper surface of the abdomen fluoresces blue under ultraviolet light.

== Similar species ==
G. diardi can be confused with G. mengei, which lacks hind spines and has longer, straighter anterior spines and straight, tapering median spines. The two species overlap on the Greater Sundas, Peninsular Malaysia, and Singapore. G. diardi can also be confused with G. doriae, which is brown with light stripes and has a slightly longer abdomen than G. diardi (creating a rounder silhouette), forward-pointing anterior spines, and median spines that are thin, relatively short, and curved somewhat back.

Because G. diardi is widespread and variable, it has numerous synonyms, most of which were brought together by zoologist Friedrich Dahl in 1914 based on his examination of specimens at the Natural History Museum, Berlin.
