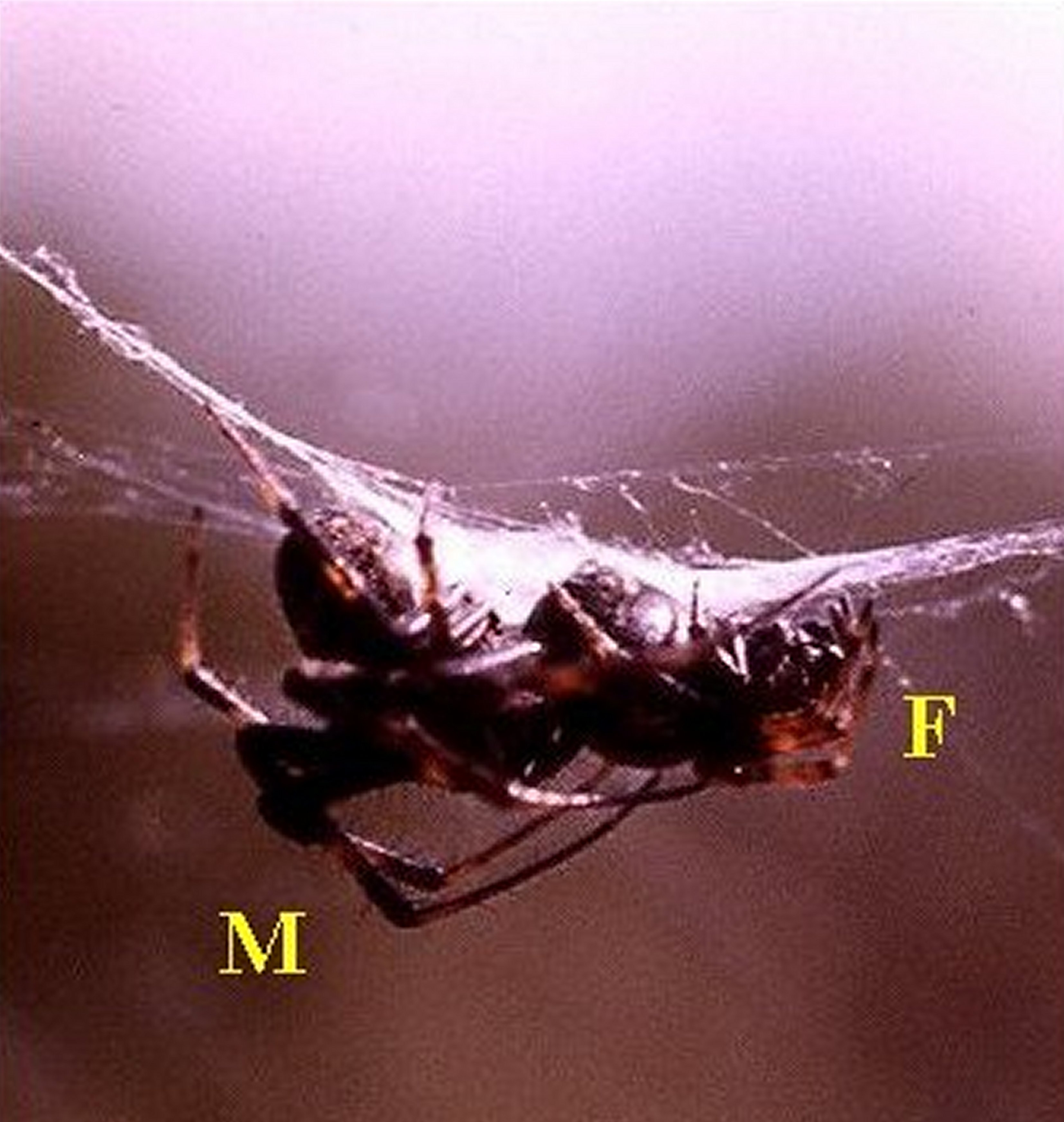

Scientific classification
- Kingdom: Animalia
- Phylum: Arthropoda
- Subphylum: Chelicerata
- Class: Arachnida
- Order: Araneae
- Infraorder: Araneomorphae
- Family: Araneidae
- Genus: Metepeira
- Species: M. incrassata

Binomial name
- Metepeira incrassata F. O. Pickard-Cambridge, 1903

= Metepeira incrassata =

Spider

Metepeira incrassata, also known as the colonial orb-weaving spider, belongs to the spider family Araneidae and genus Metepeira. They are most famous for their social organization and group living behavior. They are generally found in tropical rainforest and agricultural sites in Mexico, and their habitats tend to be highly productive (high generation rate of biomass). Their group sizes are relatively larger than other colonial spiders, typically ranging from hundreds to thousands of individuals. 99% of the females are observed to participate in colonial living, generally with at least two other individuals. Because most M. incrassata females are communal, the colonies are often dominated by larger males. There is minimal sexual dimorphism observed in M. incrassata. Unlike other orb-weaver spiders, M. incrassata builds a colonial web by connecting each spider's individual webs together through semi-permanent framelines. These colonial webs of M. incrassata are prone to invasion by kleptoparasitic (prey theft) and araneophagic spiders such as the Theridiidae family. The reproductive cycle of M. incrassata occurs throughout the entire year, with multiple generations sharing the same time period. Within their colonies, M. incrassata is seen to change locations. Larger, fertile females with egg sacs prefer to reside in the central area of the group for increased protection from predators, while the younger spiders are mostly found in peripheral positions. Larger adult M. incrassata are also known to finish web-building earlier than smaller ones, gaining an advantage in strategically positioning themselves.

== Description ==
Unlike the rest of Araneidae, the spiders of the American genus Metepeira are noted for their unique light eye region, white median line on their sternum, relative length of the leg segments, small male palpus (appendages of chelicerates), and the weakly sclerotized (hardened) epigynum in females.

Metepeira incrassata possess a distinctive internal organ called coxal glands, a structure known to be present in select arthropods for the collection and excretion of urine. The coxal glands in the genus M. incrassata show relatively poor development compared to other Araneidae. Though the coxal glands resemble a sensory organ called the “pharyngeal taste organ," the coxal glands are not sensory in their function.

=== Sexual dimorphism ===
Unlike many other spider species, M. incrassata shows little sexual dimorphism. Dimorphism is typically more prevalent in spiders who have to search for widely distributed females and consequently face a higher male mortality rate. Because M. incrassata engages in group living in large colonies where females tend to be much more accessible, M. incrassata males are not forced to travel large distances in search of females, and thus show relatively low male mortality and sexual dimorphism.

== Habitat ==
Metepeira incrassata can be found in mid-elevation tropical rainforest and/or agricultural sites, most notably in Mexico. Specifically, it has been located in Fortin de las Flores, Veracruz, where there is a plethora of insects and pleasant weather all year round, with the temperature only fluctuating between 20-32 °C daily. The habitat of other Metepeira spiders, such as M. atascadero, includes desert and grassland sites. In contrast, the habitat for M. incrassata tends to be moist tropical forest vegetation with banana and coffee plantations, with high rainfall ranging from 170–220 cm per year and high humidity (68-99%). The tendency of M. incrassata to reside in warmer tropical habitats contributes to the multiple occurrences of the spider throughout the year.

Metepeira incrassata can also be observed to live in highly productive habitats, which refers to the rate of generation of biomass in an ecosystem. Its high productivity compared to its relatives may be attributed to most females being communal.

== Reproduction ==
M. incrassata reproduces continuously throughout the year, unlike other Metepeira spiders who reproduce only once a year. All M. incrassata colonies, with the exception of the very new ones, contain some females with egg sacs. The responsibility of guarding these egg sacs is a huge risk for M. incrassata, and the egg-sac predators such as Arachnidomyia lindae serve as a significant cause of mortality of M. incrassata.

== Behavior ==
=== Group living ===
One of the most notable behaviors observed in M. incrassata is group living. Unlike other Metepeira spiders, M. incrassata is known to form larger colonies, ranging from few hundreds to thousands of individual spiders. Rather than a single generation dominating each year, multiple generations of M. incrassata overlap throughout the year due to its multiple reproductive cycles. Other species of orb-weavers can be observed to coexist within and on the edges of the M. incrassta colonies, such as Micrathena gracilis (Araneidae), Gasteracantha cancriformis (Araneidae), Leucauge sp. (Tetragnathidae), Mecynogea sp. (Araneidae), and Nephila clavipes.

Within each group, each spider is strategically positioned, with fertile adult females residing in the center for maximal protection. Younger spiders that are at a lower capture risk from the predators typically outline the periphery of the group. In other words, the large adult females who are responsible for reproduction are prioritized in terms of level of protection within the colony. The smaller individuals in the periphery are better equipped to forage and receive less protection from the predators. Interestingly, however, they tend to be at a lower risk from the predators overall. Larger group size is associated with greater rates of parasitism, increasing the cost per egg loss. However, this cost is often offset by higher foraging success found in bigger groups, as well as enhanced level of protection per individual.

M. incrassata tends to engage in sedentary living in relatively fixed locations. It uses vibration to detect prey and communicate, and the average reaction distance of M. incrassata is seen to increase with greater colony size. Most importantly, M. incrassata uses the ‘early warning system’ that detects the web-borne vibrations from the predators and the evasive behavior of other spiders to perceive danger. This antipredator defense mechanism is one of the greatest benefits of the colonial living style of M. incrassata.

== Webs ==
Unlike solitary web-building spiders, colonial orb weavers like M. incrassata create a communal web framework by piecing individual webs together using semi-permanent framelines. Each spider builds and occupies its own web. There is a positive correlation between the size of the colony and the interconnectedness of the web: the larger the colony is, the more connected the individual webs are. The interconnectedness of the webs is the most significant in the core as webs span multiple different directions. The silk webs bound together are often utilized as a defense mechanism for M. incrassata to detect an approaching predator.

M. incrassata displays an age-related sequence of daily web building, with larger spiders finishing their webs at a much faster rate. In M. incrassata, web-building tends to be triggered by spatial needs, and mature reproductive females with egg sacs typically build their webs much earlier than females of equal size without egg sacs. This characteristic sequential web building allows for a hierarchical size distribution within the colony, where larger spiders fight for more space between themselves, and smaller spiders attempt to protect themselves during web construction and not be disturbed like the larger spiders. It also prevents unnecessary fights for optimal positions on the web on a daily basis.

On top of protection against the predators, the orb webs of M. incrassata are also used for foraging, breeding, attaching egg sacs, and interacting with neighbors. The webs are rebuilt every day, often in the same location. The rearrangement of the positions of spiders within the web, specifically as the young spiders on the periphery mature, adds a dynamic nature to the orb webs of M. incrassata. Web sizes typically increase with the spider size, and larger webs take a greater amount of time to build.

== Enemies ==
=== Predators ===
Metepeira incrassata is often preyed on by wasps from multiple different families. Wasps tend to attack more than one spider per colony when hunting, which can be especially deadly to spiders that exhibit social behavior. Furthermore, larger colonies are observed to encounter wasp predators more frequently than smaller colonies. However, M. incrassata has been seen to utilize defense mechanisms unique to spiders that engage in group living against its predators. With its ability to detect and distinguish between airborne and web-born vibrations, M. incrassata may be able to sense predators by wingbeat frequency with the aid of interconnected silk webbing networks. In particular, M. incrassata exhibits egg defense behaviors against predatory fly Arachnidomyia lindae by recognizing the wingbeat frequency of the predator. A. lindae hunts for M. incrassata by mimicking the vibrations of captured prey on the orb-web. In guarding their egg sacs against A. lindae, M. incrassata is seen to adopt a counterploy behavior where they cut the signal line connecting the egg-sac and the hub of the orb-web. Once the signal line is cut, M. incrassata is immune to any distracting vibration from A. lindae and can thus successfully protect its egg sacs.

=== Parasites ===
Metepeira incrassata is also often targeted by kleptoparasitic (prey stealing) spiders and araneophagic (spider-eating) spiders who occupy its colonial webs. Similar to increased frequency of predation with larger colonies, the incidence of these kleptoparasitic and araneophagic spiders (Araneae: Family Theridiidae, Subfamily Argyrodinae) are seen to increase with colony size. While solely kleptoparasitic spiders may only affect M. incrassata by reducing the prey availability, the kleptoparasitic and araneophagic spiders have a more direct impact on the M. incrassata population as they can increase the mortality rate. Thus, the increased occurrence of these parasites to the colonial webs of M. incrassata from larger colonies serve as an example of the detrimental cost of group living.
