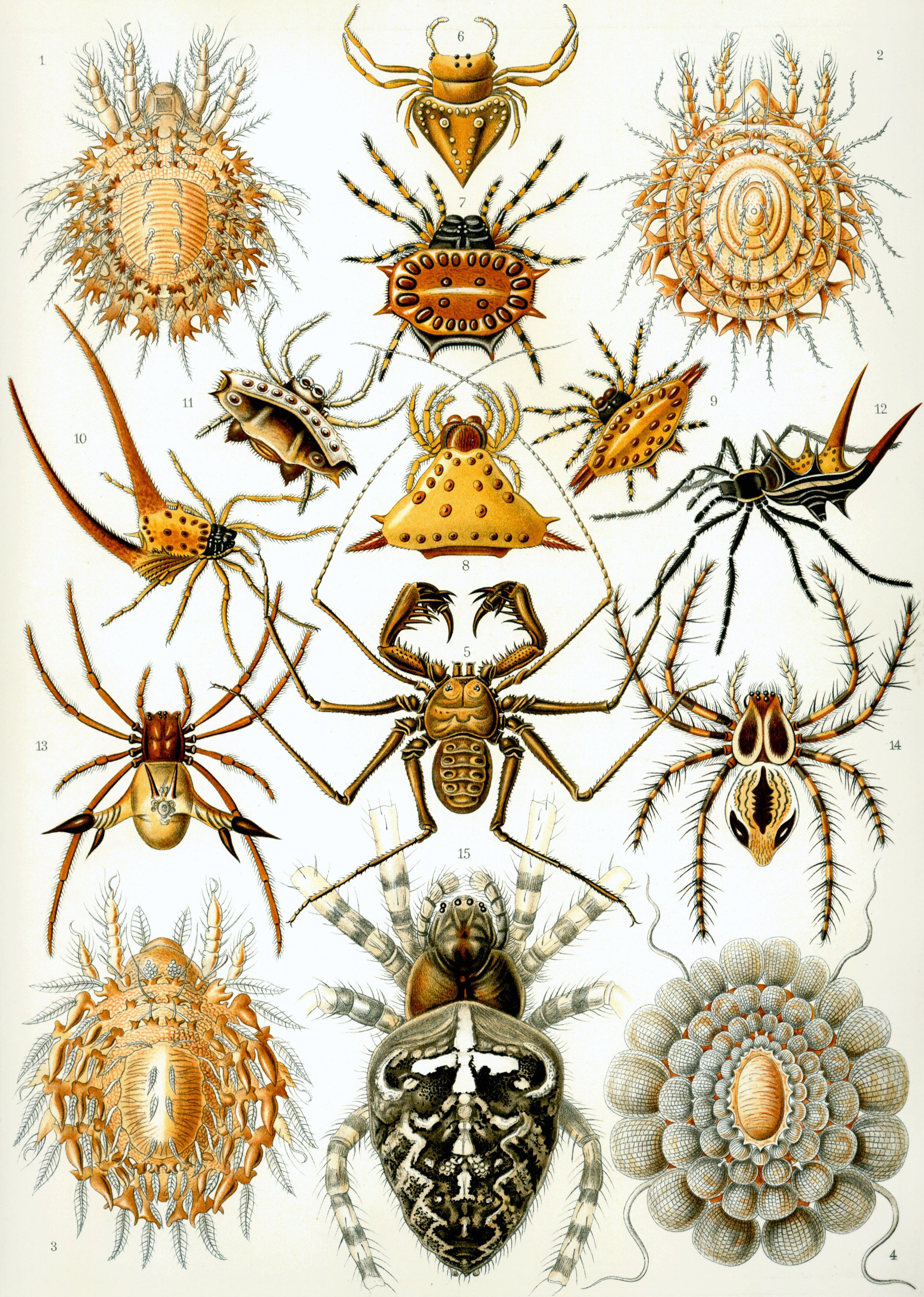
- G. cordiformis (top center)

Scientific classification
- Kingdom: Animalia
- Phylum: Arthropoda
- Subphylum: Chelicerata
- Class: Arachnida
- Order: Araneae
- Infraorder: Araneomorphae
- Family: Araneidae
- Genus: Gnolus; Simon, 1879

Type species
- G. cordiformis (Nicolet, 1849)

Species
- 6, see text

= Gnolus =

Genus of spiders

Gnolus is a genus of South American orb-weaver spiders that was first described by Eugène Louis Simon in 1879. Originally placed with the orb-weaving spiders, it was transferred to the pirate spiders in 1993, but moved back to orb-weaver family in 2012.

== Species ==
As of November 2026 it contains six species, found in Argentina and Chile:

- Gnolus angulifrons Simon, 1896 – Chile, Argentina
- Gnolus blinkeni Platnick & Shadab, 1993 – Chile, Argentina
- Gnolus cordiformis (Nicolet, 1849) (type) – Chile, Argentina
- Gnolus limbatus (Nicolet, 1849) – Chile
- Gnolus spiculator (Nicolet, 1849) – Chile, Argentina
- Gnolus zonulatus Tullgren, 1902 – Chile, Argentina

In synonymy:

- G. affinis Tullgren, 1902 = Gnolus cordiformis (Nicolet, 1849)
