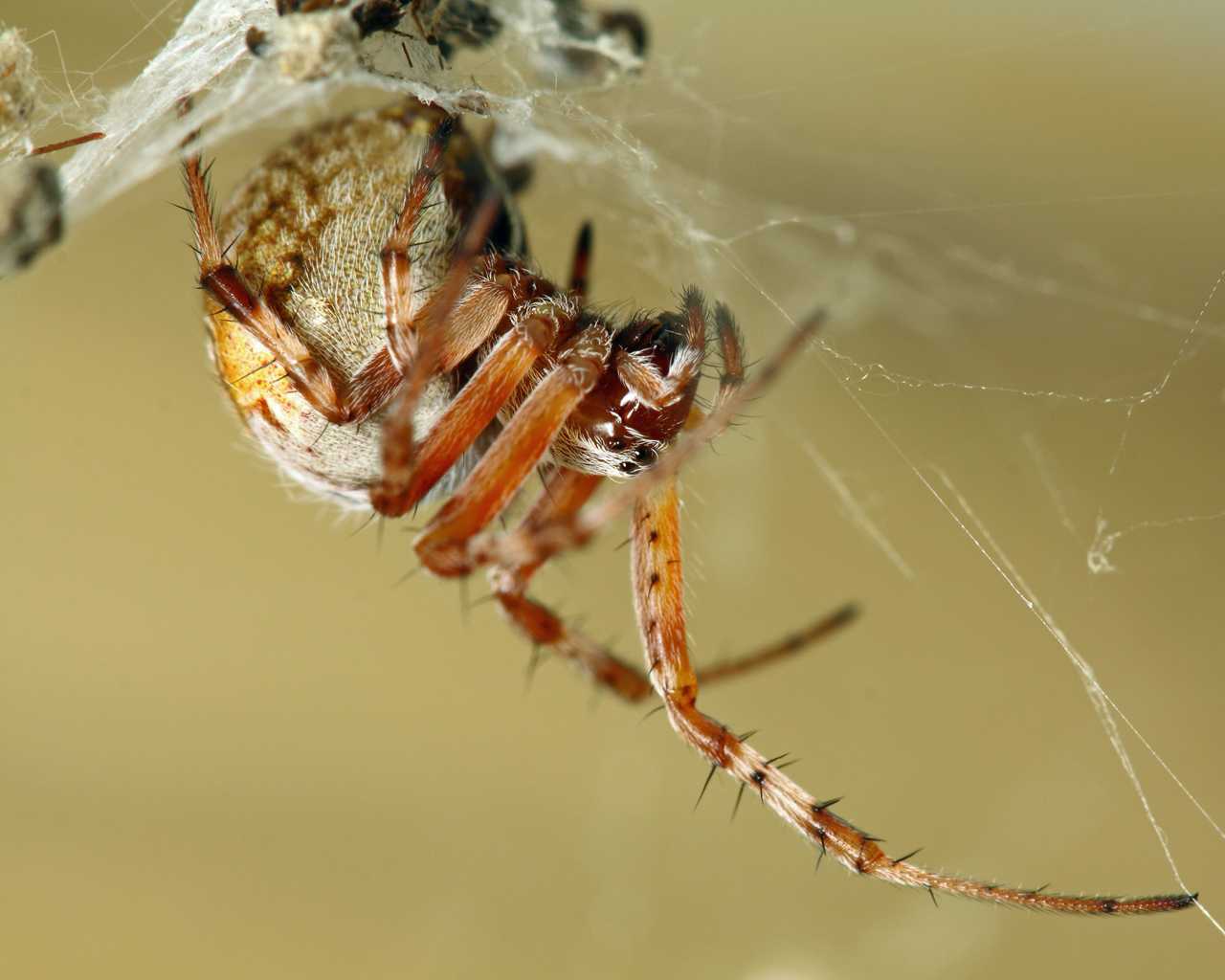

Scientific classification
- Kingdom: Animalia
- Phylum: Arthropoda
- Subphylum: Chelicerata
- Class: Arachnida
- Order: Araneae
- Infraorder: Araneomorphae
- Family: Araneidae
- Genus: Metepeira
- Species: M. labyrinthea

Binomial name
- Metepeira labyrinthea (Hentz, 1847)

Synonyms
- Epeira labyrinthea; Epeira crucifera; Epeira solitudinis; Araneus labyrintheus; Araneus cruciferus; Araneus solitudinis; Aranea keyserlingi

= Metepeira labyrinthea =

Species of spider

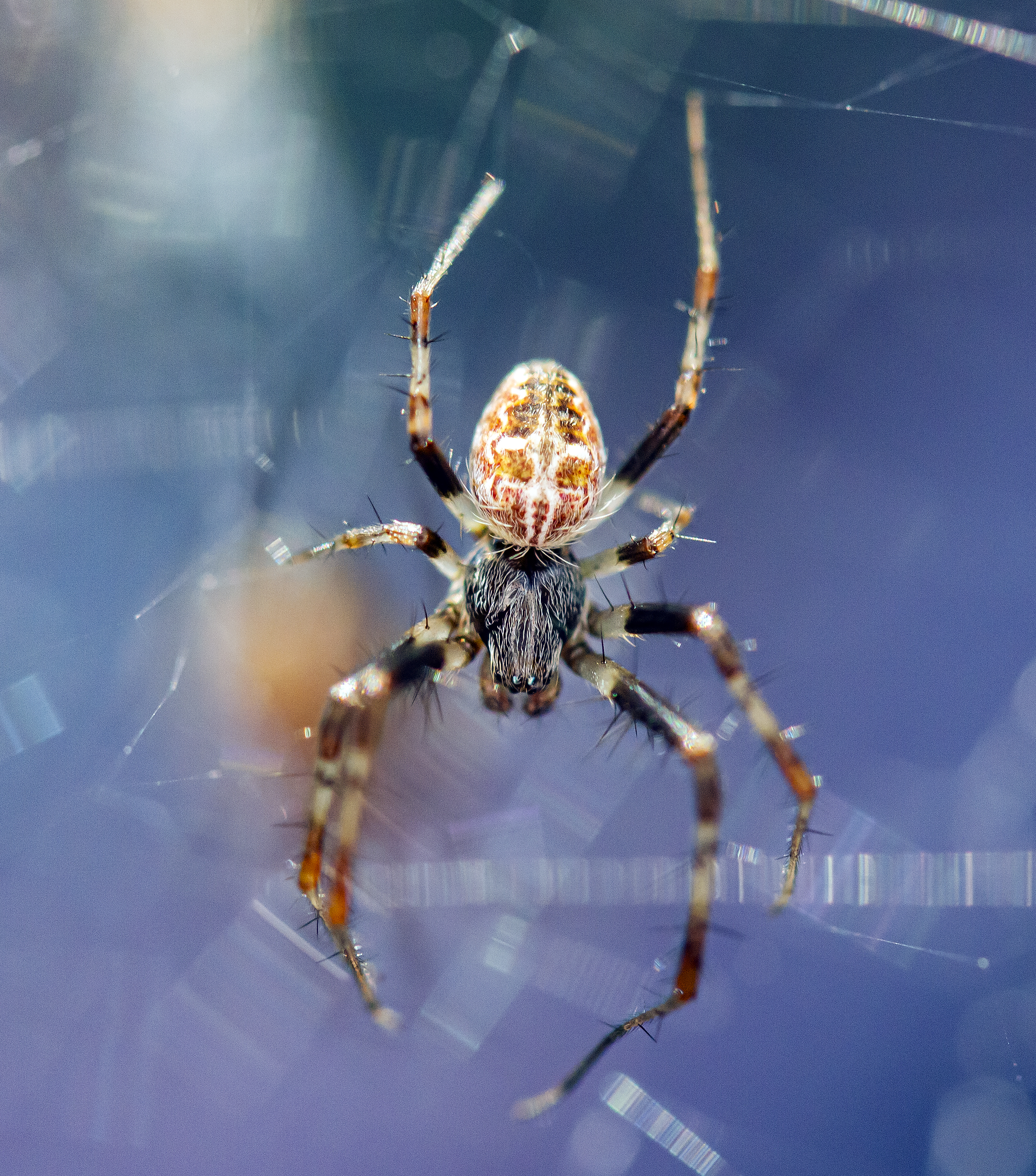
Labyrinth Orbweaver (Metepeira labyrinthea) male

Metepeira labyrinthea, the labyrinth orbweaver, is a spider, with thin legs and a round, bulbous abdomen It is a member of the genus Metepeira in the family Araneidae. The female’s length is 5.3 mm, its carapace 2.3 mm, abdomen 3.3 mm, and extended legs 18.4 mm. The carapace is brown or gray, and the abdomen is dark with a white pattern. The legs alternate pale brown and dark brown, and the sternum is dark brown with a longitudinal yellow mark. The male spider is three-quarters of the female’s length, or slightly larger, with a darker carapace and with greater contrast between dark and light areas of the legs. Metepeira are easily distinguished from other Araneidae by their light eye region, white median line on the sternum, relative length of the leg segments, small male palpus, weakly sclerotized epigyne and the special composite web.

== Web ==
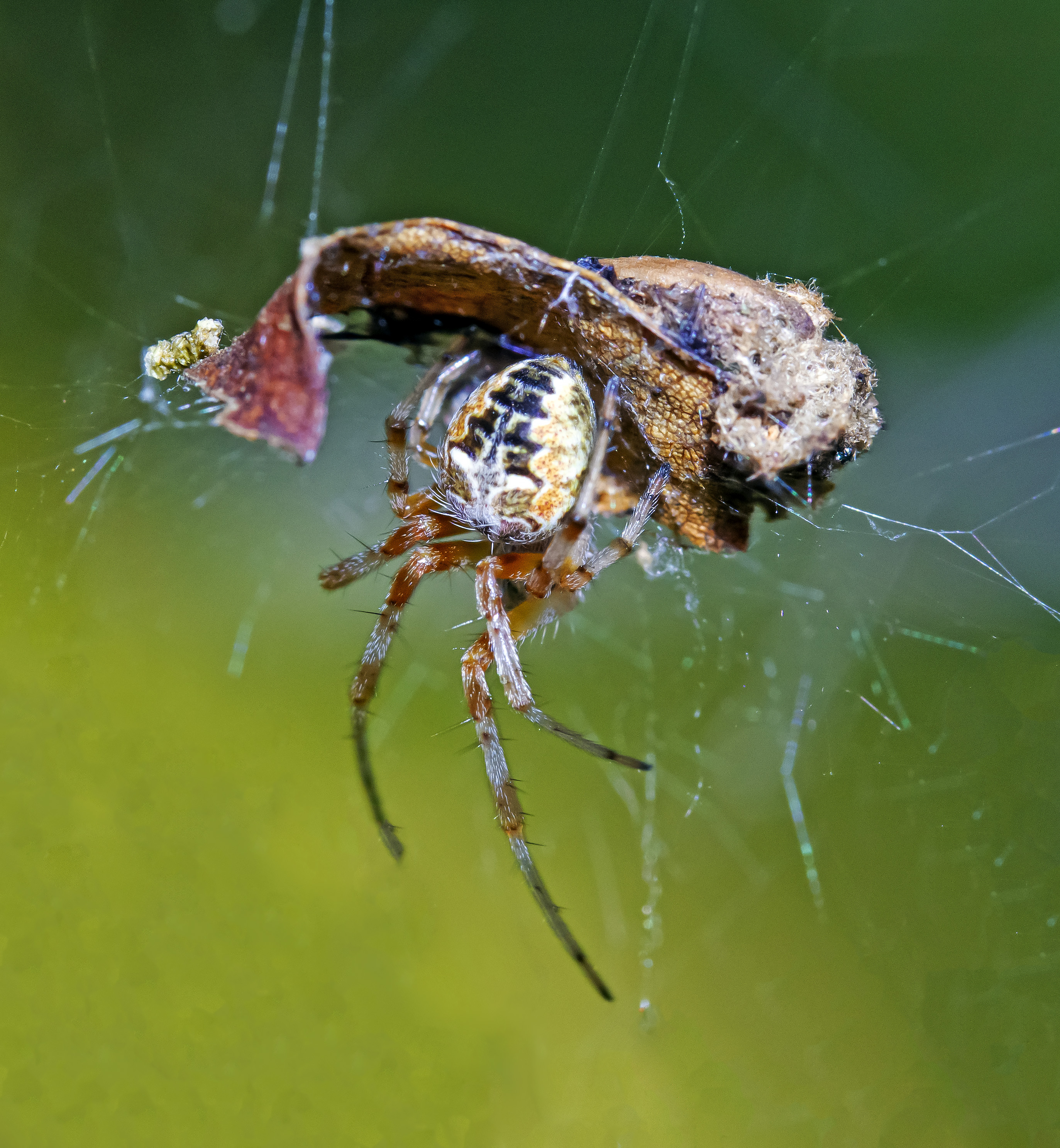
Labyrinth Orbweaver spider in its retreat

In the webs of some spiders the viscid thread turns in very few, if any, spiral turns; most of the thread is looped back and forth along the radius. This is shown in the web of Meteperia labyrinthea. A web of this kind is termed an incomplete orb. The web of the labyrinth spider is highly characteristic and is more easily recognizable than the spider itself. The web consists of both an orb web and an irregular web. The orb web is built below and in front of an irregular web, where a retreat for the spider is created. This retreat is a tangled, knotted web made with some debris and leaves woven into the silk, placed so as to make a small tent for the spider. After attaining maturity, the male makes no orb web.

== Habitat ==
The labyrinth orbweaver can be found in most of the United States, southward through the Neotropics to Argentina. It is locally common in places of open woodland or woodland edge, and the webs are usually 3 to 8 feet above the ground. Orange trees, which have many dead and bare lower branches, provide places for the webs in thorny clusters of twigs. The spiders seem to be somewhat of a colonist, with many living in the same tree, sometimes with their webs only a few inches apart.

== Food ==
Like many other spiders, the labyrinth spider is a predator that uses the orb portion of its web to ensnare prey. It is a passive hunter that lets the web do the work. One or more trap lines extend from the retreat to the orb web. The sticky prey capture threads of orb-webs are critical to web performance. By retaining insects that strike the web, these spirally designed threads allow a spider time to locate their prey. When an insect becomes entangled in the web, the spider climbs down to reach it from the trap line and ties it up in the web. If the spider is in need of food immediately, the insect is taken back to the retreat where the soft parts of the animal are eaten and the remaining parts thrown from the web.

In June 1980, a field experiment was performed in Patuxent Wildlife Research Center, Prince George's County, Maryland, to determine if food is a limiting resource for adult females of Metepeira labyrinthea. Spiders built webs after being added to open experimental units, half of which were exposed to natural prey densities, while the other spiders were given laboratory-reared flies to increase prey availability. Feeding continued like this for 2.5 months and at the end of the experiment all egg sacs were removed from the units. Additional prey did not increase the survival rate of the spiders; however, the species responded to additional prey by significantly increasing the number of eggs produced per female. Median egg production per female increased from 65 to 145 for M. labyrinthea. This indicated that food was a limited resource for this species.

== Life cycle ==
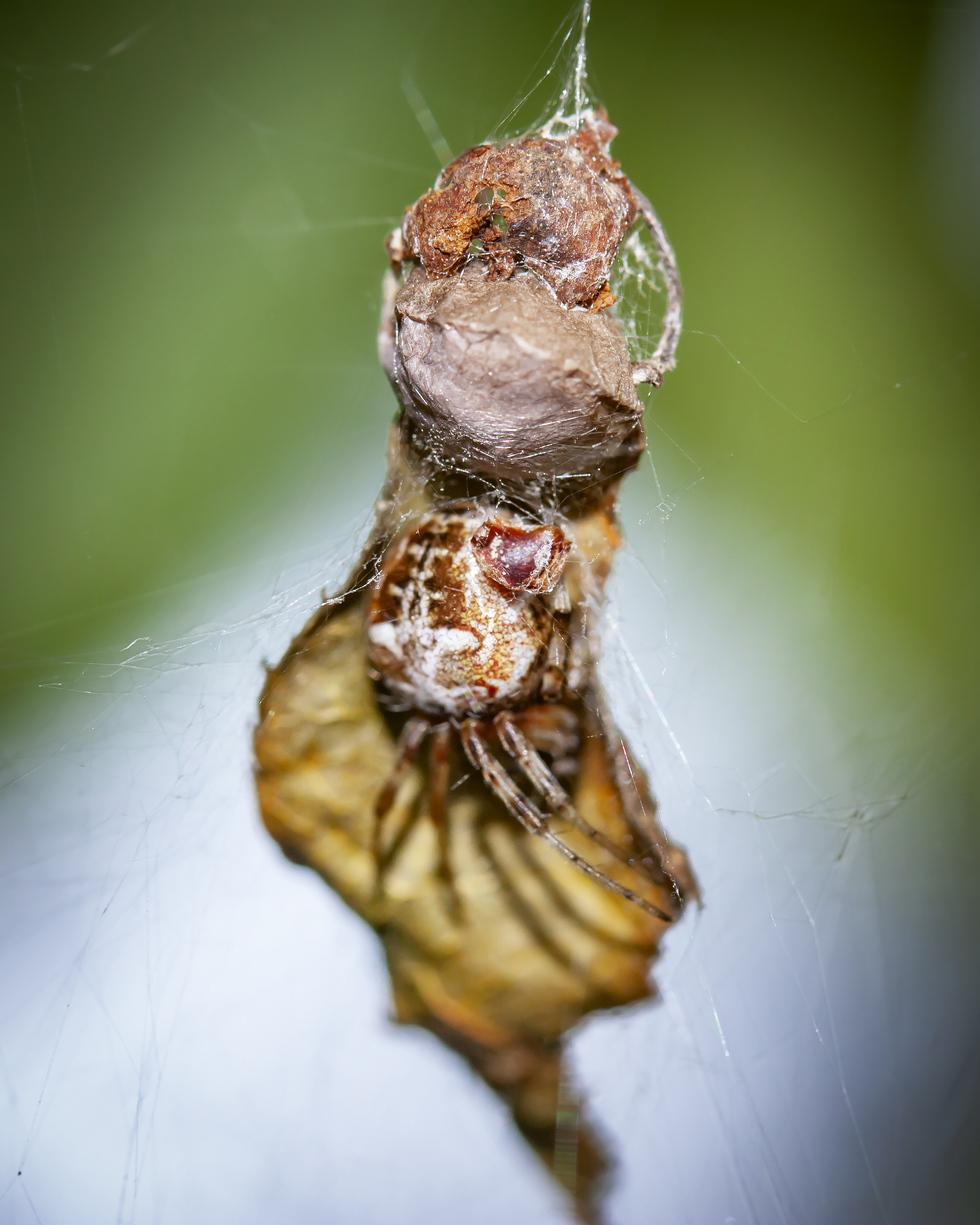
Female in retreat with egg sac

The labyrinth spider is active, with its webs visible, from March through October. During the rainy season, the female mates and lays eggs. The female usually produces 5 or 6 egg sacs with an average of 55 eggs each. She puts her eggs into several silken discs strung together in a bead-like row, and then builds an egg case around the eggs and hangs it in the web near her retreat, where it is camouflaged by other debris in her web. Once the young emerge they are self-sufficient; they leave the mother's nest by ballooning.
