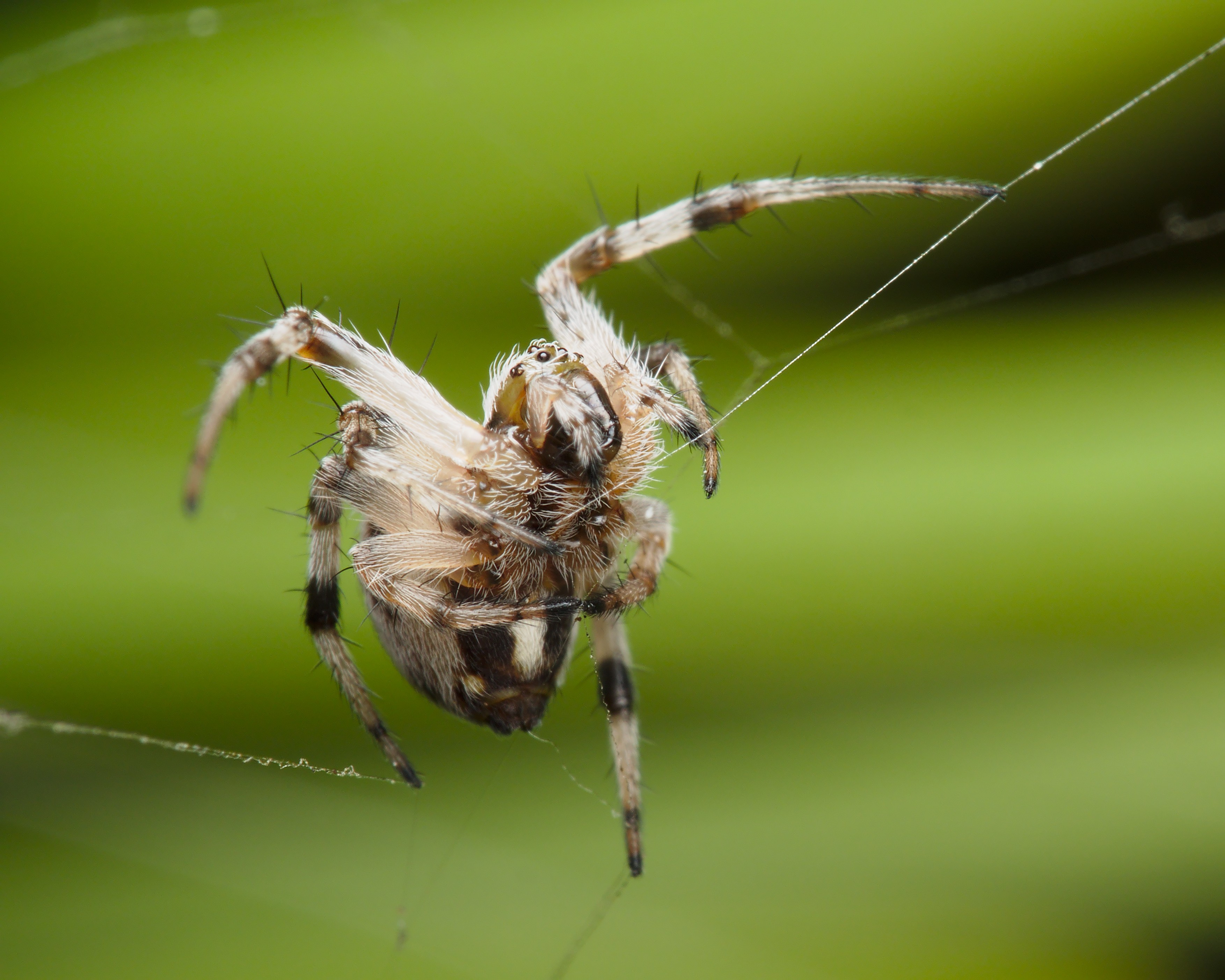
- Metepeira sp.
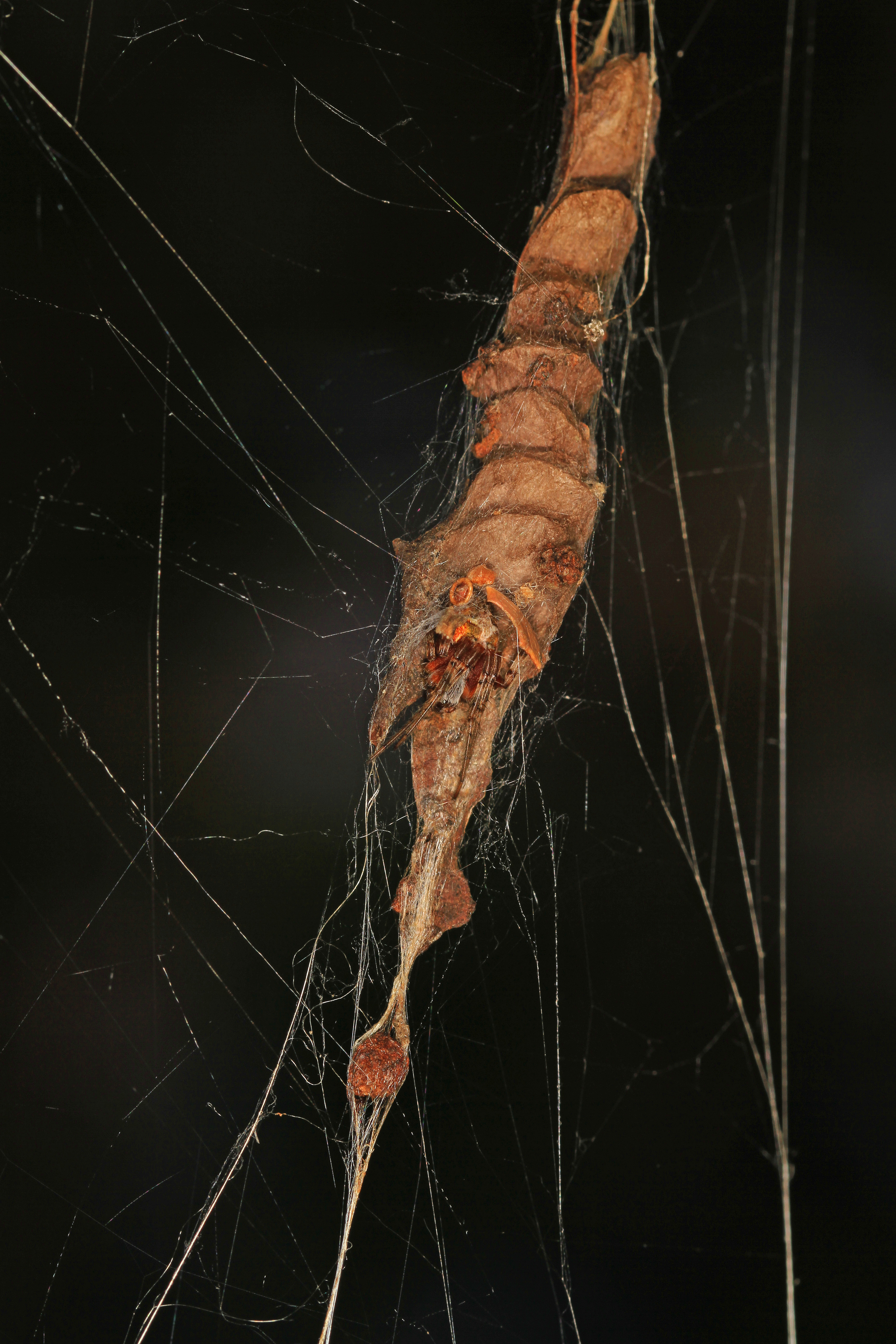
- M. labyrinthea, hiding in its labyrinth

Scientific classification
- Kingdom: Animalia
- Phylum: Arthropoda
- Subphylum: Chelicerata
- Class: Arachnida
- Order: Araneae
- Infraorder: Araneomorphae
- Family: Araneidae
- Genus: Metepeira; F. O. Pickard-Cambridge, 1903

Type species
- M. spinipes F. O. Pickard-Cambridge, 1903

Species
- 44, see text

= Metepeira =

Genus of spiders

Metepeira is a genus of orb-weaver spiders first described by F. O. Pickard-Cambridge in 1903. The name is derived from the Ancient Greek μετά and the obsolete genus name Epeira, denoting a genus similar to Epeira.

== Species ==
As of November 2026 it contains forty-four species found from Argentina to Canada, including Caribbean islands:

- Metepeira arizonica Chamberlin & Ivie, 1942 – USA, Mexico
- Metepeira atascadero Piel, 2001 – Mexico
- Metepeira bengryi (Archer, 1958) – Jamaica
- Metepeira brunneiceps Caporiacco, 1954 – French Guiana
- Metepeira cajabamba Piel, 2001 – Ecuador, Peru
- Metepeira calamuchita Piel, 2001 – Argentina
- Metepeira celestun Piel, 2001 – Mexico
- Metepeira chilapae Chamberlin & Ivie, 1936 – Mexico
- Metepeira comanche Levi, 1977 – USA, Mexico
- Metepeira compsa (Chamberlin, 1916) – Puerto Rico to Argentina
- Metepeira crassipes Chamberlin & Ivie, 1942 – USA, Mexico
- Metepeira datona Chamberlin & Ivie, 1942 – USA, Caribbean
- Metepeira desenderi Baert, 1987 – Galapagos
- Metepeira foxi Gertsch & Ivie, 1936 – USA, Canada
- Metepeira galatheae (Thorell, 1891) – Chile, Argentina
- Metepeira glomerabilis (Keyserling, 1892) – Colombia to Paraguay, Brazil
- Metepeira gosoga Chamberlin & Ivie, 1935 – USA, Mexico
- Metepeira grandiosa Chamberlin & Ivie, 1941 – North America
- Metepeira gressa (Keyserling, 1892) – Brazil, Paraguay, Uruguay, Argentina
- Metepeira inca Piel, 2001 – Peru
- Metepeira incrassata F. O. Pickard-Cambridge, 1903 – Mexico
- Metepeira jamaicensis Archer, 1958 – Hispaniola, Jamaica, Grand Cayman Islands
- Metepeira karkii (Tullgren, 1901) – Chile, Argentina
- Metepeira labyrinthea (Hentz, 1847) – North America
- Metepeira lacandon Piel, 2001 – Mexico
- Metepeira lima Chamberlin & Ivie, 1942 – Peru
- Metepeira maya Piel, 2001 – Mexico to Costa Rica
- Metepeira minima Gertsch, 1936 – USA to Honduras
- Metepeira nigriventris (Taczanowski, 1878) – Peru, Bolivia
- Metepeira olmec Piel, 2001 – Mexico to Panama
- Metepeira pacifica Piel, 2001 – Honduras, Nicaragua, Costa Rica
- Metepeira palustris Chamberlin & Ivie, 1942 – USA, Canada
- Metepeira petatlan Piel, 2001 – Mexico
- Metepeira pimungan Piel, 2001 – USA
- Metepeira rectangula (Nicolet, 1849) – Chile, Argentina
- Metepeira revillagigedo Piel, 2001 – Mexico
- Metepeira roraima Piel, 2001 – Colombia, Brazil, Guyana
- Metepeira spinipes F. O. Pickard-Cambridge, 1903 – USA, Mexico
- Metepeira tarapaca Piel, 2001 – Peru, Chile
- Metepeira triangularis (Franganillo, 1930) – Cuba, Hispaniola
- Metepeira uncata F. O. Pickard-Cambridge, 1903 – Guatemala to Costa Rica
- Metepeira ventura Chamberlin & Ivie, 1942 – USA, Mexico
- Metepeira vigilax (Keyserling, 1893) – Hispaniola, Bolivia, Brazil, Argentina
- Metepeira ypsilonota Mello-Leitão, 1940 – Brazil
