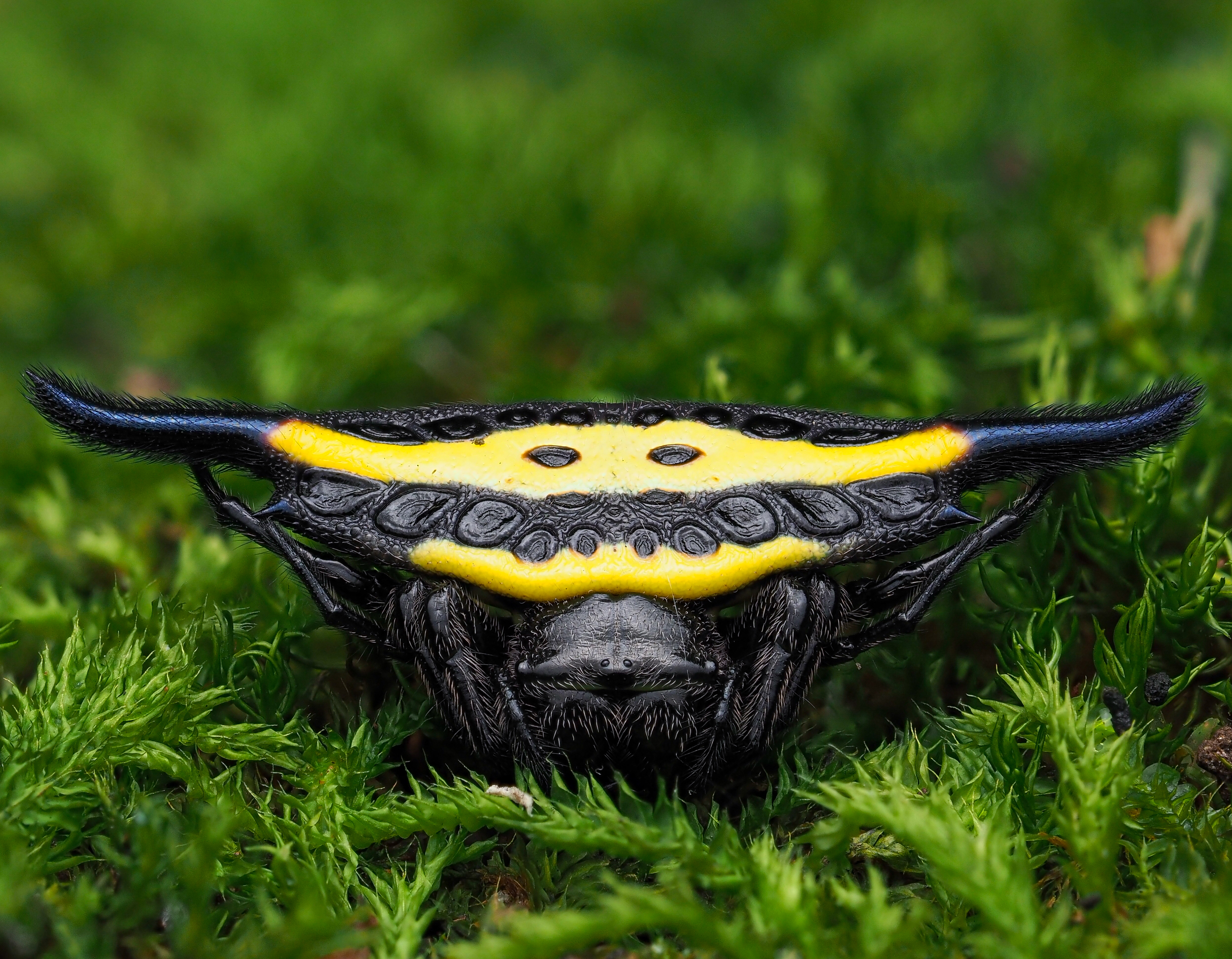

Scientific classification
- Domain: Eukaryota
- Kingdom: Animalia
- Phylum: Arthropoda
- Subphylum: Chelicerata
- Class: Arachnida
- Order: Araneae
- Infraorder: Araneomorphae
- Family: Araneidae
- Genus: Gasteracantha
- Species: G. hecata

Binomial name
- Gasteracantha hecata (Walckenaer, 1841)

Synonyms
- Plectana hecata, Gasteracantha falcifera

= Gasteracantha hecata =

Species of arachnid

Gasteracantha hecata is a species of spider in the spiny orb-weaver genus Gasteracantha. It occurs in the Philippines and has prominent horn-like spines on its abdomen.

== Distribution ==
Gasteracantha hecata occurs in the Philippines. In 1914, Friedrich Dahl noted specimens from Manila, Luzon, and Samar in the Natural History Museum, Berlin collection.

== Description ==
Female G. hecata orb-weavers have hard, shiny yellow-and-black abdomens that are about twice as wide as long and armed with two pairs of spines. The anterior pair is tiny and sharply pointed, but the second pair is long, horn-like, and covered with short bristles. These spines curve gently backward, giving the animals a crescent-like shape. Notably, this species lacks a third pair of spines on the posterior edge of its abdomen (most Gasteracantha species have six spines).

The male of this species has not been scientifically described.

Charles Athanase Walckenaer described this species (in 1841, as Plectana hecata) based on drawings and notes found in James Petiver's early 18th-century Gazophylacium naturae et artis. Petiver himself had based his work on designs sent to him from Luzon by Czech Jesuit and naturalist Georg Joseph Kamel. In 1844, Carl Ludwig Koch described and illustrated a species he called Gasteracantha falcifera from a single specimen housed at the natural history museum in Berlin. By 1914, there were several specimens in Berlin, and Dahl determined that the descriptions from Petiver, Walckenaer, and Koch, as well as the specimens he examined himself, should all be treated as one species, Gasteracantha hecata.

== Gasteracantha parangdiadesmia ==
In a 1995 book, Riceland Spiders of South and Southeast Asia, A.T. Barrion and J.A. Litsinger described a spider from Luzon that they named Gasteracantha parangdiadesmia. Their description and illustration closely match 18th-, 19th-, and 20th-century descriptions and figures of G. hecata, but the authors do not reference G. hecata nor explain how their specimen differs from that species. G. parangdiadesmia is currently accepted as a valid species by the World Spider Catalog.
