= Metepeira minima =

Scientific classification
- Domain: Eukaryota
- Kingdom: Animalia
- Phylum: Arthropoda
- Subphylum: Chelicerata
- Class: Arachnida
- Order: Araneae
- Infraorder: Araneomorphae
- Family: Araneidae
- Genus: Metepeira
- Species: M. minima

Binomial name
- Metepeira minima Gertsch, 1936

Species of spider

Metepeira minima is a species of orb weaver in the spider family Araneidae. It is found in a range from the United States to Honduras.
