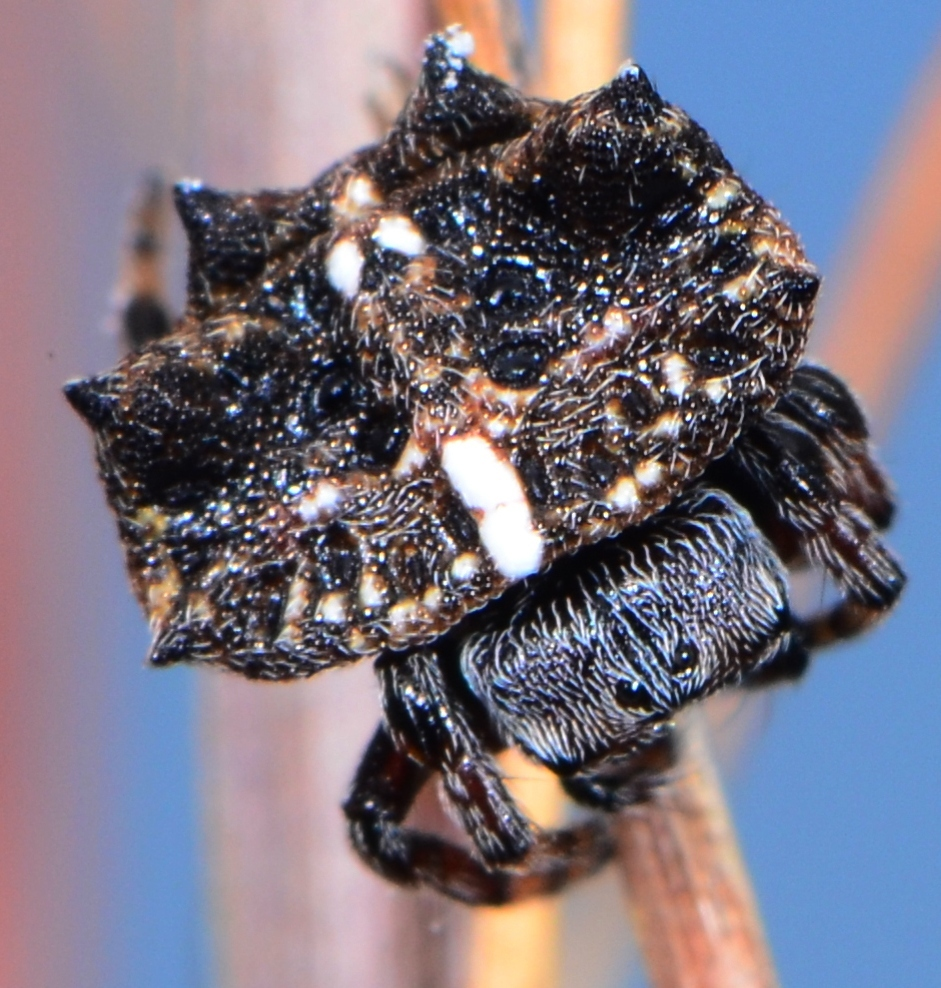
- female
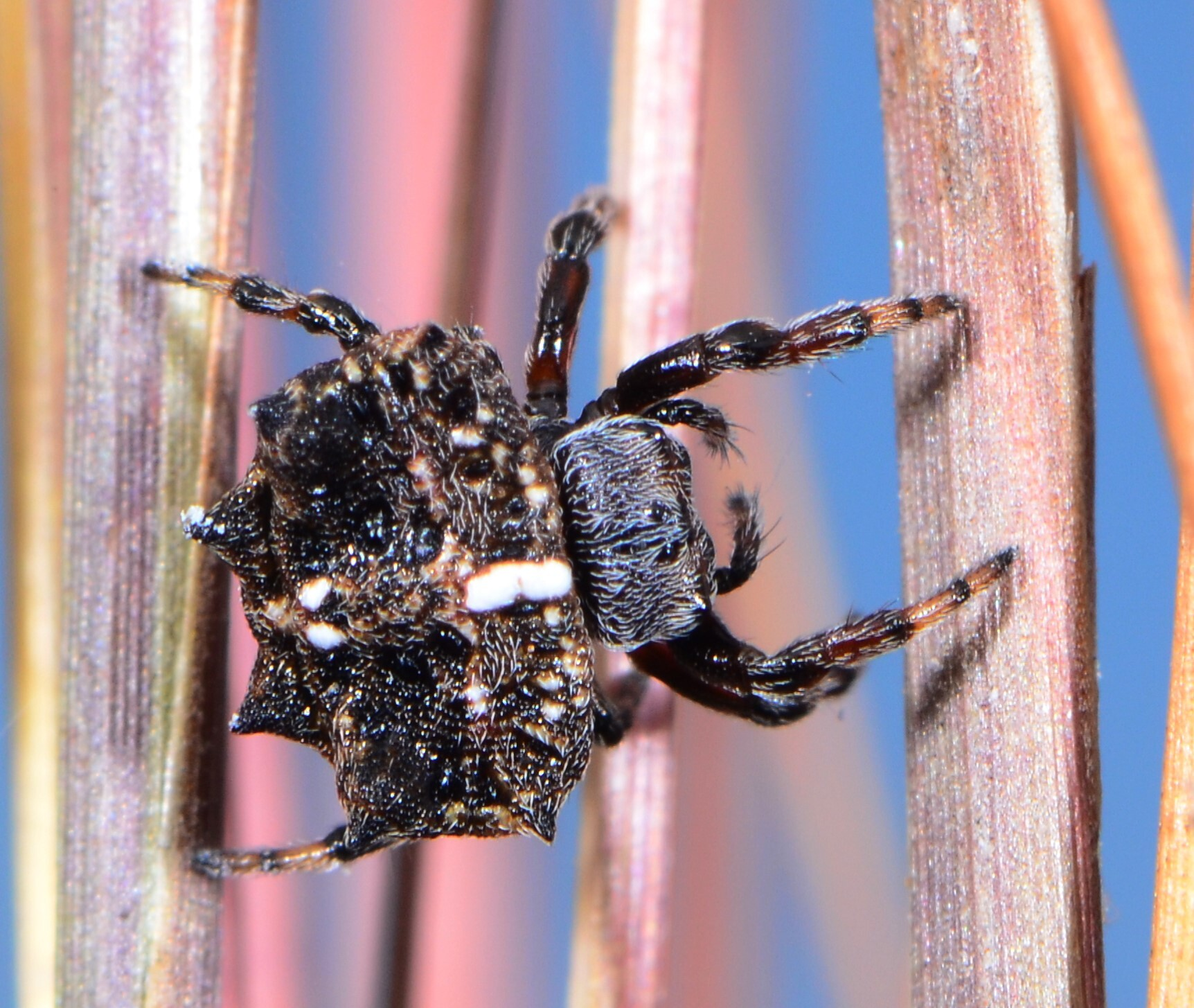
- female

Scientific classification
- Kingdom: Animalia
- Phylum: Arthropoda
- Subphylum: Chelicerata
- Class: Arachnida
- Order: Araneae
- Infraorder: Araneomorphae
- Family: Araneidae
- Genus: Hypsacantha; Dahl, 1914
- Species: H. crucimaculata

Binomial name
- Hypsacantha crucimaculata (Dahl, 1914)

Synonyms
- Gasteracantha crucimaculata Dahl, 1914; Isoxya crucimaculata Benoit, 1962

= Hypsacantha =

Hypsacantha Kite Spider

Species of spider

Hypsacantha is a genus of African orb-weaver spiders containing the single species, Hypsacantha crucimaculata. It was first described by Friedrich Dahl in 1914, and is found from Central to Southern Africa.

== Distribution ==
Hypsacantha crucimaculata is known from Central African Republic, Democratic Republic of the Congo, Mozambique, Tanzania, Zimbabwe and South Africa. The species is possibly undercollected and is suspected to occur in more countries in between.

The South African distribution includes Eastern Cape, KwaZulu-Natal, Limpopo, Mpumalanga, North West, and Western Cape provinces. Notable localities include Mountain Zebra National Park, Mkuze Game Reserve, Ndumo Game Reserve, Tembe Elephant Park, Lekgalameetse Nature Reserve, Kruger National Park, Pilanesberg Nature Reserve, Karoo National Park, and Bontebok National Park.

== Habitat and ecology ==
The species constructs an orb-web but nothing more is known about their behaviour. In South Africa, it has been sampled from the Nama Karoo and Savanna biomes at altitudes from 54 to 1,513 m above sea level.

== Description ==
Total length ranges from 6-7 mm in females and 3-5 mm in males.

The carapace is broad and dark brown, clothed with strong white setae, while the median eyes are positioned on small tubercles and the lateral eyes are located near the border of the carapace.

The abdomen is hard and leathery with an anterior edge that is slightly rounded and bears two small tubercles, and six sigilla are present at the base of spine II. The abdomen slopes slightly toward the rear and features two pairs of small tubercles, with the medial pair pointing upwards. The legs are short and the same color as the carapace.

== Conservation ==
Hypsacantha crucimaculata is listed as Least Concern by the South African National Biodiversity Institute due to its wide geographical range. There are no known threats to the species. The species has been sampled from several protected areas including Ophathe Game Reserve, Makalali Nature Reserve, Karoo National Park and Kruger National Park.

== Taxonomy ==
Originally described as subgenus of Gasteracantha Sundevall, 1833, it was elevated to genus by Emerit, 1973. It is known from both sexes.
