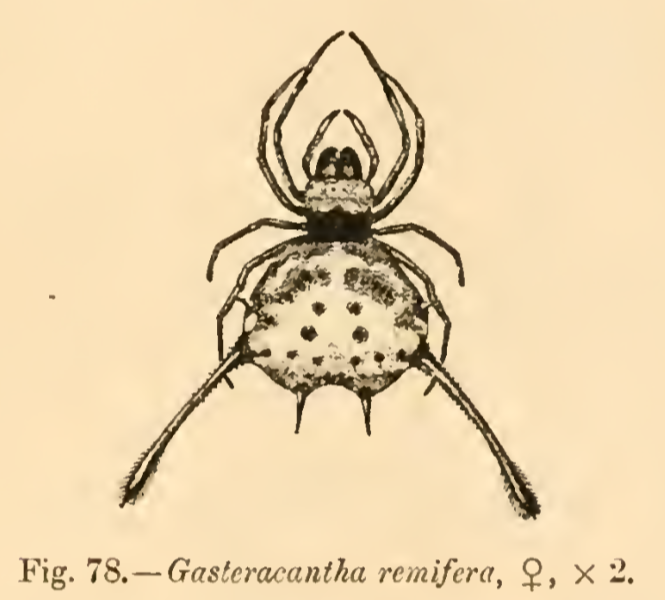

Scientific classification
- Kingdom: Animalia
- Phylum: Arthropoda
- Subphylum: Chelicerata
- Class: Arachnida
- Order: Araneae
- Infraorder: Araneomorphae
- Family: Araneidae
- Genus: Gasteracantha
- Species: G. remifera

Binomial name
- Gasteracantha remifera Butler, 1873

= Gasteracantha remifera =

Species of spider

Gasteracantha remifera is a species of spiny orb-weaver spider in the genus Gasteracantha. It is found in Sri Lanka and India, and it has a pair of long, club-shaped spines on its abdomen.

== Description ==
Female G. remifera have hard, yellow, shell-like abdomens marked with 20 black sigilla and armed with three pairs of spines. The middle pair of spines is up to twice as long (to 15 millimeters) as the abdomen is wide (about 7 millimeters). These long spines become narrower toward the middle but swell toward the end, giving them a club-shaped appearance. The shafts of these long median spines bear whitish hairs. The front (anterior) and rear (posterior) pairs of spines are small and sharp, with the rear pair longer than the front pair.

Photograph of female G. remifera from Sri Lanka.

The male of this species has not been scientifically described.

== Distribution ==
19th- and early 20th-century authors described several specimens from Sri Lanka. In 1914, Dahl described 13 specimens, all from Sri Lanka. The species is also documented from Andaman and Nicobar Islands. In 1982, B.K. Tikader included "India: Tamil Nadu; Borively National Park, Maharashtra" in his species distribution notes for G. remifera.

== Similar Species ==
In India, G. dalyi also has long median spines, but these taper gradually to a point, lacking the club-like ends possessed by G. remifera. G. clavatrix of Sulawesi was confused with this species by Karsch in 1892, but G. clavatrix has median spines shorter than the width of the abdomen and clad with dark hairs. Macracantha arcuata has much longer, thinner, and more curved median spines without club-shaped ends or whitish hairs.
