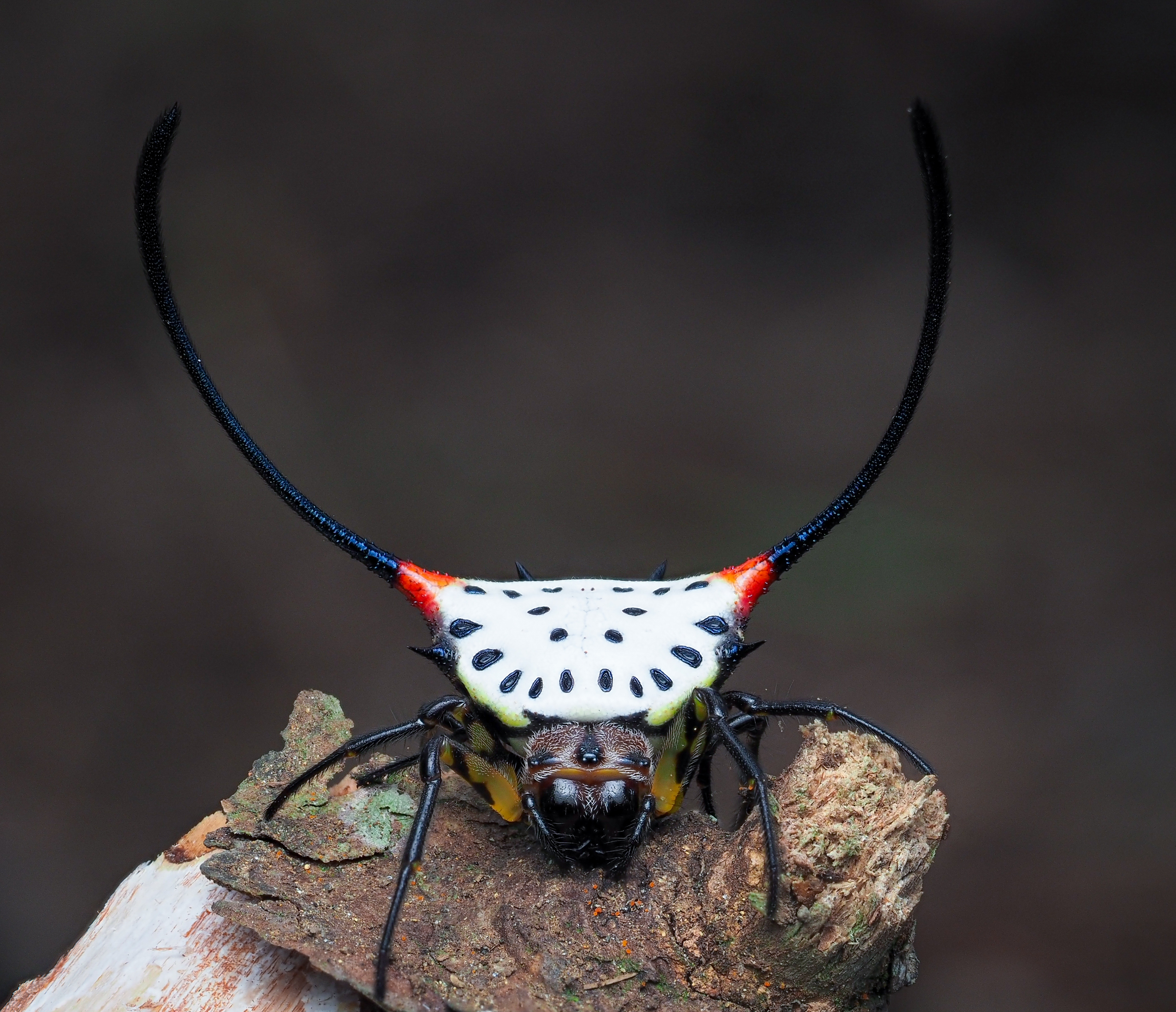
- G. sanguinea
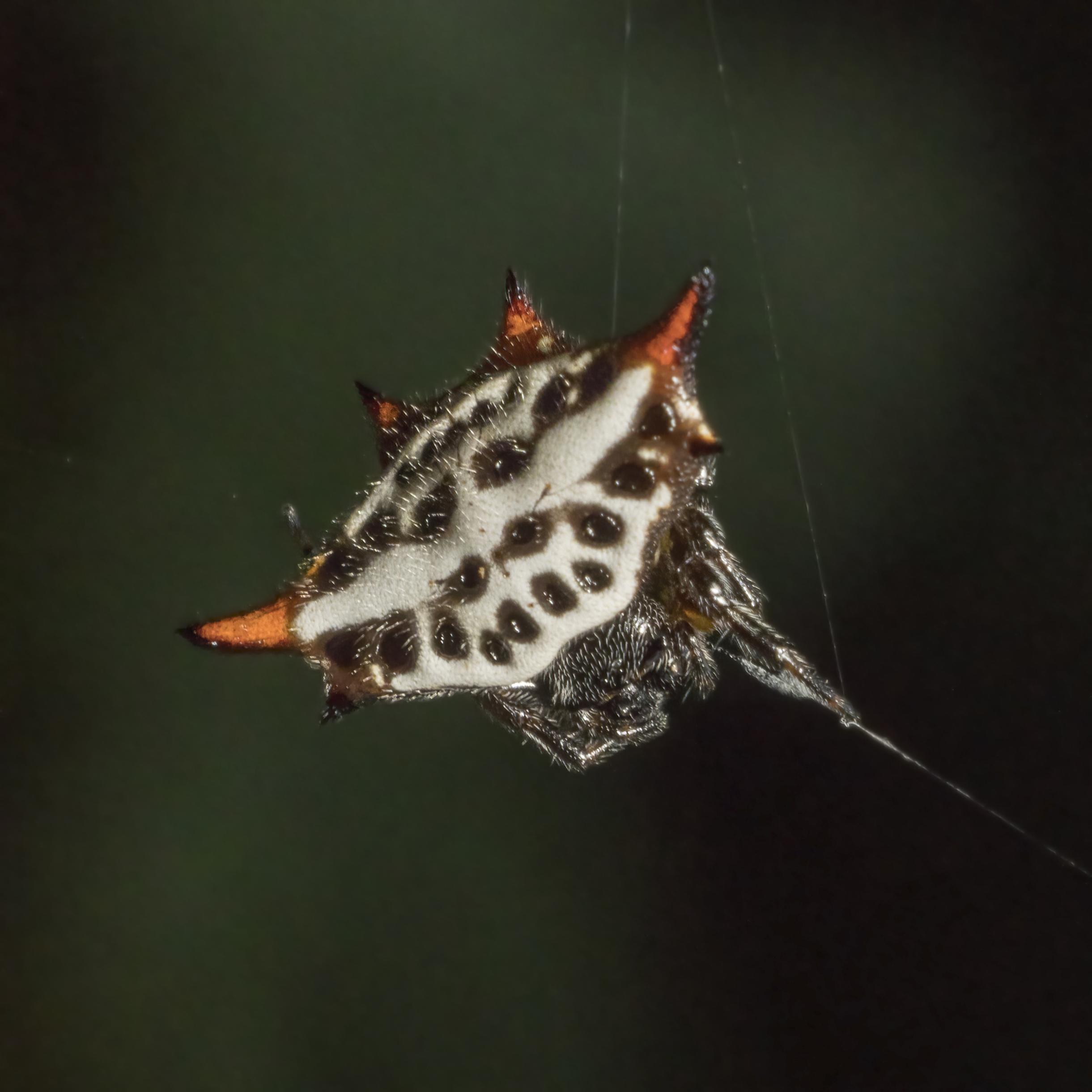
- G. sanguinolenta dorsal side

Scientific classification
- Kingdom: Animalia
- Phylum: Arthropoda
- Subphylum: Chelicerata
- Class: Arachnida
- Order: Araneae
- Infraorder: Araneomorphae
- Family: Araneidae
- Genus: Gasteracantha; Sundevall, 1833

Type species
- G. cancriformis (Linnaeus, 1758)

Species
- 85, see text

= Gasteracantha =

Genus of spiders

Gasteracantha is a genus of orb-weaver spiders first named by Carl Jakob Sundevall in 1833. Species of the genus are known as spiny-backed orb-weavers, spiny orb-weavers, or spiny spiders. The females of most species are brightly colored with six prominent spines on their broad, hardened, shell-like abdomens.

== Names ==
The genus name Gasteracantha derives from Ancient Greek γαστήρ (gastḗr), meaning "belly", and ἄκανθα (ákantha), meaning "thorn".

Spiny-backed orb-weavers are sometimes colloquially called "crab spiders" because of their shape, but they are not closely related to the true crab spiders. Other colloquial names for certain species include thorn spider, star spider, kite spider, or jewel spider.

Other genera in the same family are also known as spiny orb-weavers.

== Distribution ==
Gasteracantha species are distributed worldwide in tropical and subtropical climates. The genus is most diverse in tropical Asia, from India through Indonesia. One species, G. cancriformis, occurs in the Americas.

== Sexual dimorphism ==
Members of the genus exhibit strong sexual dimorphism. Females are several times larger than males, which lack prominent spines or bright colors.

== Predators and defense mechanisms ==
Some species of orb-weavers use stridulation. A 2020 study found that, while it resembled antipredator stridulation in other arthropods, there was no evidence that this was a defense mechanism. Orb-weavers' bites are generally harmless to humans.

== Taxonomy and systematics ==
Gasteracantha has a complex taxonomic history, and many questions of species limits and distribution and generic interrelationships remain unanswered. Furthermore, challenges include the variability within individual Gasteracantha species (e.g., color polymorphism and variable length and shape of spines), a lack of male specimens and descriptions for many species, missing or damaged type specimens, and ambiguous initial descriptions in 18th- and 19th-century scientific literature. The around 70 species currently recognized by World Spider Catalog include dozens of synonyms and subspecies, many based on literature well over 100 years old.

A 2019 study examining three mitochondrial and two nuclear genes found that Gasteracantha is paraphyletic with respect to Macracantha, Actinacantha, and Thelacantha. M. arcuata is allied with G. hasselti and A. globulata, while T. brevispina is closer to G. kuhli and G. diardi. The authors, however, did not propose generic reassignments based on their findings.

Micrathena orb-weavers in North and South America also have hardened abdomens with variously shaped spines, but they are not closely related to Gasteracantha within the orb-weaver family.

=== Species ===
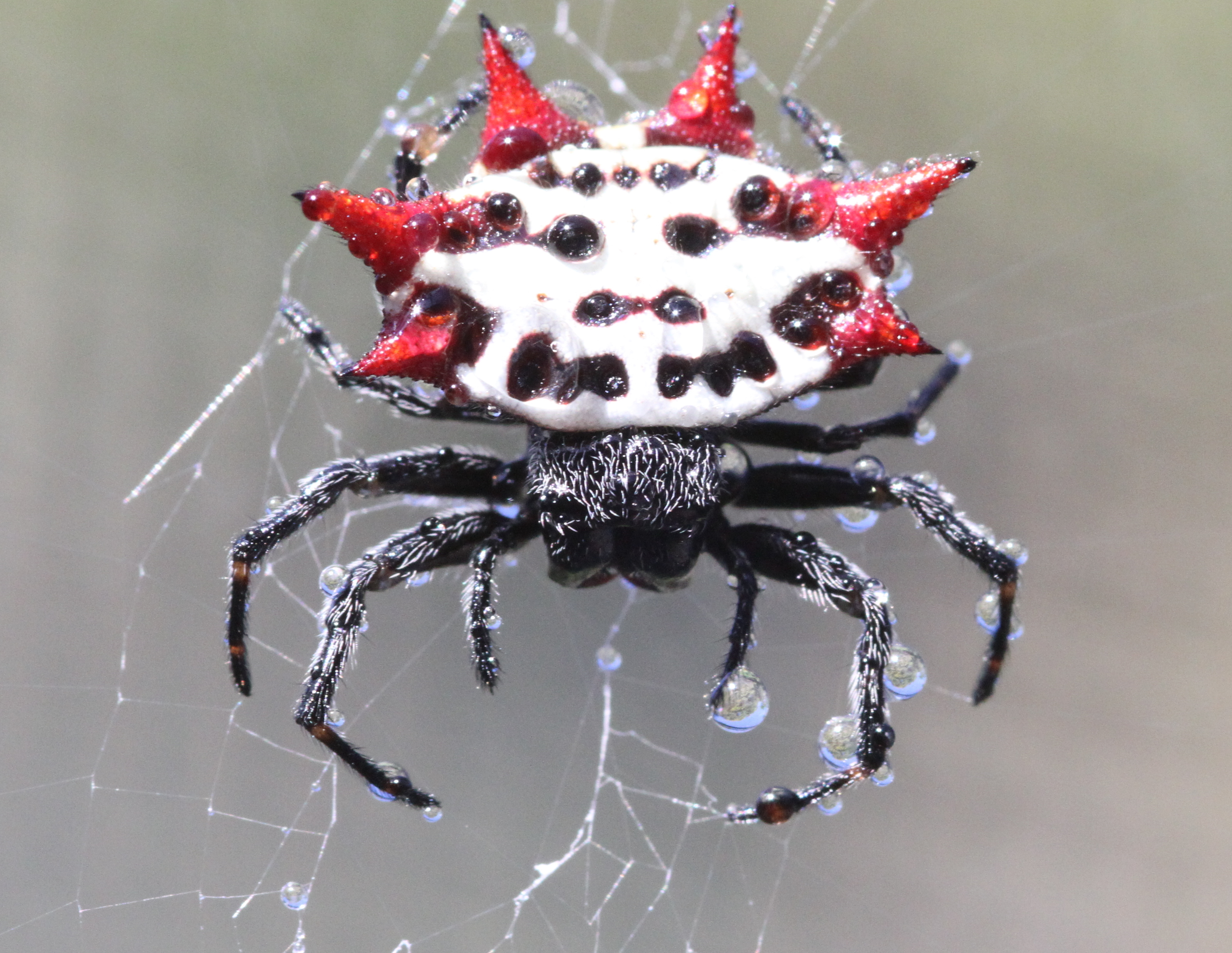
G. cancriformis

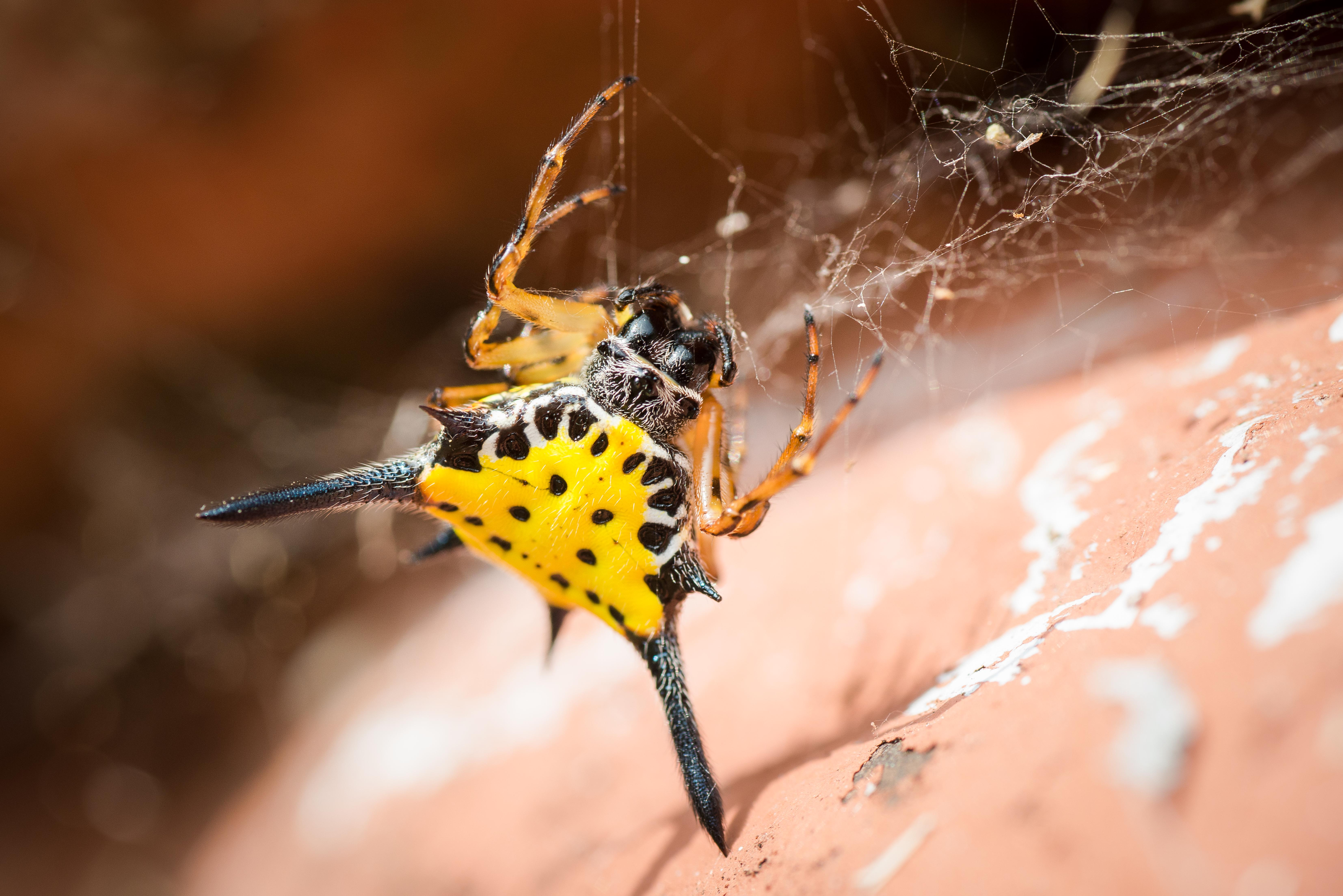
G. hasselti
Thailand

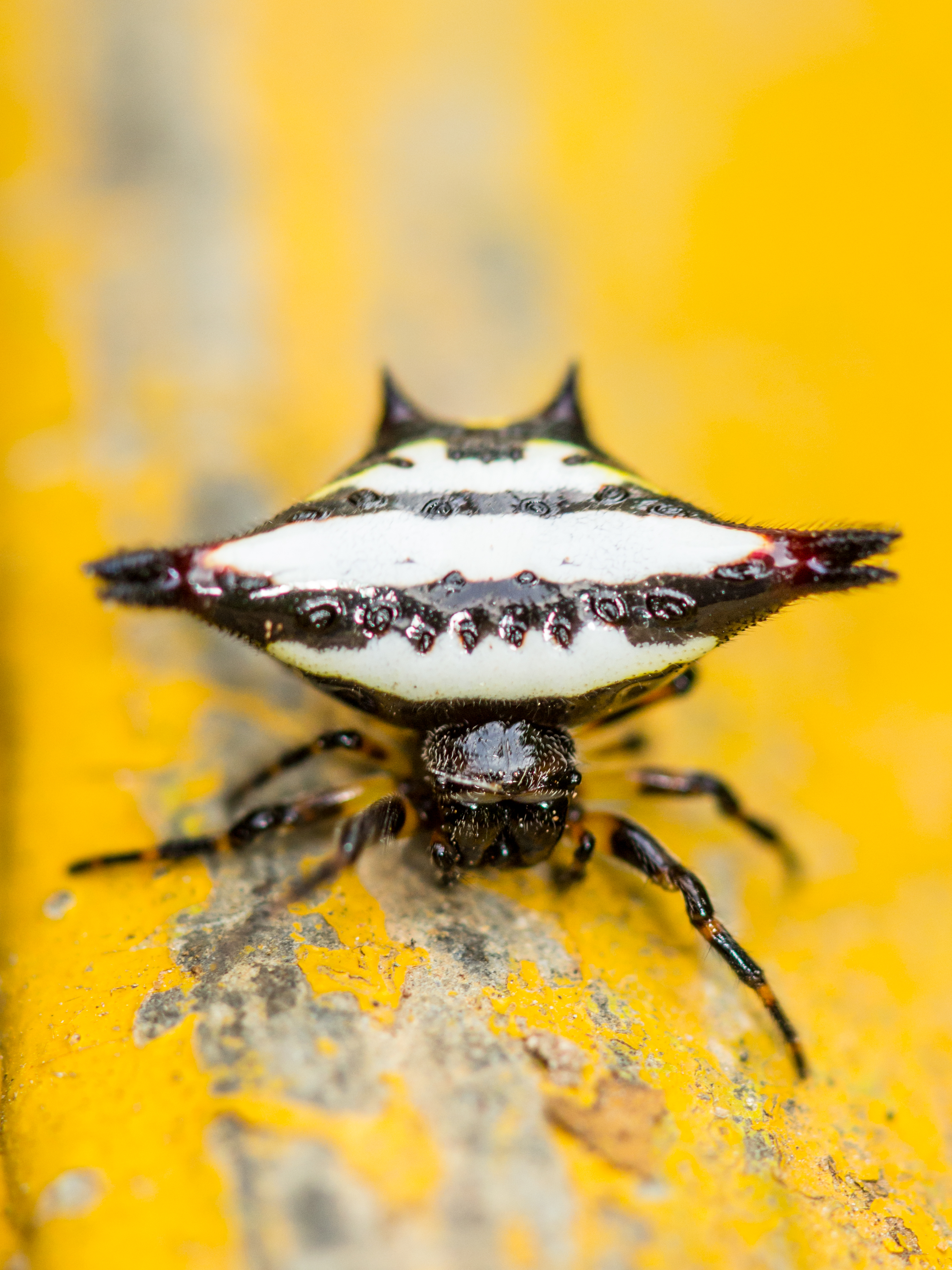
G. geminata
Bangalore, India

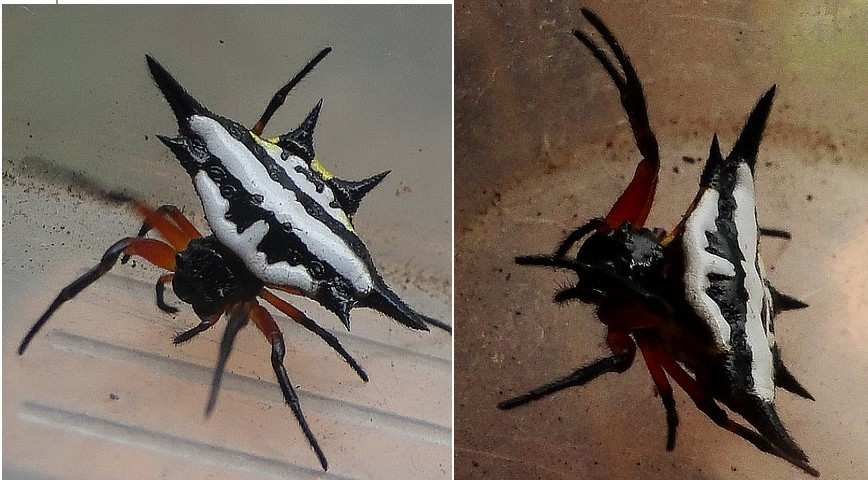
G. rhomboidea madagascariensis
Mahanoro, Madagascar

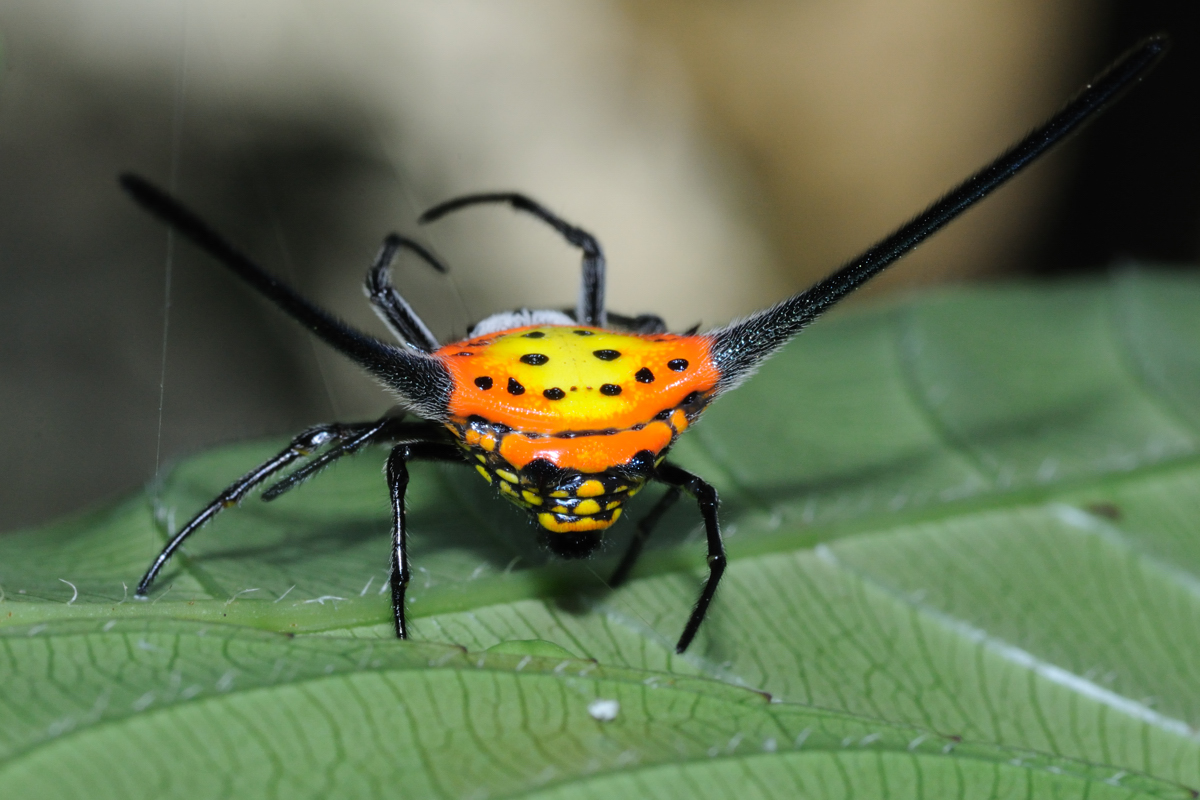
G. dalyi
Karnataka, India

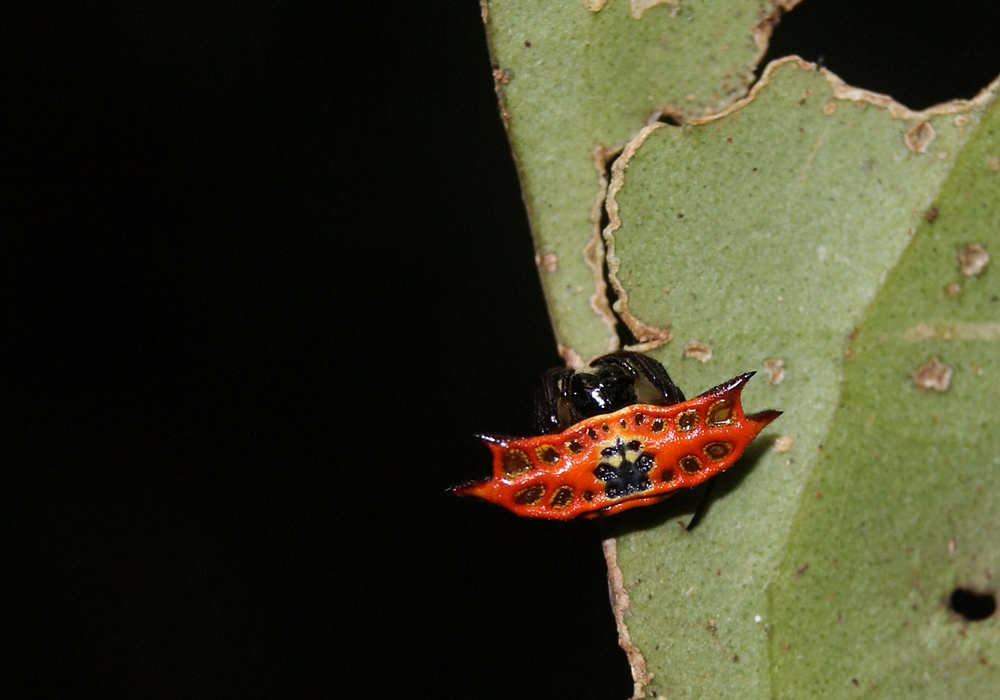
G. quadrispinosa
Queensland, Australia

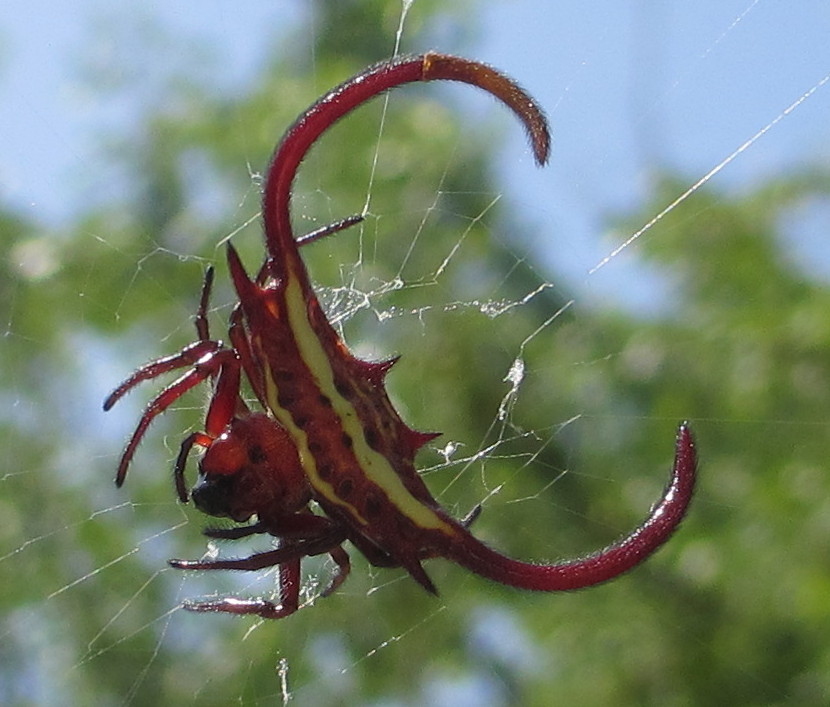
G. falcicornis
Mozambique

As of November 2026, this genus includes 67 species and eighteen subspecies:

- Gasteracantha aciculata (Pocock, 1898) – Papua New Guinea (New Britain)
- Gasteracantha acutispina Dahl, 1914 – Indonesia (Sulawesi)
- Gasteracantha audouini Guérin, 1838 – Indonesia (Sumatra, Timor, Ambon), Philippines
- Gasteracantha aureola Mi & Peng, 2013 – China
- Gasteracantha beccarii Thorell, 1877 – Indonesia (Sulawesi)
- Gasteracantha biloba (Thorell, 1878) – Indonesia (Moluccas, Ambon)
- Gasteracantha cancriformis (Linnaeus, 1758) – North America, Central America, Caribbean, South America. Introduced to Hawaii (type species)
  - G. c. gertschi Archer, 1941 – United States
- Gasteracantha clarki Emerit, 1974 – Seychelles
- Gasteracantha clavatrix (Walckenaer, 1841) – Indonesia (Lombok, Sulawesi, Mentawai Is.)
- Gasteracantha clavigera Giebel, 1863 – Thailand, Philippines, Indonesia (Sulawesi)
- Gasteracantha crucigera Bradley, 1877 – Malaysia, Indonesia (Borneo, Java, New Guinea)
- Gasteracantha curvispina (Guérin, 1837) – West, Central Africa
- Gasteracantha curvistyla Dahl, 1914 – Indonesia (Togian Is.)
- Gasteracantha dalyi Pocock, 1900 – Pakistan, India
- Gasteracantha diadesmia Thorell, 1887 – Pakistan, India, China, Taiwan, Myanmar, Vietnam, Malaysia, Singapore, Indonesia, Philippines
- Gasteracantha diardi (Lucas, 1835) – India, China, Laos, Thailand, Malaysia, Indonesia
- Gasteracantha doriae Simon, 1877 – Thailand, Malaysia, Singapore, Indonesia (Sumatra, Borneo)
- Gasteracantha falcicornis Butler, 1873 – Tanzania, Zambia, Malawi, Mozambique, South Africa, Eswatini
- Gasteracantha fasciata Guérin, 1838 – Indonesia (New Guinea), Guam
- Gasteracantha flava Nicolet, 1849 – Chile
- Gasteracantha fornicata (Fabricius, 1775) – Australia (Queensland)
- Gasteracantha frontata Blackwall, 1864 – India, Myanmar, Thailand, Vietnam, Malaysia (Borneo), Indonesia (Borneo, Flores)
- Gasteracantha gambeyi Simon, 1877 – New Caledonia
- Gasteracantha geminata (Fabricius, 1798) – India, Sri Lanka
- Gasteracantha hecata (Walckenaer, 1841) – Philippines
- Gasteracantha interrupta Dahl, 1914 – Indonesia (Lombok, Sulawesi)
- Gasteracantha irradiata (Walckenaer, 1841) – Thailand, Vietnam, Philippines, Indonesia
- Gasteracantha janopol Barrion & Litsinger, 1995 – Philippines
- Gasteracantha kuhli C. L. Koch, 1837 – India, Japan, Philippines, Indonesia
- Gasteracantha lepelletieri (Guérin, 1825) – Indonesia (Sumatra to New Guinea), Philippines
- Gasteracantha lunata Guérin, 1838 – Timor, Indonesia (Moluccas), New Caledonia
- Gasteracantha martensi Dahl, 1914 – Indonesia (Sumatra)
- Gasteracantha mediofusca (Doleschall, 1859) – Indonesia (Java), New Guinea
- Gasteracantha mengei Keyserling, 1864 – Malaysia, Indonesia (Sumatra, Borneo)
- Gasteracantha milvoides Butler, 1873 – Central African Rep. Kenya, Tanzania, Malawi, Namibia, Zimbabwe, South Africa, Eswatini
- Gasteracantha notata Kulczyński, 1910 – Papua New Guinea (New Britain)
- Gasteracantha panisicca Butler, 1873 – Myanmar, Philippines, Indonesia (Java)
- Gasteracantha parangdiadesmia Barrion & Litsinger, 1995 – Philippines
- Gasteracantha pentagona (Walckenaer, 1841) – Papua New Guinea (New Ireland, New Britain, Bismarck Arch.)
- Gasteracantha picta (Thorell, 1893) – Singapore
- Gasteracantha quadrispinosa O. Pickard-Cambridge, 1879 – Papua New Guinea, Australia (Queensland)
- Gasteracantha recurva Simon, 1877 – Philippines
- Gasteracantha regalis Butler, 1873 – Vanuatu
- Gasteracantha remifera Butler, 1873 – India, Sri Lanka
- Gasteracantha rhomboidea Guérin, 1838 – Mauritius
  - G. r. comorensis Strand, 1916 – Comoros, Mayotte
  - G. r. madagascariensis Vinson, 1863 – Madagascar
- Gasteracantha rubrospinis Guérin, 1838 – Thailand, Indonesia (Lombok, Sulawesi, Moluccas), New Caledonia, Guam
- Gasteracantha rufithorax Simon, 1881 – Madagascar
- Gasteracantha sacerdotalis L. Koch, 1872 – Indonesia (New Guinea), Australia (Queensland), New Caledonia
- Gasteracantha sanguinea Dahl, 1914 – Philippines
- Gasteracantha sanguinolenta C. L. Koch, 1844 – Africa, St. Helena, Seychelles, Yemen (mainland, Socotra)
  - G. s. andrefanae Emerit, 1974 – Madagascar
  - G. s. bigoti Emerit, 1974 – Madagascar
  - G. s. emeriti Roberts, 1983 – Seychelles (Aldabra)
  - G. s. insulicola Emerit, 1974 – Seychelles
  - G. s. legendrei Emerit, 1974 – Europa Island
  - G. s. mangrovae Emerit, 1974 – Madagascar
- Gasteracantha sapperi Dahl, 1914 – New Guinea
- Gasteracantha sauteri Dahl, 1914 – China, Taiwan, Vietnam
- Gasteracantha scintillans Butler, 1873 – Solomon Is.
- Gasteracantha signifera Pocock, 1898 – Solomon Is.
  - G. s. bistrigella Strand, 1911 – Papua New Guinea (Bismarck Arch.)
  - G. s. heterospina Strand, 1915 – Papua New Guinea (Bismarck Arch.)
  - G. s. pustulinota Strand, 1911 – Papua New Guinea (Bismarck Arch.)
- Gasteracantha simoni O. Pickard-Cambridge, 1879 – Central Africa
- Gasteracantha sororna Butler, 1873 – India
- Gasteracantha sturi (Doleschall, 1857) – Laos, Indonesia (Sumatra, Borneo, Java, Moluccas)
- Gasteracantha subaequispina Dahl, 1914 – Papua New Guinea
- Gasteracantha taeniata (Walckenaer, 1841) – India, Polynesia
  - G. t. analispina Strand, 1911 – New Guinea
  - G. t. anirensis Strand, 1911 – Papua New Guinea (New Ireland)
  - G. t. lugubris Simon, 1898 – Solomon Is.
  - G. t. novahannoveriana Dahl, 1914 – Papua New Guinea (Bismarck Arch.)
- Gasteracantha theisi Guérin, 1838 – Indonesia, Papua New Guinea, Solomon Is.
- Gasteracantha thomasinsulae Archer, 1951 – São Tomé and Príncipe
- Gasteracantha thorelli Keyserling, 1864 – Madagascar
- Gasteracantha tondanae Pocock, 1897 – Indonesia (Sulawesi)
- Gasteracantha transversa C. L. Koch, 1837 – Indonesia (Sumatra, Java)
- Gasteracantha unguifera Simon, 1889 – India, China
- Gasteracantha versicolor (Walckenaer, 1841) – Central, East, Southern Africa
  - G. v. avaratrae Emerit, 1974 – Madagascar
  - G. v. formosa Vinson, 1863 – Madagascar
- Gasteracantha westringi Keyserling, 1864 – Papua New Guinea, New Caledonia, Australia
