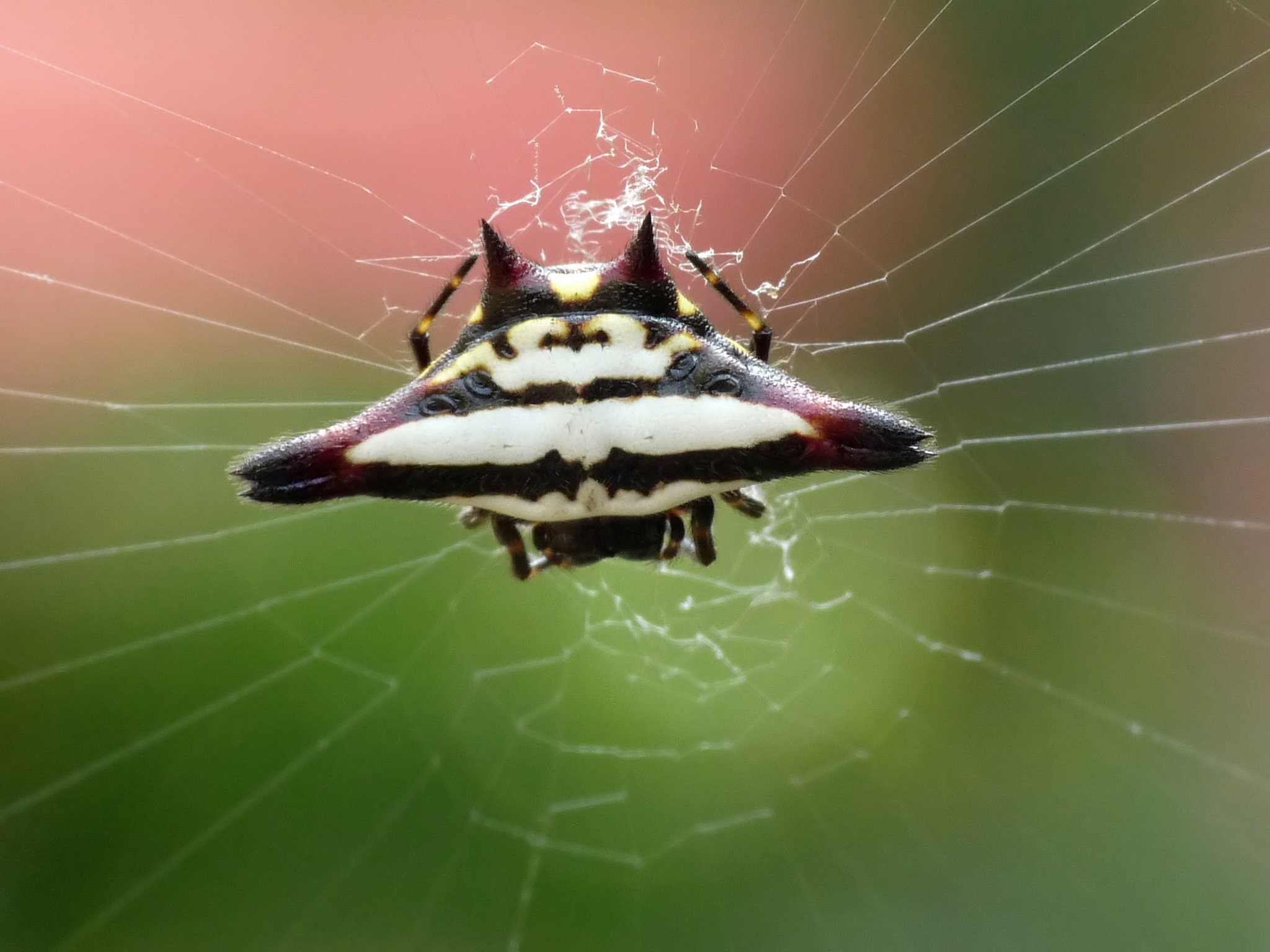

Scientific classification
- Kingdom: Animalia
- Phylum: Arthropoda
- Subphylum: Chelicerata
- Class: Arachnida
- Order: Araneae
- Infraorder: Araneomorphae
- Family: Araneidae
- Genus: Gasteracantha
- Species: G. geminata

Binomial name
- Gasteracantha geminata (Fabricius, 1798)

= Gasteracantha geminata =

Oriental spiny orb-weaver

Species of spider

Gasteracantha geminata is a species of spider of the genus Gasteracantha, found in India and Sri Lanka. It is known as the oriental spiny orb-weaver.

== Description ==
Rather than sexual dimorphism, both male and female have black and white transverse bands on the abdomen. The abdomen has three pairs of long stout lateral spines. The female of the species is characterized by having a highly sclerotized "spiny" abdomen, which is a common feature of the genus. Females also have varying numbers of sigillae in both dorsal and ventral abdominal surfaces. Males are somewhat smaller than females and with lesser coloration and abdominal spines.

== Web ==
The oriental spiny orb-weaver constructs vertical orb webs, normally within open spaces between the branches of tall shrubs and thorns.
