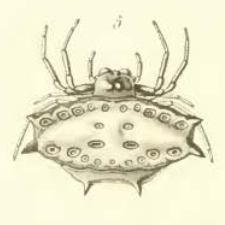

Scientific classification
- Kingdom: Animalia
- Phylum: Arthropoda
- Subphylum: Chelicerata
- Class: Arachnida
- Order: Araneae
- Infraorder: Araneomorphae
- Family: Araneidae
- Genus: Gasteracantha
- Species: G. gambeyi

Binomial name
- Gasteracantha gambeyi Simon, 1877

= Gasteracantha gambeyi =

Species of spider

Gasteracantha gambeyi is a species of spiny orb-weaver spider in the genus Gasteracantha. It was described from New Caledonia.

== Description ==
Gasteracantha gambeyi is known from a single 19th century description of a female specimen. French naturalist Eugène Simon described a specimen with an abdomen measuring 15.5 millimeters wide by 8.5 millimeters long, with three pairs of short (2 millimeters), black, and widely spaced spines around the abdomen. These spines were covered with small tubercles. Simon described the upper surface of the abdomen as a bright, clear red-brown color with black sigilla and transverse black bands, the anterior band broken in the middle.

In 1914, Friedrich Dahl synonymized G. gambeyi with Gasteracantha rubrospinis, musing, however, that G. gambeyi might be a species between G. rubrospinis and Gasteracantha fasciata. The World Spider Catalog does not follow Dahl in this case and retains G. gambeyi as a distinct species in the catalog.
