= Kite spider =

Kite spider refers to one of the following genera:

- Gasteracantha, the spiny orb-weavers or kite spiders
- Isoxya, the box kite spiders
