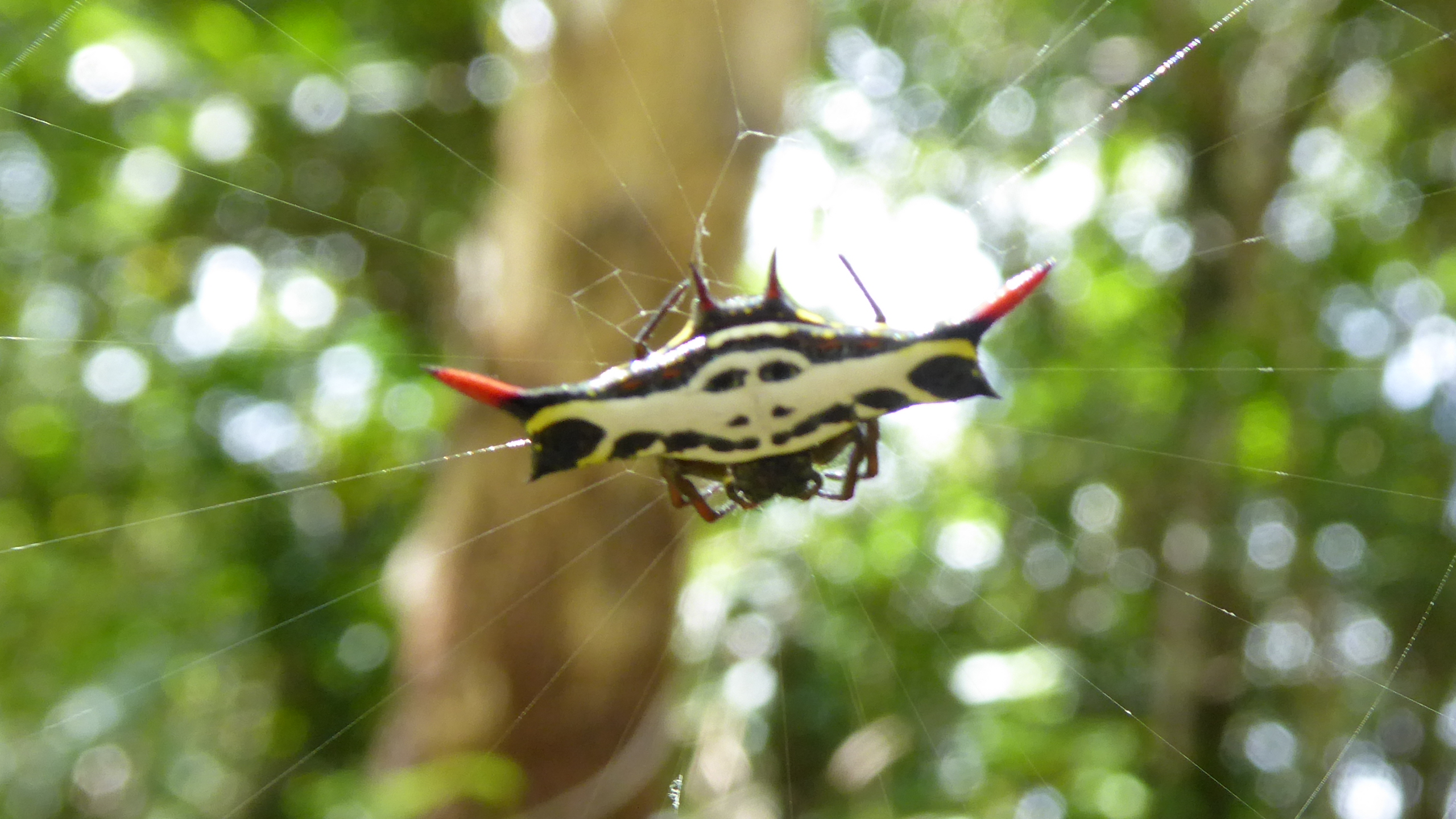
- G. westringi in New Caledonia
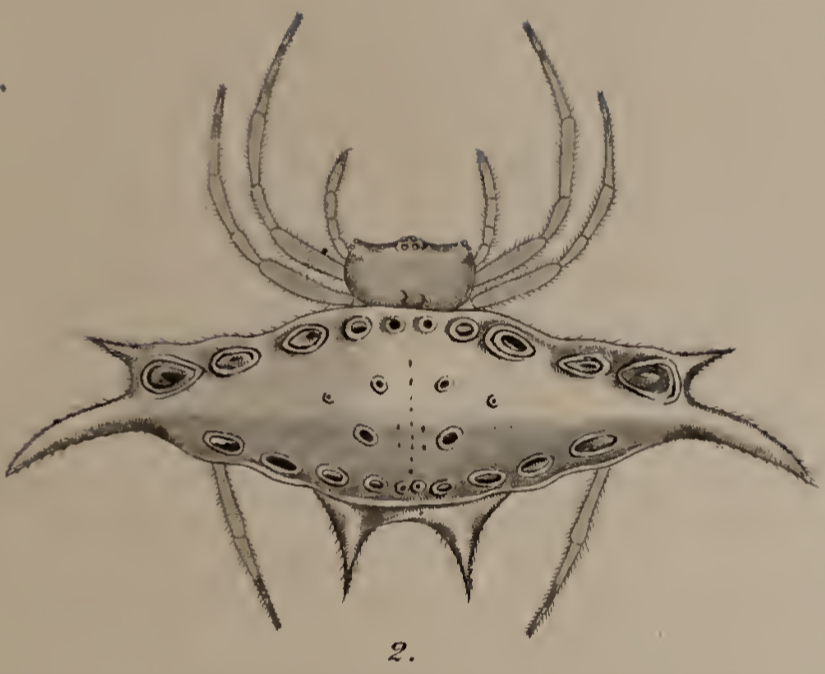
- Scientific illustration (Koch 1871)

Scientific classification
- Kingdom: Animalia
- Phylum: Arthropoda
- Subphylum: Chelicerata
- Class: Arachnida
- Order: Araneae
- Infraorder: Araneomorphae
- Family: Araneidae
- Genus: Gasteracantha
- Species: G. westringi

Binomial name
- Gasteracantha westringi Keyserling, 1864

= Gasteracantha westringi =

Species of spider

Gasteracantha westringi is a species of spiny orb-weaver spider in the genus Gasteracantha. It is found in Australasia, including New Caledonia and Norfolk Island, and it has a wing-shaped abdomen armed with red and black spines.

== Description ==
Female G. westringi have hard, shell-like abdomens that are about three times as wide (about 13 millimeters, without spines) as long (4 millimeters) and are flared upward at each end like a pair of wings. Their abdomens bear three pairs of spines. The front (anterior) pair are short, about 1 millimeter long, black, and point slightly forward. The middle (median) pair are black at the base and red for much of their length, with black tips. These median spines are about 4.5 millimeters long and curve back and slightly downward. The rear pair of spines are about 2 millimeters long.

Female abdomens are marked with depressed black sigilla. Above, the front edge of the abdomen bears 10 sigilla in a curved row, the middle four relatively small and the outermost large and egg-shaped; the larger outer sigilla are also visible on the underside of the abdomen. Four sigilla form a trapezoid in the center of the upper abdomen, and another row traces the posterior edge. The sigilla may be surrounded by a pale yellow colour.

The male of this species has not been scientifically described.

== Taxonomy and distribution ==
The first scientific description of this species by Keyserling in 1864 did not include a place of origin for the species.

In 1865 and 1871, similar descriptions were published based on specimens from New Caledonia (as G. laeta) and Australia. In 1871, Koch also described a species from New Caledonia that he called G. mollusca, noting that it the specimen may have been a freshly molted individual. In 1889, A.T. Urquhart published a description of an orb-weaver from Norfolk Island, which he named G. ocillatum, noting its close similarity to G. westringi but not explaining why it warranted species status.

In 1914, Friedrich Dahl provisionally united all these descriptions under G. westringi, noting that further research across the region was needed to clarify the status of different forms.

In 1911, Embrik Strand briefly named a species, G. wogeonis, from Vokeo in the Schouten Islands (Papua New Guinea), writing that it was separable from G. westringi by shorter spines and smaller sigilla. Apparently based on this comment, Dahl also provisionally synonymized G. wogeonis with G. westringi, without specific comment. However, in 1915, Strand published a more detailed description and an illustration of G. wogeonis that depicted a small-spined, reddish-coloured, less elongate form quite unlike any other description of taxa included by Dahl in G. westringi.

== Popular culture ==
Gasteracantha westringi was featured on a 2004 Norfolk Island postage stamp series. The stamp series stated that the species is locally known as the red-horned spider and is commonly found on Norfolk and nearby Phillip Island.
