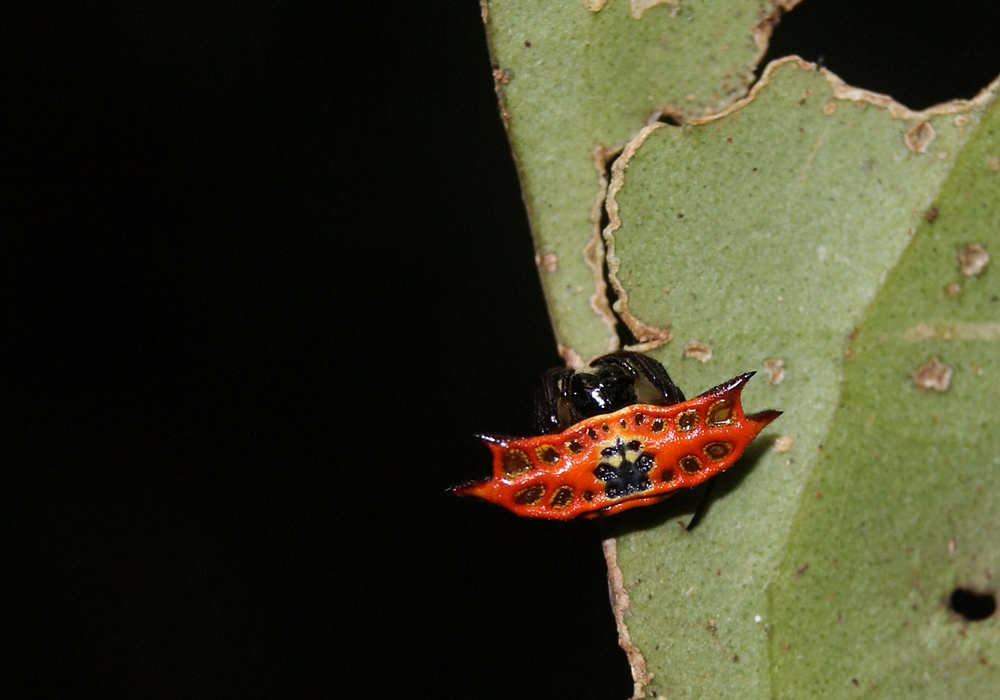

Scientific classification
- Kingdom: Animalia
- Phylum: Arthropoda
- Subphylum: Chelicerata
- Class: Arachnida
- Order: Araneae
- Infraorder: Araneomorphae
- Family: Araneidae
- Genus: Gasteracantha
- Species: G. quadrispinosa

Binomial name
- Gasteracantha quadrispinosa O. Pickard Cambridge, 1879

= Gasteracantha quadrispinosa =

Species of arachnid

Gasteracantha quadrispinosa, the four-spined jewel spider, is a brightly coloured species of spider in the spiny orb-weaver genus Gasteracantha. It occurs in wet forests of Queensland, Australia, and New Guinea, where it builds vertical orb webs approximately 1.5 m across and hangs in the centre of the web to wait for prey.

== Description ==
Female four-spined jewel spiders are distinctively shaped and coloured. Their abdomens are flat, oblong, and curved slightly forward, 5-6 mm wide, excluding spines. The corners of the abdomen are armed with short spines, the rear pair slightly longer than the pair in front. Unlike most members of its genus, G. quadrispinosa lacks a third pair of spines on the hind margin of its abdomen, so it is four spined or quadrispinose. The hard, shiny upper surface of the abdomen ranges from red to yellow in colour and is marked with a black spot and dark sigilla.
