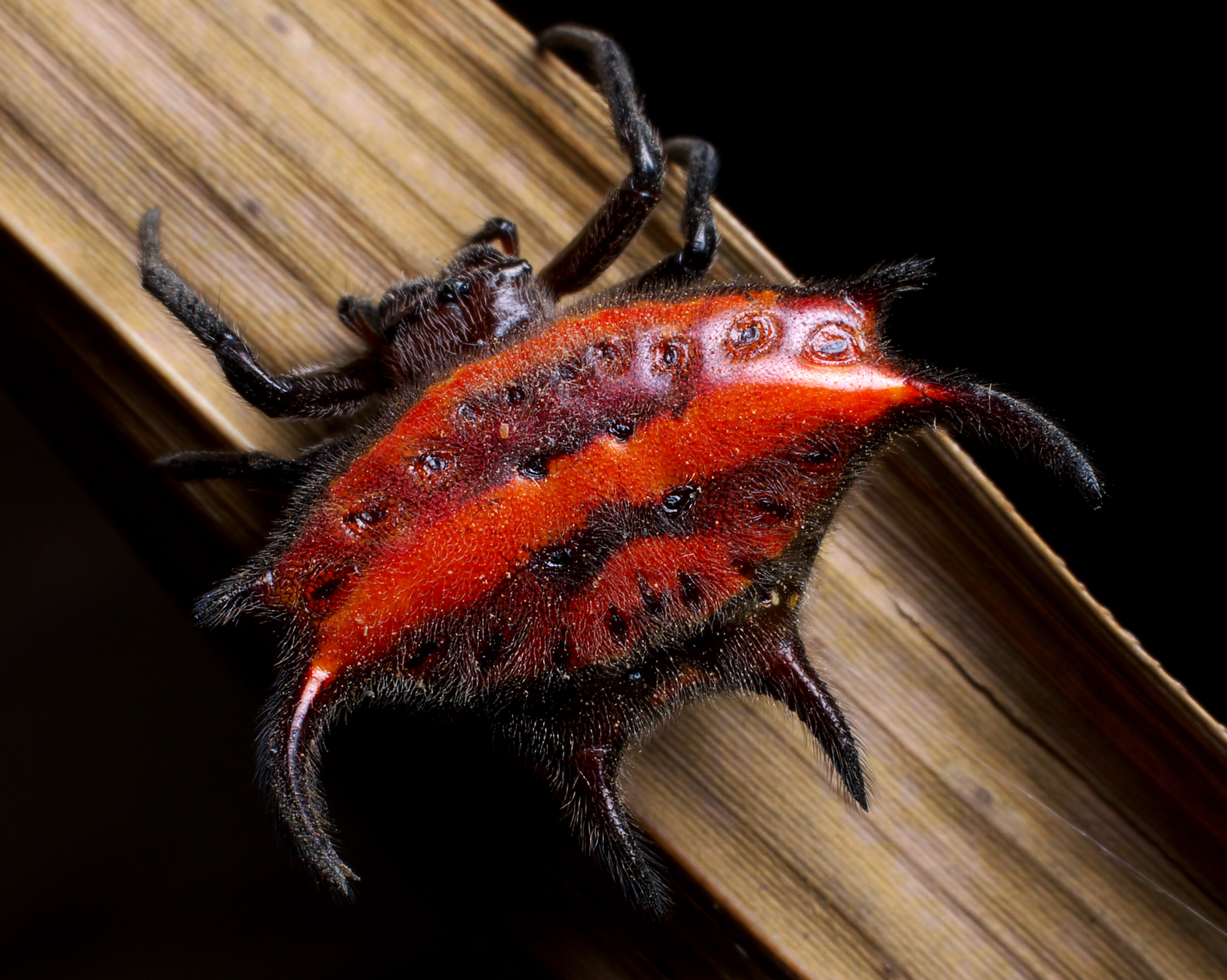
- red female
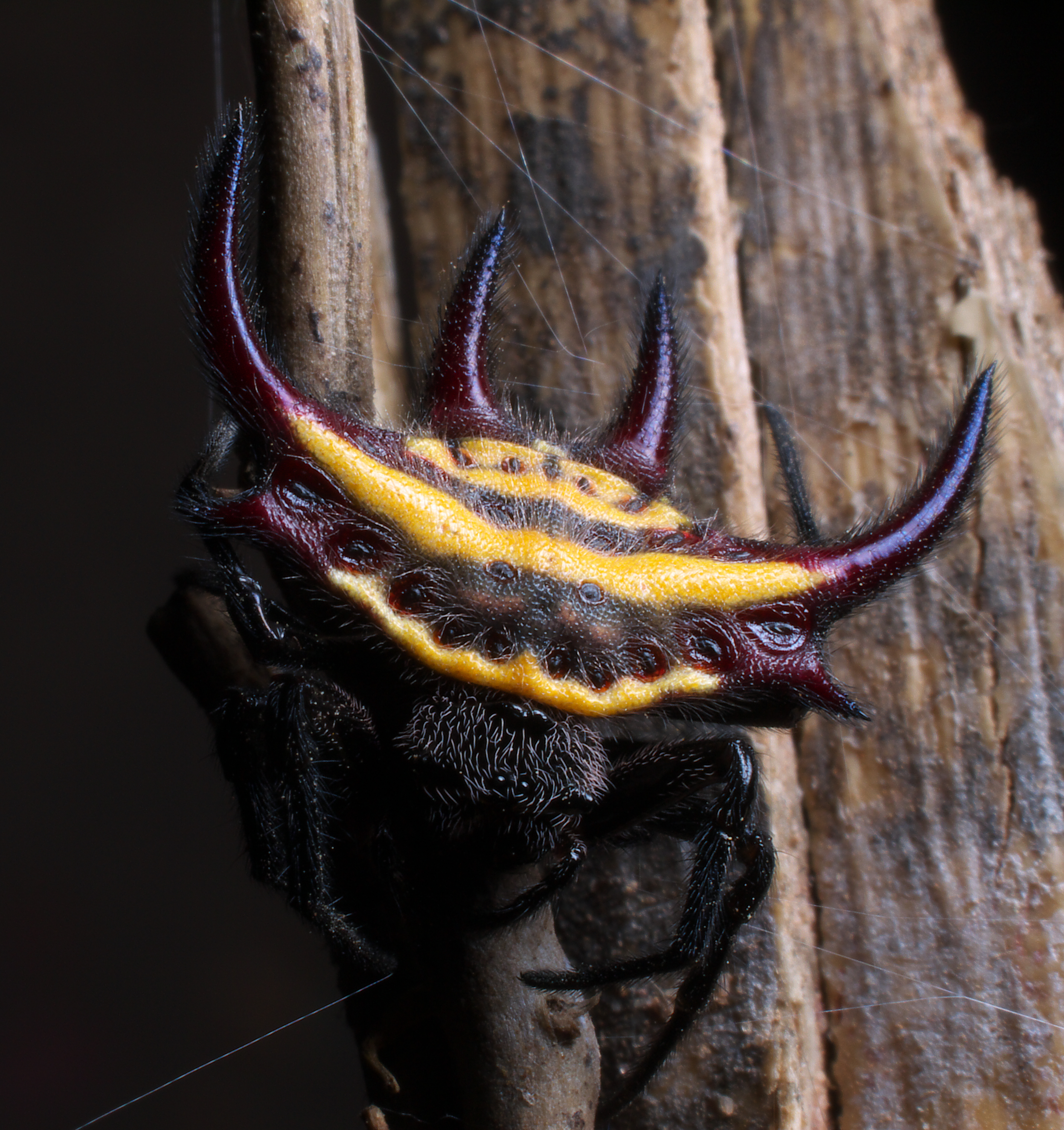
- yellow female

Scientific classification
- Kingdom: Animalia
- Phylum: Arthropoda
- Subphylum: Chelicerata
- Class: Arachnida
- Order: Araneae
- Infraorder: Araneomorphae
- Family: Araneidae
- Genus: Gasteracantha
- Species: G. falcicornis

Binomial name
- Gasteracantha falcicornis Butler, 1873

Synonyms
- Gasteracantha toxotes Gerstaecker, 1873; Gasteracantha resupinata Gerstaecker, 1873; Gasteracantha petersii Karsch, 1878

= Gasteracantha falcicornis =

Long Wing Kite Spider

Species of spider

Gasteracantha falcicornis is a species of spider belonging to the family Araneidae. It is found in eastern and southern Africa.

== Distribution ==
Gasteracantha falcicornis is known from Malawi, Tanzania, Zambia, Eswatini and South Africa.

In South Africa, the species occurs in KwaZulu-Natal and Mpumalanga provinces across a wide geographical range at altitudes from 4 to 750 m above sea level. Notable localities include Empangeni, iSimangaliso Wetland Park (Fanie's Island, Kosi Bay Nature Reserve, Sodwana Bay National Park, Lake Sibaya), Ngoye Forest, Tembe Elephant Park, Avoca, and Komatipoort.

== Habitat and ecology ==
Gasteracantha falcicornis is an orb-web dweller. The webs are usually constructed high in trees or tall shrubs above the observer's eye level. The bridge line is frequently longer than the orb part, giving the impression that the spider is floating in space. The web is sometimes decorated with tufts of silk. The spiders are active during the day and do not remove their webs.

== Description ==
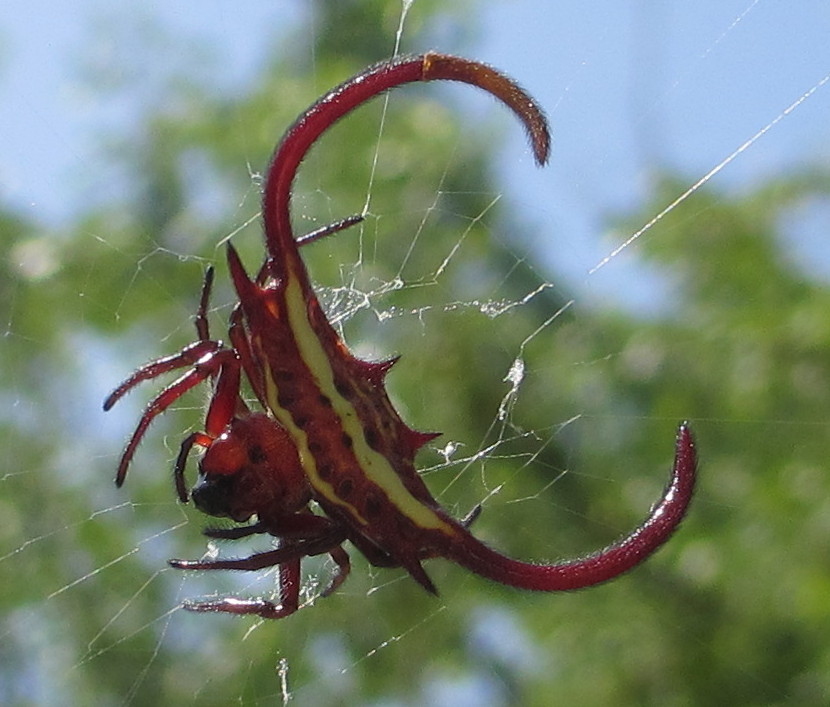
female - dorsal

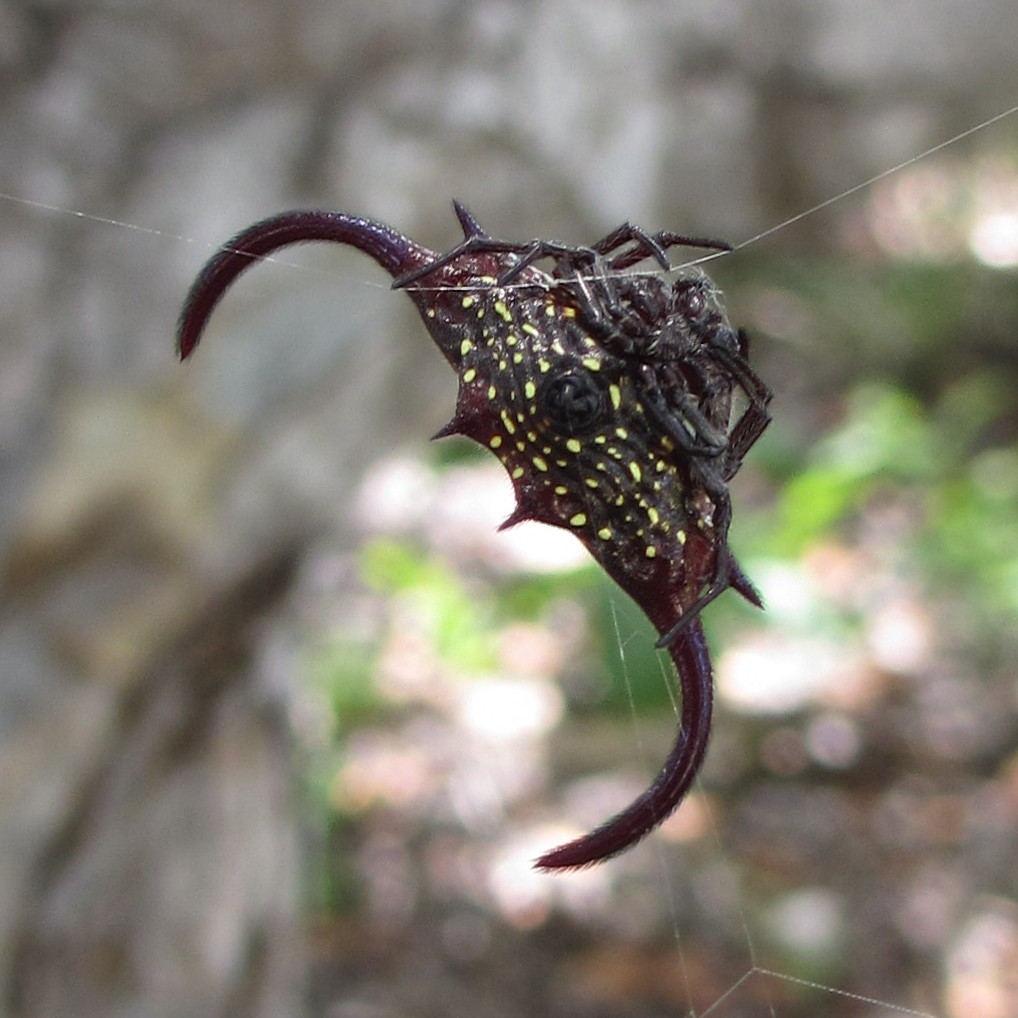
female - ventral

The female, larger and more colourful than the male, has a bright red abdomen decorated with many deep black pits. There is a long, curved black horn at each side and two shorter, straight horns at the front and rear.

== Conservation ==
Gasteracantha falcicornis is listed as Least Concern by the South African National Biodiversity Institute due to its wide geographical range. In South Africa, the species is protected in Kosi Bay Nature Reserve, Ngoye Forest and Tembe Elephant Park. No conservation actions are recommended.

== Taxonomy ==
The species was last revised by Emerit in 1974 and is described only from the female.
