= Gasteracantha flava =

Scientific classification
- Kingdom: Animalia
- Phylum: Arthropoda
- Subphylum: Chelicerata
- Class: Arachnida
- Order: Araneae
- Infraorder: Araneomorphae
- Family: Araneidae
- Genus: Gasteracantha
- Species: G. flava

Binomial name
- Gasteracantha flava Nicolet, 1849

Species of spider

Gasteracantha flava is a species of spider described in 1849 from Chile. The spider's abdomen bears 14 spines (six on each side and two in the rear) and is yellow in color with brown or black sigilla and a strongly wrinkled ventral side. The World Spider Catalog currently treats this taxon as a spiny orb-weaver spider in the genus Gasteracantha. In 1849, H. Nicolet included it in the genus Gasteracantha along with 18 other species he described from Chile. Nicolet described G. flava as being closely allied to another species described at the same time, Gasteracantha spissa, which had the same number and shape of spines and was very similar. Subsequent authors refined Nicolet's species, and in a 1996 publication Herbert Levi wrote, "All Nicolet's species seem to belong in Phoroncidia (Theridiidae)." Levi transferred the 14-spined taxon spissa, described by Nicolet as very similar to G. flava, to the genus Phoroncidia, creating the new combination Phoroncidia spissa. However, Levi did not explicitly address G. flava, so it remains in Gasteracantha as of November 2019, though its purported sister species now belongs to Phoroncidia and no other Gasteracantha species has more than six spines.
