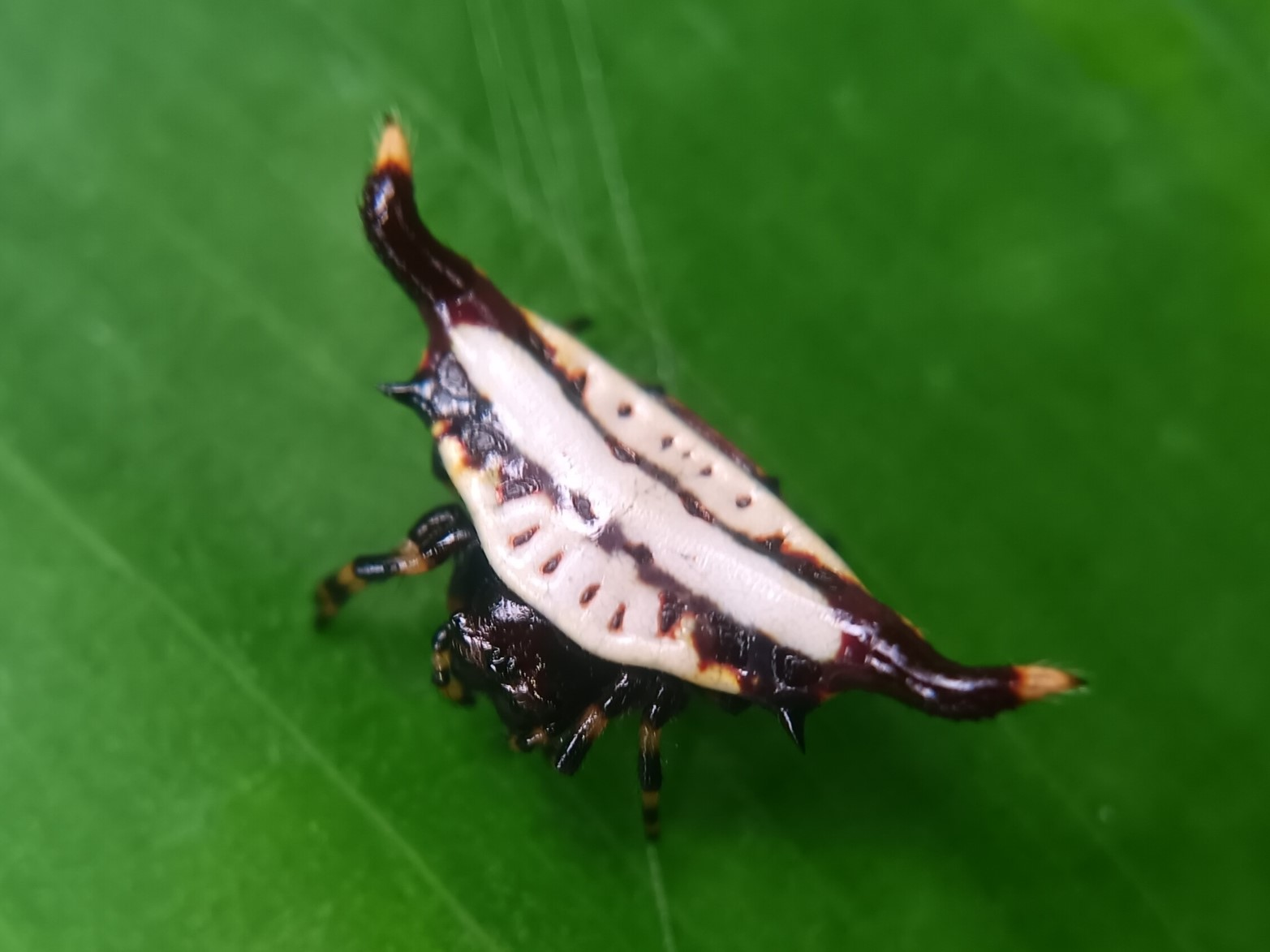

Scientific classification
- Kingdom: Animalia
- Phylum: Arthropoda
- Subphylum: Chelicerata
- Class: Arachnida
- Order: Araneae
- Infraorder: Araneomorphae
- Family: Araneidae
- Genus: Gasteracantha
- Species: G. recurva

Binomial name
- Gasteracantha recurva Simon, 1877

= Gasteracantha recurva =

Species of spider

Gasteracantha recurva is a species of spiny orb-weaver spider. It was first described from Manila, Philippines in 1877.

== Description ==
Gasteracantha recurva was described and illustrated by French naturalist Eugène Simon from a specimen he said was found in Manila by G. A. Baer. Simon wrote that the specimen had an abdomen measuring 8.5 millimeters wide by 5 millimeters long, with two pairs of spines on the sides. The anterior pair was very small and acutely pointed. The second pair was described as nearly five times longer than the first (or 4.2 mm long) and quite robust, jutting out from the abdomen for two-thirds of the spines' length and then curving backward in the last third. These spines bore about ten small tubercles at the point at which they curved backward. The specimen did not bear any spines on the posterior margin of its abdomen. Simon described the upper surface of the abdomen as fawn-red with black spines and sigilla. The ventral surface was black with reddish bands.

In 1914, Friedrich Dahl noted that the Berlin Zoological Museum possessed a single well-preserved dry specimen of the species labeled "Luzon (Jagor)." He described the somewhat sinuous nature of the prominent abdominal spines and the tubercles studded at the bend. He mused that the specimen might represent a deformed individual of Gasteracantha hecata but then rejected the thought.
