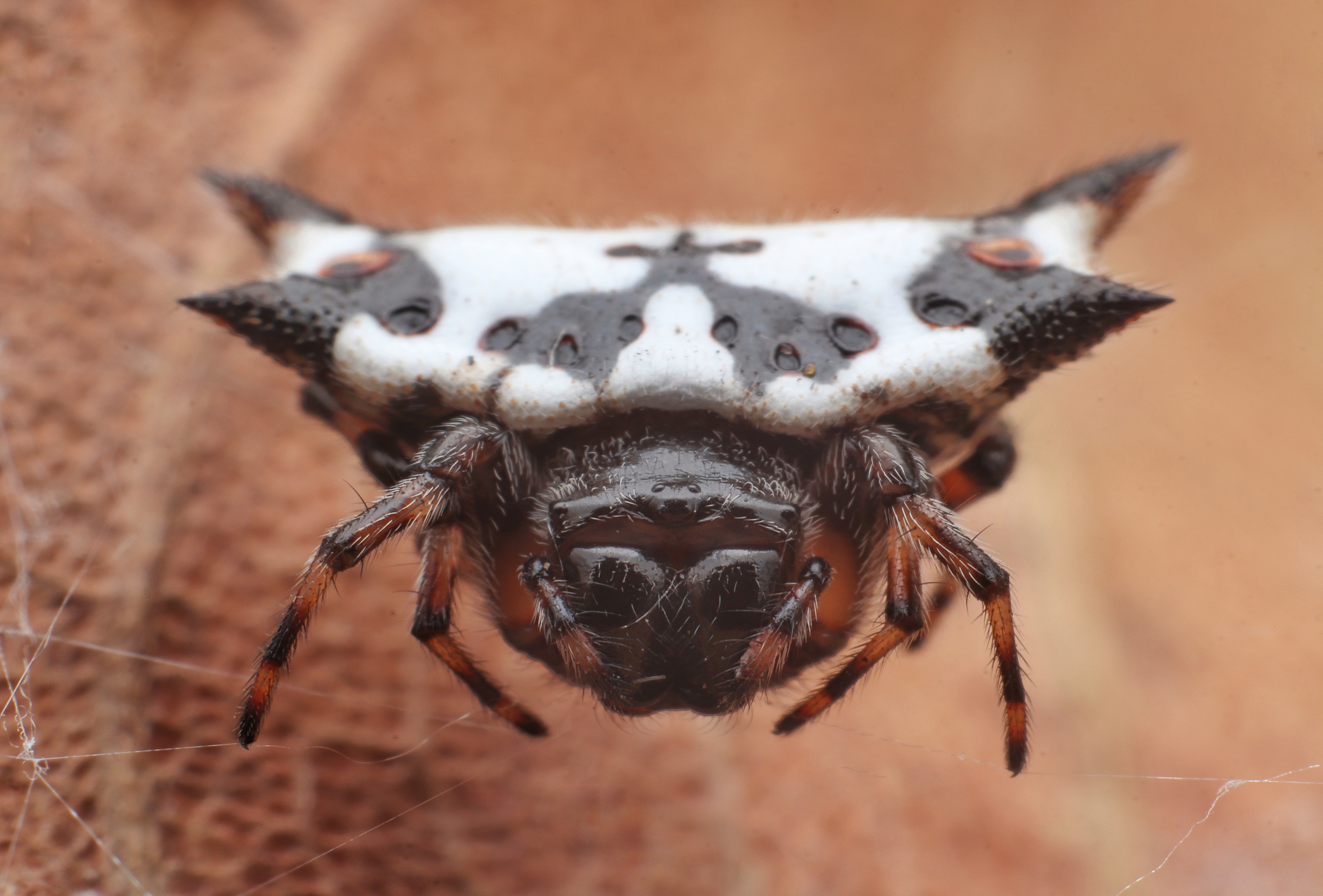
- female from the Philippines

Scientific classification
- Kingdom: Animalia
- Phylum: Arthropoda
- Subphylum: Chelicerata
- Class: Arachnida
- Order: Araneae
- Infraorder: Araneomorphae
- Family: Araneidae
- Genus: Gasteracantha
- Species: G. kuhli

Binomial name
- Gasteracantha kuhli C. L. Koch, 1837

Synonyms
- Plectana acuminata Walckenaer, 1841; Gasteracantha annulipes C. L. Koch, 1844; Plectana leucomelas Doleschall, 1859; Gasteracantha annamita Simon, 1886; Gasteracantha leucomelaena Thorell, 1887; Gasteracantha nabona Chamberlin, 1924

= Gasteracantha kuhli =

Black-and-white spiny spider

Species of arachnid

Gasteracantha kuhli is a species of spiny orb-weaver spider in the genus Gasteracantha, widespread from India to Japan, the Philippines, and Java in Indonesia. It is known as the black-and-white spiny spider.

== Description ==
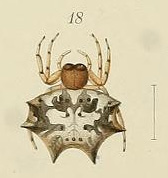
female G. kuhli from 1906 paper

Female black-and-white spiny spiders are 6–9 millimeters wide and possess hard, shiny abdomens armed with six black conical spines. The upper surface of the abdomen is white to yellowish with variable black or dark brown markings and sigilla. The central part of the abdomen's dorsal surface is usually marked with a dark cross-like shape. From individual to individual and across the species' range, the length of the spines and the details of the coloration vary considerably. Males are much smaller at 3–4 millimeters in size, and in place of spines, they have small bumps on their abdomens.

== Behavior ==
This species builds orb webs in open forests and shrubby areas and waits for prey in the center of the web.

== Similar species ==
Gasteracantha kuhli is replaced by a similar black-and-white species, Gasteracantha interrupta, on the Lesser Sundas and Sulawesi.
