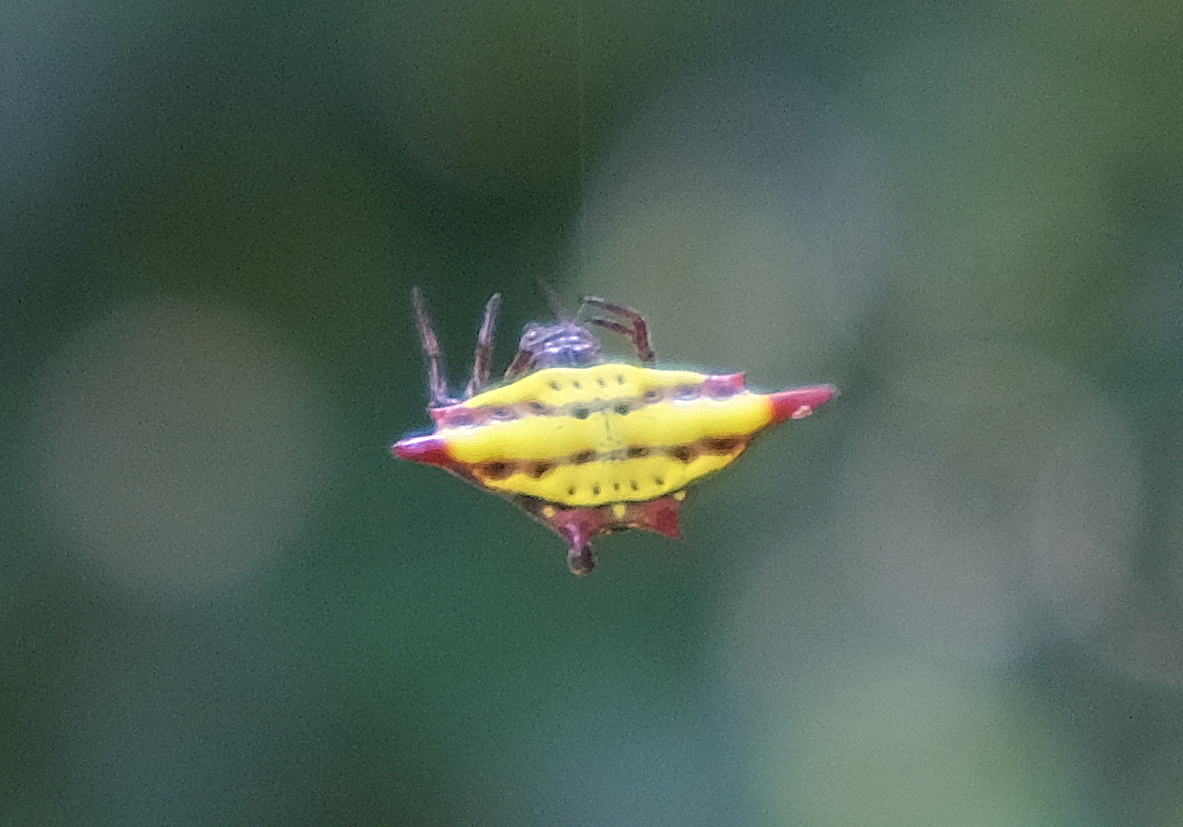
- Upper side

Scientific classification
- Domain: Eukaryota
- Kingdom: Animalia
- Phylum: Arthropoda
- Subphylum: Chelicerata
- Class: Arachnida
- Order: Araneae
- Infraorder: Araneomorphae
- Family: Araneidae
- Genus: Gasteracantha
- Species: G. sturi

Binomial name
- Gasteracantha sturi (Doleschall, 1857)

Synonyms
- Plectana sturii Doleschall, 1857; Plectana centrum Doleschall, 1857; Gasteracantha nigristernis Simon, 1899

= Gasteracantha sturi =

Species of spider

Gasteracantha sturi, commonly known as the blunt-spined kite spider, is a species of spider belonging to the family Araneidae. It is found in Southeast Asia, from Laos to the Moluccas.

The abdomen is much broader than long and bright yellow with two black cross lines. The lateral corners have thick, blunt spikes with two shorter, sharper spikes both on the front and rear margins. All the spikes are black.

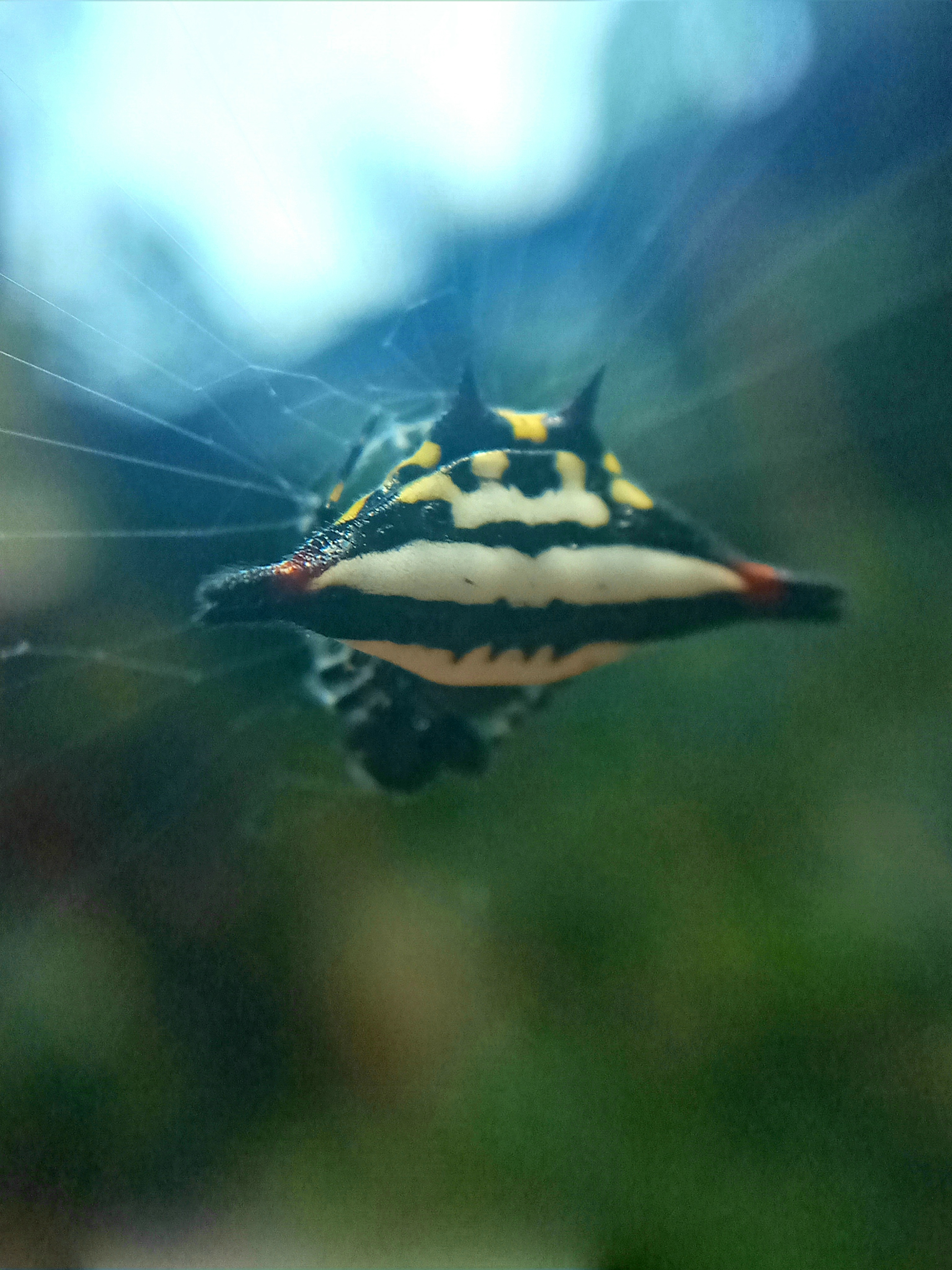
A Gasteracantha sturi found in Sri Lanka
