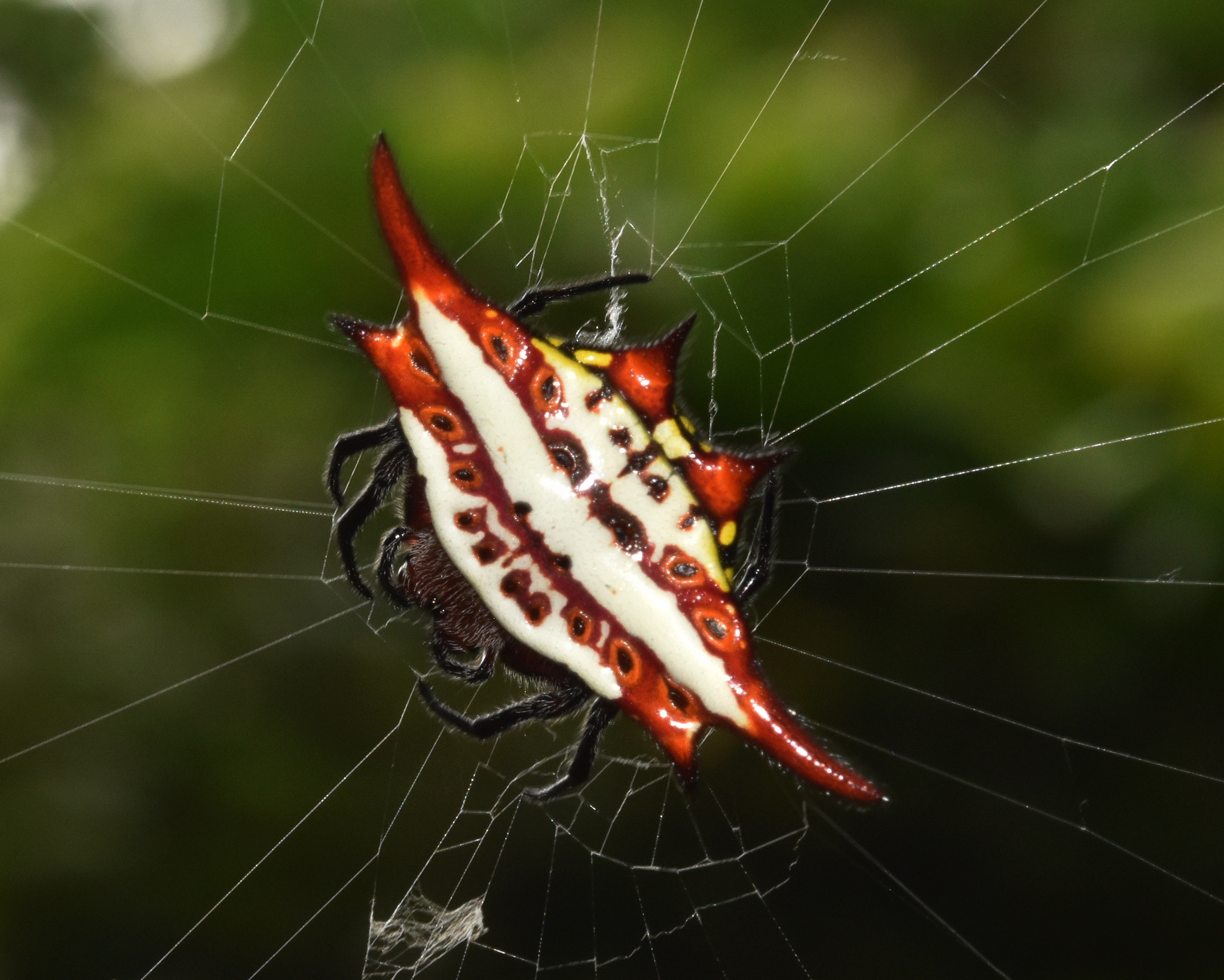
- female
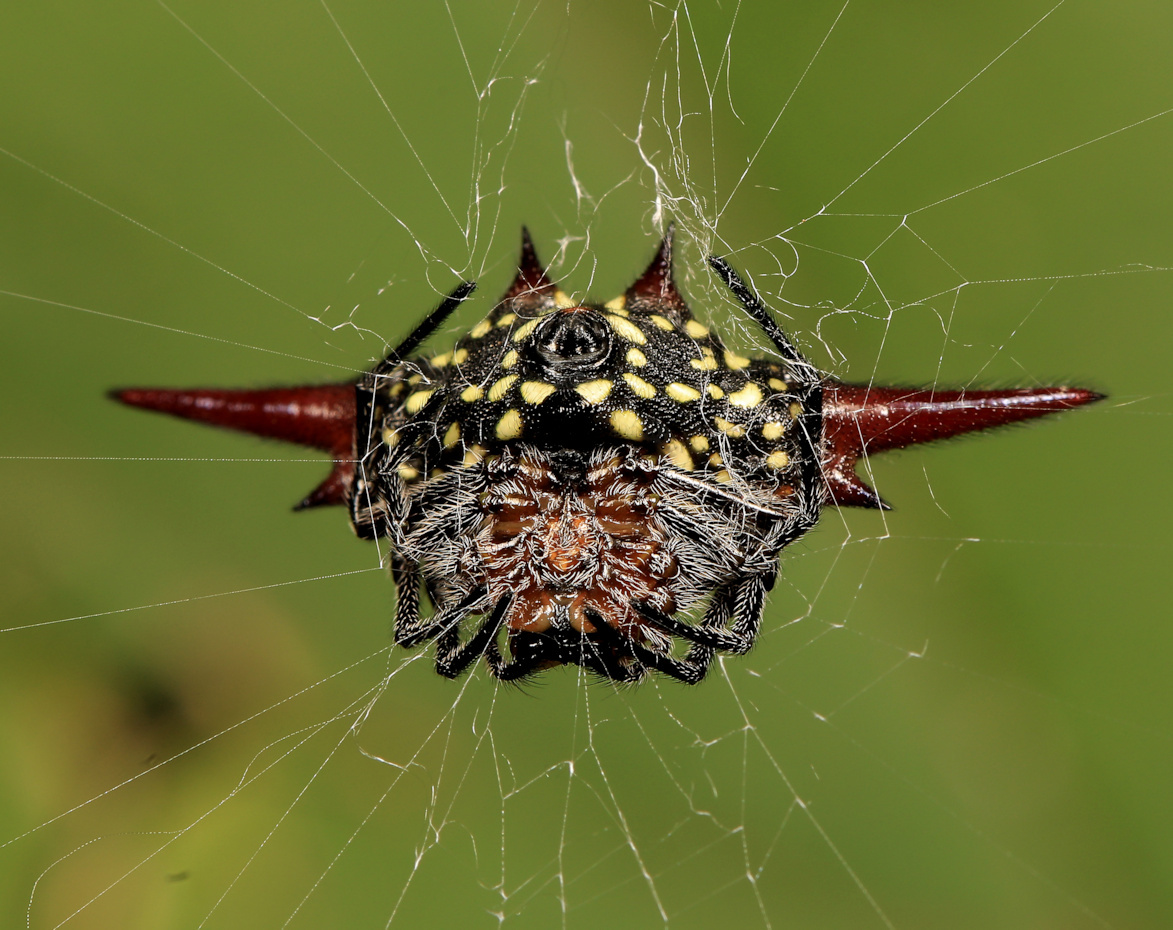
- female from below

Scientific classification
- Kingdom: Animalia
- Phylum: Arthropoda
- Subphylum: Chelicerata
- Class: Arachnida
- Order: Araneae
- Infraorder: Araneomorphae
- Family: Araneidae
- Genus: Gasteracantha
- Species: G. milvoides

Binomial name
- Gasteracantha milvoides Butler, 1873

Synonyms
- Gasteracantha macrura Pocock, 1898; Paurotylus depressus Tullgren, 1910

= Gasteracantha milvoides =

Medium Wing Kite Spider

Species of spider

Gasteracantha milvoides is an African species of spider in the family Araneidae. It is commonly known as the medium wing kite spider.

== Distribution ==
Gasteracantha milvoides is known from Central African Republic, Kenya, Namibia, Zimbabwe, Eswatini and South Africa.

The South African distribution includes Eastern Cape, KwaZulu-Natal, Limpopo, and Mpumalanga provinces, where the species occurs in numerous protected areas including Hluhluwe Nature Reserve, iSimangaliso Wetland Parks, Ndumo Game Reserve, Kruger National Park, and Lekgalameetse Nature Reserve.

== Habitat and ecology ==
Gasteracantha milvoides is an orb-web dweller commonly found in warmer tropical regions. The orb-webs are usually constructed in trees or tall shrubs, from waist height to above the observer's eye level. The bridge line is frequently longer than the orb part, giving the impression that the spider is floating in space. The web is sometimes decorated with tufts of silk. The spiders are active during the day and do not remove their webs.

The species has been sampled from the Forest, Indian Ocean Coastal Belt, Grassland, Savanna and Thicket biomes at altitudes from 5 to 1,341 m above sea level.

== Conservation ==
Gasteracantha milvoides is listed as Least Concern by the South African National Biodiversity Institute due to its wide geographical range. The species is protected in more than 18 protected areas including Ndumo Game Reserve, Kruger National Park and Lekgalameetse Nature Reserve. No conservation actions are recommended.

== Taxonomy ==
The species was last revised by Emerit in 1973 and is known from both sexes.
