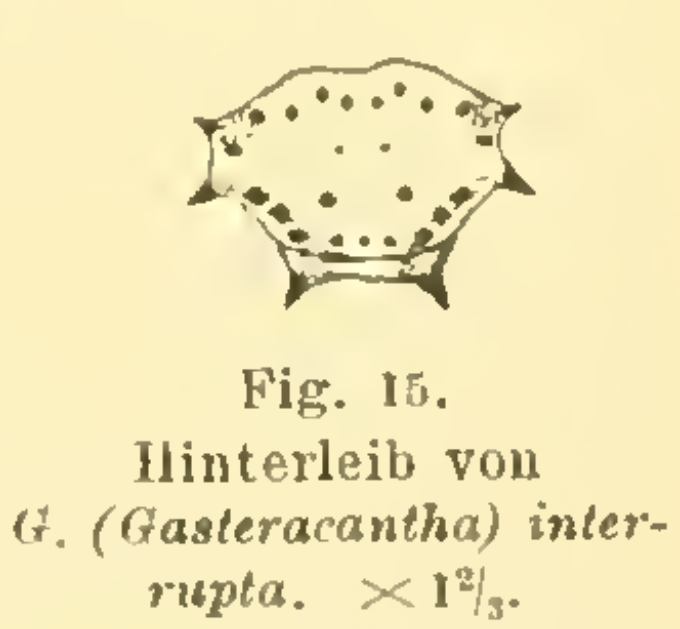

Scientific classification
- Kingdom: Animalia
- Phylum: Arthropoda
- Subphylum: Chelicerata
- Class: Arachnida
- Order: Araneae
- Infraorder: Araneomorphae
- Family: Araneidae
- Genus: Gasteracantha
- Species: G. interrupta

Binomial name
- Gasteracantha interrupta Dahl, 1914

= Gasteracantha interrupta =

Species of spider

Gasteracantha interrupta is a species of spiny orb-weaver spider in the genus Gasteracantha. It is black and white in color, and it occurs in the Lesser Sundas and Sulawesi in Indonesia.

== Description ==
Female Gasteracantha interrupta spiders have hardened, shell-like abdomens that are black and white in color and armed with six spines. Friedrich Dahl described this species in 1914 based on five specimens from Sulawesi and Lombok. Dahl distinguished this species from another black-and-white species, the wide-ranging Gasteracantha kuhli, based on a plain white central area on the dorsal side of the abdomen and details of the sigilla. In particular, Dahl noted that the outermost sigilla in the anterior row are very close to the anterior spines, instead of partway between the anterior and median spines. Between those outermost anterior sigilla and the median spines, the abdomen is white, whereas in G. kuhli this area usually has dark coloring. He also noted that the three sigilla extending back from the median spine toward the posterior edge of the abdomen form a concave curve in G. interrupta but a straight line in G. kuhli.

The male of this species has not been scientifically described.
