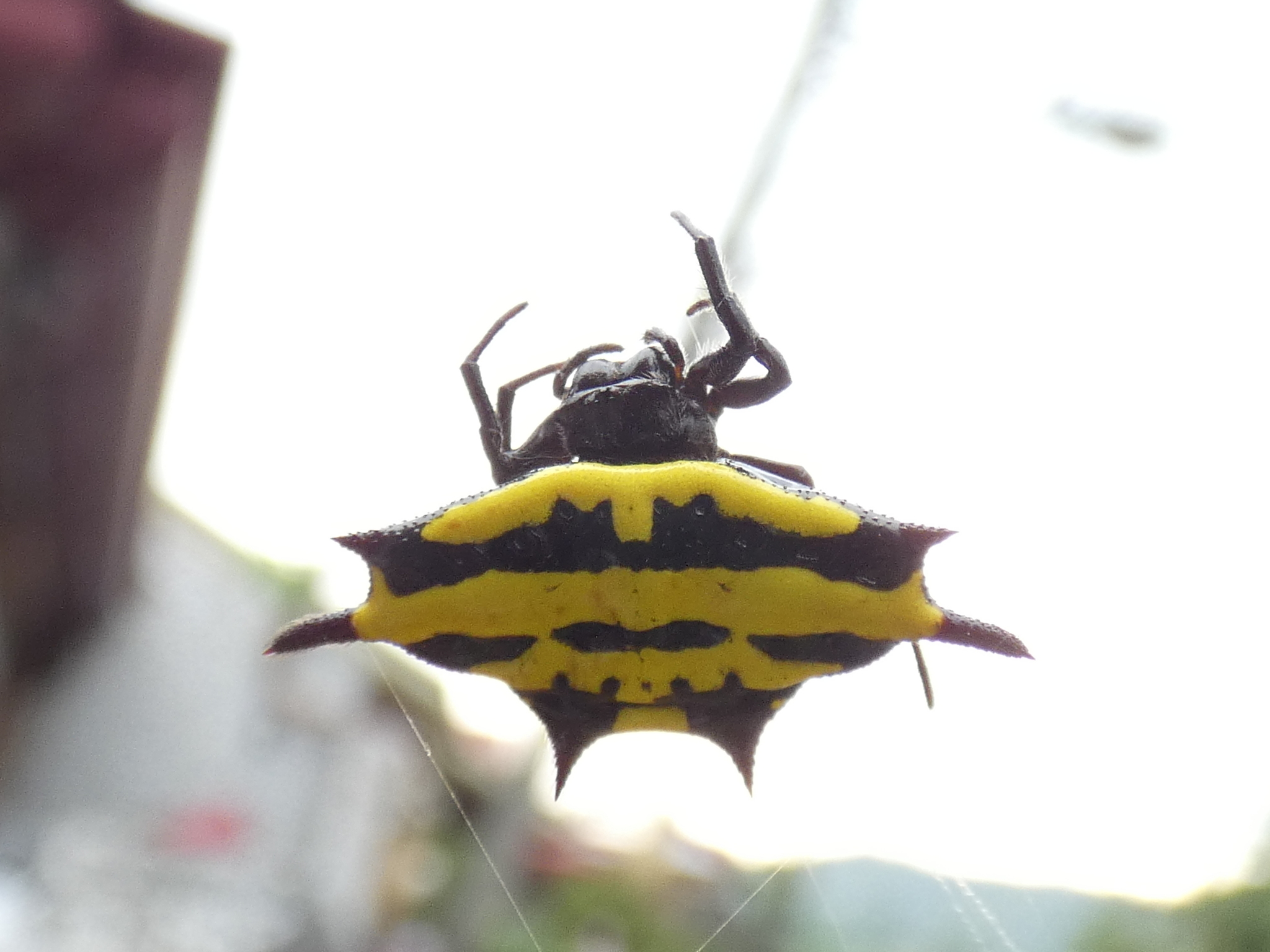
- female from the Philippines

Scientific classification
- Kingdom: Animalia
- Phylum: Arthropoda
- Subphylum: Chelicerata
- Class: Arachnida
- Order: Araneae
- Infraorder: Araneomorphae
- Family: Araneidae
- Genus: Gasteracantha
- Species: G. panisicca

Binomial name
- Gasteracantha panisicca Butler, 1873

Synonyms
- Gasteracantha panisicea Kolosváry, 1931

= Gasteracantha panisicca =

Species of spider

Gasteracantha panisicca is a species of orb weaver spider in the genus Gasteracantha. It was first described by Arthur Gardiner Butler in 1873 and is found across Southeast Asia.

== Taxonomy ==
The species was first described by Arthur Gardiner Butler in 1873 based on a female specimen from the Philippines. The taxonomic history of this species includes some uncertainty, as Dahl (1914) considered it a doubtful synonym of Gasteracantha diadesmia, a view that was accepted by Roewer but later revalidated by Tikader in 1970.

== Distribution ==
G. panisicca has a wide distribution across Southeast Asia, ranging from Myanmar through the Philippines and extending to Indonesia (specifically Java).

== Description ==
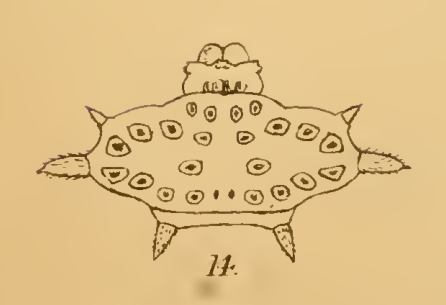
Drawing of female from Butler 1873

Based on Butler's original description, the female of G. panisicca has distinctive characteristics typical of Gasteracantha spiders. The abdomen measures 2 1/2 lines in length with a breadth of 5 1/2 lines at its widest part, excluding the spines. The total length reaches 3 2/3 lines, with prominent spines extending from the abdomen.

The cephalothorax and abdomen structure resembles that of G. taeniata, with six angles from which spines emerge. The abdomen features four central and eighteen marginal black spots impressed into its surface. The dorsal coloration is pale testaceous or whitey-brown with rugose texture, while the margins are speckled with black granules. The spines themselves are black, rugose, and pilose. The ventral surface is whitey-brown, speckled with black granules and featuring black impressed spots around the margin, along with the characteristic black conical projection typical of the genus.
