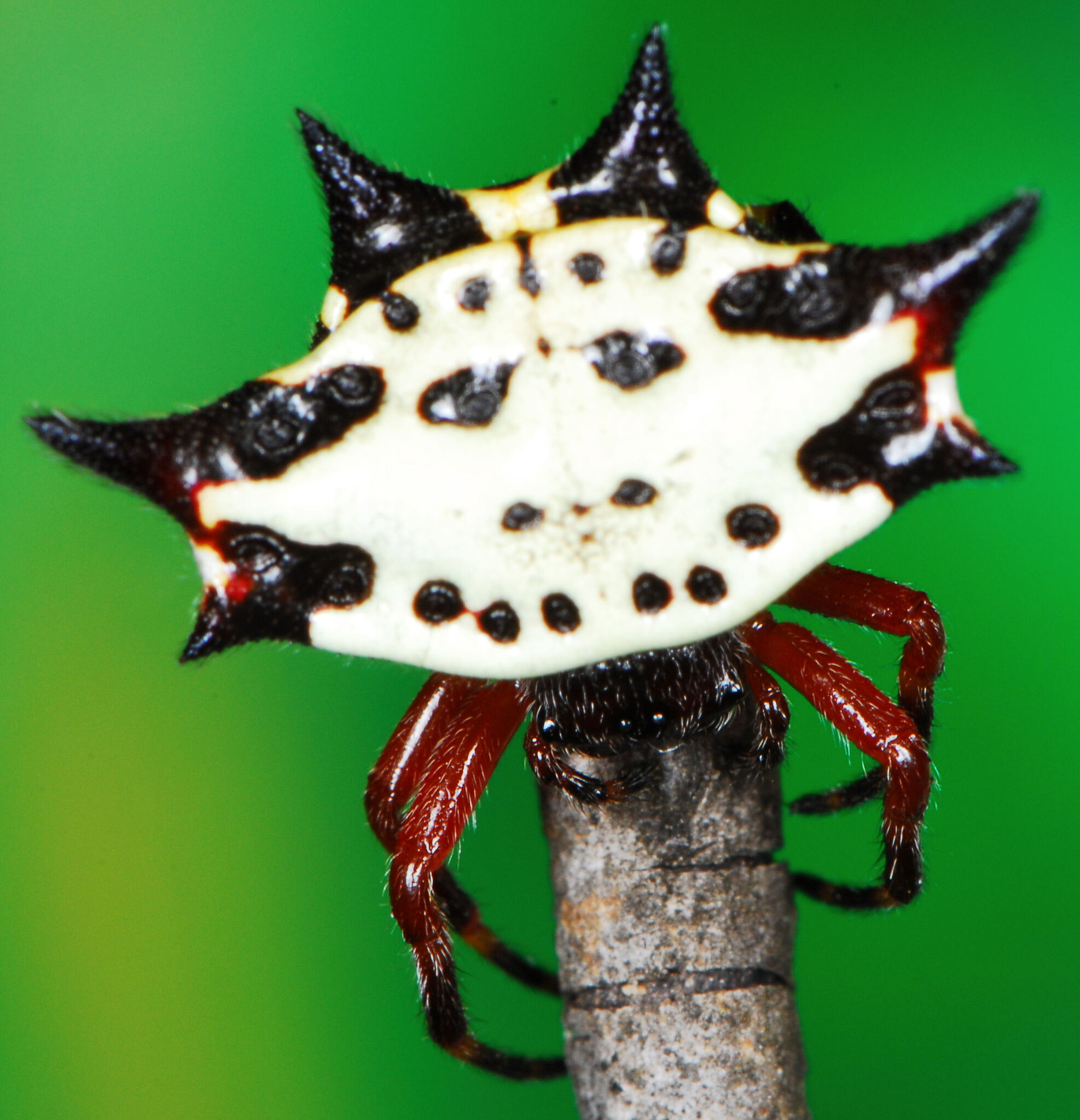
- female
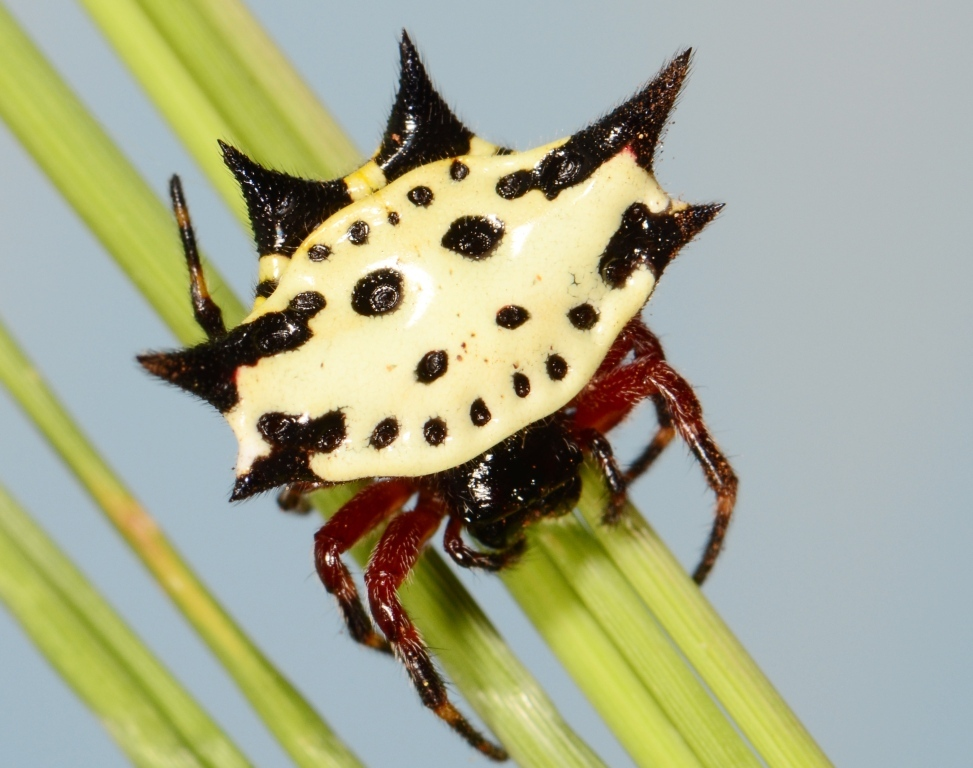
- juvenile female

Scientific classification
- Kingdom: Animalia
- Phylum: Arthropoda
- Subphylum: Chelicerata
- Class: Arachnida
- Order: Araneae
- Infraorder: Araneomorphae
- Family: Araneidae
- Genus: Gasteracantha
- Species: G. sanguinolenta

Binomial name
- Gasteracantha sanguinolenta C. L. Koch, 1844

Synonyms
- G. ensifera Thorell, 1859; G. ornata Thorell, 1859; G. lepida O. Pickard-Cambridge, 1871; G. radiata Gerstaecker, 1873; G. impotens Gerstaecker, 1873; G. nana Butler, 1873; G. molesta O. Pickard-Cambridge, 1879; G. importuna O. Pickard-Cambridge, 1879; G. formosa confluxa Karsch, 1884; G. schweinfurthi Simon, 1890; G. sodalis O. Pickard-Cambridge, 1898; G. spenceri Pocock, 1900; G. abyssinica Strand, 1907; G. occidentalis Dahl, 1914

= Gasteracantha sanguinolenta =

Short-Wing Kite Spider

Species of spider

Gasteracantha sanguinolenta is a species of spider in the family Araneidae. It is commonly known as the short-wing kite spider. The species is found throughout Africa.

== Distribution ==
Gasteracantha sanguinolenta is known throughout Africa, and also occurs in São Tomé, Yemen (Socotra), and the Seychelles.

In South Africa, the species occurs in eight of the nine provinces across a very large geographical range at altitudes from 6 to 1,556 m above sea level, where it has been recorded from Eastern Cape, Free State, Gauteng, KwaZulu-Natal, Limpopo, Mpumalanga, North West, and Western Cape provinces. It occurs in numerous localities including Addo Elephant National Park, Roodeplaatdam Nature Reserve, Kruger National Park, and Table Mountain National Park.

== Habitat and ecology ==
Gasteracantha sanguinolenta is an orb-web dweller commonly found in warmer tropical regions. The orb-webs are usually constructed high in trees or tall shrubs above the observer's eye level. The bridge line is frequently longer than the orb part, giving the impression that the spider is floating in space. The web is sometimes decorated with tufts of silk. The spiders are active during the day and do not remove their webs. The species has been sampled from all floral biomes except the Nama and Succulent Karoo biomes.

== Description ==
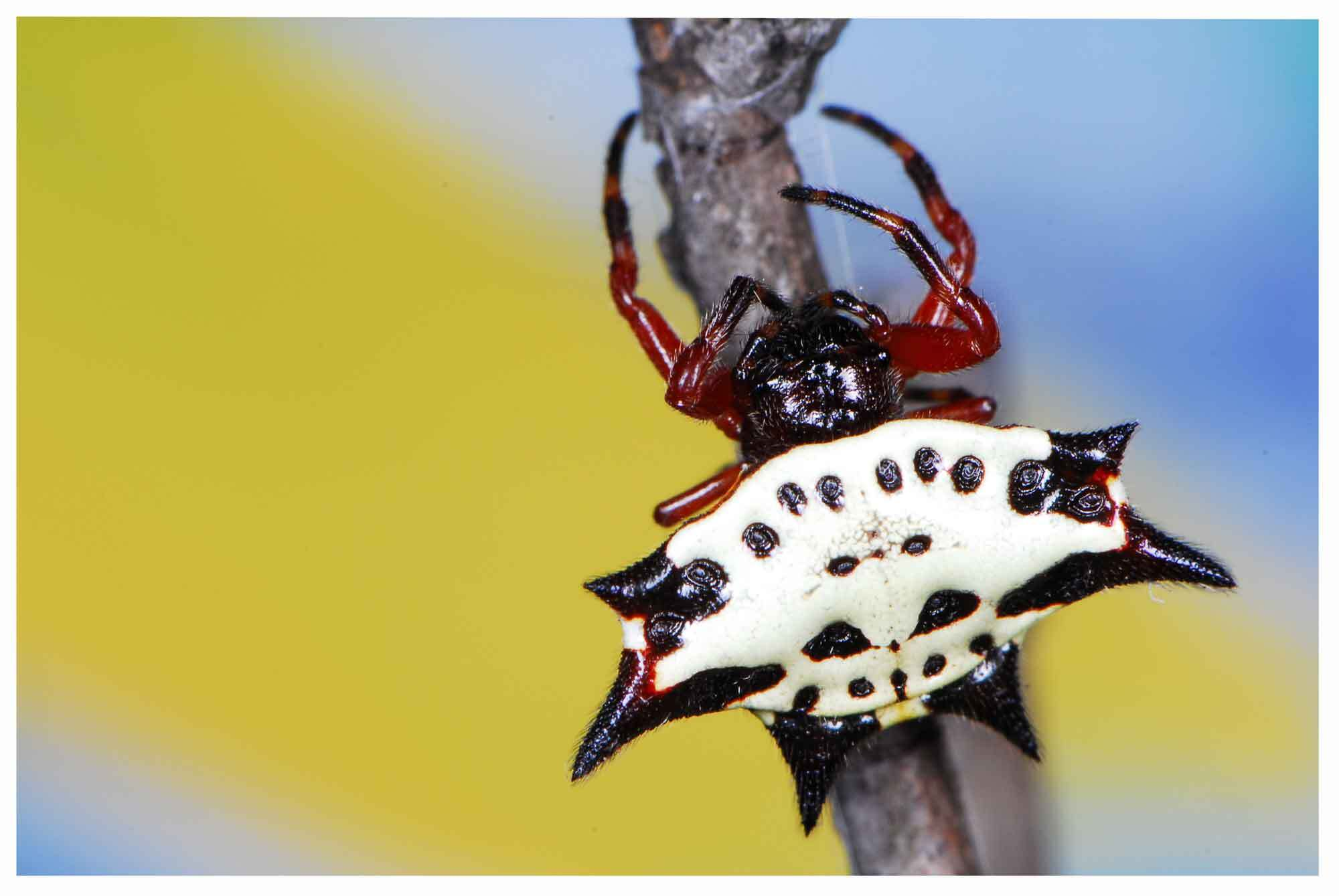
female

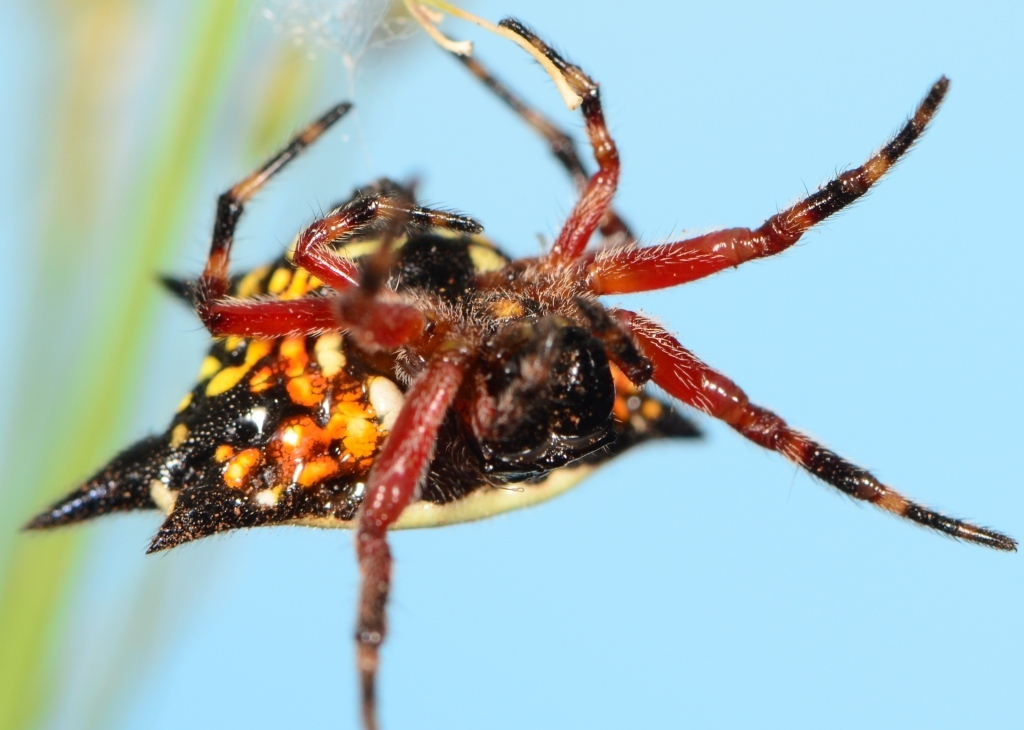
juvenile female

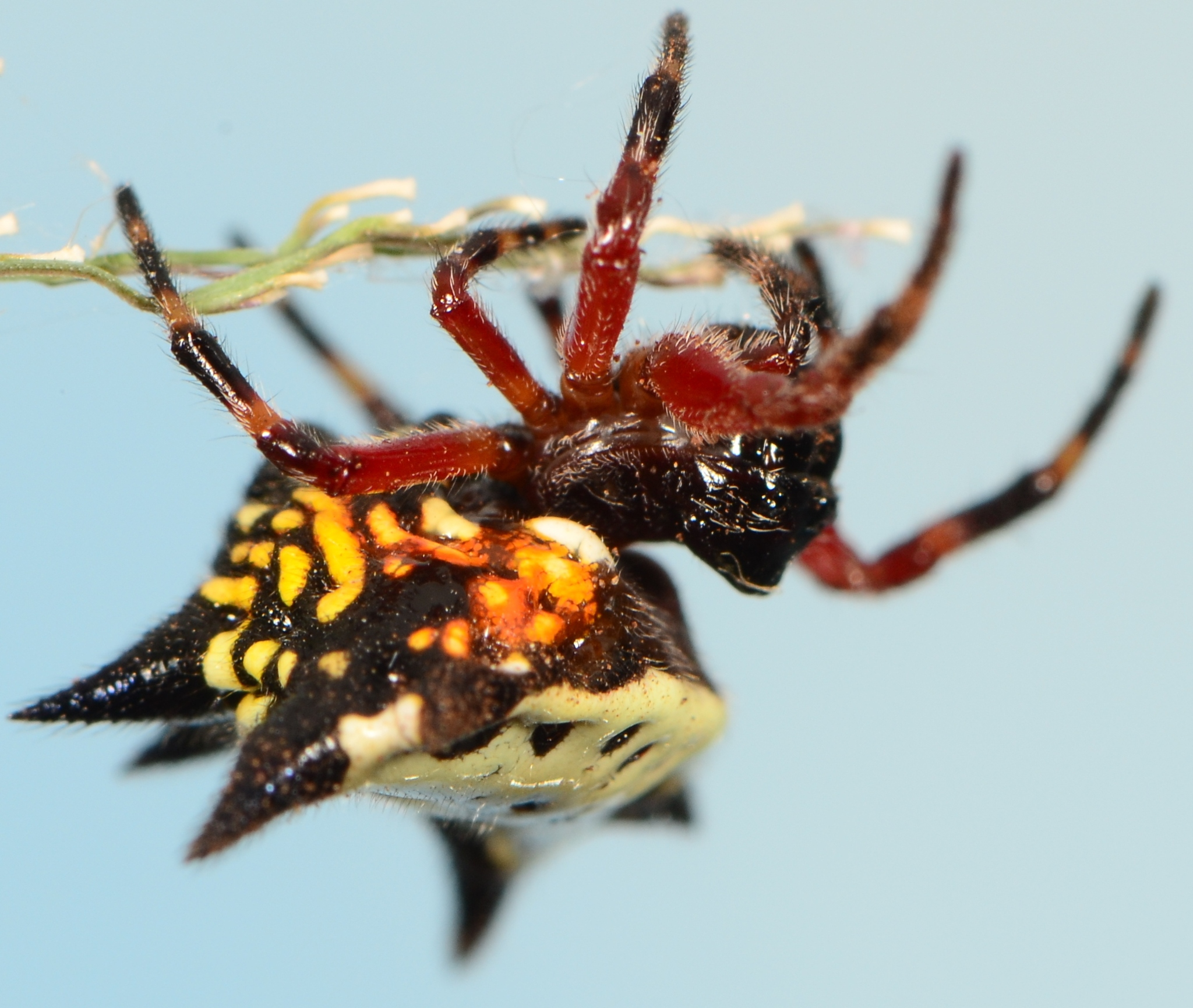
juvenile female

== Conservation ==
Gasteracantha sanguinolenta is listed as Least Concern by the South African National Biodiversity Institute due to its wide global distribution. The species is protected in more than ten protected areas including Lhuvhondo Nature Reserve, Kruger National Park, Polokwane Nature Reserve and Lekgalameetse Nature Reserve. No conservation actions are recommended.

== Taxonomy ==
The species was last revised by Emerit in 1974 and is known from both sexes.
