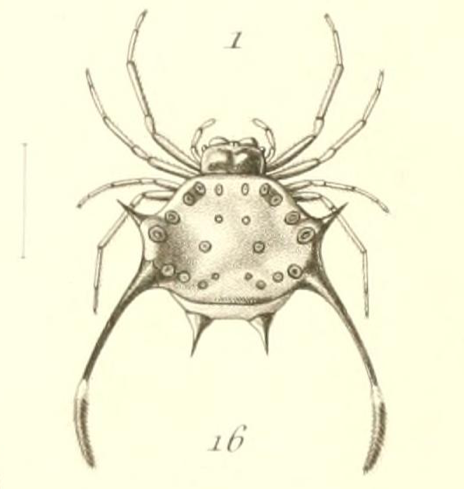

Scientific classification
- Kingdom: Animalia
- Phylum: Arthropoda
- Subphylum: Chelicerata
- Class: Arachnida
- Order: Araneae
- Infraorder: Araneomorphae
- Family: Araneidae
- Genus: Gasteracantha
- Species: G. clavigera

Binomial name
- Gasteracantha clavigera Giebel, 1863

Synonyms
- Gasteracantha nigrisparsa, Gasteracantha scoparia

= Gasteracantha clavigera =

Species of arachnid

Gasteracantha clavigera is a species of spider in the spiny orb-weaver genus Gasteracantha.

== Distribution ==
Gasteracantha clavigera occurs in the Philippines. Dahl (1914) noted specimens from Manila and Samar and contemporary studies and observations report the species from several islands in the Philippines.

The original specimens described by Giebel had come to him labeled Siam, but he noted that the beetles in the same collection seemed like beetles from the Philippines and expressed doubt that the spider specimens had actually come from Thailand either. Dahl echoed his doubt and noted two additional specimens labeled only "Ostindien," a broad and old-fashioned German term that included lands from India to the Philippines and Indonesia.

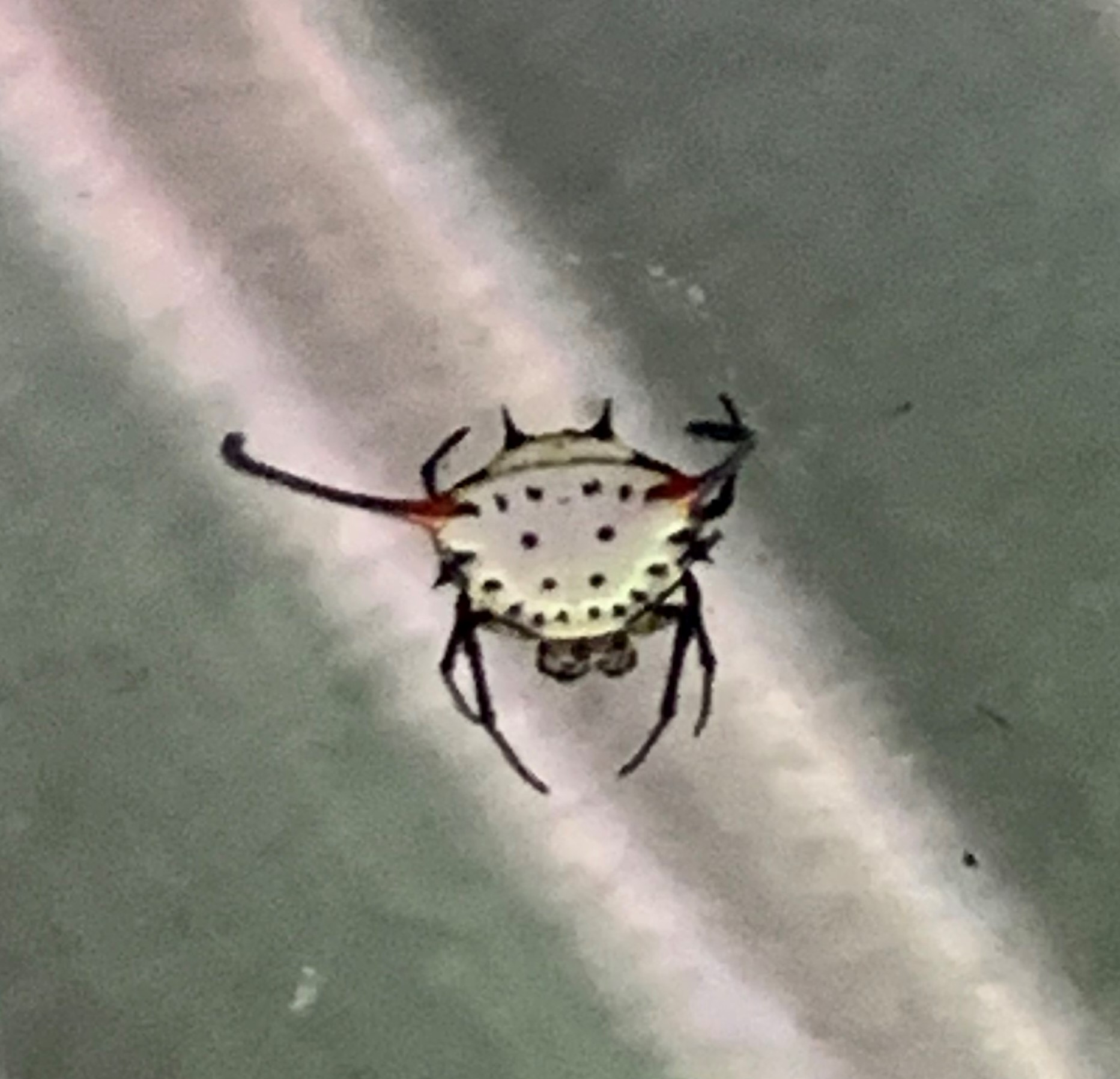

== Description ==
Female G. clavigera possess two dramatic spines, each about twice as long (17–19 mm) as the width of the abdomen (8 mm), with curved, hairy, club-like ends and a ring of white hairs on the shaft of the spine just below each "club." Two pairs of much smaller spines arm the front and rear of the abdomen. The hardened, shell-like abdomen is yellow or white above with dark sigilla.

== Gasteracantha janopol ==
In a 1995 book titled Riceland Spiders of South and Southeast Asia, A.T. Barrion and J.A. Litsinger described a spider from Luzon that they named Gasteracantha janopol (named for Janopol Village). The species is currently accepted by the World Spider Catalog. Their description, measurements, and illustrations closely match 19th-century descriptions and figures of G. clavigera, but the authors do not reference G. clavigera nor explain how their specimen differs from it. Barrion and Litsinger's illustration does not show a white ring of hairs on the median spines, but Dahl noted in 1914 that earlier authors sometimes omitted that feature in their descriptions.
