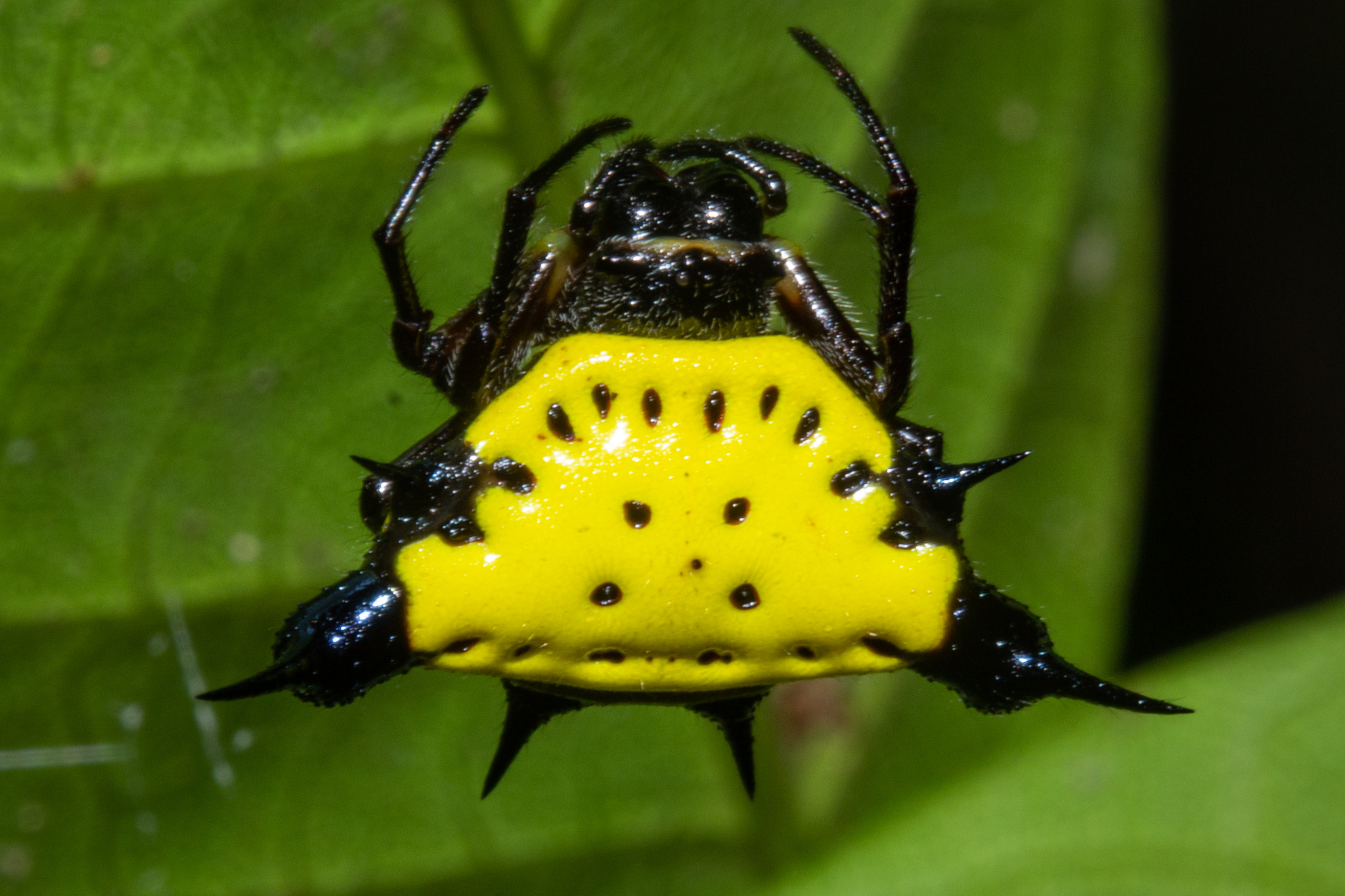
- A. globulata in Malaysia
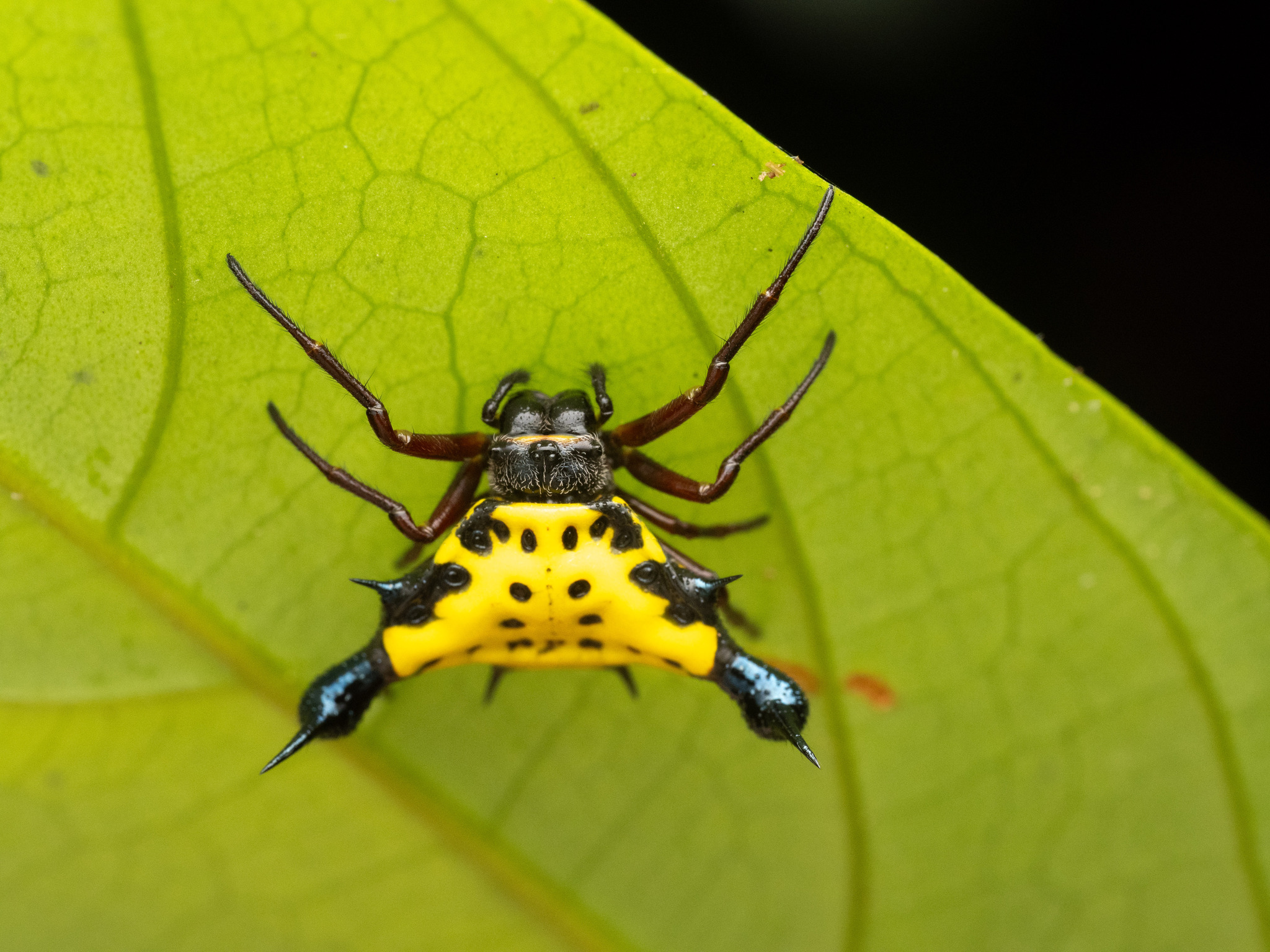
- A. globulata in Malaysia

Scientific classification
- Kingdom: Animalia
- Phylum: Arthropoda
- Subphylum: Chelicerata
- Class: Arachnida
- Order: Araneae
- Infraorder: Araneomorphae
- Family: Araneidae
- Genus: Actinacantha; Simon, 1864
- Species: A. globulata

Binomial name
- Actinacantha globulata Simon, 1864

= Actinacantha =

Genus of spiders

Actinacantha is a genus of Southeast Asian orb-weaver spiders containing the single species, Actinacantha globulata. It was first described by Eugène Simon in 1864, and has only been described from Sumatra, Java in Indonesia.
