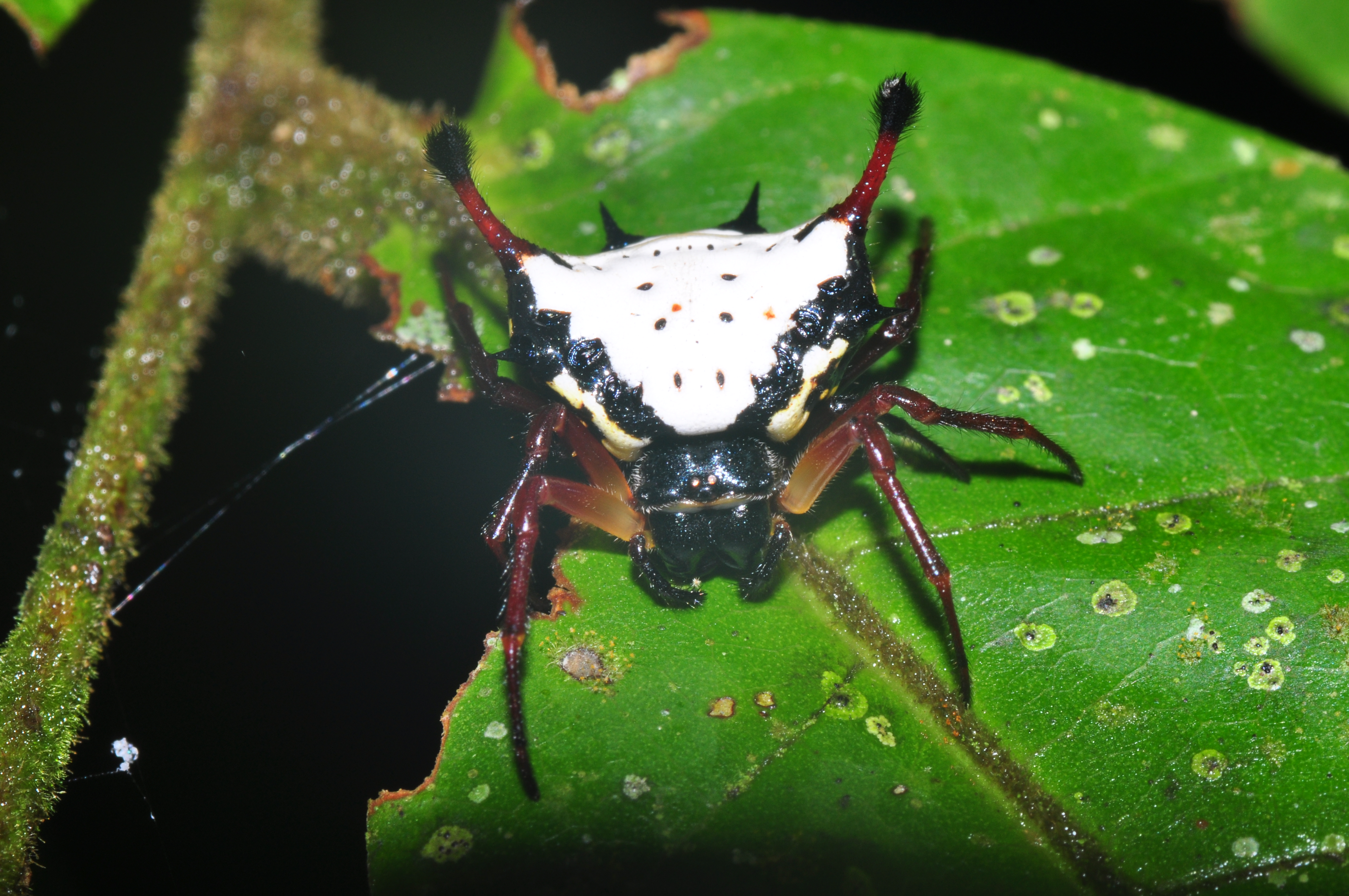

Scientific classification
- Domain: Eukaryota
- Kingdom: Animalia
- Phylum: Arthropoda
- Subphylum: Chelicerata
- Class: Arachnida
- Order: Araneae
- Infraorder: Araneomorphae
- Family: Araneidae
- Genus: Gasteracantha
- Species: G. clavatrix

Binomial name
- Gasteracantha clavatrix (Walckenaer, 1841)

Synonyms
- Plectana clavatrix, Gasteracantha claveata

= Gasteracantha clavatrix =

Species of arachnid

Gasteracantha clavatrix is a species of spider of the genus Gasteracantha. It occurs in Indonesia.

== Distribution ==
Gasteracantha clavatrix is known from Sulawesi. Dahl reported a specimen from Lombok that he regarded as very similar, and World Spider Catalog also includes Mentawai Islands Regency in the species' range.

== Description ==
Females of the species have six abdominal spines. The front and rear pairs are short and sharp; the middle spines are elongated and club-shaped, narrowing along their length and expanding at the end into a bulbous, hairy tip armed with a sharp conical point. These median spines are about as long as the abdomen is wide but may be slightly shorter or longer. The hard, shiny upper surface of the abdomen is white or yellow with dark sigilla and a black border along the anterior edge.

In 1879, O. Pickard-Cambridge described a specimen from Sulawesi that he named Gasteracantha claveata on the basis of its longer, more dramatically shaped median spines and its apparent lack of a black anterior band on the upper surface of the abdomen, though he also wrote that the color was "no doubt much faded by the drying of the specimen." Dahl wrote in 1914 that he believed the variation Pickard-Cambridge described was within the range of possible variation for the species and thus did not warrant species status, so Dahl synomized G. claveata with G. clavatrix.
