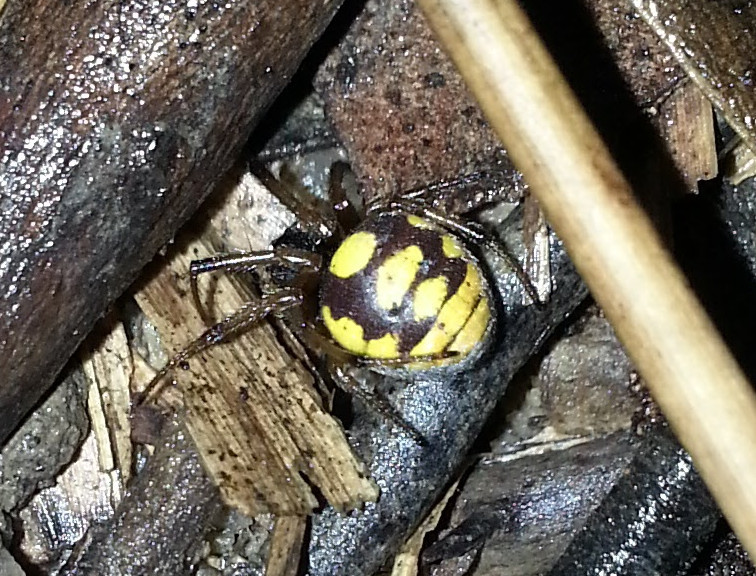
- female from Hong Kong

Scientific classification
- Kingdom: Animalia
- Phylum: Arthropoda
- Subphylum: Chelicerata
- Class: Arachnida
- Order: Araneae
- Infraorder: Araneomorphae
- Family: Araneidae
- Genus: Songaraneus
- Species: S. ejusmodi

Binomial name
- Songaraneus ejusmodi (Bösenberg & Strand, 1906)

Synonyms
- Araneus ejusmodi Bösenberg & Strand, 1906; Lithyphantes dubius Dönitz & Strand, 1906; Aranea lithyphantiformis Kishida, 1910; Agalenatea ejusmodi (Yaginuma & Archer, 1959); Araneus pachygnathoides Schenkel, 1963; Araneus qianshan Zhu, Zhang & Gao, 1998

= Songaraneus ejusmodi =

Species of spider

Songaraneus ejusmodi is a species of spider in the family Araneidae (orb weavers). Originally described in 1906 as Araneus ejusmodi, it was transferred to the newly established genus Songaraneus in 2024. The species is distributed across East Asia, including China, Korea, and Japan.

The species name ejusmodi is Latin, meaning "of this sort" or "of such kind".

== Taxonomy ==
The species was first described by Bösenberg and Strand in 1906 as Araneus ejusmodi based on specimens from Japan. It has undergone several taxonomic changes throughout its history, having been placed in the genera Agalenatea and back to Araneus before its recent transfer.

In 2024, Mi, Wang, and Li established the new genus Songaraneus and transferred this species from Araneus, creating the new combination Songaraneus ejusmodi. The transfer was based on morphological characteristics including the elliptical opisthosoma with pale markings, distally spiralled embolus, and posteriorly situated copulatory openings that distinguish it from typical Araneus species.

== Distribution ==
S. ejusmodi has been recorded from multiple locations across East Asia. It is found in China, Korea, and Japan. In China, the species has been documented from various provinces. It was historically collected from locations including Saga, Kompira, and the Yunohama mountains near Yokohama.

== Description ==
Songaraneus ejusmodi is a small to medium-sized orb weaver spider. The species exhibits sexual dimorphism typical of many araneid spiders.

=== Female ===
The female has a large, robust cephalothorax that is somewhat plump in form, reminiscent of Amaurobius. The large, highly arched head region is sharply separated from the thoracic region. The anterior median eyes are protruding and somewhat larger than the posterior eyes, positioned twice as far from the lateral eyes as they are from each other. The posterior median eyes are separated by half their diameter, positioned at their full diameter from the anterior median eyes but at least five times their diameter from the lateral eyes. The lateral eyes touch each other, are equal in size, and are positioned on a small protruding tubercle.

The coloration of the entire cephalothorax is dark brown, as is the shield-shaped sternum that extends somewhat below the lip region, along with the chelicerae, maxillae, and lip region. The latter two have broad, light brown margins. On the pedipalps, the first three segments are yellowish, while the last two are yellow-brown.

The legs are not particularly long but fairly robust, with a light brown base color. Legs I and II have dark brown rings at the ends of the femora and tibiae, while on legs III the patellae and tibiae are narrowly dark at the ends, with broad end tarsi. Leg IV has dark brown rings on the femora, patellae, tibiae, and tarsi.

The opisthosoma is elongated and oval, nearly as broad as long in egg-bearing females. The dorsal surface has a whitish-yellow base color with an attractive dark brown median marking and border. The sides of the abdomen are light brown, with a dark velvety brown center and bright whitish-yellow hooks on each side. Several broader and narrower wedge-shaped stripes extend from the abdomen into the light brown sides. The area around the spinnerets is also dark velvety brown and surrounds the dark brown, yellow-bordered spinnerets.

=== Male ===
The male cephalothorax has the same form and coloration as the female, but the thoracic groove is more pronounced while being very weak in the female. The pedipalps are light brown to dark brown on the tarsal segment. The tibial segment has a characteristic forward-directed spine process and the copulatory organs have a broad, far-extending, hollow, sharp-ending hook portion.

The legs are colored the same as in females, with spines on the first two pairs being somewhat longer and stronger, particularly under the tibiae II. The opisthosoma is long and oval, with a white base color and dark brown margins and similar markings that fade into a brown-gray coloration at the end.
