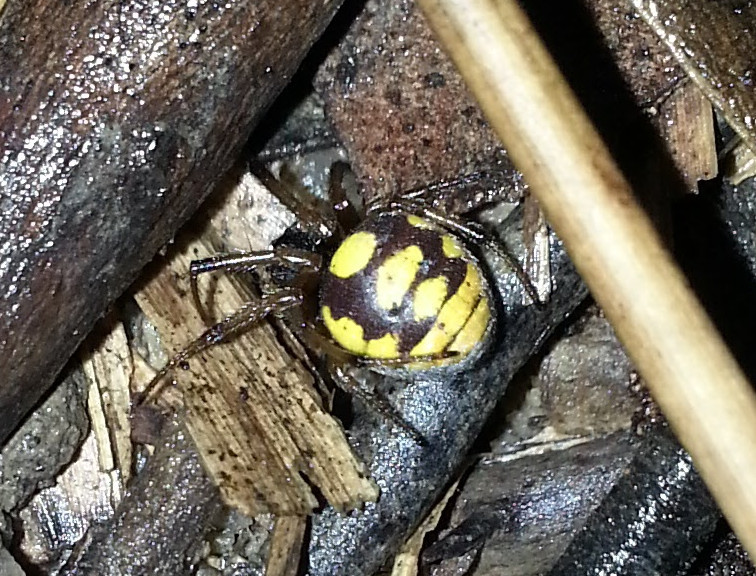
- female S. ejusmodi in Hong Kong
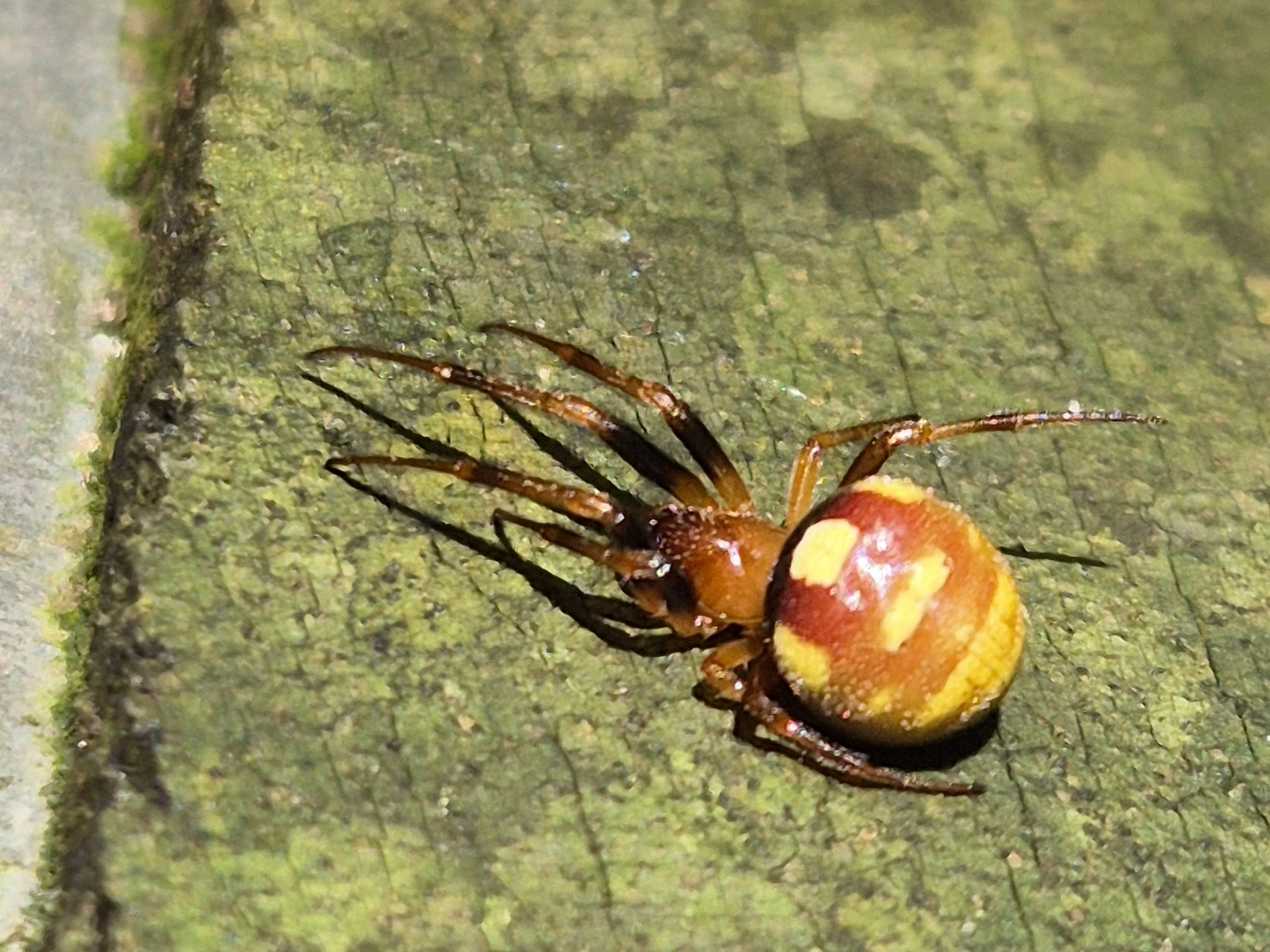
- female S. perpolitus in Singapore

Scientific classification
- Kingdom: Animalia
- Phylum: Arthropoda
- Subphylum: Chelicerata
- Class: Arachnida
- Order: Araneae
- Infraorder: Araneomorphae
- Family: Araneidae
- Genus: Songaraneus; Mi, Wang & Li, 2024

Type species
- S. jiekou Mi, Wang & Li, 2024

Species
- 4, see text

= Songaraneus =

Genus of spiders

Songaraneus is a genus of spiders in the family Araneidae.

== Distribution ==
Three of the described species are found in China, with two described from Xishuangbanna in Yunnan province. S. ejusmodi, previously part of the genus Araneus, is found in China, Korea, and Japan. S. perpolitus, previously in genus Singa, is endemic to Singapore.

== Etymology ==
The genus name is a combination of the surname of Chinese arachnologist Da-Xiang Song (Chinese: 宋大祥; pinyin: Sòngdàxiáng) (1935–2008), and the related genus Araneus.

The newly described species were named after songs by Taiwanese singer Jay Chou, Chinese: 退後; pinyin: Tuì hòu ("back off"), and Chinese: 借口; pinyin: Jièkǒu ("excuse").

== Species ==
As of October 2025, this genus includes four species:

- Songaraneus ejusmodi (Bösenberg & Strand, 1906) – China, Korea, Japan
- Songaraneus jiekou Mi, Wang & Li, 2024 – China (type species)
- Songaraneus perpolitus (Thorell, 1893) – Singapore
- Songaraneus tuihou Mi, Wang & Li, 2024 – China
