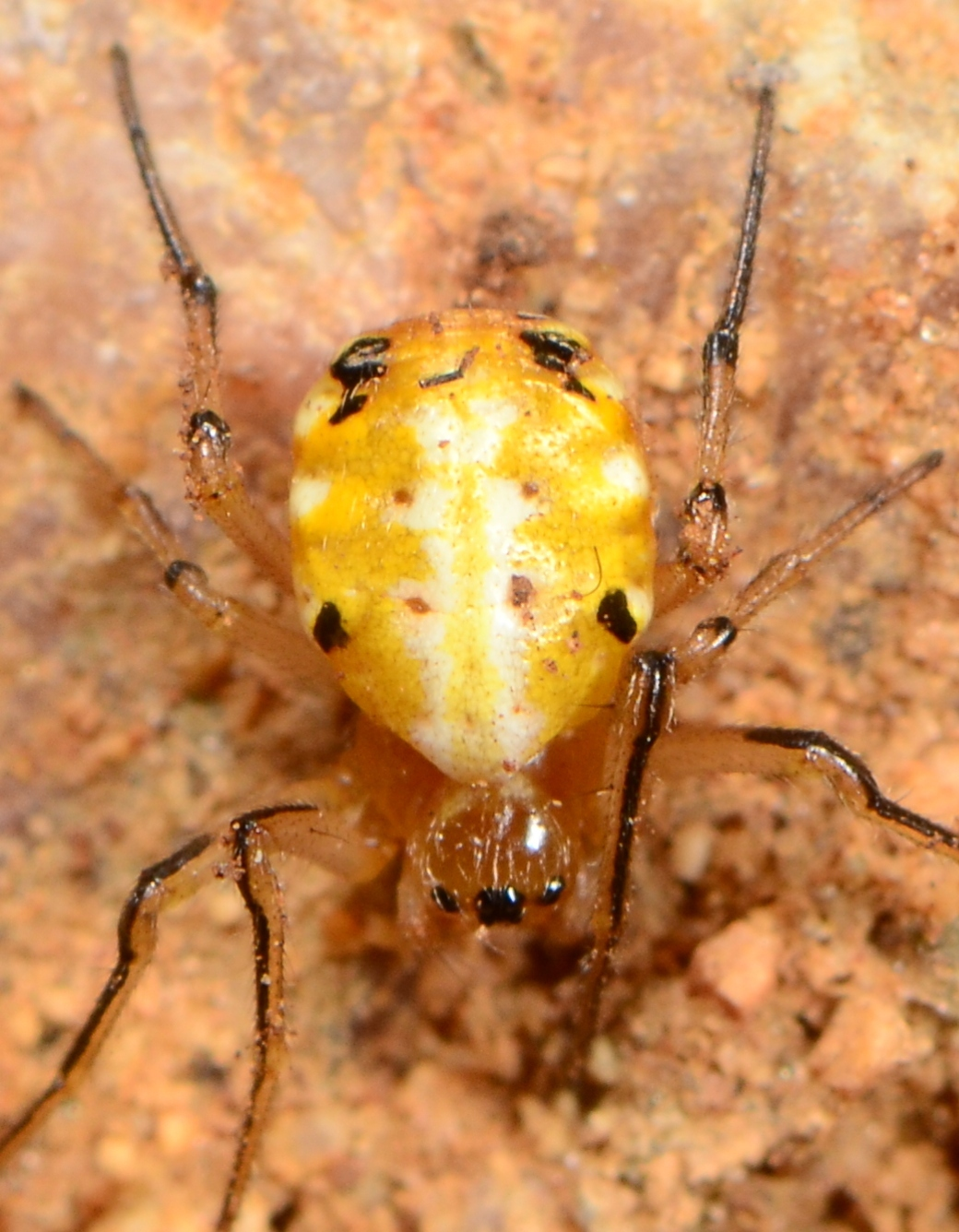
- female from South Africa
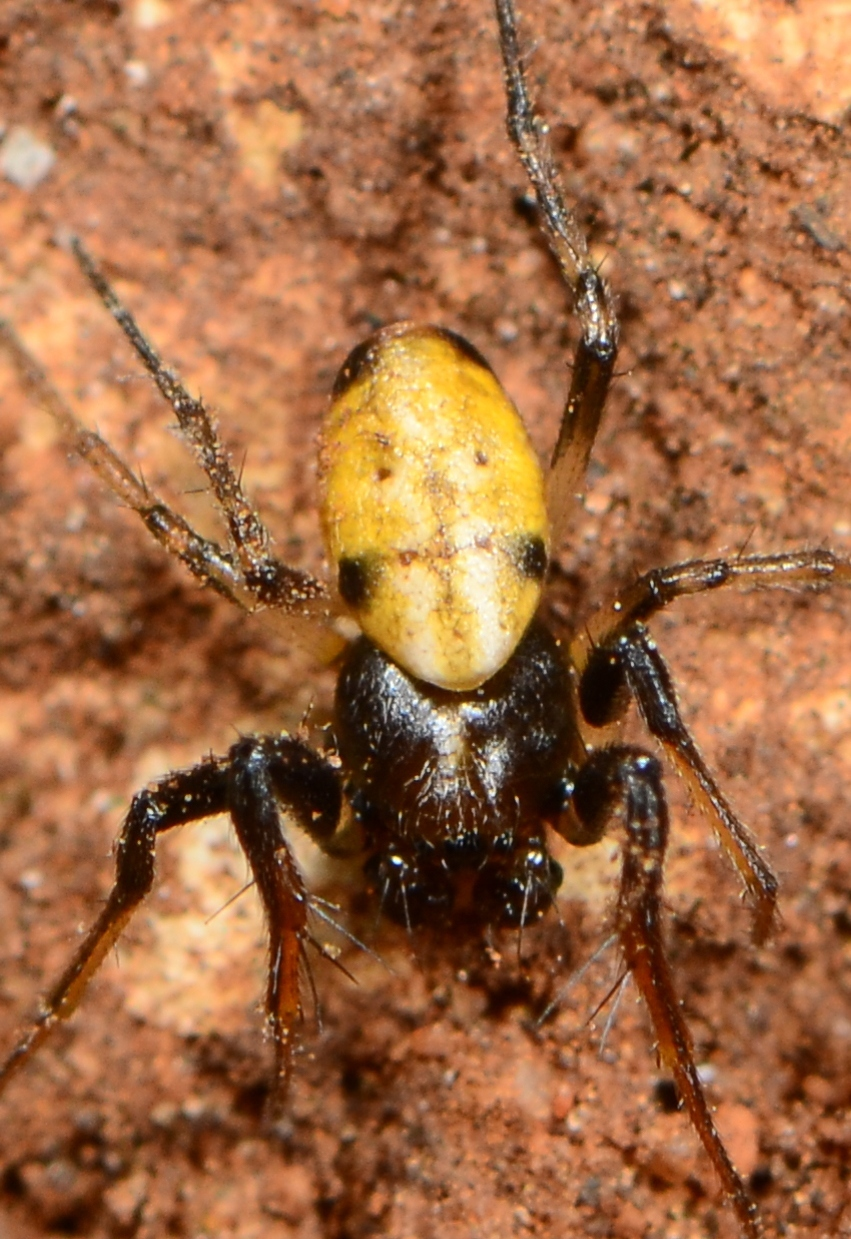
- male from South Africa

Scientific classification
- Kingdom: Animalia
- Phylum: Arthropoda
- Subphylum: Chelicerata
- Class: Arachnida
- Order: Araneae
- Infraorder: Araneomorphae
- Family: Araneidae
- Genus: Hypsosinga
- Species: H. pygmaea

Binomial name
- Hypsosinga pygmaea (Sundevall, 1831)

Synonyms
- H. pygmaea synonyms: Theridion pygmaeum Sundevall, 1831; Micryphantes anthracinus C. L. Koch, 1837; Phrurolithus trifasciatus C. L. Koch, 1839; Singa trifasciata C. L. Koch, 1844; Singa anthracina C. L. Koch, 1844; Epeira nigrifrons Westring, 1851; Epeira trifasciata Westring, 1851; Singa abbreviata Karsch, 1873; Singa aenea Kroneberg, 1875; Singa maculata Thorell, 1875; Singa variabilis Emerton, 1884; Singa grammica Simon, 1885; Microneta distincta Banks, 1892; Singa cubana Banks, 1909; Pronous laevisternis Simon, 1909; Linyphia banksi Petrunkevitch, 1911; Araneus varians Petrunkevitch, 1911; Singa quadripunctata Kishida, 1931; Singa melania Chamberlin & Ivie, 1947; Araneus itemvarians Bonnet, 1955; Aranea linyphiformis Bösenberg & Strand, 1906; Aranea theridiformis Bösenberg & Strand, 1906; Linyphia bicolor Banks, 1906

= Hypsosinga pygmaea =

Spotted False Pajama Spider

Species of spider

Hypsosinga pygmaea is a species of orb weaver in the spider family Araneidae, found in North America, Eurasia and southern Africa. It is commonly known as the spotted false pajama spider.

== Distribution ==
Hypsosinga pygmaea is widespread and known from North America, Europe, Turkey, Israel, Caucasus, Russia to Central Asia, China, Korea, Japan and South Africa.

In South Africa, the species is known from four provinces across a moderate range at altitudes from 47 to 1,471 m above sea level. The South African distribution includes Mpumalanga, Gauteng, and KwaZulu-Natal provinces. Notable localities include Loskop Dam Nature Reserve, Nelspruit, Irene, Ezemvelo Nature Reserve, Roodeplaatdam Nature Reserve, and Ndumo Game Reserve.

== Habitat and ecology ==
Hypsosinga pygmaea constructs a complete orb-web probably sometimes with a retreat. The species is sampled mainly by sweep-netting grasses and herbs from the Grassland and Savanna biomes.

== Description ==
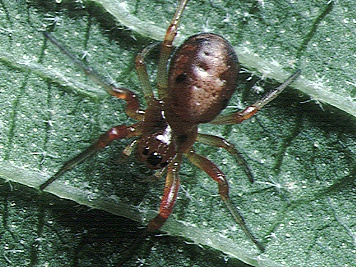
female from Japan

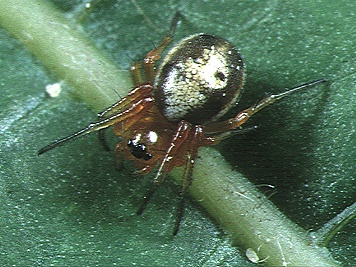
female from Japan

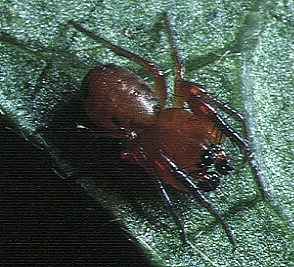
male from Japan

== Conservation ==
Hypsosinga pygmaea is listed as Least Concern by the South African National Biodiversity Institute due to its wide global range. The species is protected in several reserves including Loskop Dam Nature Reserve, Ezemvelo Nature Reserve, Roodeplaatdam Nature Reserve, Ndumo Game Reserve, and Blouberg Nature Reserve. No conservation actions are recommended.

== Taxonomy ==
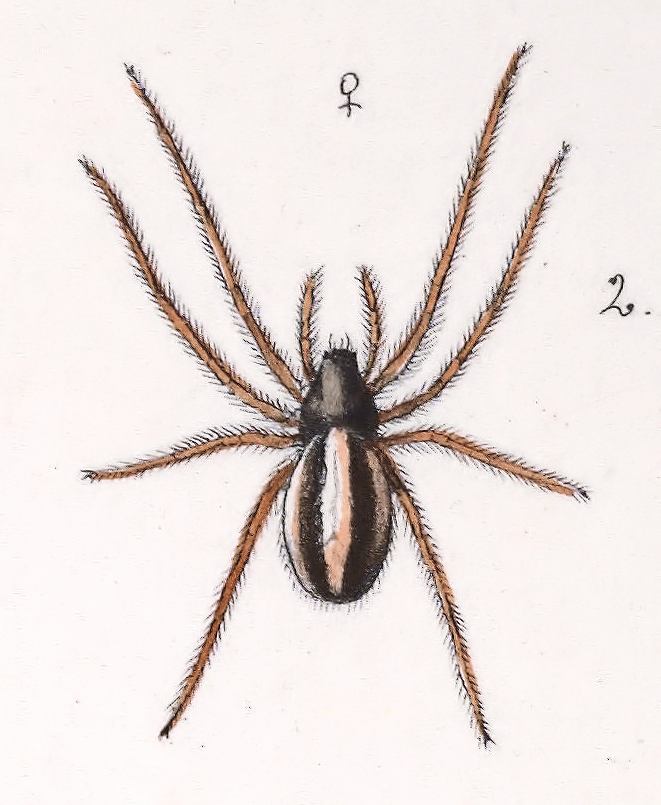
female (Becker, 1882)

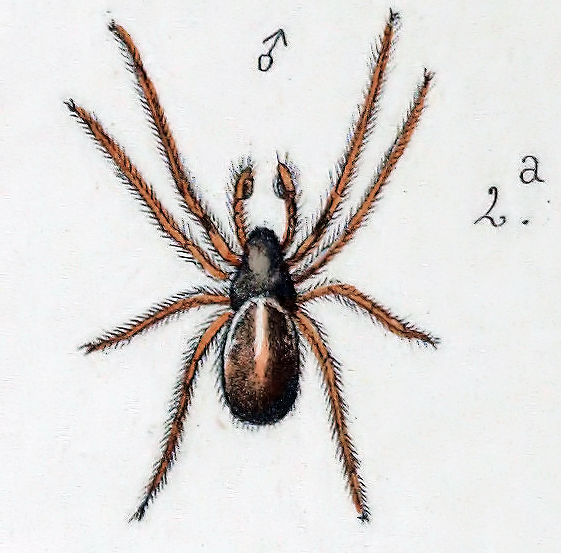
male (Becker, 1882)

The species is known from both sexes.

== Subspecies ==
These three subspecies belong to the species Hypsosinga pygmaea:

- H. p. pygmaea (Sundevall, 1831)
- H. p. nigra (Simon, 1909)
- H. p. nigriceps (Kulczynski, 1903)
