= Hypsosinga funebris =

Scientific classification
- Domain: Eukaryota
- Kingdom: Animalia
- Phylum: Arthropoda
- Subphylum: Chelicerata
- Class: Arachnida
- Order: Araneae
- Infraorder: Araneomorphae
- Family: Araneidae
- Genus: Hypsosinga
- Species: H. funebris

Binomial name
- Hypsosinga funebris (Keyserling, 1892)

Species of spider

Hypsosinga funebris is a species of orb weaver in the spider family Araneidae. It is found in the United States and Canada.
