= Hypsosinga taprobanica =

Scientific classification
- Kingdom: Animalia
- Phylum: Arthropoda
- Subphylum: Chelicerata
- Class: Arachnida
- Order: Araneae
- Infraorder: Araneomorphae
- Family: Araneidae
- Genus: Hypsosinga
- Species: H. taprobanica

Binomial name
- Hypsosinga taprobanica (Simon, 1895)

Synonyms
- Pronous taprobanicus Simon, 1895

Species of spider

Hypsosinga taprobanica, is a species of spider of the genus Hypsosinga. It is endemic to Sri Lanka.
