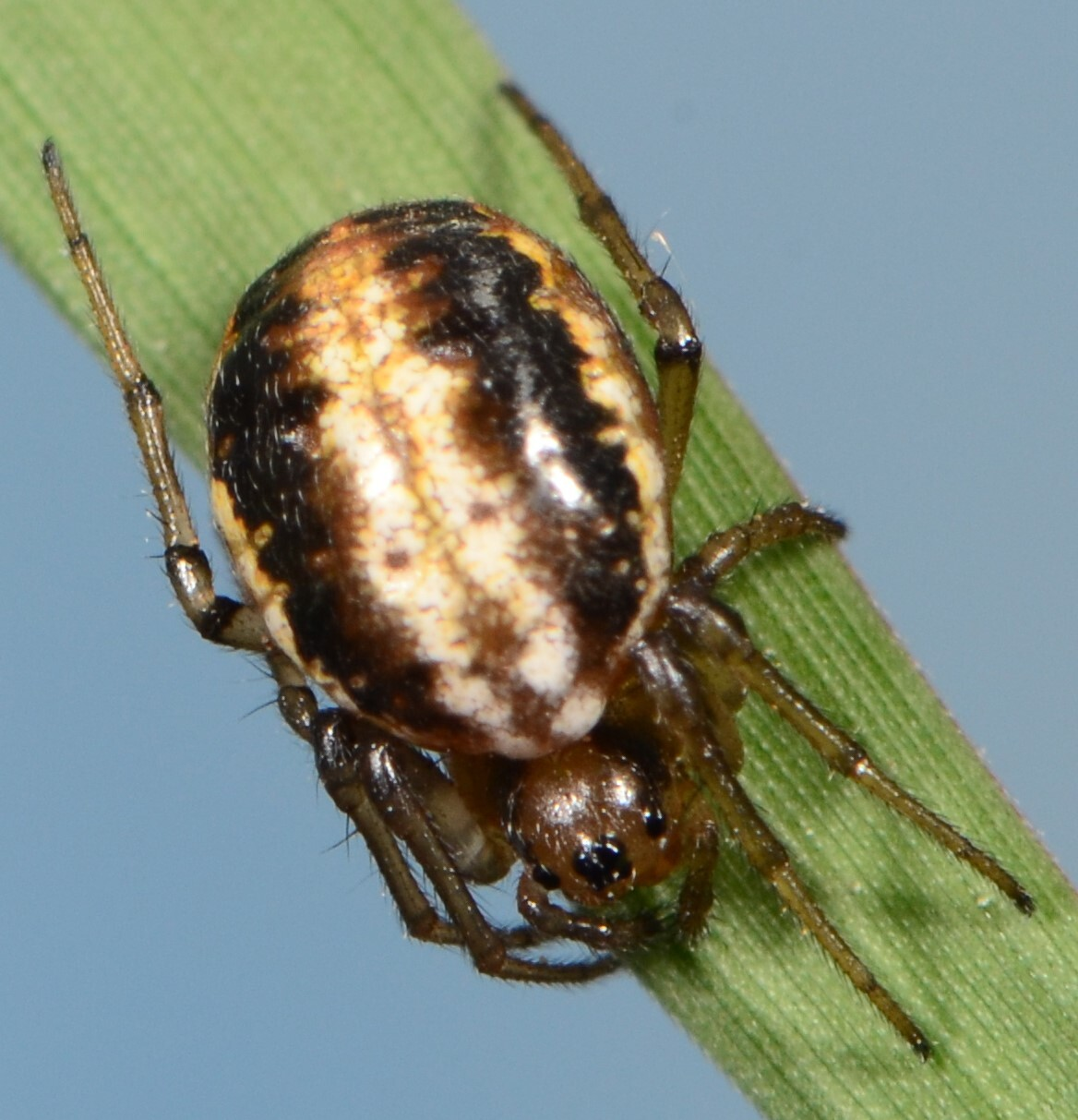
- female
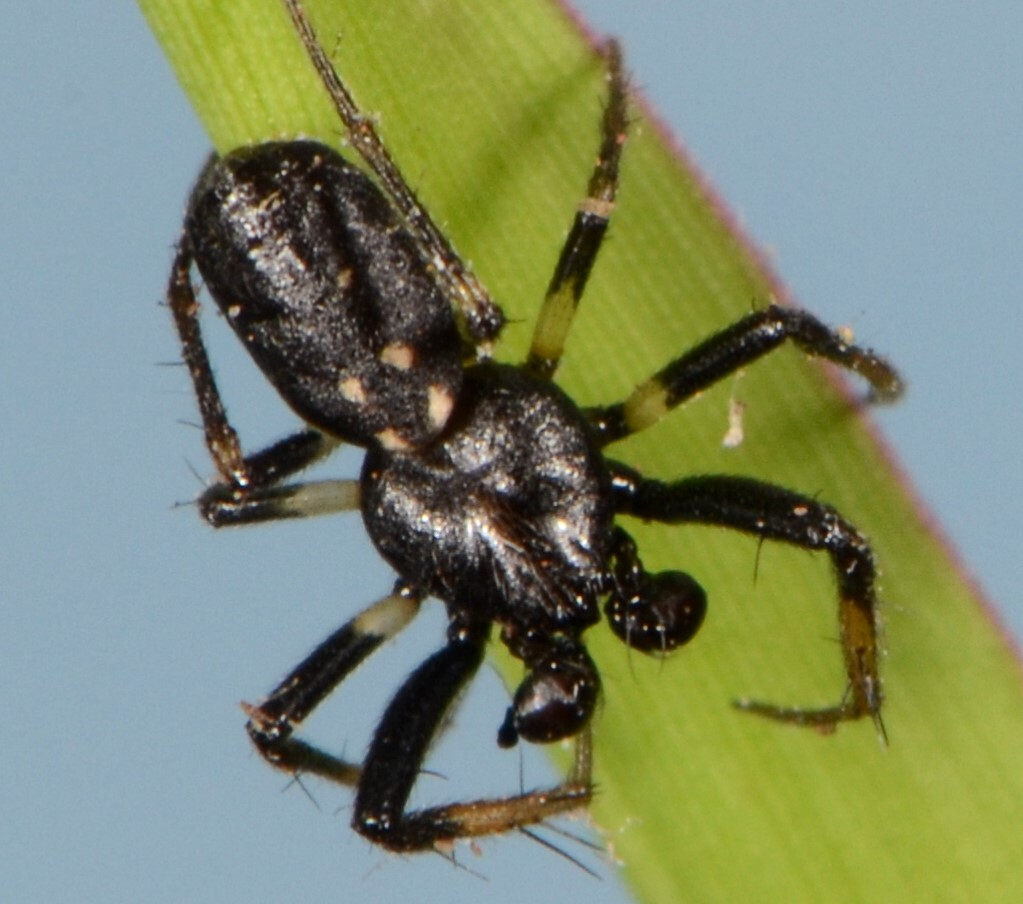
- male

Scientific classification
- Kingdom: Animalia
- Phylum: Arthropoda
- Subphylum: Chelicerata
- Class: Arachnida
- Order: Araneae
- Infraorder: Araneomorphae
- Family: Araneidae
- Genus: Hypsosinga
- Species: H. lithyphantoides

Binomial name
- Hypsosinga lithyphantoides Caporiacco, 1947

Synonyms
- Hyposinga lithyphantoides Caporiacco, 1947

= Hypsosinga lithyphantoides =

False Pyjama Spider

Species of spider

Hypsosinga lithyphantoides is a species of spider in the family Araneidae,found from Uganda to South Africa. It is commonly known as the false pyjama spider.

== Distribution ==
Hypsosinga lithyphantoides is known from Kenya, Uganda and South Africa.

The South African distribution includes Eastern Cape, Free State, KwaZulu-Natal, Limpopo, and Mpumalanga provinces. Notable localities include Mkhambathi Nature Reserve, Amanzi Private Game Reserve, Bloemfontein Free State National Botanical Garden, iSimangaliso Wetland park, Ndumo Game Reserve, Blouberg Nature Reserve, and Kruger National Park.

== Habitat and ecology ==
Hypsosinga lithyphantoides constructs a complete orb-web sometimes with a retreat. The species is sampled mainly by sweep-netting grasses and herbs from the Grassland, Indian Ocean Coastal Belt and Savanna biomes at altitudes from 1 to 1,593 m above sea level. The species has also been recorded from citrus orchards and potato fields.

== Description ==
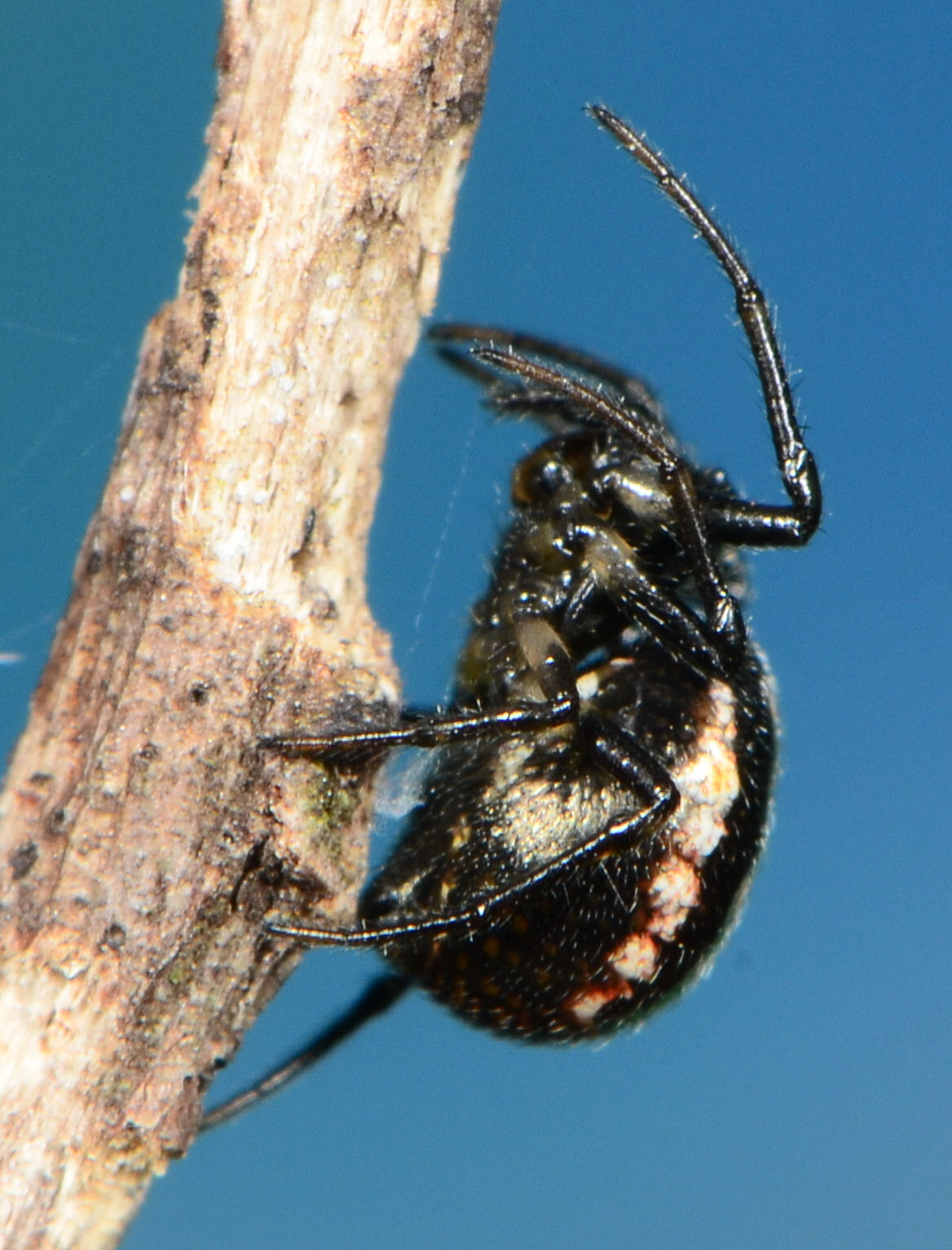
female

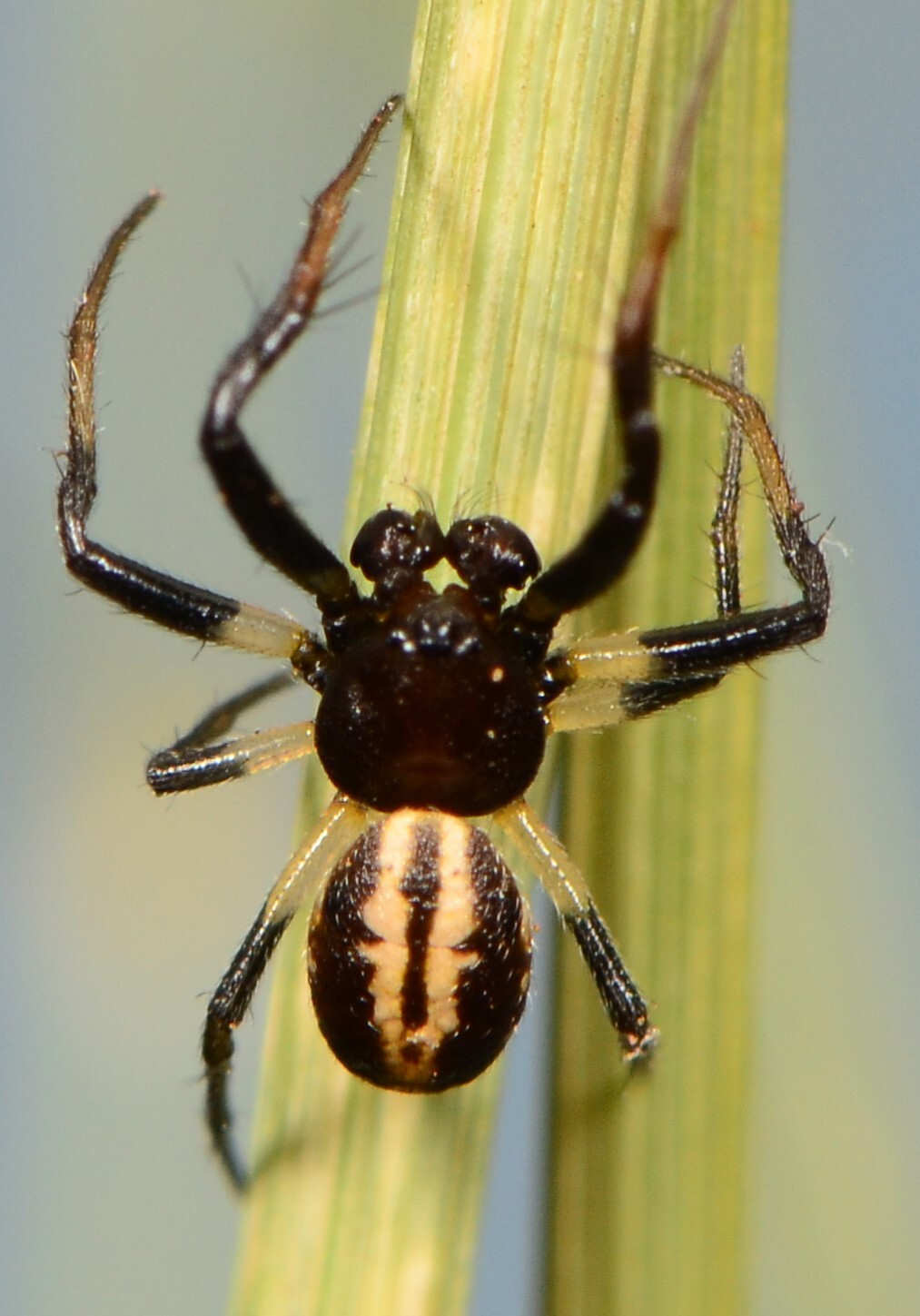
male

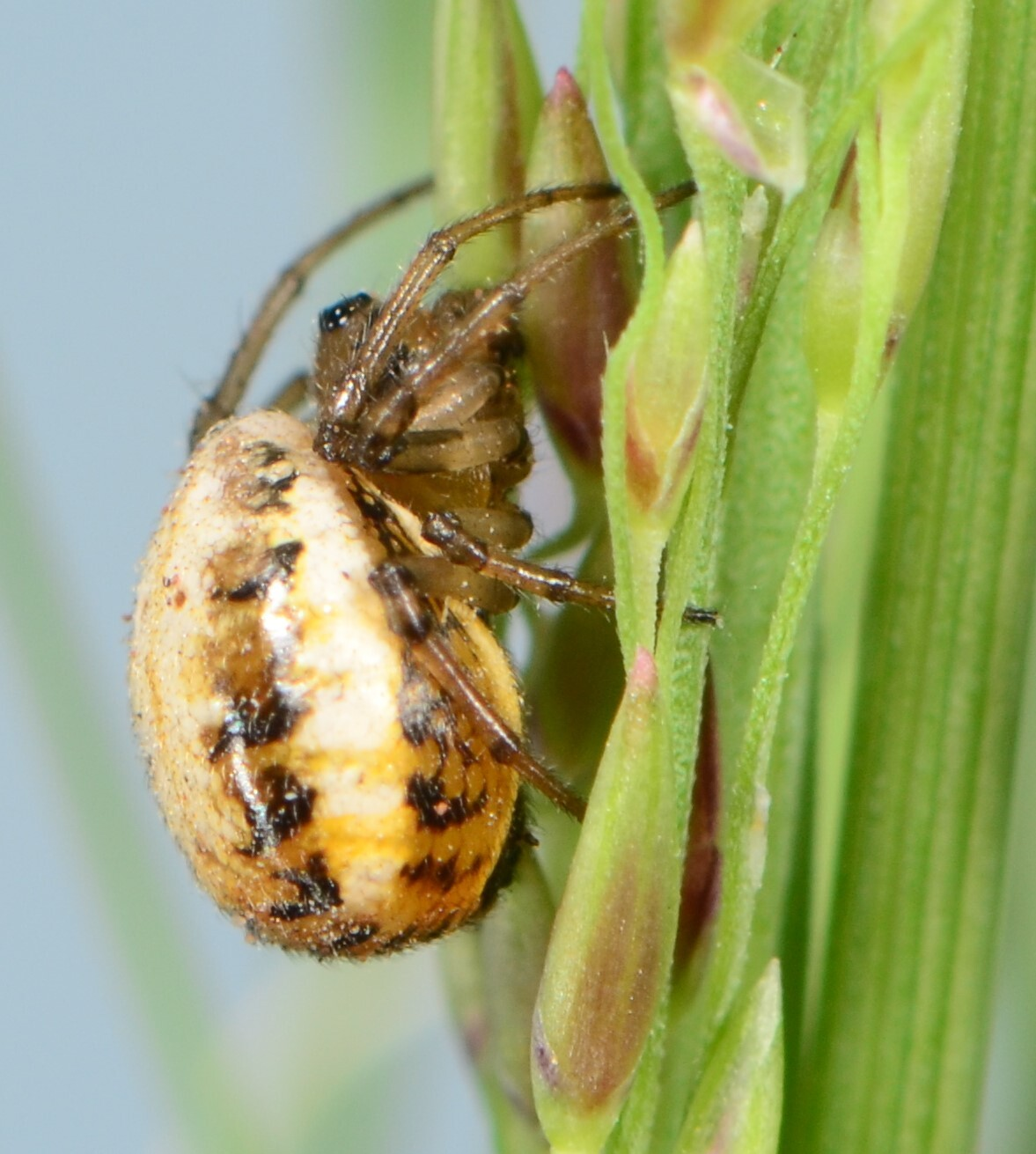
juvenile

== Conservation ==
Hypsosinga lithyphantoides is listed as Least Concern by the South African National Biodiversity Institute because of its wide geographical range. No conservation actions are recommended. The species is protected in more than 15 protected areas including Mkhambathi Nature Reserve, Amanzi Private Game Reserve, Erfenis Dam Nature Reserve, Ndumo Game Reserve, and Blouberg Nature Reserve.

== Taxonomy ==
H. lithyphantoides is known from both sexes.
