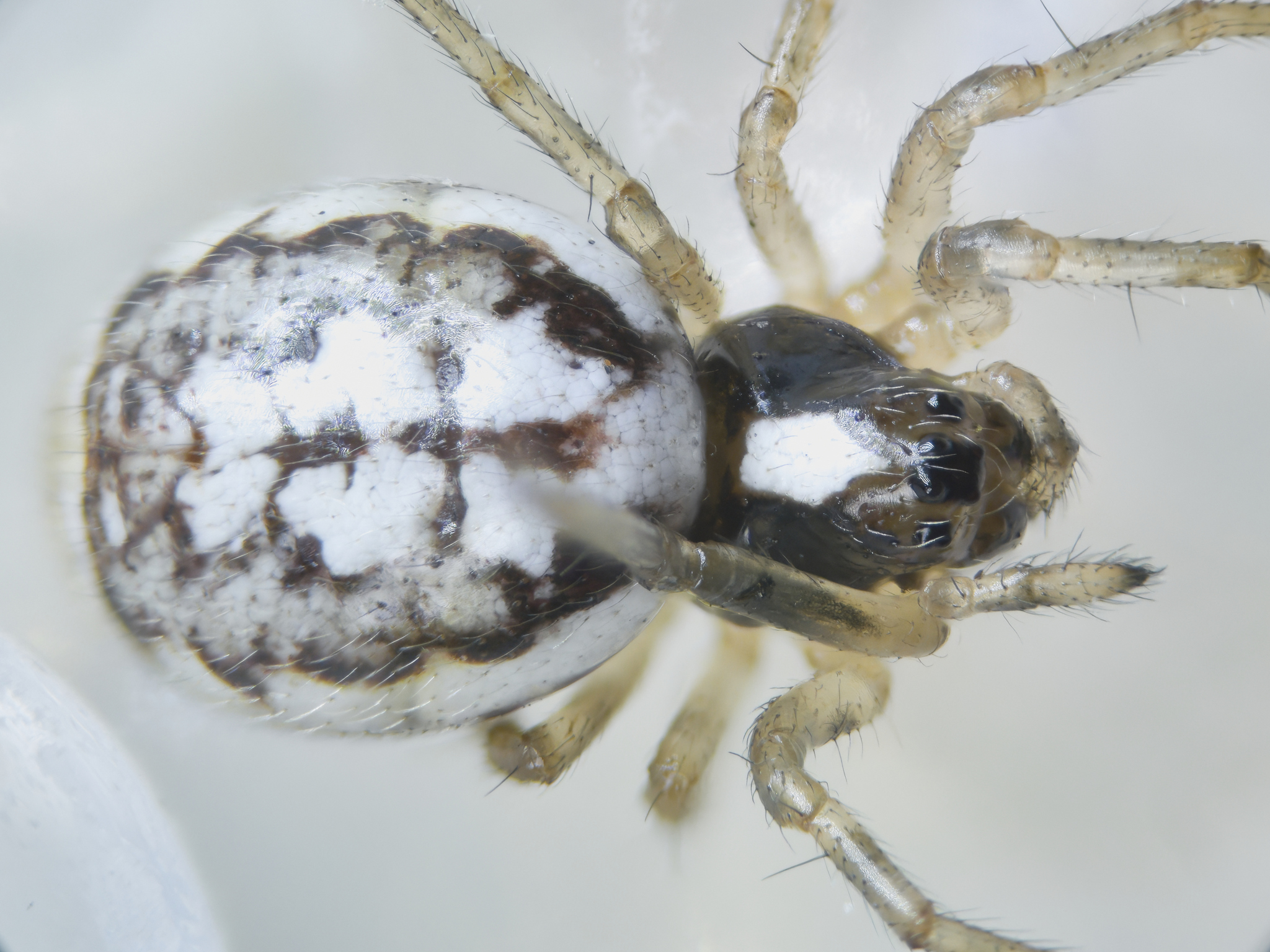

Scientific classification
- Kingdom: Animalia
- Phylum: Arthropoda
- Subphylum: Chelicerata
- Class: Arachnida
- Order: Araneae
- Infraorder: Araneomorphae
- Family: Araneidae
- Genus: Hypsosinga
- Species: H. albovittata

Binomial name
- Hypsosinga albovittata (Westring, 1851)

= Hypsosinga albovittata =

Species of spider

Hypsosinga albovittata is an orb-weaver spider species (family Araneidae), found in the Palearctic.
