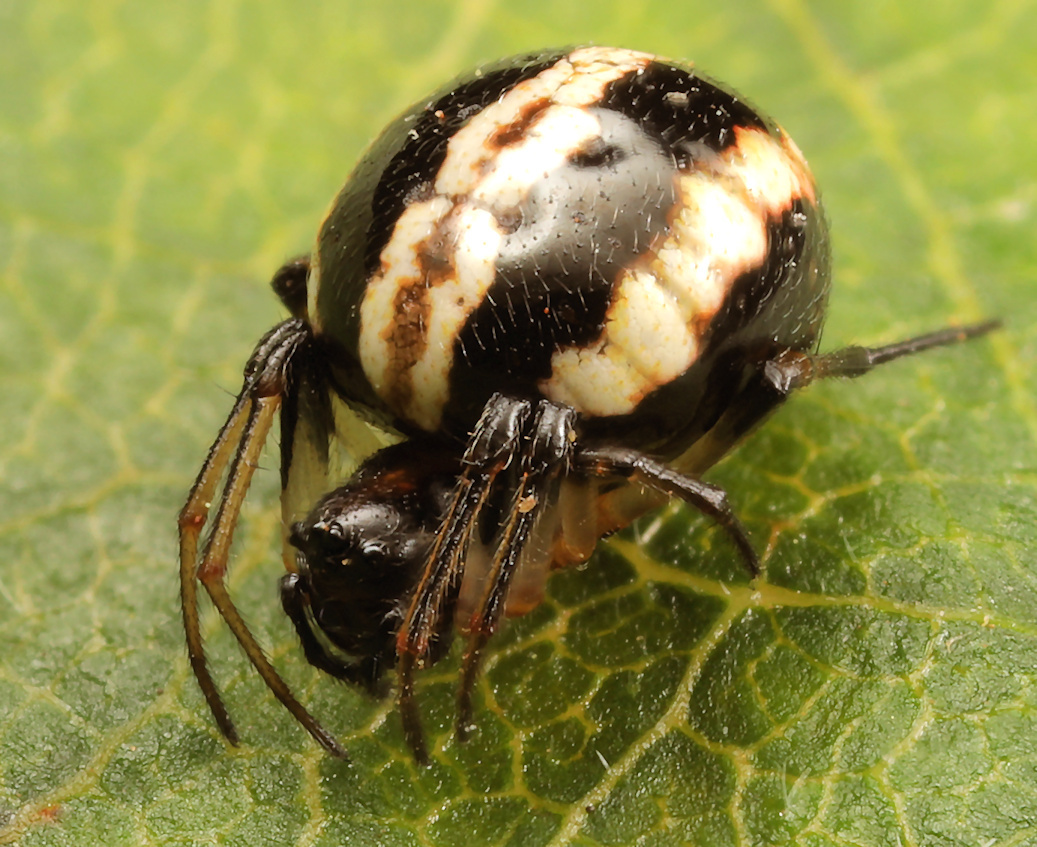

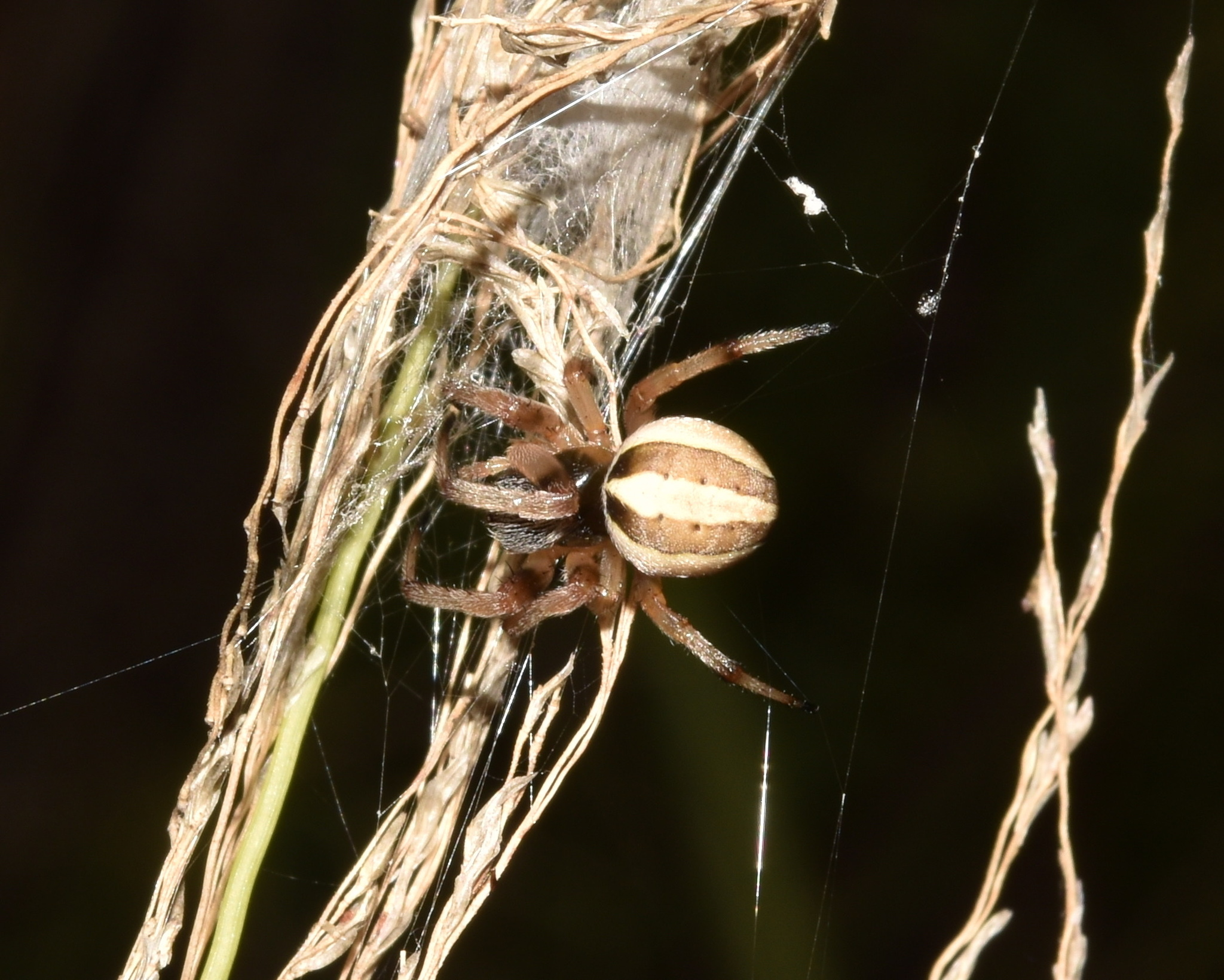

Scientific classification
- Kingdom: Animalia
- Phylum: Arthropoda
- Subphylum: Chelicerata
- Class: Arachnida
- Order: Araneae
- Infraorder: Araneomorphae
- Family: Araneidae
- Genus: Singa
- Species: S. albodorsata

Binomial name
- Singa albodorsata Kauri, 1950

= Singa albodorsata =

Species of spider

Singa albodorsata is a southern African species of spider in the family Araneidae.

== Distribution ==
Singa albodorsata occurs in Eswatini, Lesotho, and South Africa. In South Africa, it has been recorded from Eastern Cape, KwaZulu-Natal, Limpopo, and Mpumalanga.

== Habitat and ecology ==
The species inhabits altitudes ranging from 1 to 2,185 m above sea level and has been sampled from the Grassland and Savanna biomes. Singa albodorsata constructs small orb webs in low growing vegetation, herbs and grasses.

== Description ==
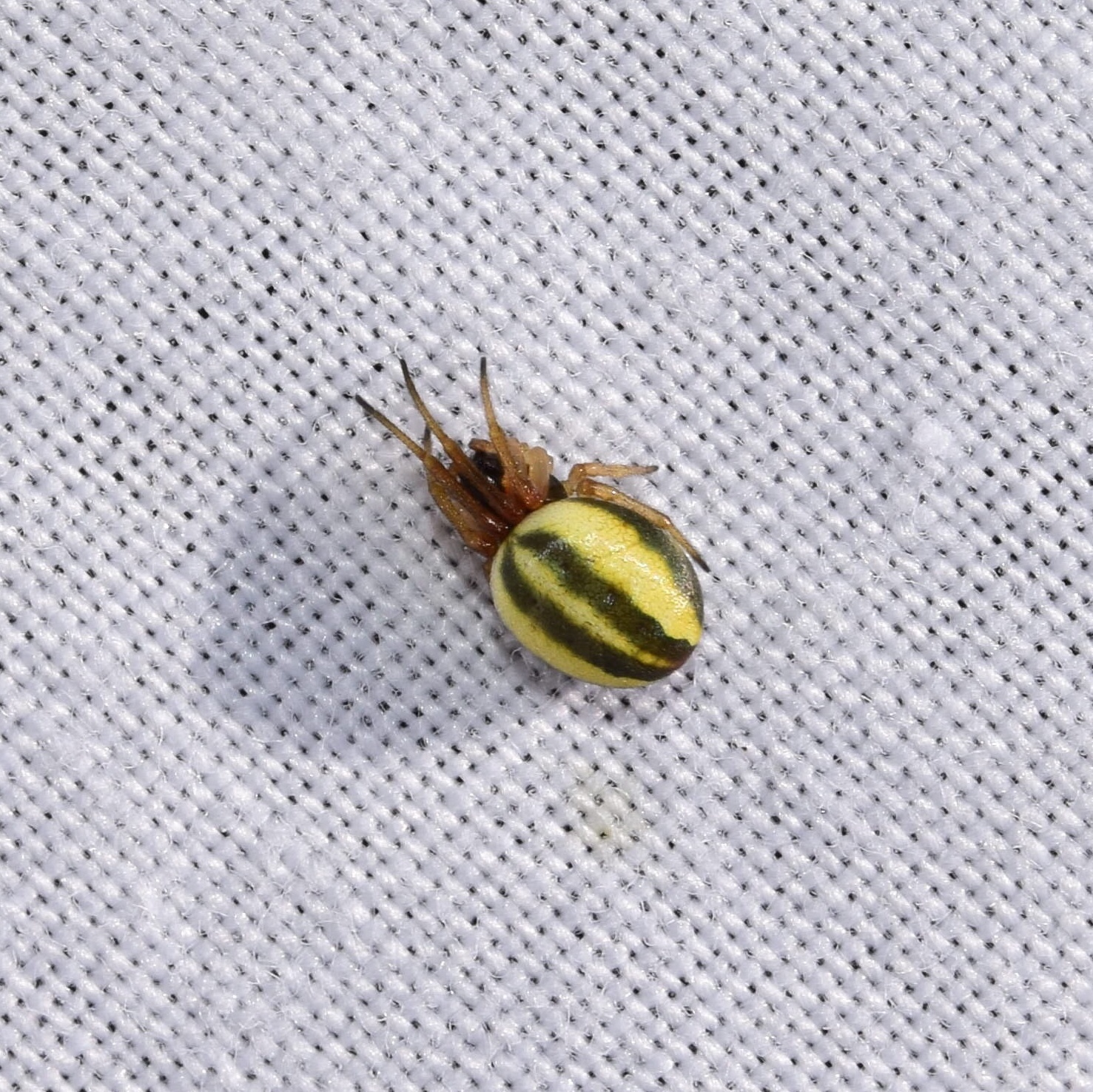

== Conservation ==
Singa albodorsata is listed as Least Concern by the South African National Biodiversity Institute. The species is protected in seven protected areas including Mkambati Nature Reserve and Kruger National Park.

== Etymology ==
The specific name albodorsata is Latin for "white back".

== Taxonomy ==
S. albodorsata was originally described by Kauri in 1950 from the Kruger National Park, Mpumalanga. It is known only from females.
