= Agalenatea redii =

- Agalenatea redii

Scientific classification
- Kingdom: Animalia
- Phylum: Arthropoda
- Subphylum: Chelicerata
- Class: Arachnida
- Order: Araneae
- Infraorder: Araneomorphae
- Family: Araneidae
- Genus: Agalenatea
- Species: A. redii

Binomial name
- Agalenatea redii (Scopoli, 1763)

Synonyms
- List: Aranea redi Scopoli, 1763; Aranea aldrovandi Scopoli, 1763; Aranea cratera Walckenaer, 1802; Epeira crater (Walckenaer, 1802); Epeira solers Walckenaer, 1805; Epeira agalena Hahn, 1834; Atea sclopetaria C. L. Koch, 1844; Anetes caeletron Menge, 1850; Epeira sollers Westring, 1861; Epeira biocellata Canestrini, 1868; Epeira redii (Scopoli, 1763); Araneus redi (Scopoli, 1763)

Species of spider

Agalenatea redii is a species of 'orbweavers' belonging to the family Araneidae subfamily Araneinae.

== Description ==
The adult males of these spiders reach 4.6–6.2 millimetres (0.18–0.24 in) of length, while females are 6.5–10.3 millimetres (0.26–0.41 in) long. The coloration of the body is very variable. The basic color varies from light or dark brown to yellowish-orange. They usually show a dark longitudinal band in the middle of the abdomen, with some trasversal bands. Sometimes the opisthosoma has two large white spots or one dark brown light-edged spot on the back. Chelicerae and legs are brown. The whole body is densely hairy, especially in the anterior body section (prosoma). The thorax is relatively broad, pear-shaped. The abdomen (opisthosoma) is quite flat and wider than long.

== Biology ==
This species of 'orbweavers' has one generation a year (univoltine). Adults are thermophilic. They are active very early and can already be encountered from April. Spawning occurs in early summer. Adult males are found until June, while females, still abundant in July, begin to disappear around August. Each female lays from 70 to 130 eggs. The newborns are already sub-adults by the beginning of winter. They overwinter, only to become adults in the next spring.

== Distribution and habitat ==
This species is present in most of Europe, Turkey, Caucasus, Russia (Europe to South Siberia), Iran, Central Asia and China. These 'orbweavers' prefer open habitats, like sandy and arid grasslands, dry shrubs and bushes, sunny edges of woods, warm steppes, etc.

== Gallery ==
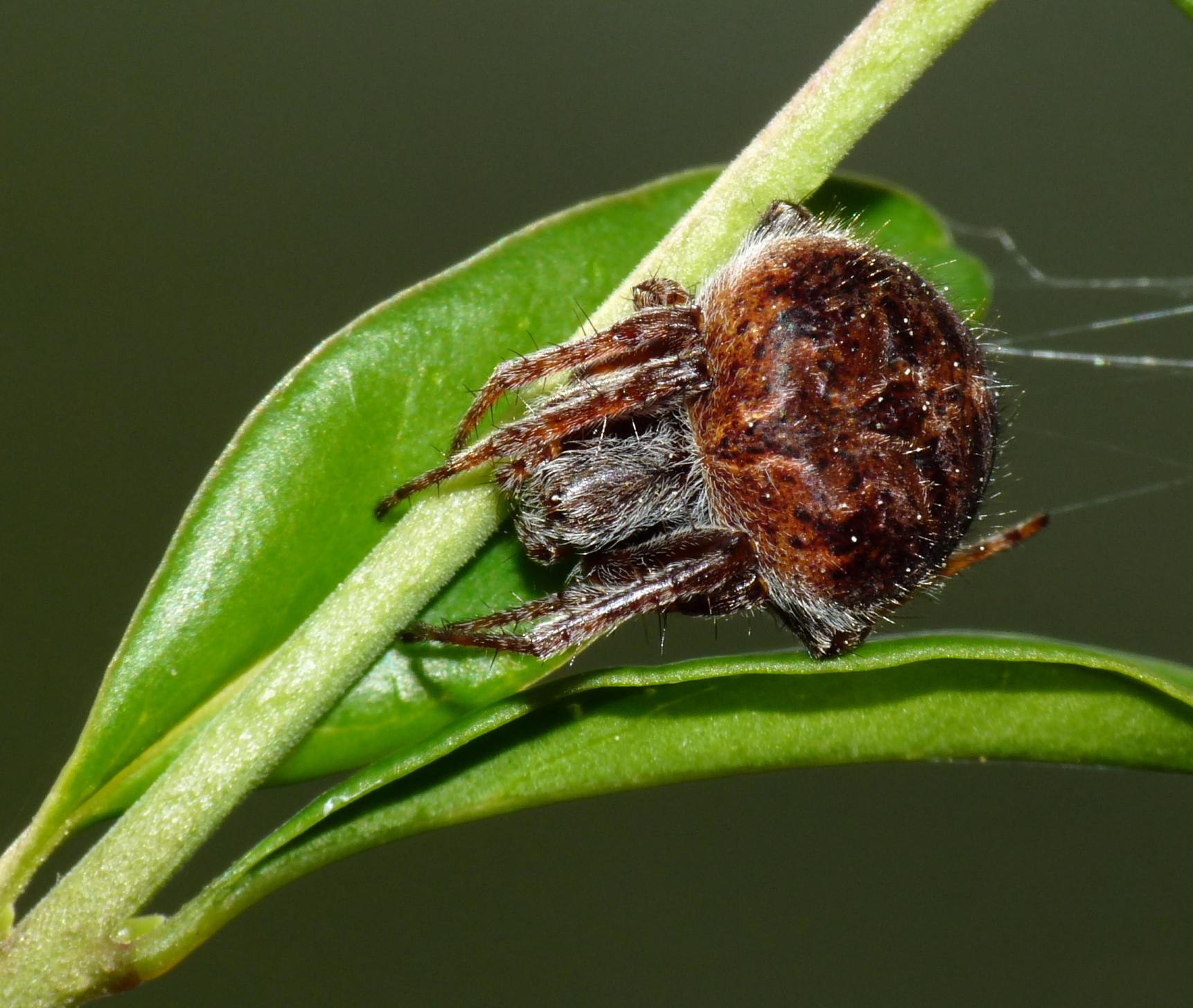
Agalenatea redii, Female

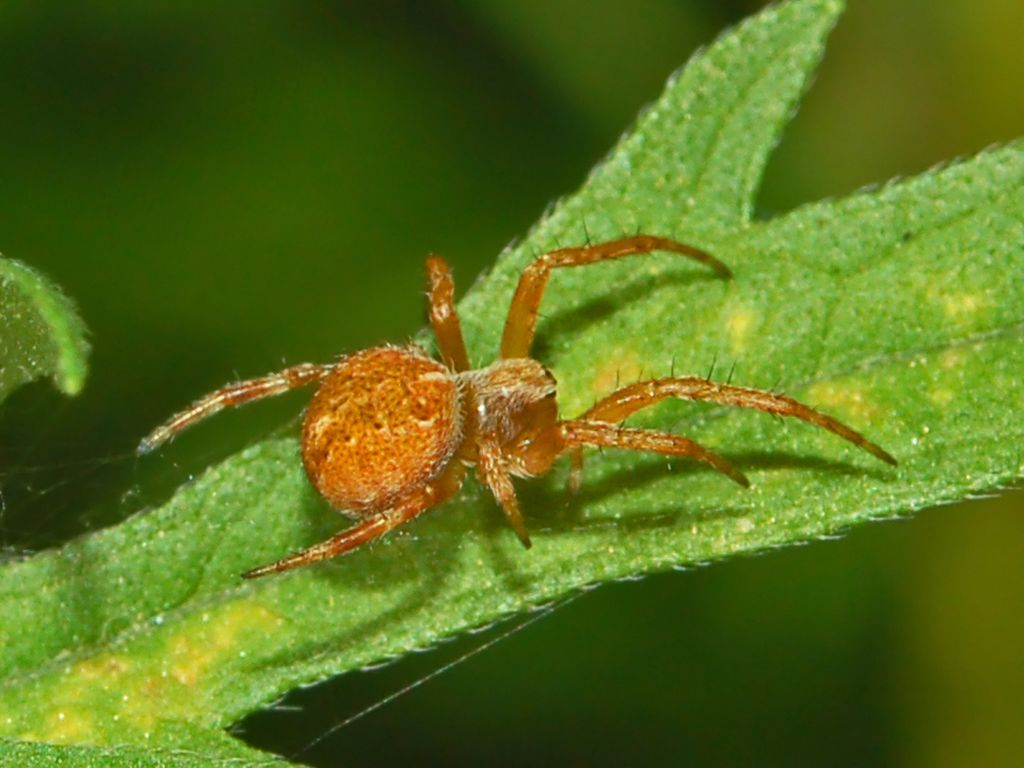
A. redii from Piedmont, Italy

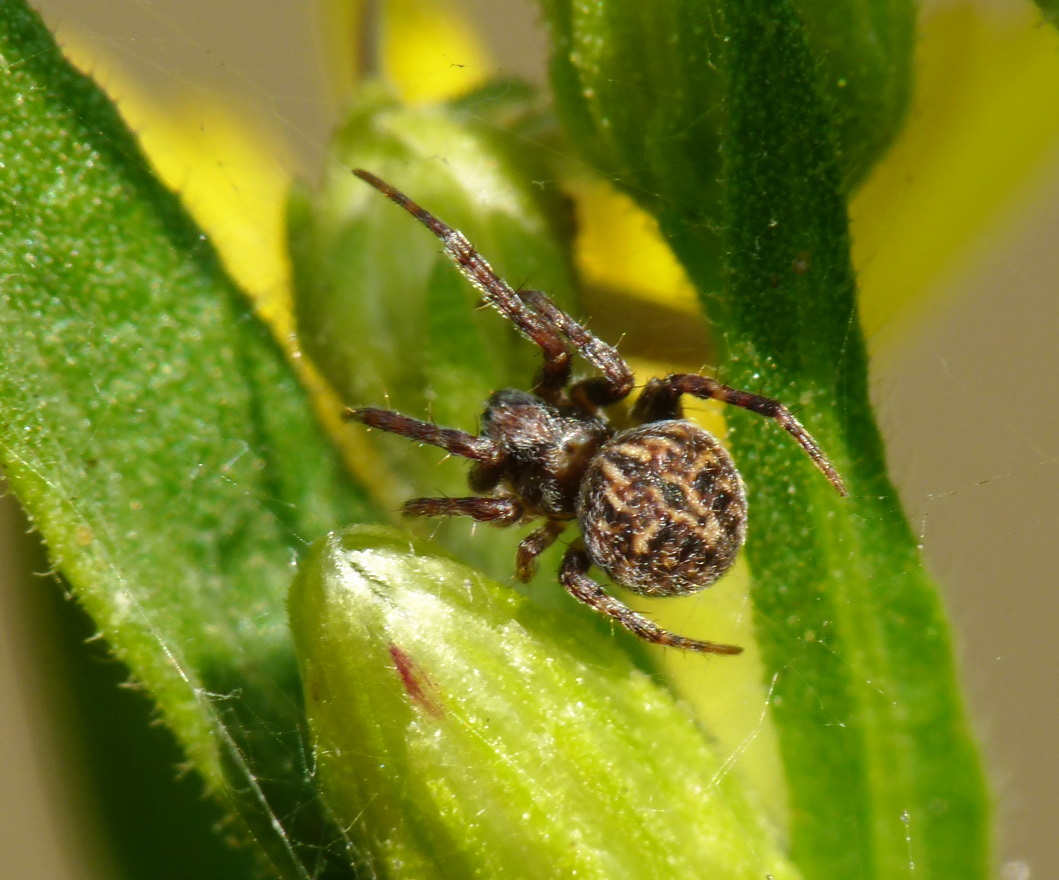
A. redii from Tuscany, Italy

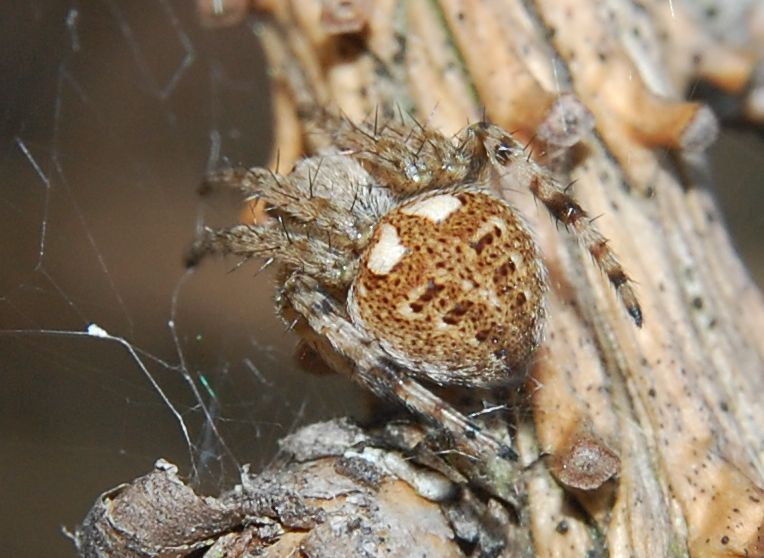
A. redii, Female, from Berlin, Germany

== Bibliography ==
- Scopoli, J. A. (1763) Entomologia carniolica, exhibens insecta carniolae indigena et distributa in ordines, genera, species, varietates. Methodo Linnaeana., Vindobonae, 420 pp. (Araneae, pp. 392–404).
- Buchar J. & Růžička V. (2002): Catalogue of spiders of the Czech Republic. Peres, Praha.
- Locket G H, Millidge A F (1953) British spiders. Vol. II. Ray Society, London, 449 pp
- Otto S (2020) Caucasian spiders. A faunistic database on the spiders of the Caucasus Ecoregion
- Roberts M J (1995) Collins Field Guide: Spiders of Britain & Northern Europe. HarperCollins, London, 383 p
- Roberts, M.J., 1985c, Atypidae to Theridiosomatidae, Harley Books,
- van Helsdingen, P.J.. 1996, A county distribution of Irish spiders, incorporating a revised catalogue of the species, Irish Naturalists' Journal, 1-92
