= Singa lawrencei =

Lawrence's Pyjama Spider

Conservation status
- Least Concern (SANBI Red List)

Scientific classification
- Kingdom: Animalia
- Phylum: Arthropoda
- Subphylum: Chelicerata
- Class: Arachnida
- Order: Araneae
- Infraorder: Araneomorphae
- Family: Araneidae
- Genus: Singa
- Species: S. lawrencei

Binomial name
- Singa lawrencei (Lessert, 1930)

Synonyms
- Araneus (S.) lawrencei Lessert, 1930

Species of spider

Singa lawrencei is a species of spider in the family Araneidae. It is an African endemic commonly known as Lawrence's pyjama spider.

== Distribution ==
Singa lawrencei occurs in the Democratic Republic of the Congo, Uganda, and South Africa, where it has been recorded from Gauteng, KwaZulu-Natal, Limpopo, and North West.

== Habitat and ecology ==
The species inhabits altitudes ranging from 93 to 1,706 m above sea level and has been sampled from the Grassland and Savanna biomes. Singa lawrencei constructs small orb webs in low growing vegetation, herbs and grasses.

== Conservation ==
Singa lawrencei is listed as Least Concern by the South African National Biodiversity Institute due to its wide geographical range. The species is protected in eight protected areas including Tembe Elephant Park.

== Etymology ==
This species is named after South African arachnologist Reginald Frederick Lawrence.

== Taxonomy ==
The species was originally described by Roger de Lessert in 1930 as Araneus (S.) lawrencei from the Democratic Republic of the Congo. It is known only from females.
