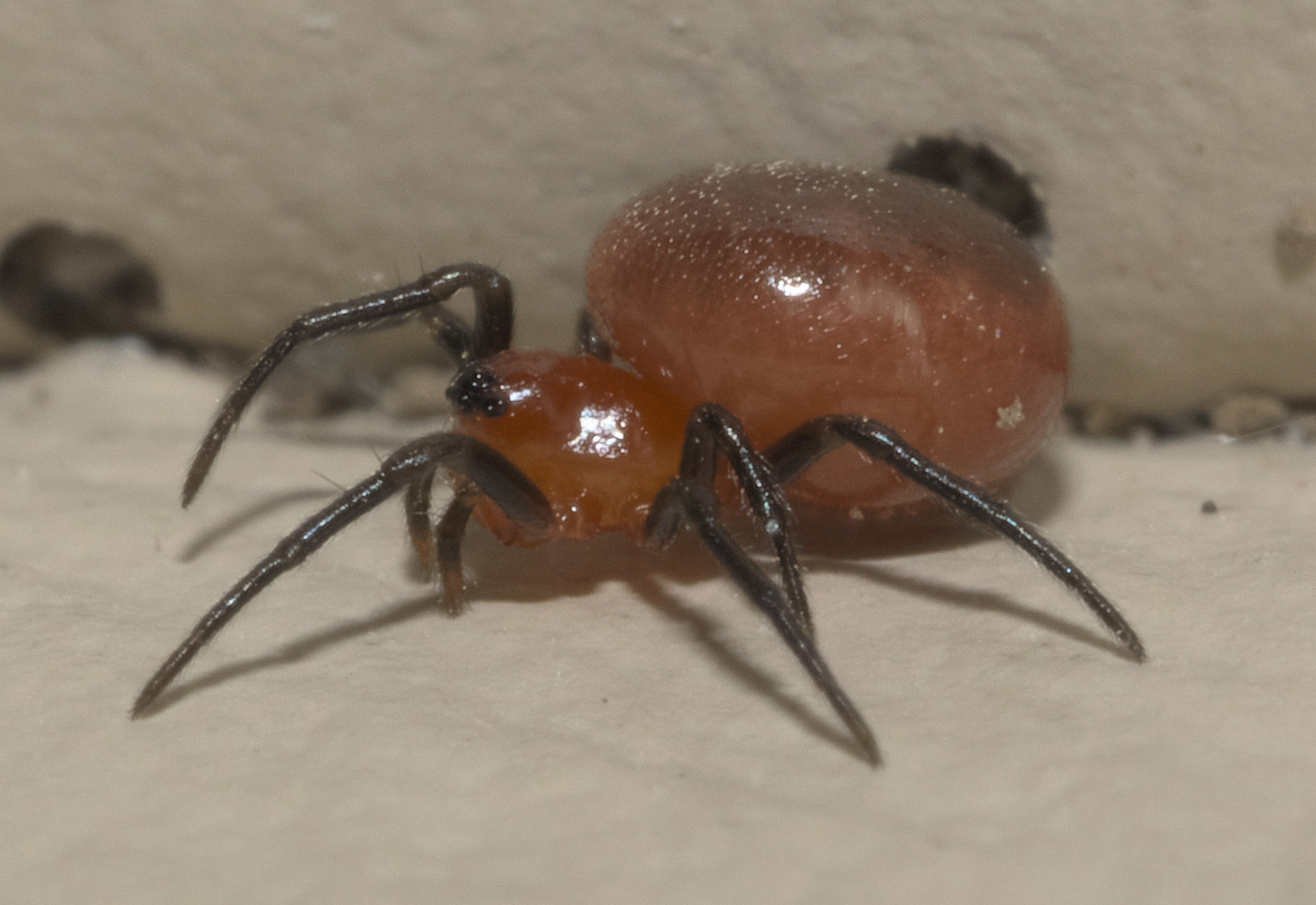

Scientific classification
- Domain: Eukaryota
- Kingdom: Animalia
- Phylum: Arthropoda
- Subphylum: Chelicerata
- Class: Arachnida
- Order: Araneae
- Infraorder: Araneomorphae
- Family: Araneidae
- Genus: Hypsosinga
- Species: H. rubens

Binomial name
- Hypsosinga rubens (Hentz, 1847)

= Hypsosinga rubens =

Species of spider

Hypsosinga rubens is a species of orb weaver in the spider family Araneidae. It is found in the United States and Canada.

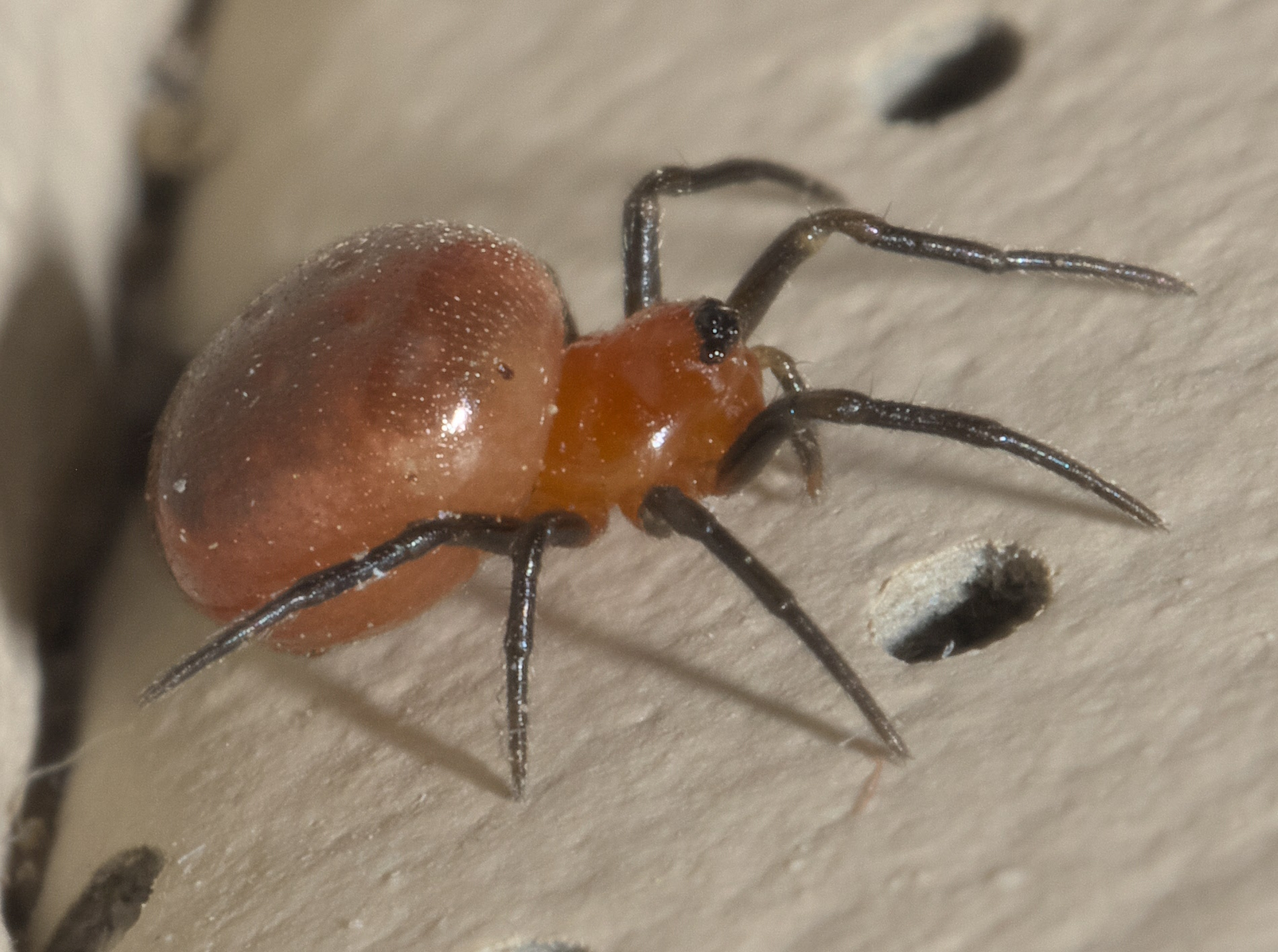
