= Singa keyserlingi =

Scientific classification
- Domain: Eukaryota
- Kingdom: Animalia
- Phylum: Arthropoda
- Subphylum: Chelicerata
- Class: Arachnida
- Order: Araneae
- Infraorder: Araneomorphae
- Family: Araneidae
- Genus: Singa
- Species: S. keyserlingi

Binomial name
- Singa keyserlingi McCook, 1894

Species of spider

Singa keyserlingi is a species of orb weaver in the spider family Araneidae. It is found in the United States and Canada.
