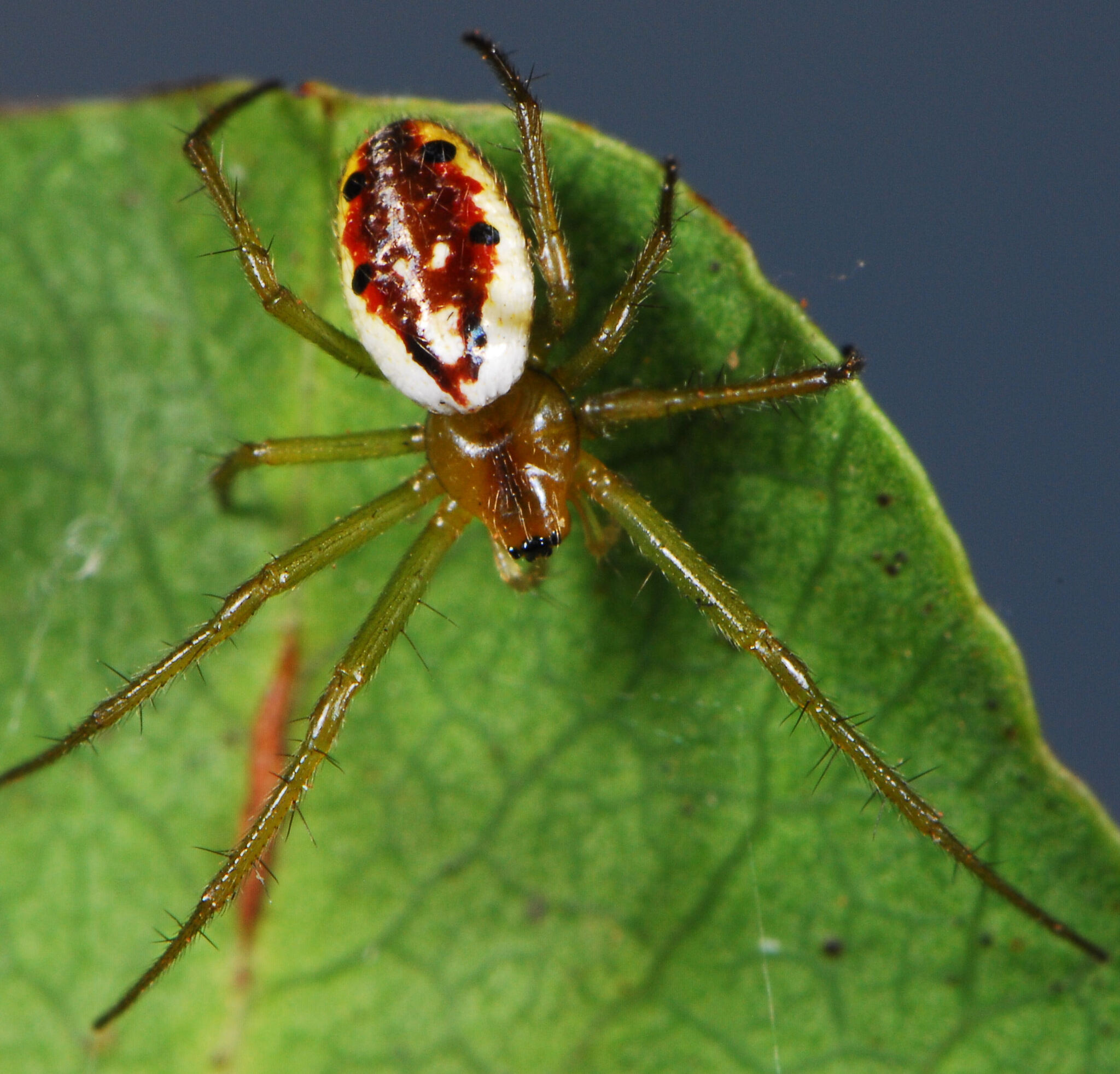
- female
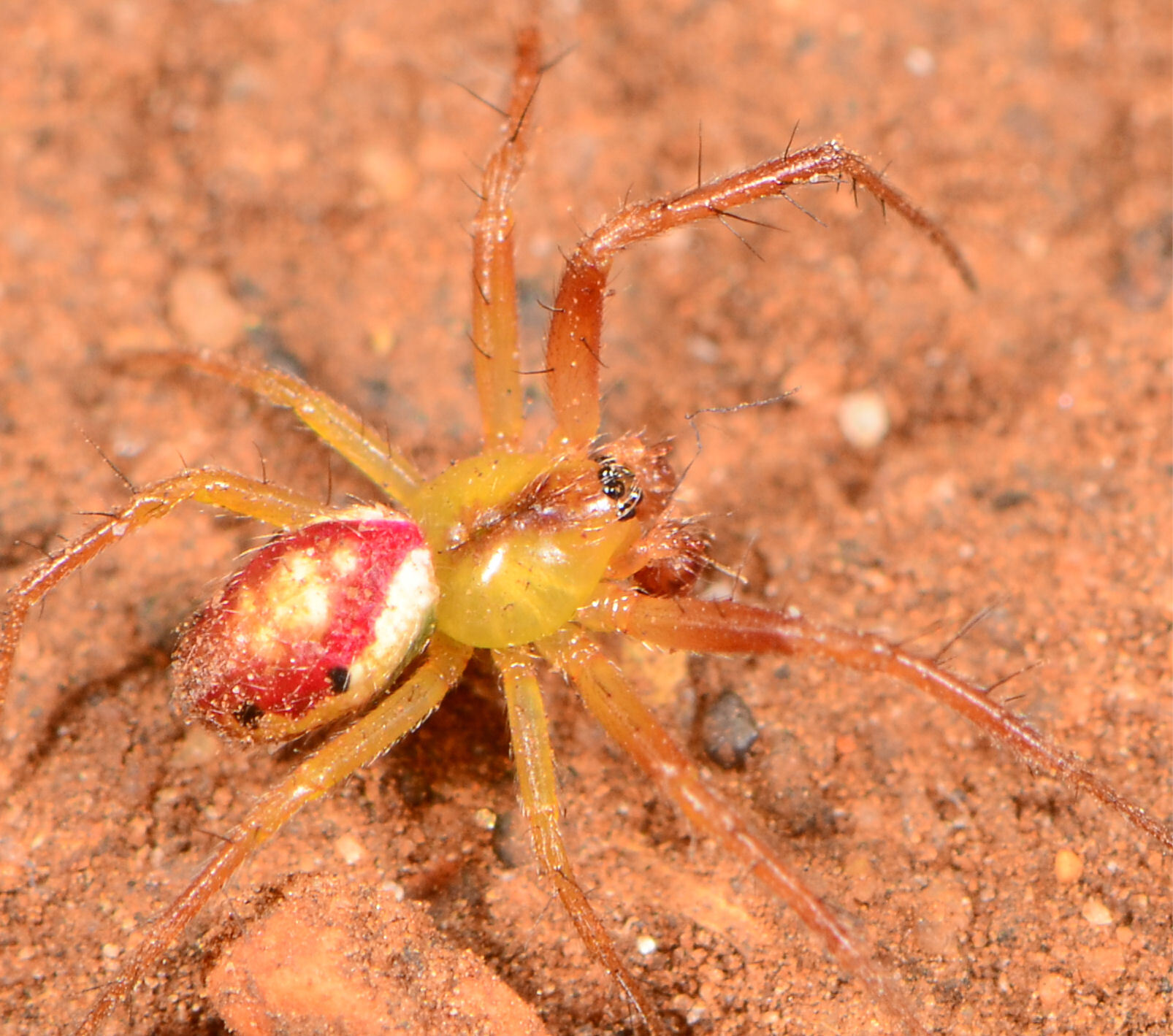
- male

Scientific classification
- Kingdom: Animalia
- Phylum: Arthropoda
- Subphylum: Chelicerata
- Class: Arachnida
- Order: Araneae
- Infraorder: Araneomorphae
- Family: Araneidae
- Genus: Hypsosinga
- Species: H. holzapfelae

Binomial name
- Hypsosinga holzapfelae (Lessert, 1936)

Synonyms
- Araneus holzapfeli Lessert, 1936

= Hypsosinga holzapfelae =

Spotted Araneus Hairy Field Spider

Species of spider

Hypsosinga holzapfelae is a species of spider in the family Araneidae. It is commonly known as the spotted Araneus hairy field spider. The species found from Kenya to South Africa.

== Distribution ==
Hypsosinga holzapfelae is known from Mozambique, Kenya and South Africa. The species is possibly under-collected and is suspected to occur in countries in between.

The South African distribution includes Gauteng, KwaZulu-Natal, Limpopo, Mpumalanga, and North West provinces. Notable localities include Ezemvelo Nature Reserve, Faerie Glenn Nature Reserve, Empangeni, Tembe Elephant Park, Blouberg Nature Reserve, Kruger National Park, and Rustenburg Nature Reserve.

== Habitat and ecology ==
Hypsosinga holzapfelae are orb-web spiders that construct their webs in vegetation. The species has been sampled from the Savanna and Thicket biomes at altitudes from 78 to 1,556 m above sea level. It has also been recorded from macadamia and avocado orchards, and tomatoes.

== Description ==
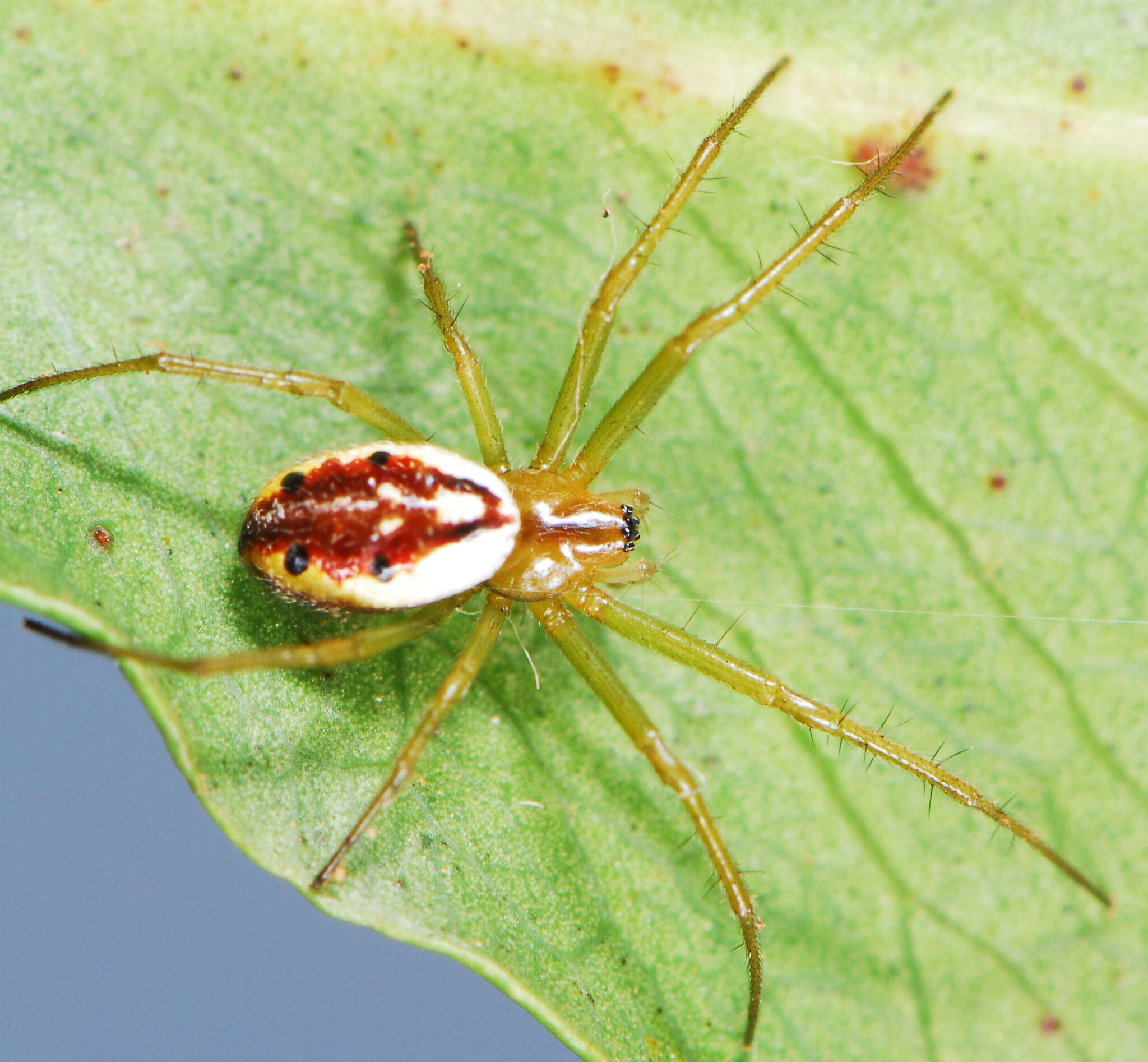
female

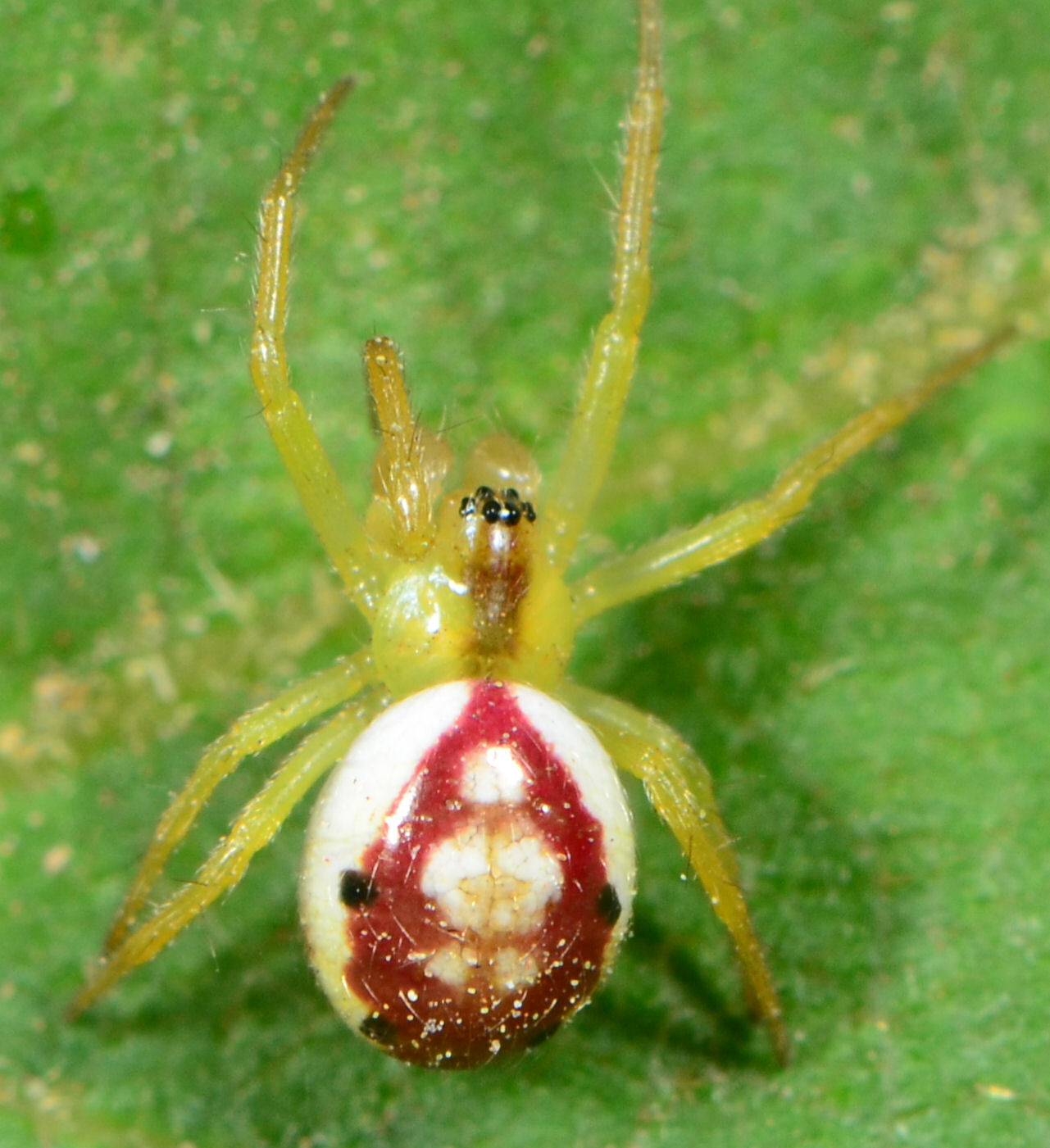
juvenile

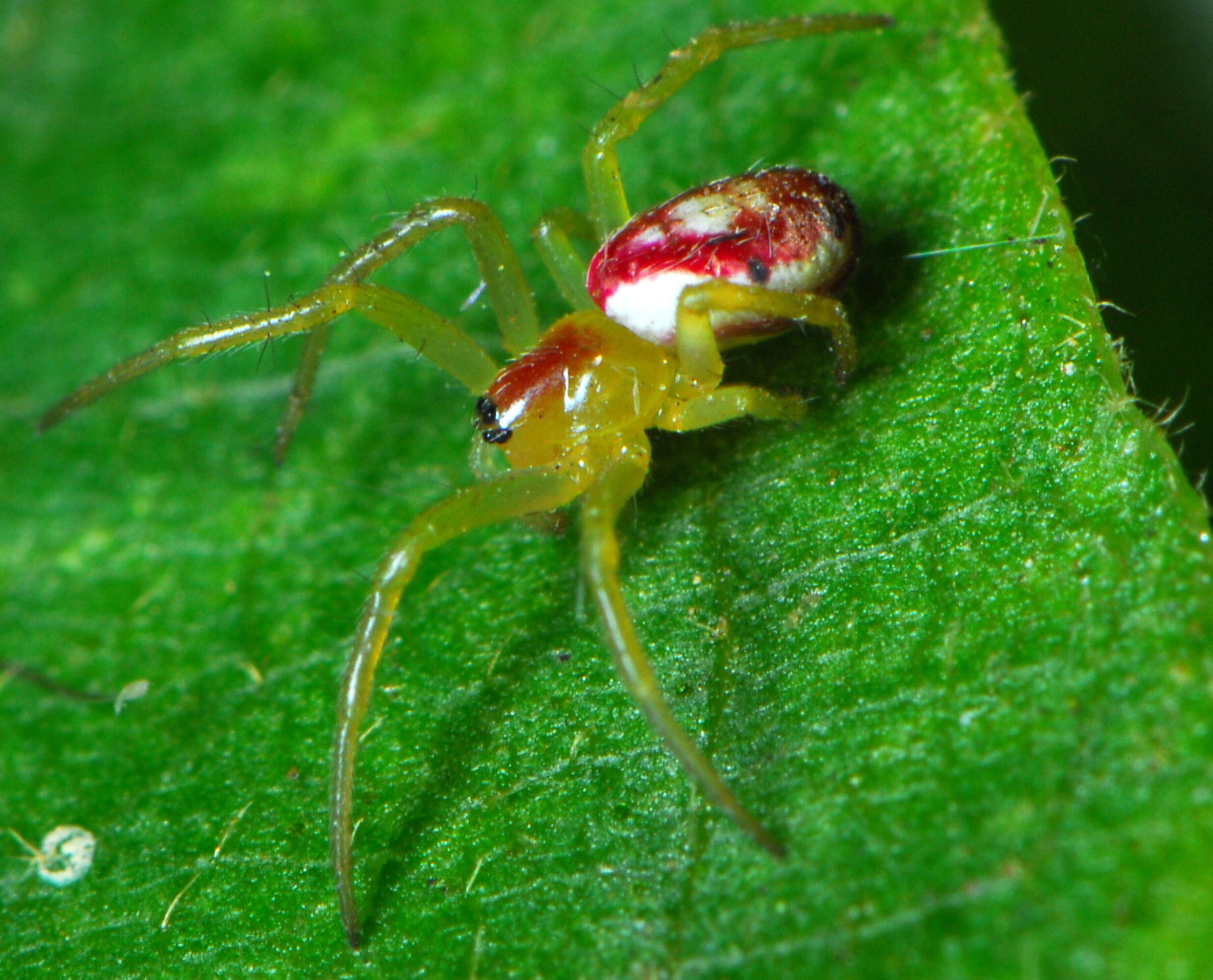
juvenile

== Conservation ==
Hypsosinga holzapfelae is listed as Least Concern by the South African National Biodiversity Institute due to its wide geographical range. The species has been sampled from 11 protected areas including Tembe Elephant park, Blouberg, Makelali Nature Reserve and Kruger National Park. No conservation actions are recommended.

== Etymology ==
Swiss arachnologist Roger de Lessert named this species after Monika Holzapfel-Meyer, a Swiss biologist active in the 1930s and 1940s.

== Taxonomy ==
The species has not been revised and is known from both sexes.
