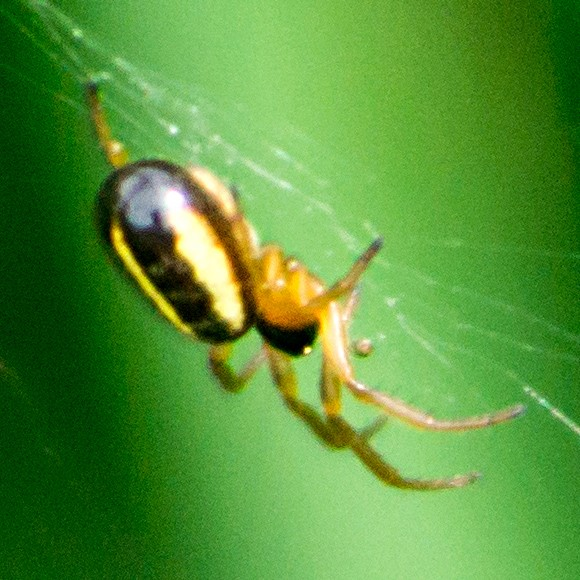

Scientific classification
- Kingdom: Animalia
- Phylum: Arthropoda
- Subphylum: Chelicerata
- Class: Arachnida
- Order: Araneae
- Infraorder: Araneomorphae
- Family: Araneidae
- Genus: Singa
- Species: S. eugeni

Binomial name
- Singa eugeni Levi, 1972

= Singa eugeni =

Species of spider

Singa eugeni is a species of orb weaver in the spider family Araneidae. It is found in the United States.
