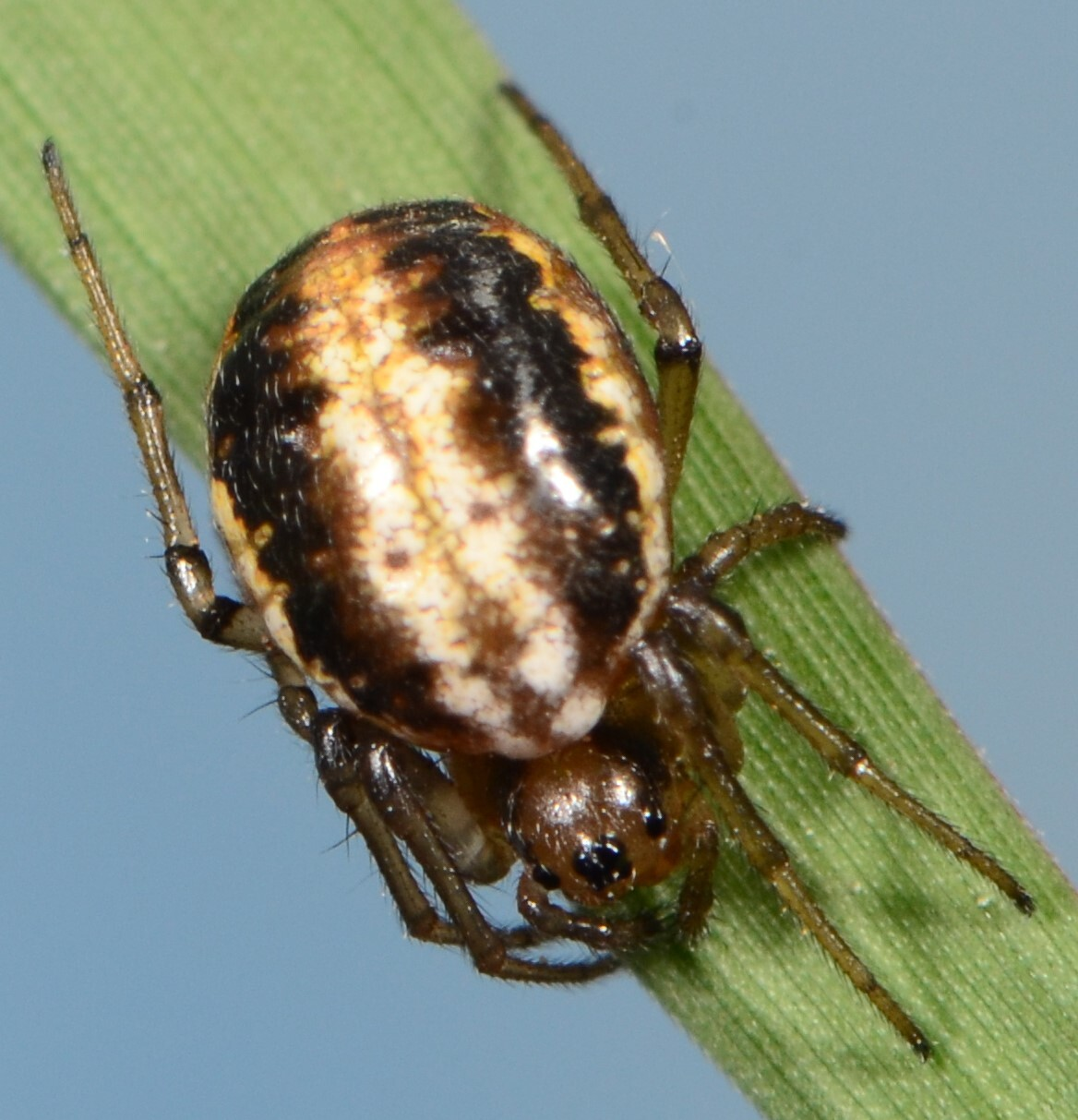
- female H. lithyphantoides
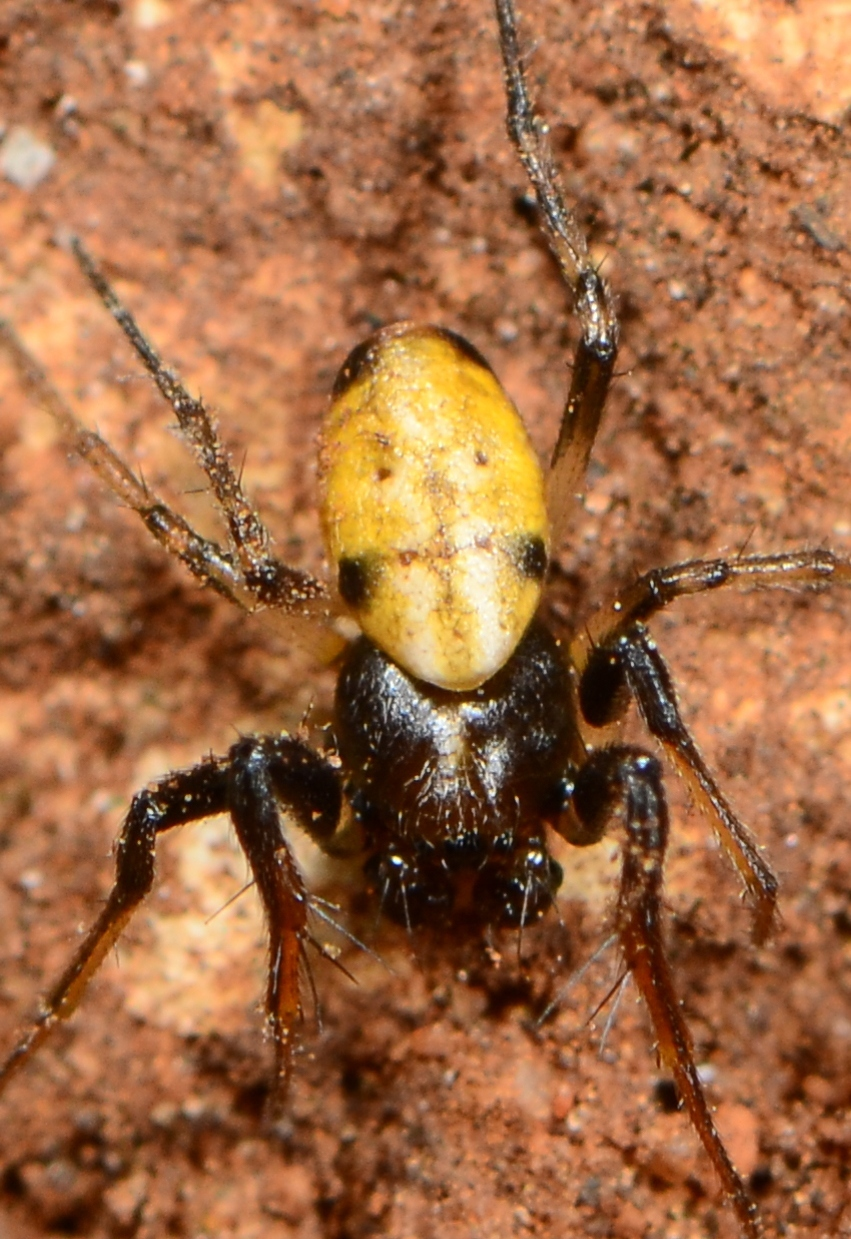
- male H. pygmaea

Scientific classification
- Kingdom: Animalia
- Phylum: Arthropoda
- Subphylum: Chelicerata
- Class: Arachnida
- Order: Araneae
- Infraorder: Araneomorphae
- Family: Araneidae
- Genus: Hypsosinga; Ausserer, 1871

Type species
- H. sanguinea (C. L. Koch, 1844)

Species
- 19, see text

= Hypsosinga =

Genus of spiders

Hypsosinga is a genus of orb-weaver spiders first described by Anton Ausserer in 1871, with a wide global distribution.

== Distribution ==
Most Hypsosinga species are found in Eurasia from Greenland to Japan, while a few occur in Africa and North America

In 2015, female Hypsosinga heri spiders were identified at the RSPB Radipole Lake nature reserve in Dorset, England. The previous recorded sightings of the species in the UK were in 1898 and 1912 at Wicken Fen, Cambridgeshire.

== Life style ==
Hypsosinga live on low plants where their small orb-webs frequently go unnoticed. Levy (1984) reported on a species that lives under stones and which could easily be confused with theridiids (especially Steatoda spp.). Hypsosinga make a complete orb-web sually with a retreat. They are frequently sampled in sweep nets in grassland.

== Description ==
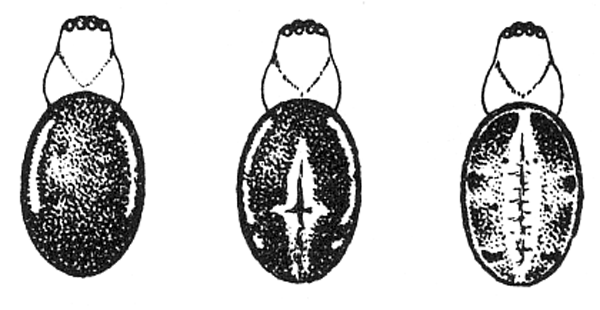
Markings of the back of Singa variabilis (H. pygmaea).

The genera Singa and Hypsosinga comprise small spiders identifiable by a shiny body decorated with spots or lines. Hypsosinga has a carapace that is smooth and rather wide in front, wider than the eye area, with no thoracic depression or sometimes only a small longitudinal black mark in the male.

The integument is shiny, the eye area is usually black, and the posterior median eyes are usually their own diameter apart. Hypsosinga differs from Singa in having the posterior median eyes as the largest, while the ocular quadrangle is wider behind than in front, or rectangular.

The abdomen in Hypsosinga, unlike that of Singa, tends to be oval and widest in the middle, with either two dorsal longitudinal bands or four dark spots. The epigynum differs from those of both Singa and Araneus in lacking a scape.

== Etymology ==
The genus name is derived from the Greek "hypso", meaning "high", referring to the higher clypeus than those of the genus Singa.

== Species ==
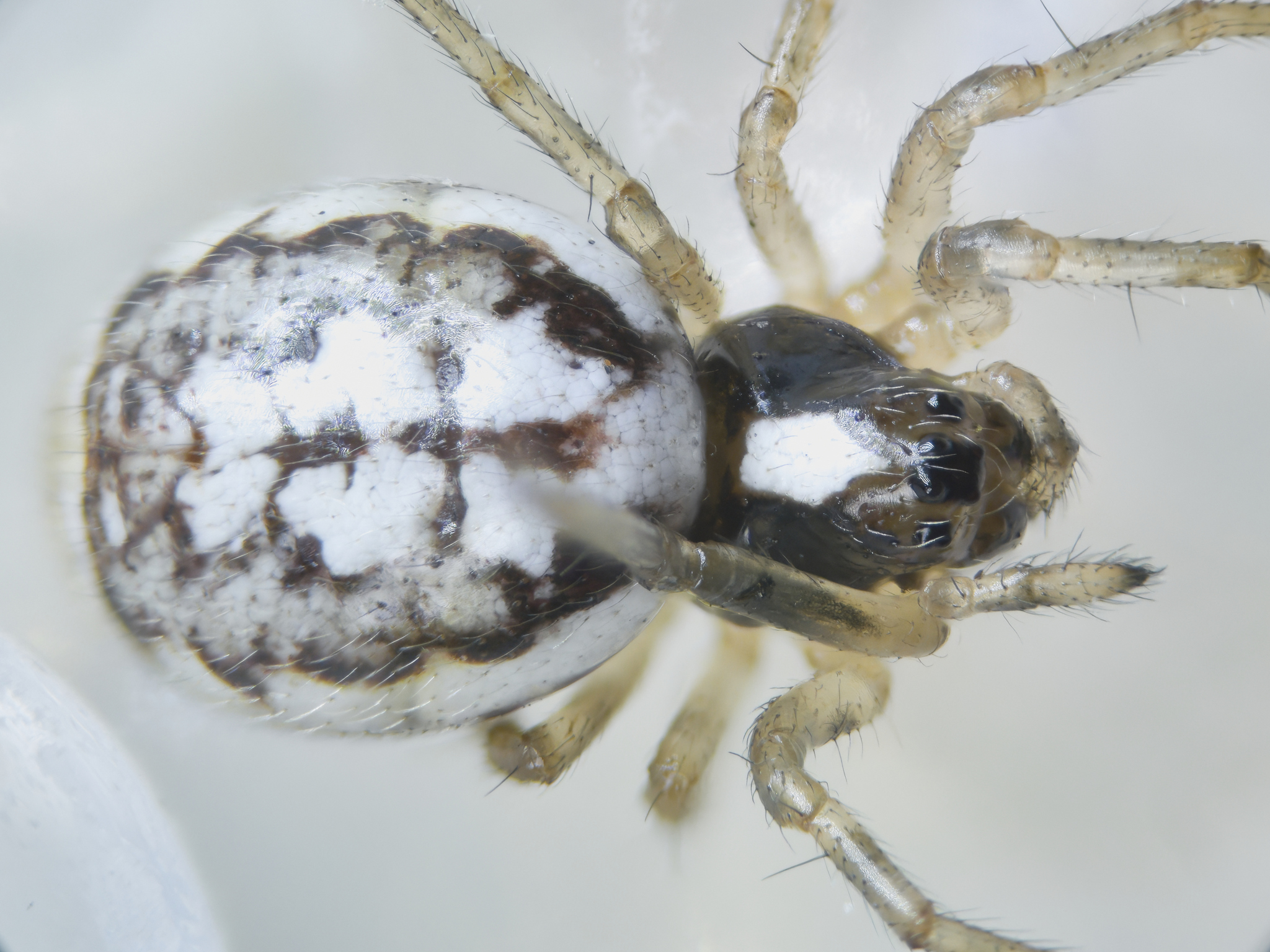
Hypsosinga albovittata

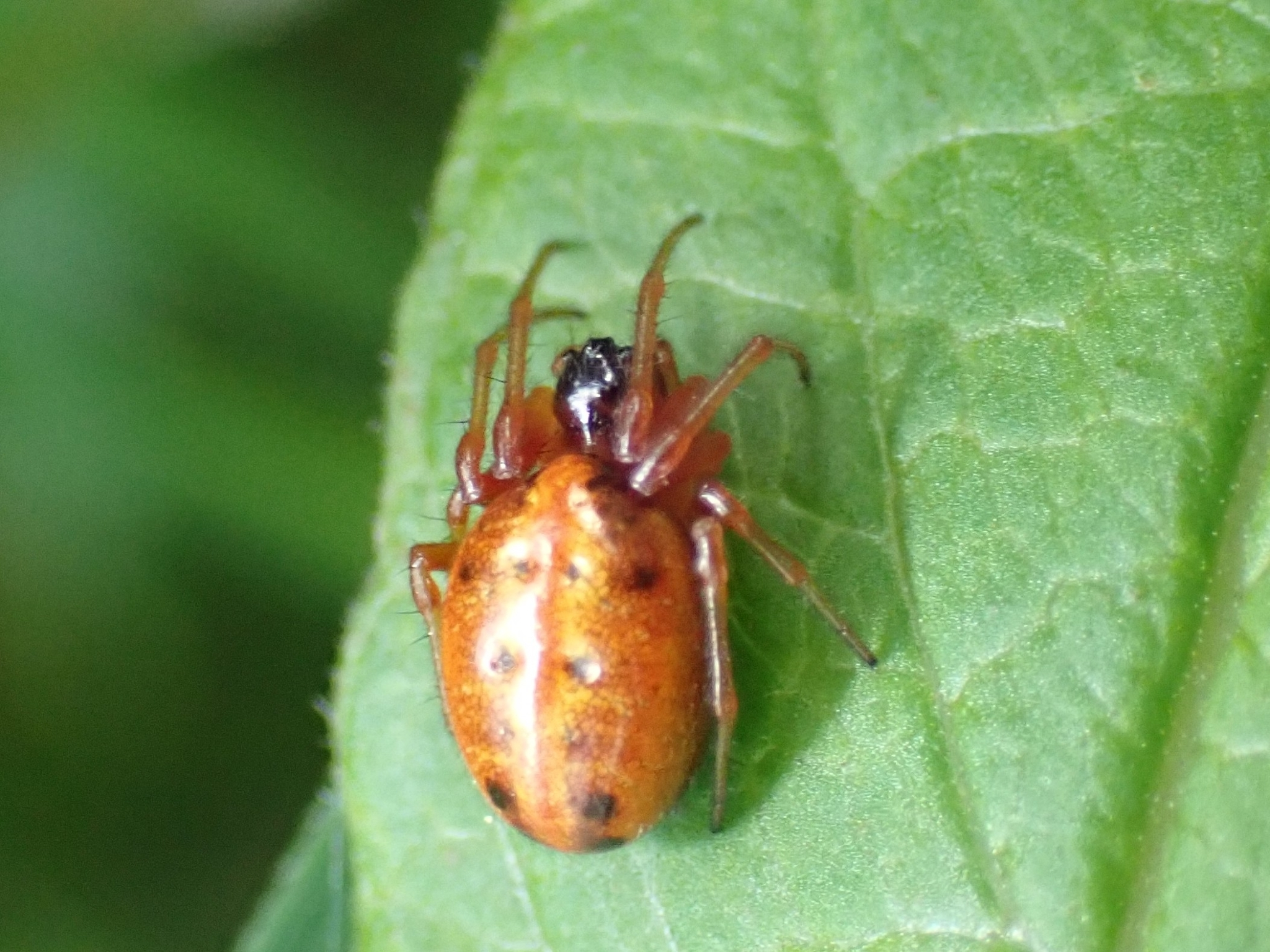
H. heri

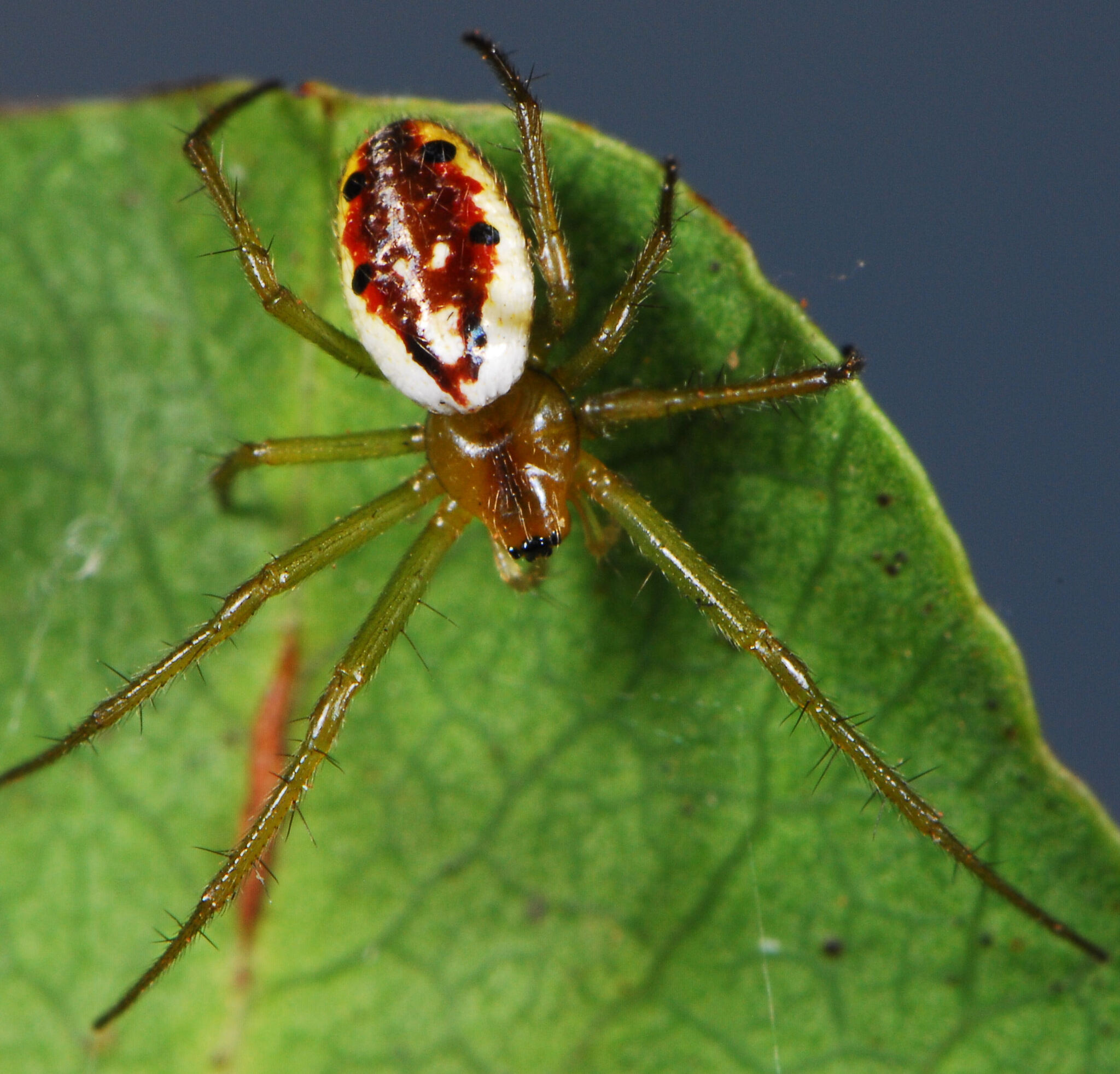
female H. holzapfelae

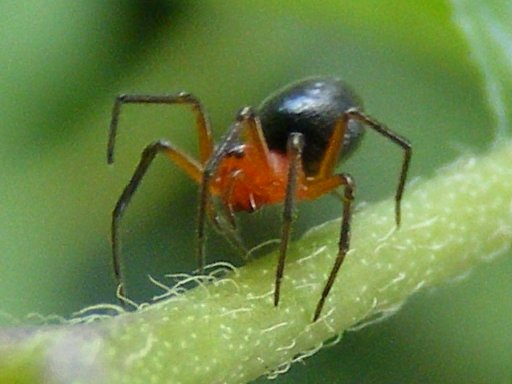
H. pygmaea

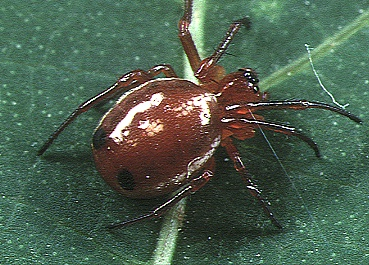
female H. sanguinea

As of November 2026, this genus includes nineteen species and three subspecies:

- Hypsosinga alberta Levi, 1972 – Russia (East Siberia), Canada
- Hypsosinga alboria Yin, Wang, Xie & Peng, 1990 – China
- Hypsosinga albovittata (Westring, 1851) – Europe, North Africa, Turkey, Caucasus, Russia (Europe to Far East), Middle East, Central Asia
- Hypsosinga clax Oliger, 1993 – Russia (Far East)
- Hypsosinga funebris (Keyserling, 1892) – Canada, United States
- Hypsosinga groenlandica Simon, 1889 – United States, Canada, Greenland
- Hypsosinga heri (Hahn, 1831) – Europe, Caucasus, Russia (Europe to Central Asia, West Siberia), Israel, Iran, Central Asia, China
- Hypsosinga holzapfelae (Lessert, 1936) – Kenya, Mozambique, South Africa
- Hypsosinga kazachstanica Ponomarev, 2007 – Kazakhstan
- Hypsosinga lithyphantoides Caporiacco, 1947 – Uganda, Kenya, South Africa
  - H. l. dealbata Caporiacco, 1949 – Kenya
- Hypsosinga pulla Mi & Li, 2021 – China
- Hypsosinga pygmaea (Sundevall, 1831) – North America, Europe, Turkey, Israel, Caucasus, Russia (Europe to Far East), Iran, Central Asia, China, Korea, Japan. Introduced to South Africa
  - H. p. nigra (Simon, 1909) – Vietnam
  - H. p. nigriceps (Kulczyński, 1903) – Turkey
- Hypsosinga rubens (Hentz, 1847) – Canada, United States
- Hypsosinga sanguinea (C. L. Koch, 1844) – Europe, North Africa, Turkey, Russia (Europe to Far East), Iran, Central Asia, China, Korea, Japan (type species)
- Hypsosinga satpuraensis Bodkhe, Uniyal & Kamble, 2016 – India
- Hypsosinga taprobanica (Simon, 1895) – Sri Lanka
- Hypsosinga turkmenica Bakhvalov, 1978 – Turkmenistan
- Hypsosinga vaulogeri (Simon, 1909) – Vietnam
- Hypsosinga wanica Song, Qian & Gao, 1996 – China
