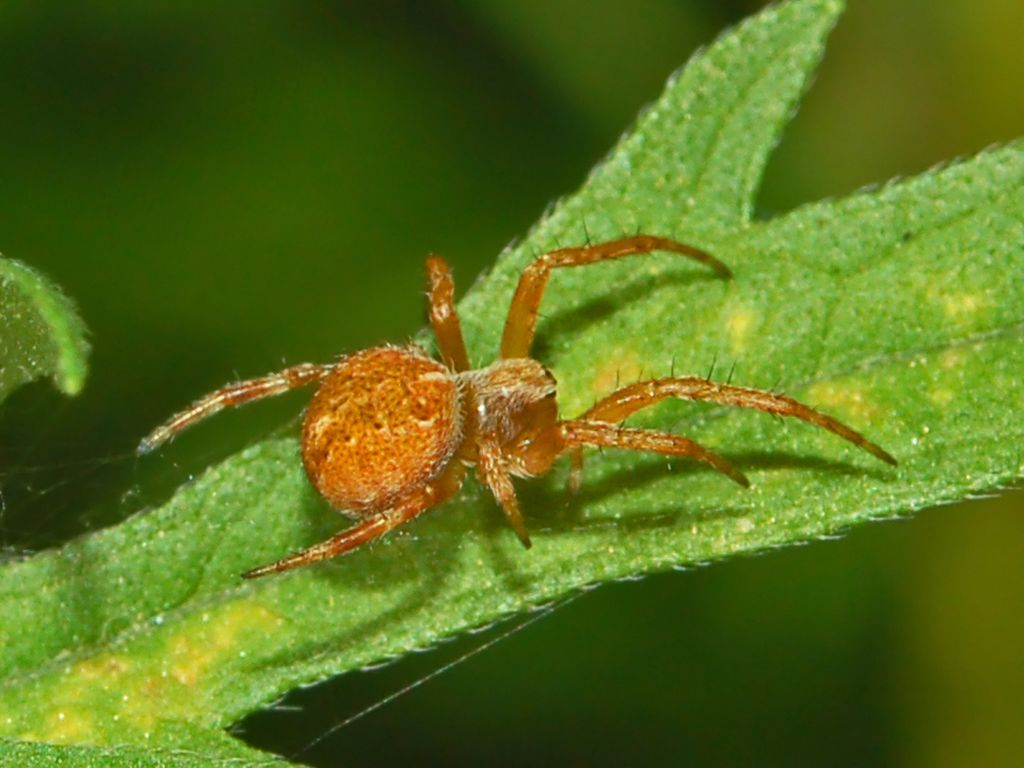
- Agalenatea redii

Scientific classification
- Kingdom: Animalia
- Phylum: Arthropoda
- Subphylum: Chelicerata
- Class: Arachnida
- Order: Araneae
- Infraorder: Araneomorphae
- Family: Araneidae
- Genus: Agalenatea; Archer, 1951

Type species
- A. redii (Scopoli, 1763)

Species
- A. liriope (L. Koch, 1875) – Ethiopia, Yemen; A. redii (Scopoli, 1763) – Europe, Turkey, Caucasus, Russia (Europe to South Siberia), Iran, Central Asia, China

= Agalenatea =

Genus of spiders

Agalenatea is a genus of orb-weaver spiders first described by Allan Frost Archer in 1951. As of October 2026 it contains only two species: A. redii with a palearctic distribution and A. liriope, found in Ethiopia and Yemen.
