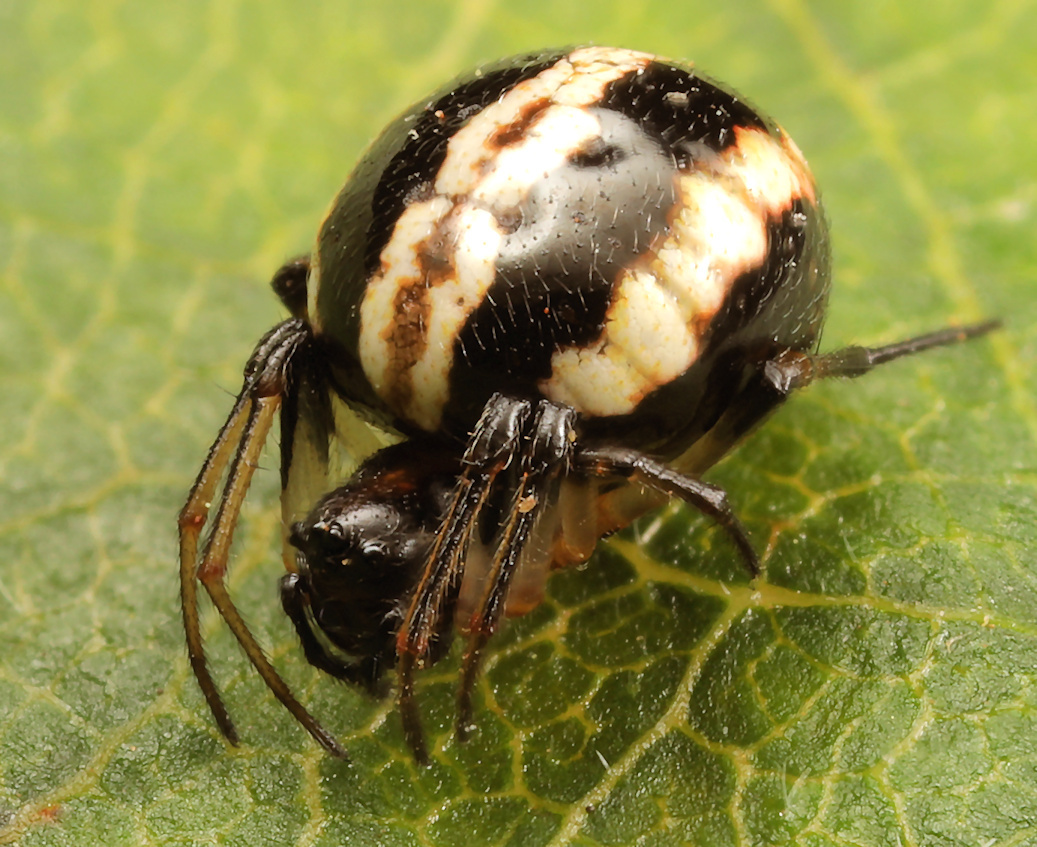
- S. albodorsata
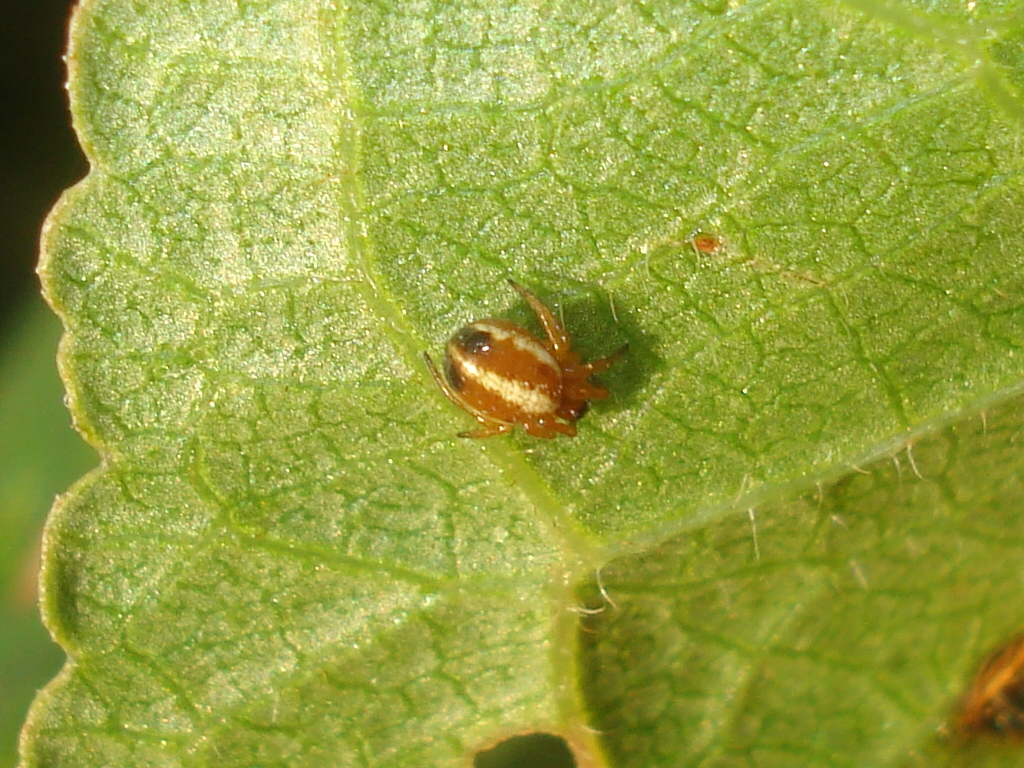
- Singa nitidula

Scientific classification
- Kingdom: Animalia
- Phylum: Arthropoda
- Subphylum: Chelicerata
- Class: Arachnida
- Order: Araneae
- Infraorder: Araneomorphae
- Family: Araneidae
- Genus: Singa; C. L. Koch, 1836

Type species
- S. hamata (Clerck, 1757)

Species
- 28, see text

= Singa (spider) =

Genus of spiders

Singa, also called striped orb-weavers, is a genus of orb-weaver spiders first described by C. L. Koch in 1836. They are small for orb-weavers, reaching 6 millimetres (0.24 in) or less in body length, excluding the legs.

== Distribution ==
Of the about thirty species, the majority is found in Eurasia from Norway to the Philippines. Three species live in southern Africa, and three in North America. S. Lucina can be found in North Africa.

=== Description ===
Females and males range from 3–6 mm in total length, with males slightly smaller than females. The colour varies from cream to brown to greyish-black with a uniformly dark carapace. The carapace is longer than wide with eight eyes in two rows. The anterior median eyes are largest, and the median ocular quadrangle is wider in front than behind. The abdomen is decorated with longitudinal stripes, oval-shaped, longer than wide, and overhangs the carapace. The legs are moderately long and kept close to the body when at rest.

=== Lifestyle ===
Very little is known about their behaviour. The small orb webs are made in low-growing vegetation, herbs or grasses.

== Species ==
As of September 2025, this genus includes 25 species and one subspecies:

- Singa albobivittata Caporiacco, 1947 – Tanzania
- Singa albodorsata Kauri, 1950 – South Africa, Lesotho, Eswatini
- Singa alpigena Yin, Wang & Li, 1983 – China
- Singa alpigenoides Song & Zhu, 1992 – China
- Singa ammophila Levy, 2007 – Israel
- Singa bifasciata Schenkel, 1936 – China
- Singa chota Tikader, 1970 – India
- Singa concinna Karsch, 1884 – São Tomé and Príncipe
- Singa cruciformis Yin, Peng & Wang, 1994 – China
- Singa cyanea (Worley, 1928) – United States
- Singa eugeni Levi, 1972 – Canada, United States
- Singa haddooensis Tikader, 1977 – India (Andaman Is.)
- Singa hamata (Clerck, 1757) – Europe, Turkey, Russia (Europe to Far East), Caucasus, Central Asia, China, Korea, Japan (type species)
- Singa hilira Barrion & Litsinger, 1995 – Philippines
- Singa kansuensis Schenkel, 1936 – China
- Singa keyserlingi McCook, 1894 – Canada, United States
- Singa lawrencei (Lessert, 1930) – DR Congo, Uganda, South Africa
- Singa leucoplagiata (Simon, 1899) – Indonesia (Sumatra)
- Singa lucina (Audouin, 1826) – Mediterranean, Central Asia
  - Singa lucina eburnea (Simon, 1929) – Algeria, Tunisia
- Singa myrrhea (Simon, 1895) – India
- Singa neta (O. Pickard-Cambridge, 1872) – Mediterranean, Iraq, Iran
- Singa nitidula C. L. Koch, 1844 – Europe, Turkey, Russia (Europe to Far East), Caucasus, Central Asia
- Singa semiatra L. Koch, 1867 – Mediterranean, Ukraine, Russia (Europe, Caucasus), Georgia, Iraq, Iran
- Singa simoniana Costa, 1885 – Italy (Sardinia)
- Singa theodori (Thorell, 1894) – Indonesia (Java)

== See also ==
- Hypsosinga
