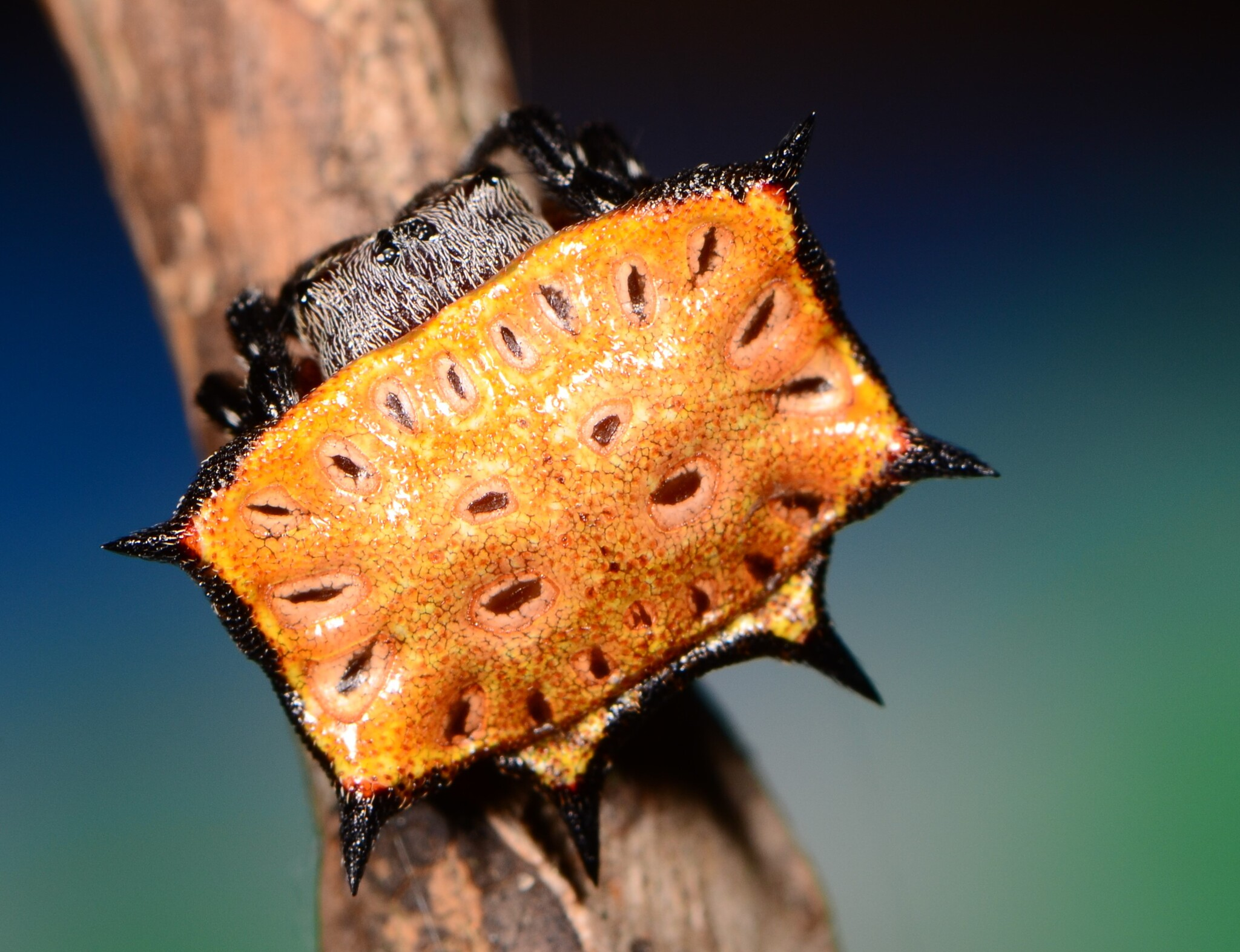
- female
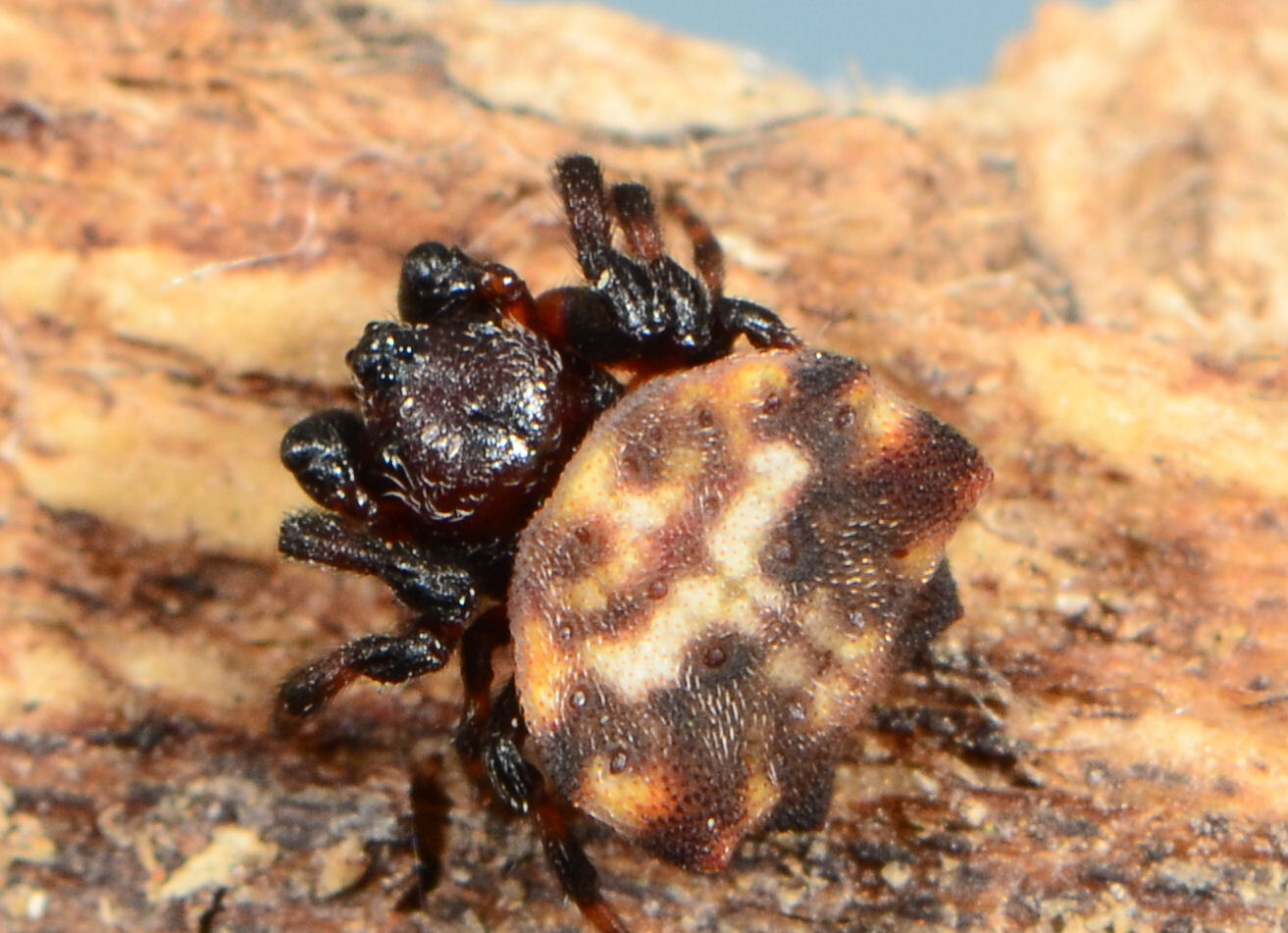
- male

Scientific classification
- Kingdom: Animalia
- Phylum: Arthropoda
- Subphylum: Chelicerata
- Class: Arachnida
- Order: Araneae
- Infraorder: Araneomorphae
- Family: Araneidae
- Genus: Isoxya
- Species: I. tabulata

Binomial name
- Isoxya tabulata (Thorell, 1859)

Synonyms
- Gasteracantha tabulata Thorell, 1859; Gasteracantha modesta Thorell, 1859; Gasteracantha cicatrella Strand, 1907; Gasteracantha kibonotensis Tullgren, 1910; Gasteracantha momboensis Tullgren, 1910

= Isoxya tabulata =

Yellow Isoxya Box Kite Spider

Species of spider

Isoxya tabulata is a species of spider in the family Araneidae. It is found in Africa and is commonly known as the yellow Isoxya box kite spider.

== Distribution ==
Isoxya tabulata is found in Democratic Republic of the Congo, Malawi, Tanzania, Angola, Zimbabwe, Mozambique, South Africa, and Eswatini.

In South Africa, the species is recorded from Eastern Cape, KwaZulu-Natal, Limpopo, North West and Western Cape.

== Habitat and ecology ==
The species has been sampled from Forest, Grassland, Indian Ocean Coastal Belt, Savanna and Thicket biomes at altitudes ranging from 1 to 1,399 m above sea level. The web is usually decorated with silk tufts. The species was also sampled from citrus orchards and tomato fields.

During the day, the species can be found in large orb-webs usually made high between trees.

== Description ==
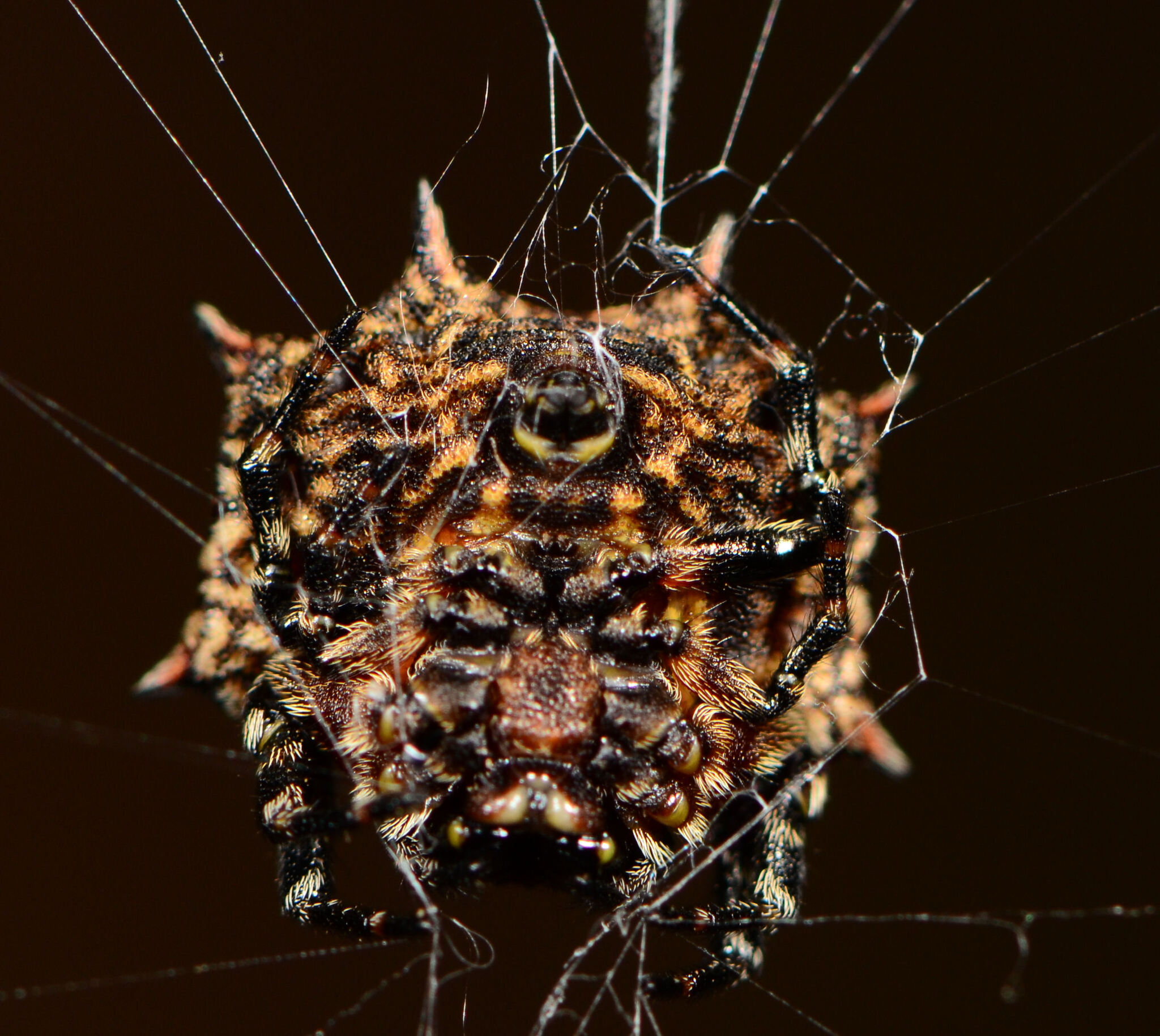
female

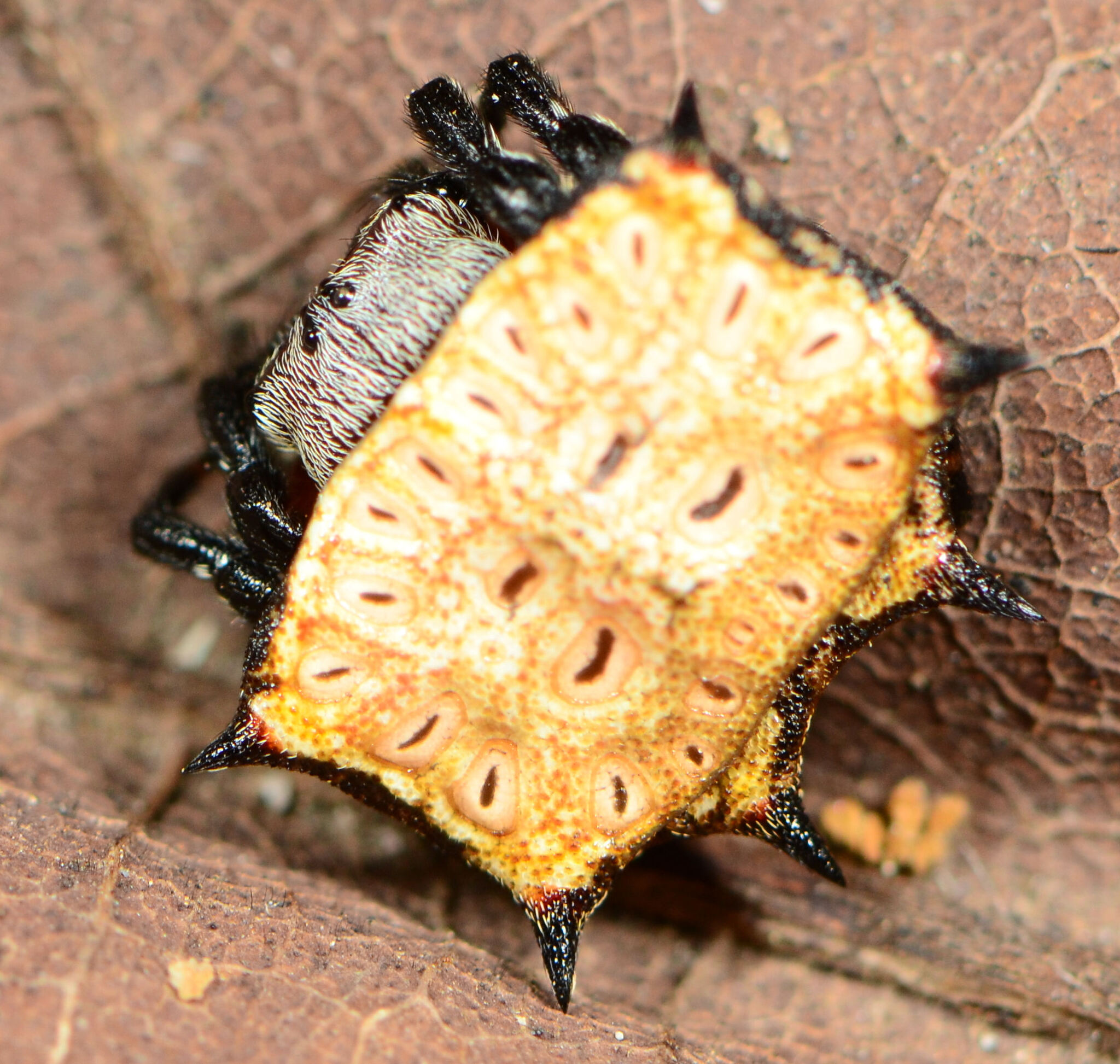
female

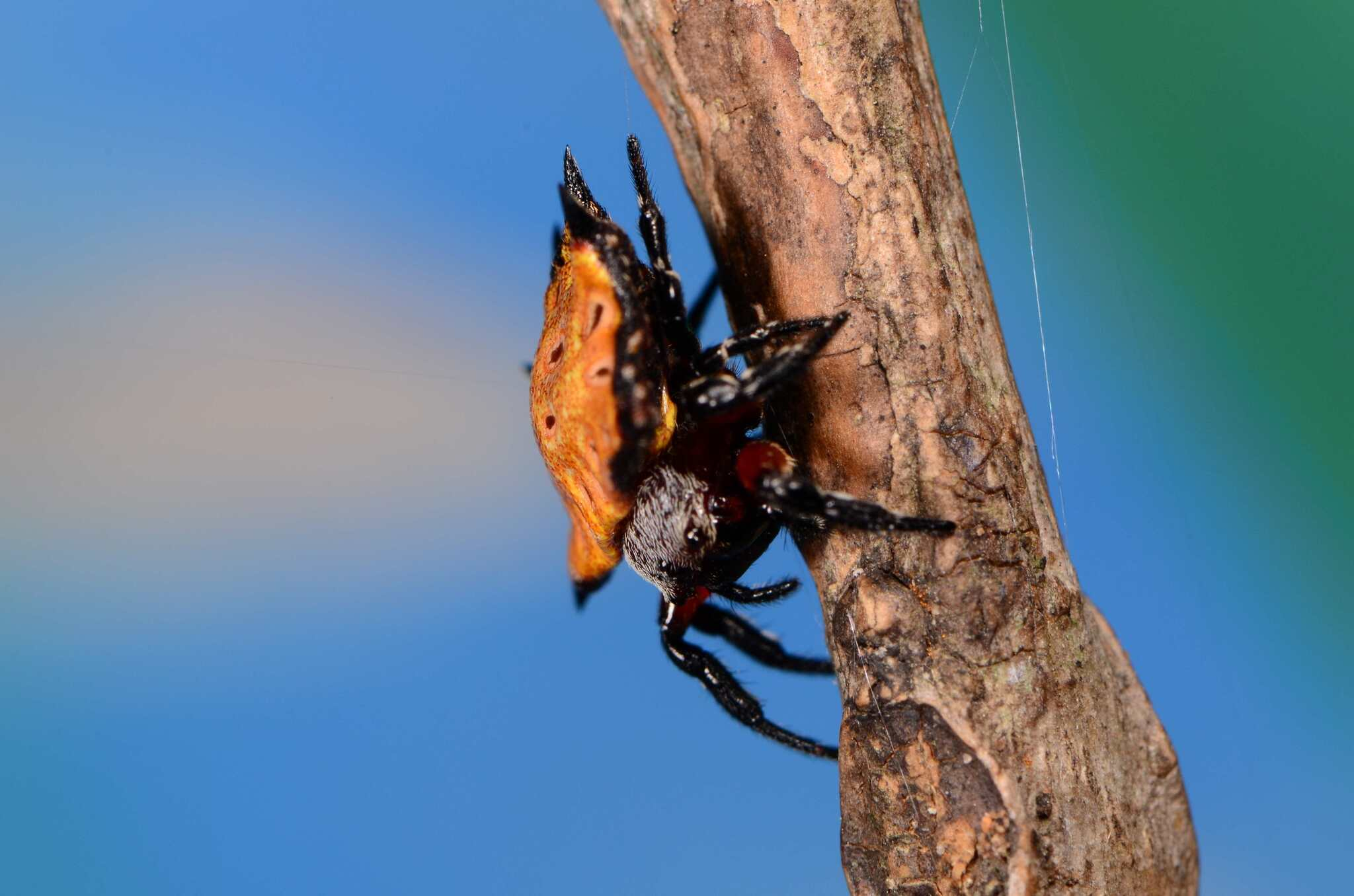
female

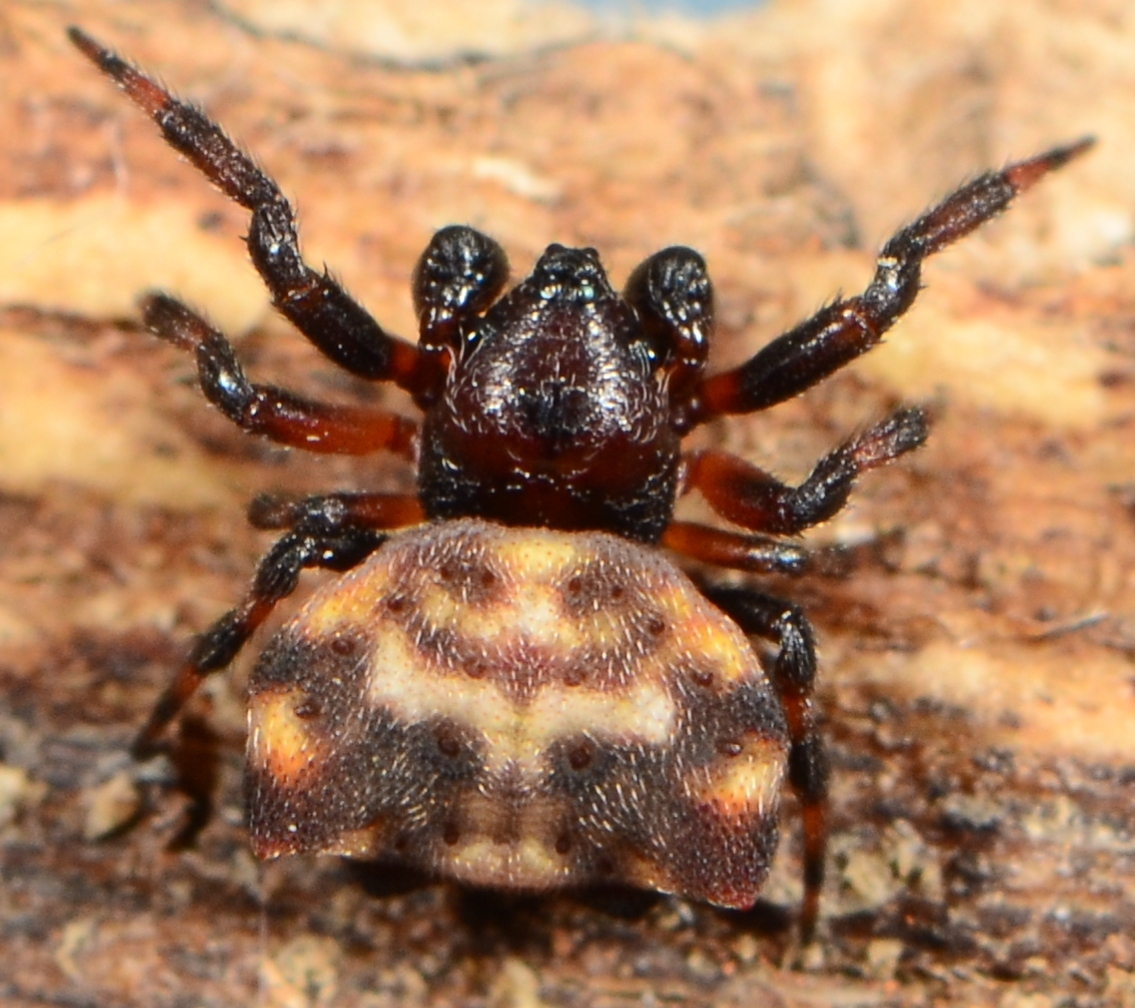
male

== Conservation ==
Isoxya tabulata is listed as Least Concern by the South African National Biodiversity Institute due to its wide geographical range across nine African countries. The species is protected in more than 20 protected areas including Ndumo Game Reserve, Tembe Elephant Park, Kruger National Park, and Addo Elephant National Park.

== Taxonomy ==
The species was originally described by Tamerlan Thorell in 1859 as Gasteracantha tabulata from the Democratic Republic of the Congo. It was later transferred to the genus Isoxya by Benoit in 1962. Both male and female specimens are known. This species closely resembles Isoxya stuhlmanni.
