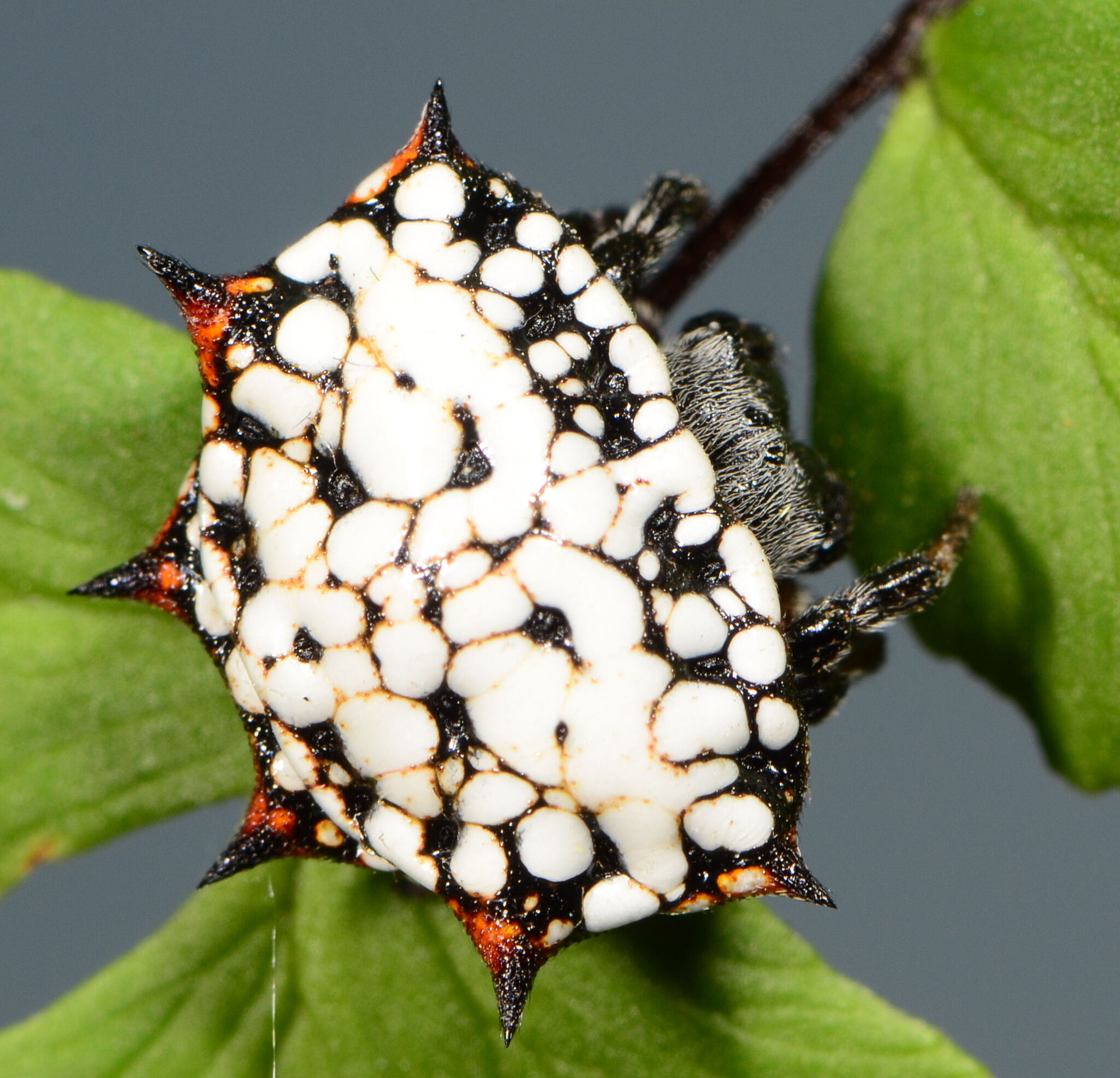
- female
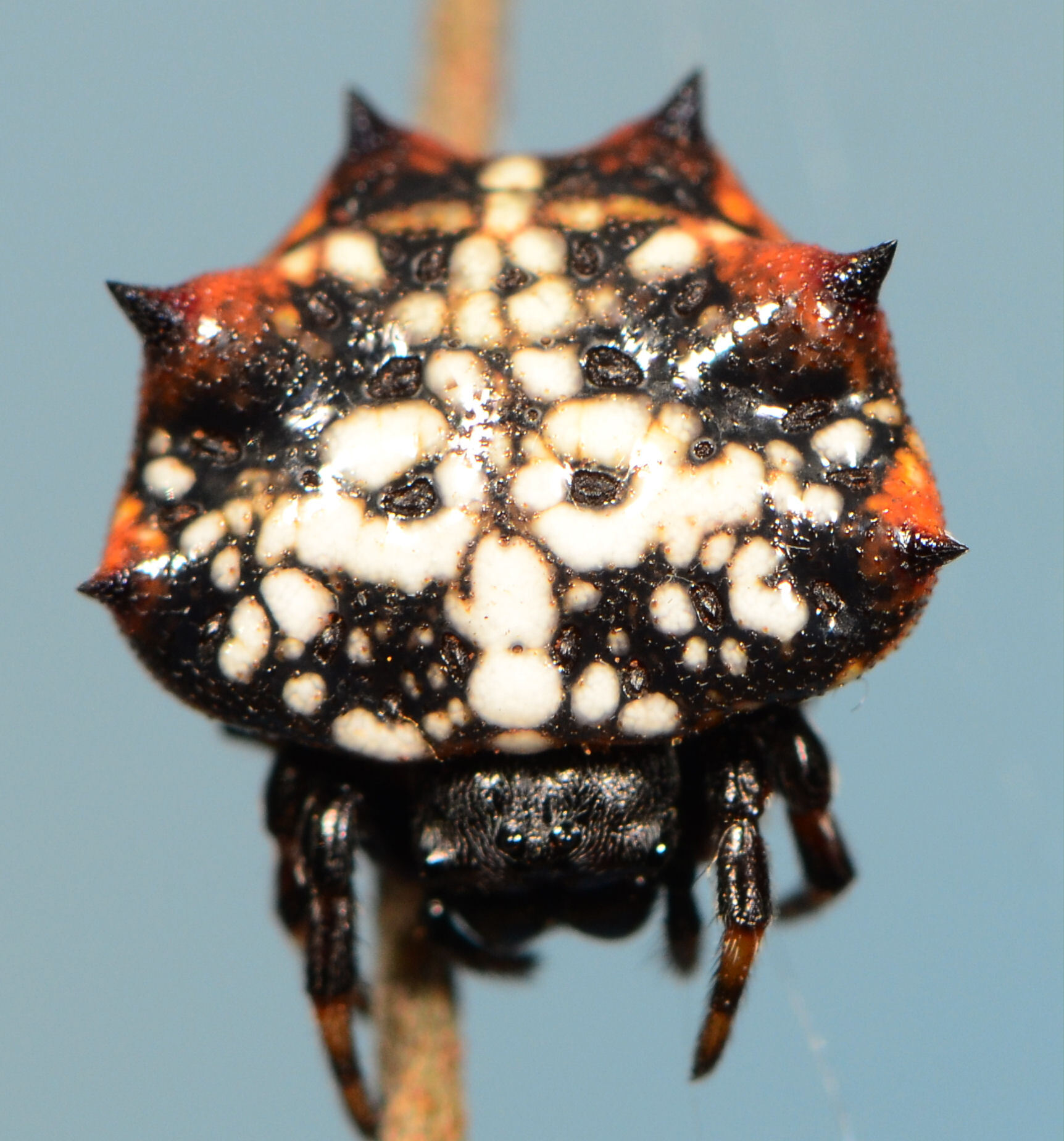
- female

Scientific classification
- Kingdom: Animalia
- Phylum: Arthropoda
- Subphylum: Chelicerata
- Class: Arachnida
- Order: Araneae
- Infraorder: Araneomorphae
- Family: Araneidae
- Genus: Isoxya
- Species: I. mossamedensis

Binomial name
- Isoxya mossamedensis Benoit, 1962

= Isoxya mossamedensis =

Angola Isoxya Box Kite Spider

Species of spider

Isoxya mossamedensis is a species of spider in the family Araneidae. It is found in southern Africa and is commonly known as the Angola Isoxya box kite spider.

== Distribution ==
Isoxya mossamedensis is found in Angola and South Africa. In South Africa, the species has been recorded from Mpumalanga, Gauteng, and Western Cape.

== Habitat and ecology ==
The species has been sampled from Grassland and Nama Karoo biomes at altitudes ranging from 400 to 1,692 m above sea level.

The species makes orb-webs between vegetation. Spiders are found in the web during the day.

== Description ==
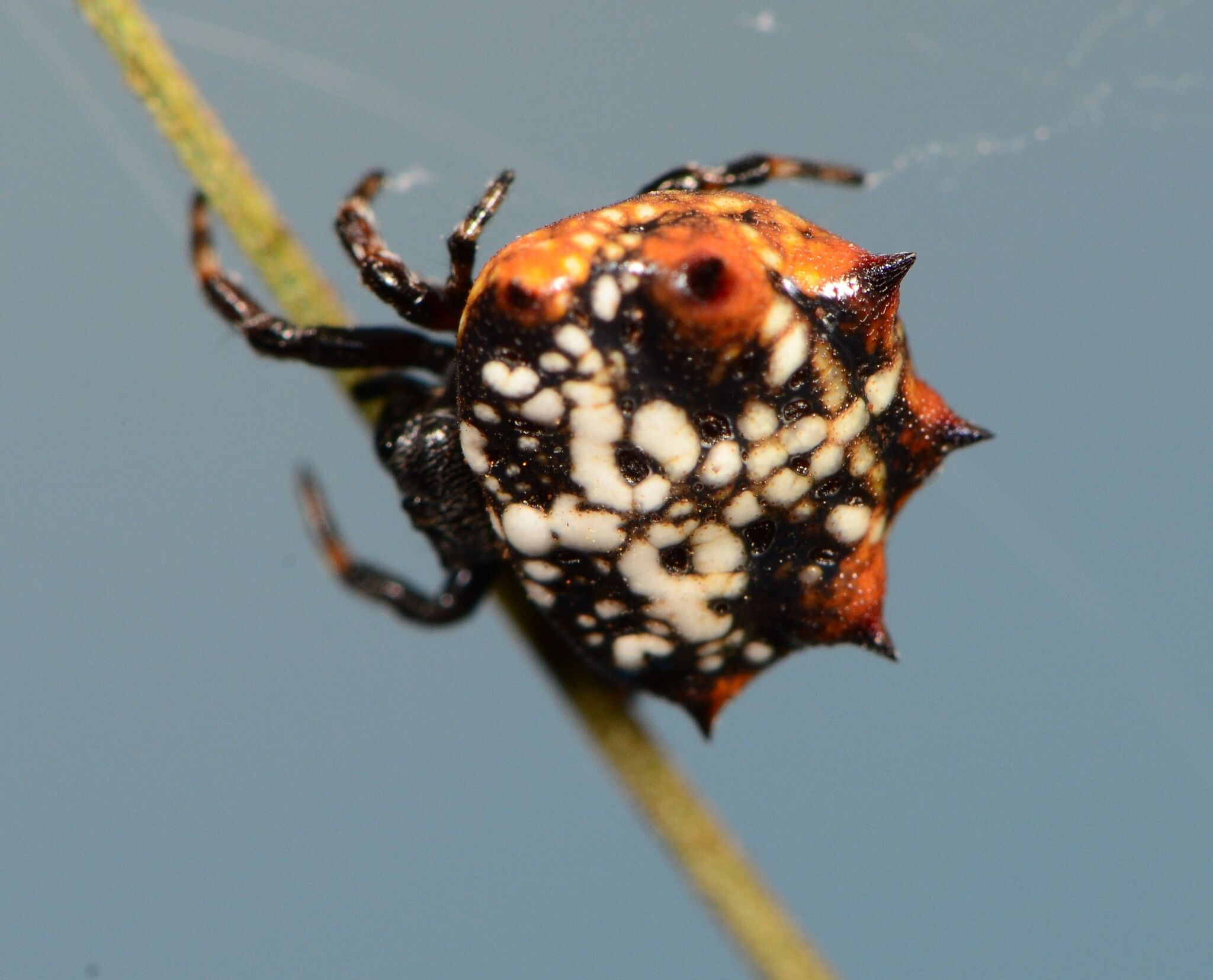

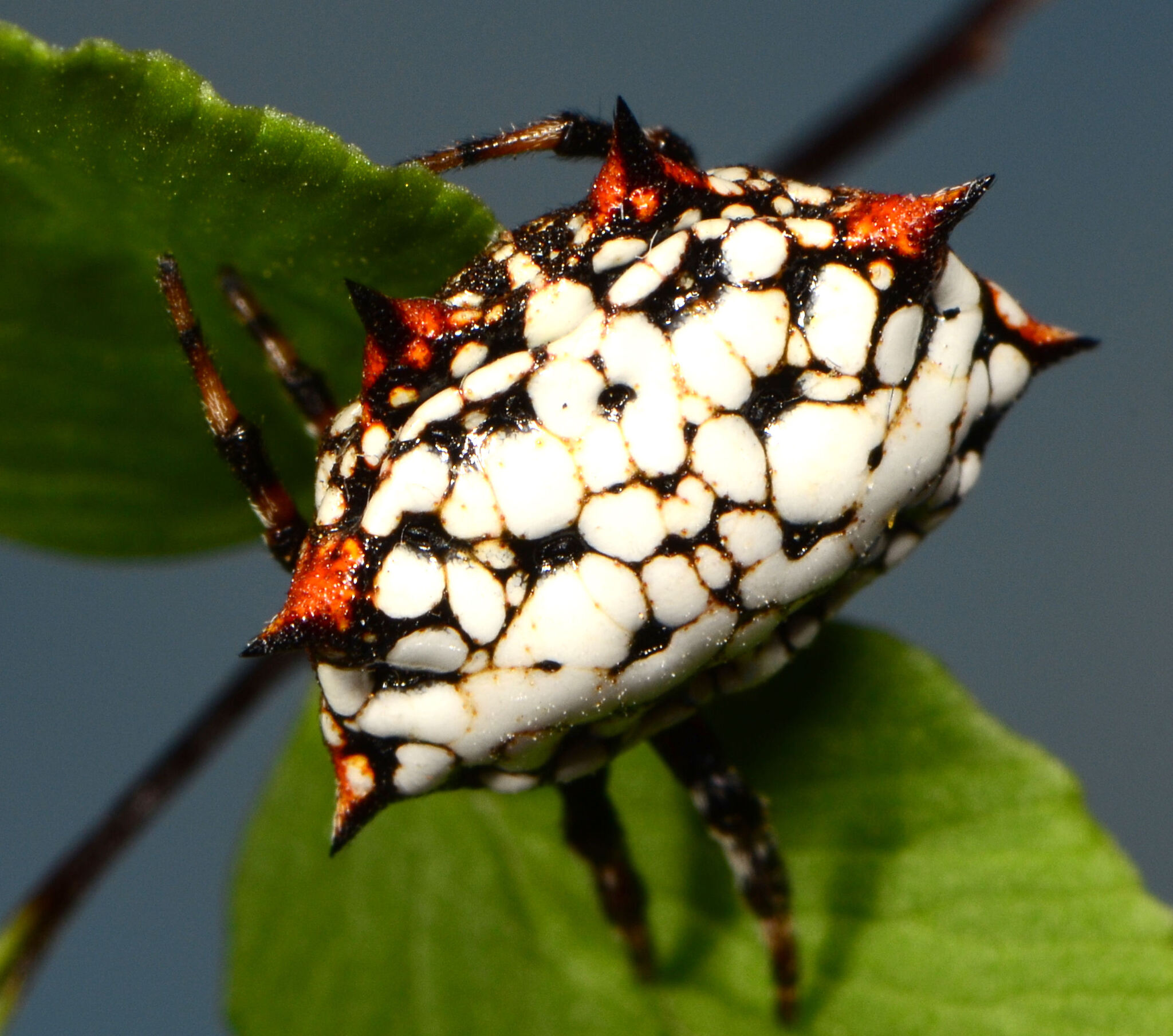

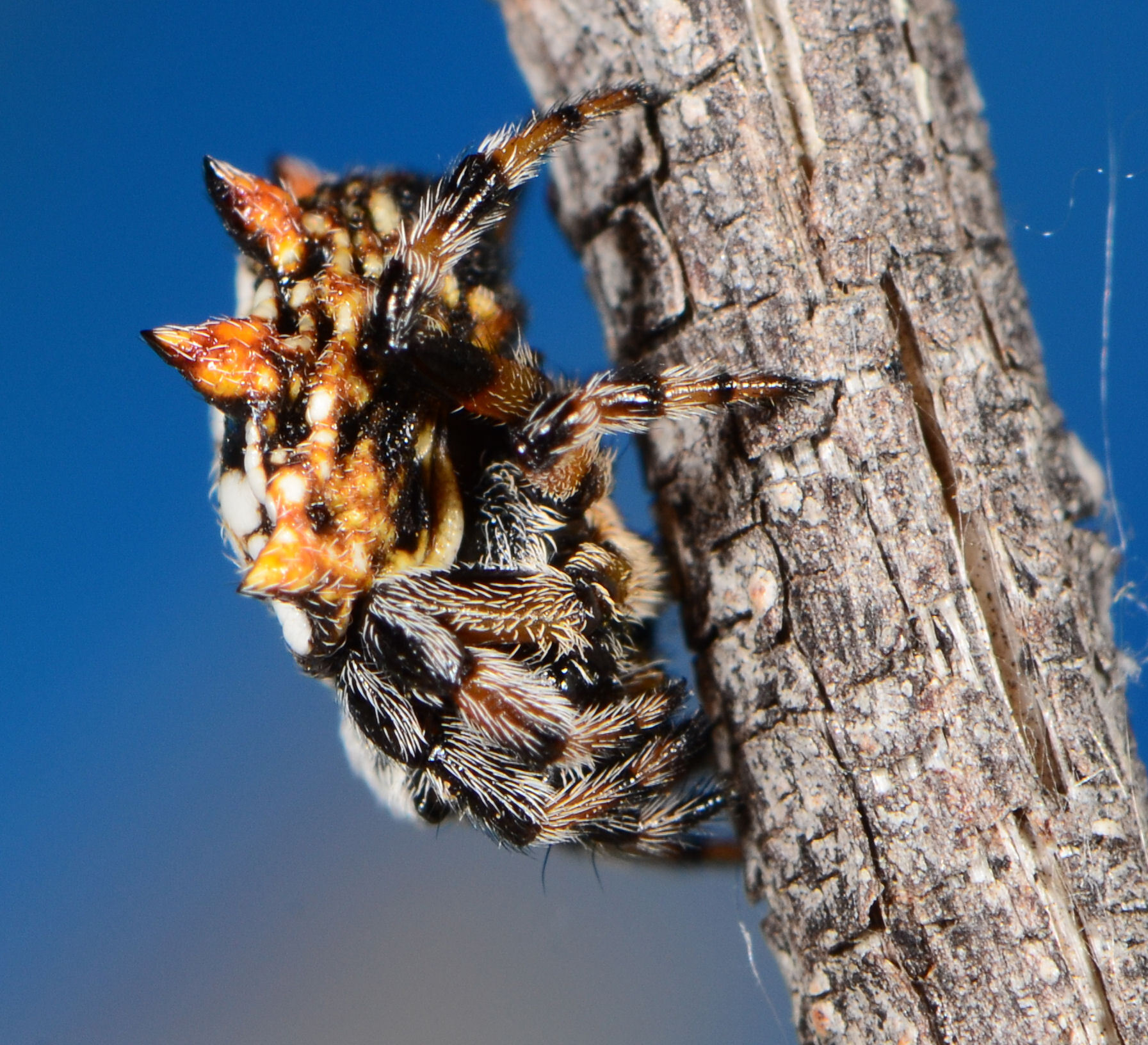

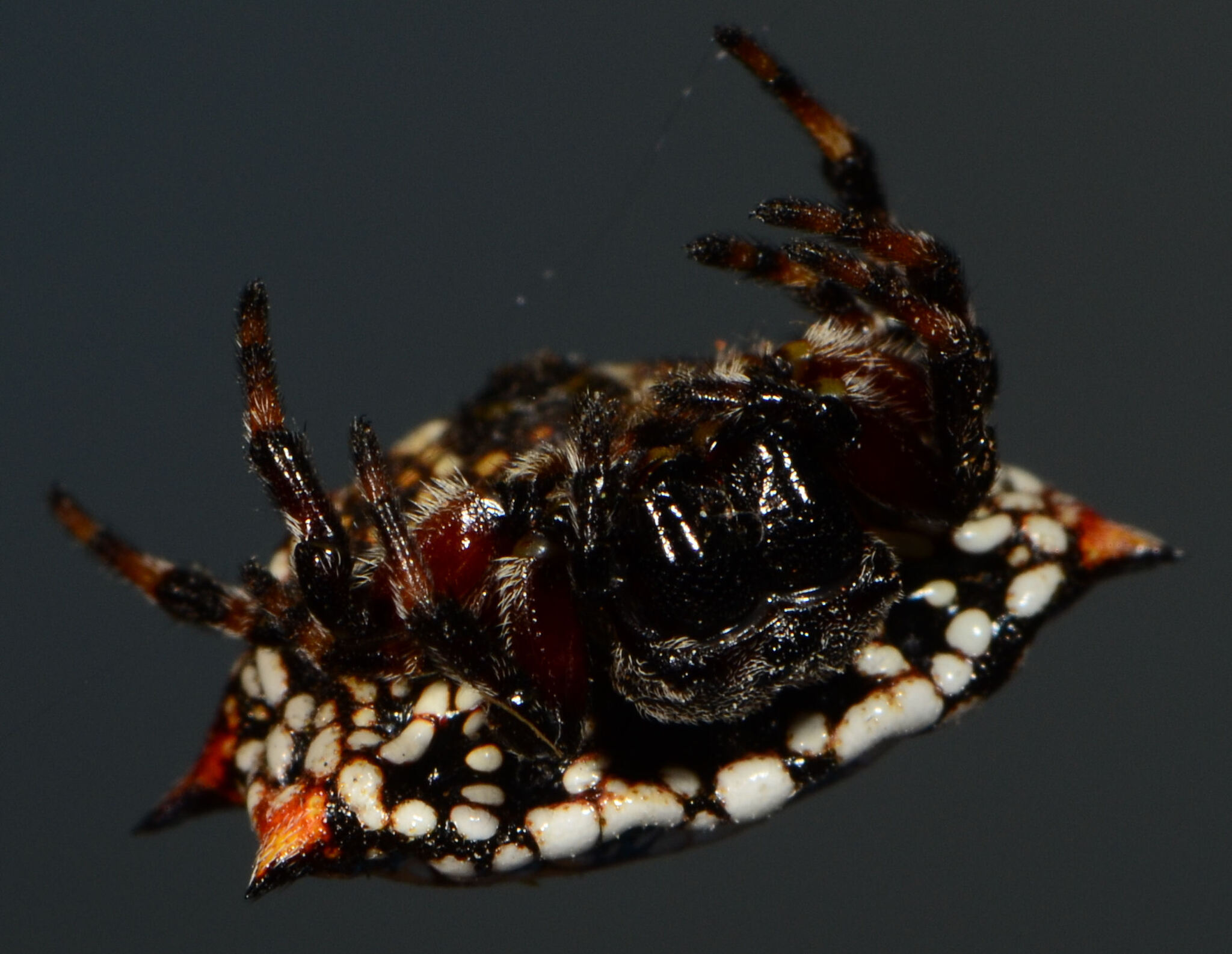

== Conservation ==
Isoxya mossamedensis is listed as Least Concern by the South African National Biodiversity Institute despite being rare. The species is protected in the Aardvark Nature Reserve.

== Taxonomy ==
The species was originally described by Pierre L. G. Benoit in 1962 from Angola. Male identification remains problematic, with the species being known primarily from female specimens.
