= Isoxya mucronata =

Mucronata Box Kite Spider

Conservation status
- Least Concern (SANBI Red List)

Scientific classification
- Kingdom: Animalia
- Phylum: Arthropoda
- Subphylum: Chelicerata
- Class: Arachnida
- Order: Araneae
- Infraorder: Araneomorphae
- Family: Araneidae
- Genus: Isoxya
- Species: I. mucronata

Binomial name
- Isoxya mucronata (Walckenaer, 1841)

Synonyms
- Plectana mucronata Walckenaer, 1841; Gasteracantha tuberosa Thorell, 1859; Gasteracantha purpurea Simon, 1884

Species of spider

Isoxya mucronata is a species of spider in the family Araneidae. It is found in Africa and is commonly known as the Mucronata box kite spider.

== Distribution ==
Isoxya mucronata is found in Sudan, Democratic Republic of the Congo, and South Africa. In South Africa, the species is known from the provinces of KwaZulu-Natal and Limpopo.

== Habitat and ecology ==
The species has been sampled from Forest, Grassland and Savanna biomes at altitudes ranging from 416 to 1,507 m above sea level.

The species makes orb-webs between vegetation. The web is usually decorated with silk tufts.

== Conservation ==
Isoxya mucronata is listed as Least Concern by the South African National Biodiversity Institute due to its wide geographical range. The species is protected in Oribi Gorge Nature Reserve and Kruger National Park.

== Taxonomy ==
The species was originally described by Charles Athanase Walckenaer in 1841 as Plectana mucronata from the Democratic Republic of the Congo. It was later transferred to the genus Isoxya by Benoit in 1962. Both male and female specimens are known.
