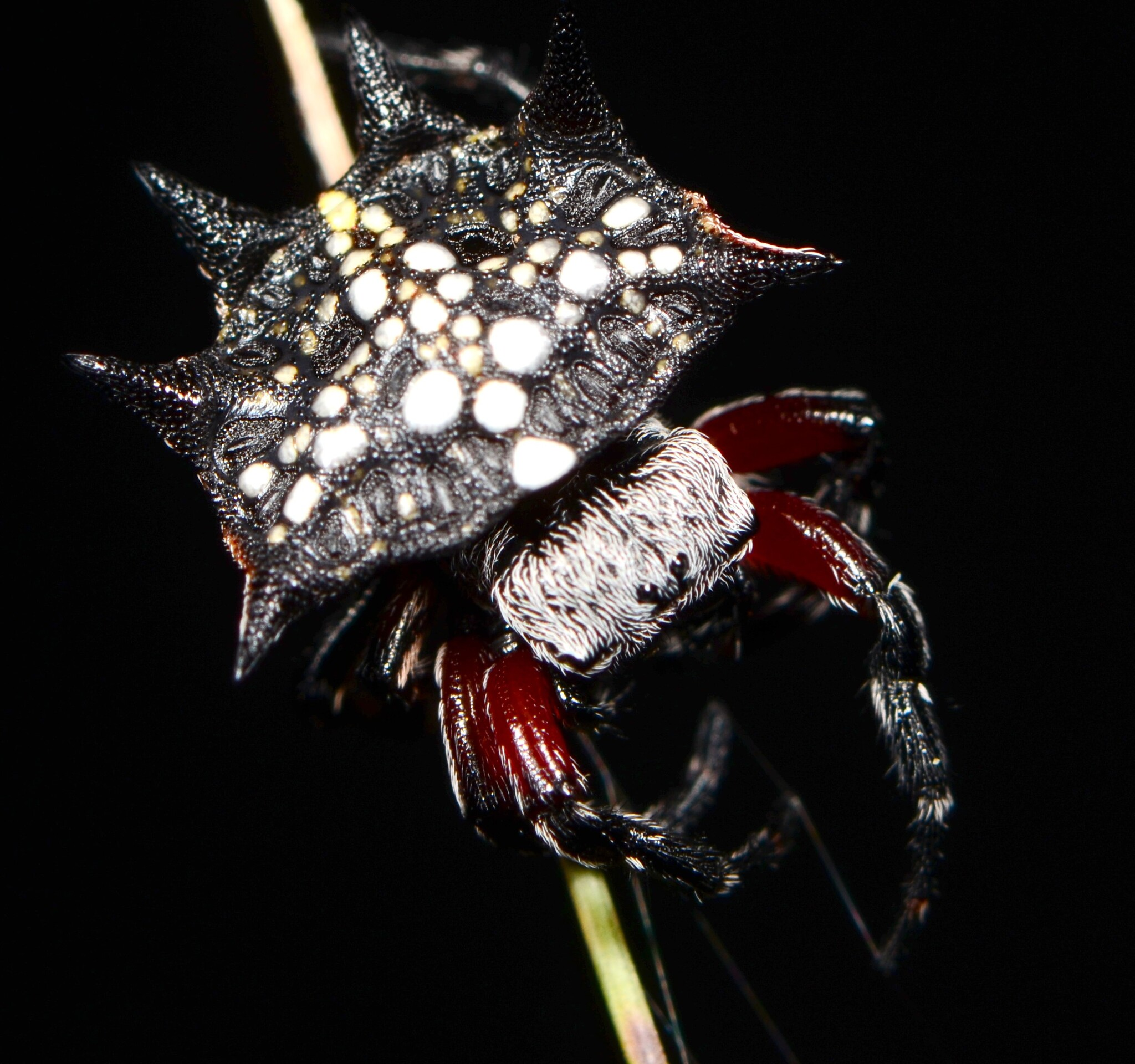
- female
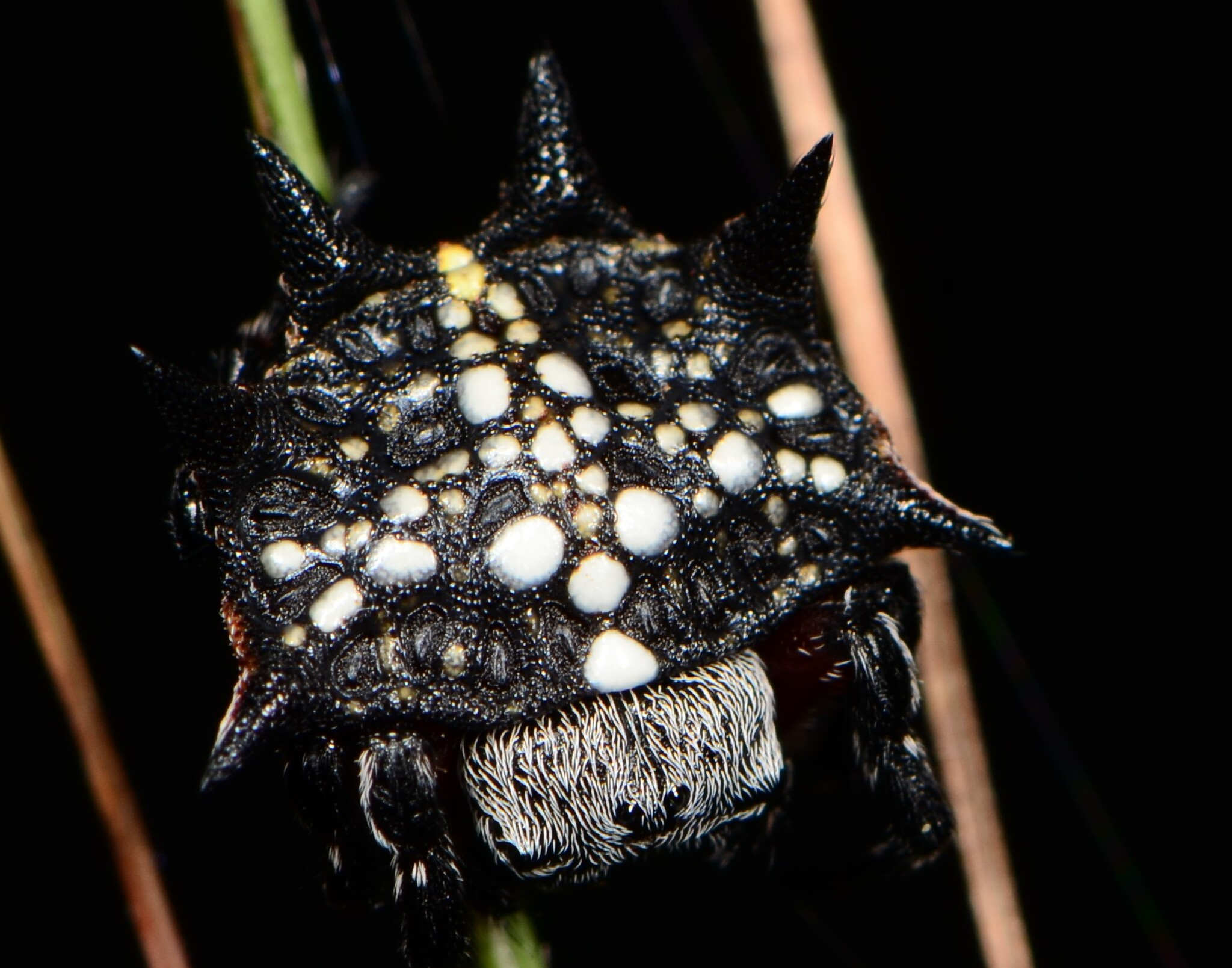
- female

Scientific classification
- Kingdom: Animalia
- Phylum: Arthropoda
- Subphylum: Chelicerata
- Class: Arachnida
- Order: Araneae
- Infraorder: Araneomorphae
- Family: Araneidae
- Genus: Isoxya
- Species: I. cicatricosa

Binomial name
- Isoxya cicatricosa (C. L. Koch, 1844)

Synonyms
- Gasteracantha cicatricosa C. L. Koch, 1844; Isacantha hildebrandti Karsch, 1878; Gasteracantha wealii O. Pickard-Cambridge, 1879; Gasteracantha proba O. Pickard-Cambridge, 1879; Gasteracantha pygmaea Bösenberg & Lenz, 1895; Gasteracantha sanguinipes Strand, 1906; Gasteracantha tubifera Dahl, 1914

= Isoxya cicatricosa =

Black and White Box Kite Spider

Species of spider

Isoxya cicatricosa is a species of spider in the family Araneidae. It is found throughout Africa and is commonly known as the black and white box kite spider.

== Distribution ==
Isoxya cicatricosa has a wide distribution across Central, East, and Southern Africa, as well as Yemen. In South Africa, the species is recorded from six provinces, Eastern Cape, KwaZulu-Natal, Limpopo, Mpumalanga, Northern Cape, and Western Cape.

== Habitat and ecology ==
The species inhabits multiple biomes including Forest, Fynbos, Grassland, Indian Ocean Coastal Belt, Nama Karoo, Savanna, Succulent Karoo and Thicket at altitudes ranging from 5 to 2,799 m above sea level.

During the day, the species can be found in large orb-webs typically made high up between trees. The web is usually decorated with silk tufts. This is an orb-web spider.

== Description ==
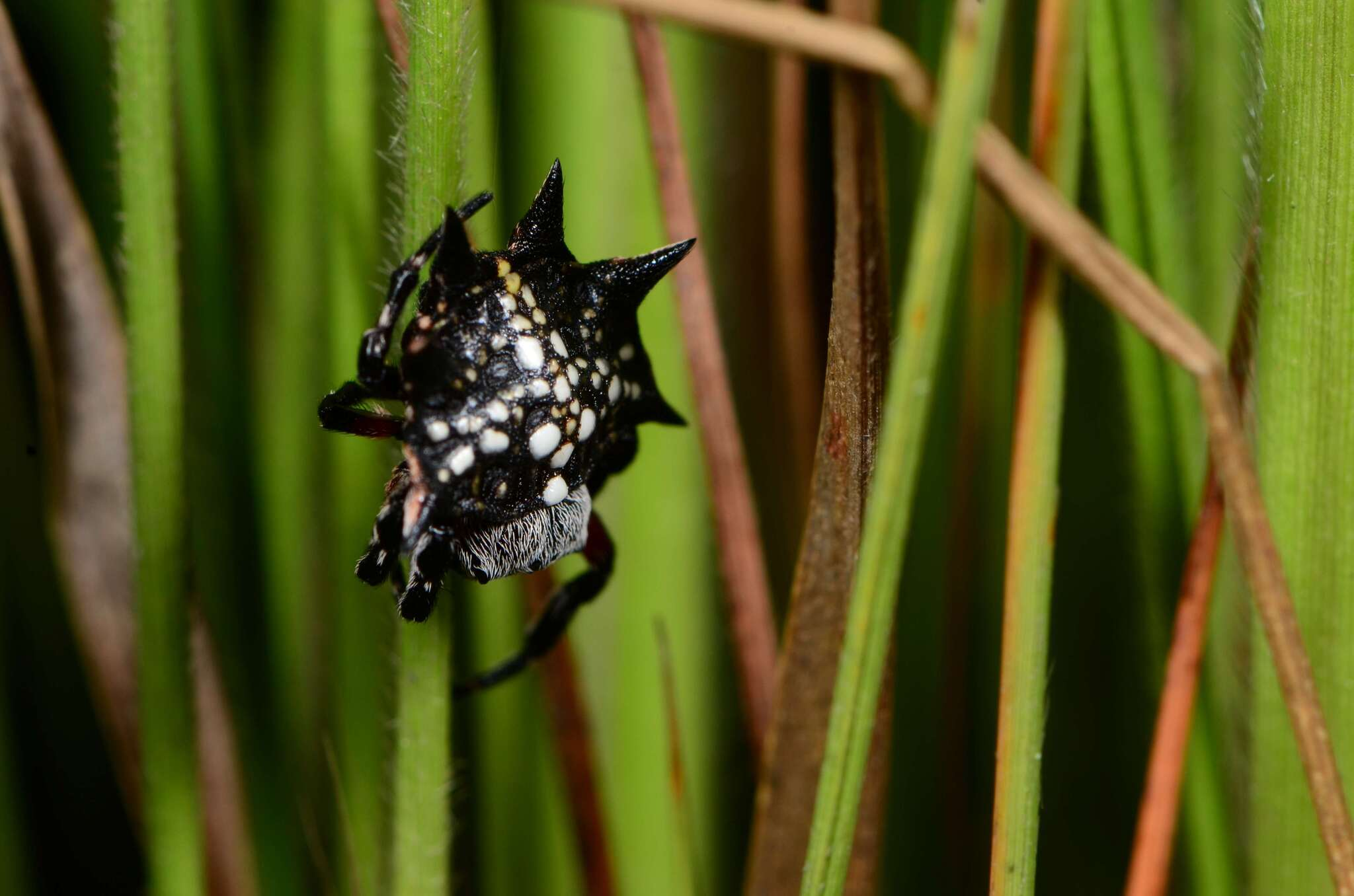
female

== Conservation ==
Isoxya cicatricosa is listed as Least Concern by the South African National Biodiversity Institute due to its wide geographical range across multiple countries and provinces. The species is protected in more than 15 protected areas including Addo Elephant National Park, De Hoop Nature Reserve, Karoo National Park, and Table Mountain National Park.

== Taxonomy ==
The species was originally described by Carl Ludwig Koch in 1844 as Gasteracantha cicatricosa from Ethiopia. It was later transferred to the genus Isoxya by Benoit in 1962. The species has a complex taxonomic history with numerous synonyms that were consolidated over time. Both male and female specimens are known.
