= Isoxya yatesi =

Scientific classification
- Kingdom: Animalia
- Phylum: Arthropoda
- Subphylum: Chelicerata
- Class: Arachnida
- Order: Araneae
- Infraorder: Araneomorphae
- Family: Araneidae
- Genus: Isoxya
- Species: I. yatesi

Binomial name
- Isoxya yatesi Emerit, 1973

Species of spider

Isoxya yatesi is a species of spider in the family Araneidae. It is endemic to South Africa.

== Distribution ==
Isoxya yatesi is endemic to South Africa, where it has been recorded from two provinces: KwaZulu-Natal and Limpopo.

== Habitat and ecology ==
The species has been recorded from Savanna, Grassland and Bushveld biomes at altitudes ranging from 353 to 1,407 m above sea level.

During the day, the species can be found in large orb-webs usually made high between trees.

== Conservation ==
Isoxya yatesi is listed as Data Deficient for taxonomic reasons. The species is rare and undercollected, requiring additional sampling to collect male specimens and determine the species' full range. The species is protected in Atherstone Nature Reserve and Wolkberg Nature Reserve.

== Taxonomy ==
The species was originally described by Michel Emerit in 1973 from Pinetown. The species is known only from female specimens, with no males having been collected or described.
