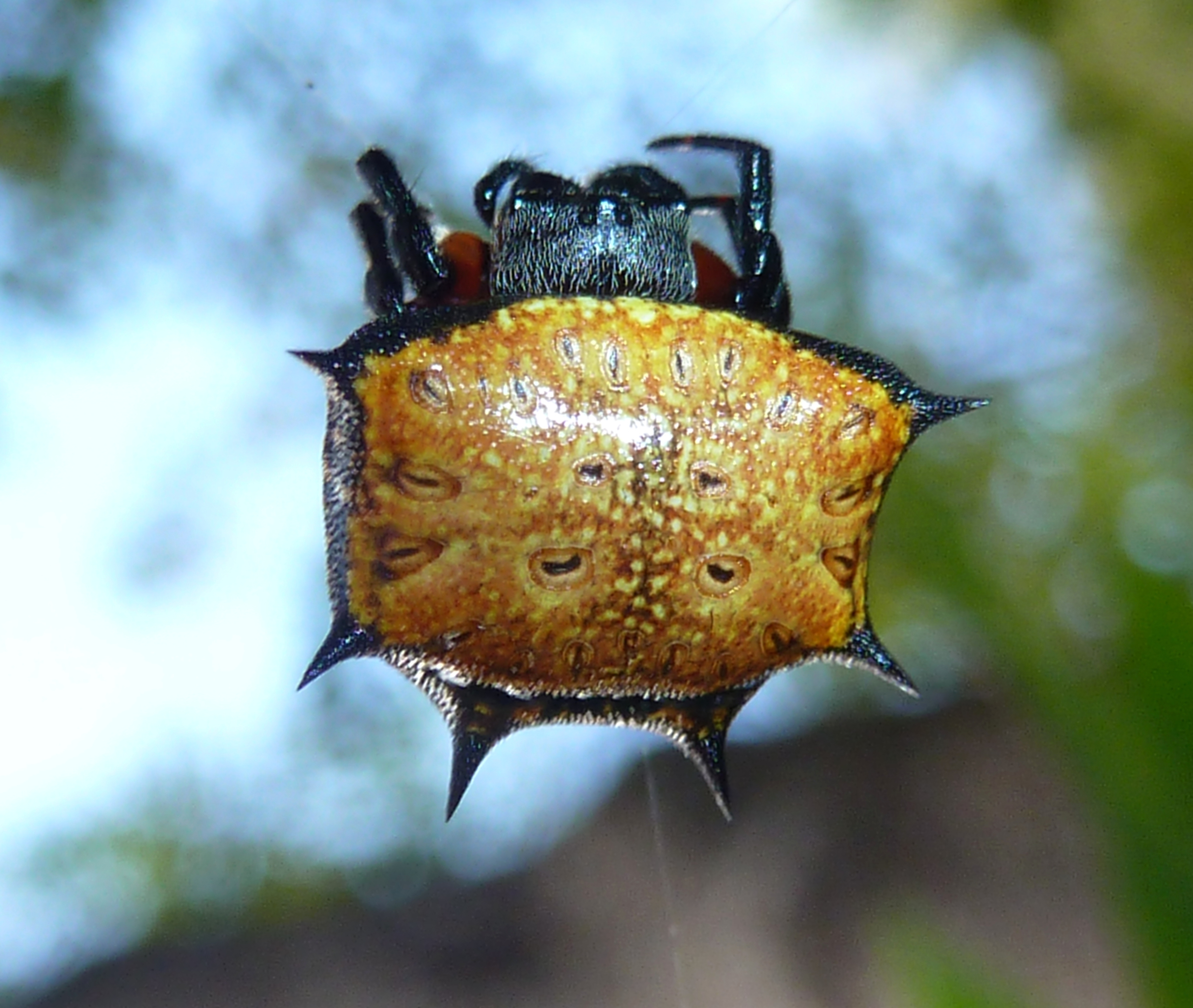
- I. tabulata
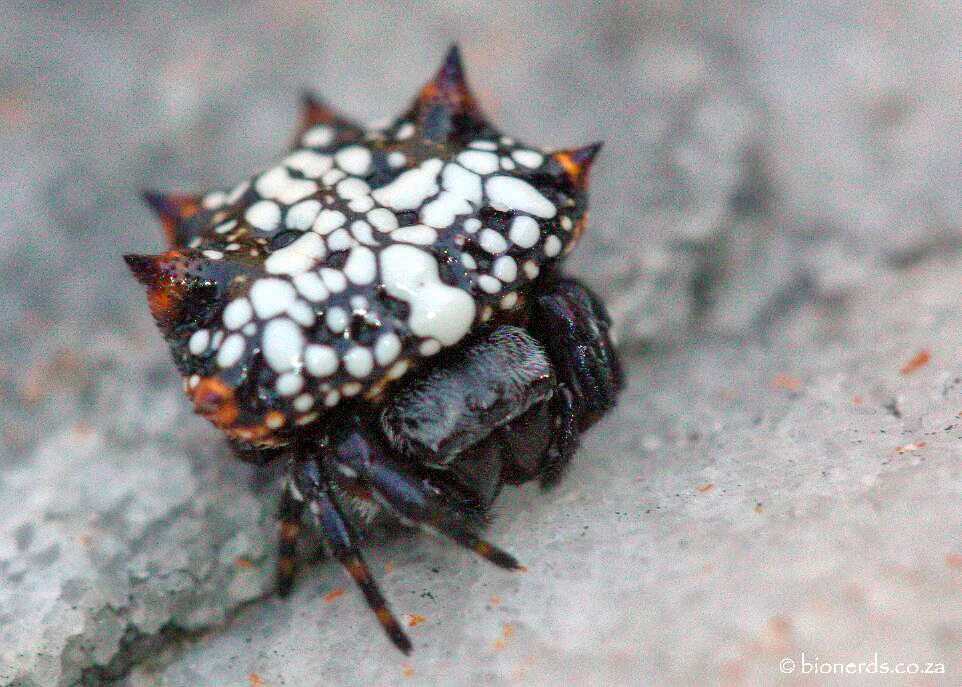
- I. cicatricosa

Scientific classification
- Kingdom: Animalia
- Phylum: Arthropoda
- Subphylum: Chelicerata
- Class: Arachnida
- Order: Araneae
- Infraorder: Araneomorphae
- Family: Araneidae
- Genus: Isoxya; Simon, 1885

Type species
- I. cicatricosa (C. L. Koch, 1844)

Species
- 17, see text

= Box kite spider =

Box kite spiders

Genus of spiders

Box kite spiders (Isoxya) is a genus of Afrotropical orb-weaver spiders first described by Eugène Simon in 1885. Like the spiny orb-weavers they have six prominent (but short) spines on their abdomen. They are small spiders, measuring 3 to 7 millimetres (0.12 to 0.28 in) across. Isoxya have a sclerotised (or porcelain-like) abdomen which is typical of the Gasteracanthinae.

== Description ==
These spiders have a carapace that is usually as wide as it is long. Their abdomen is brightly decorated with yellow, red or black and white patterns. The dorsal part is hardened to form a rigid scutum bearing large spots and depressions, often prolonged laterally and posteriorly in spine-like extensions.

The spinnerets are surrounded by a sclerotised ring. Legs are relatively short. The eight eyes are in two rows (4:4). Males are much smaller than females and differ in color and shape.

== Lifestyle ==
During the day box kite spiders can be found in large orb-webs usually made high between trees. The web is usually decorated with small silk tufts. The egg sacs are covered with silk and they attach it to vegetation.

== Species ==
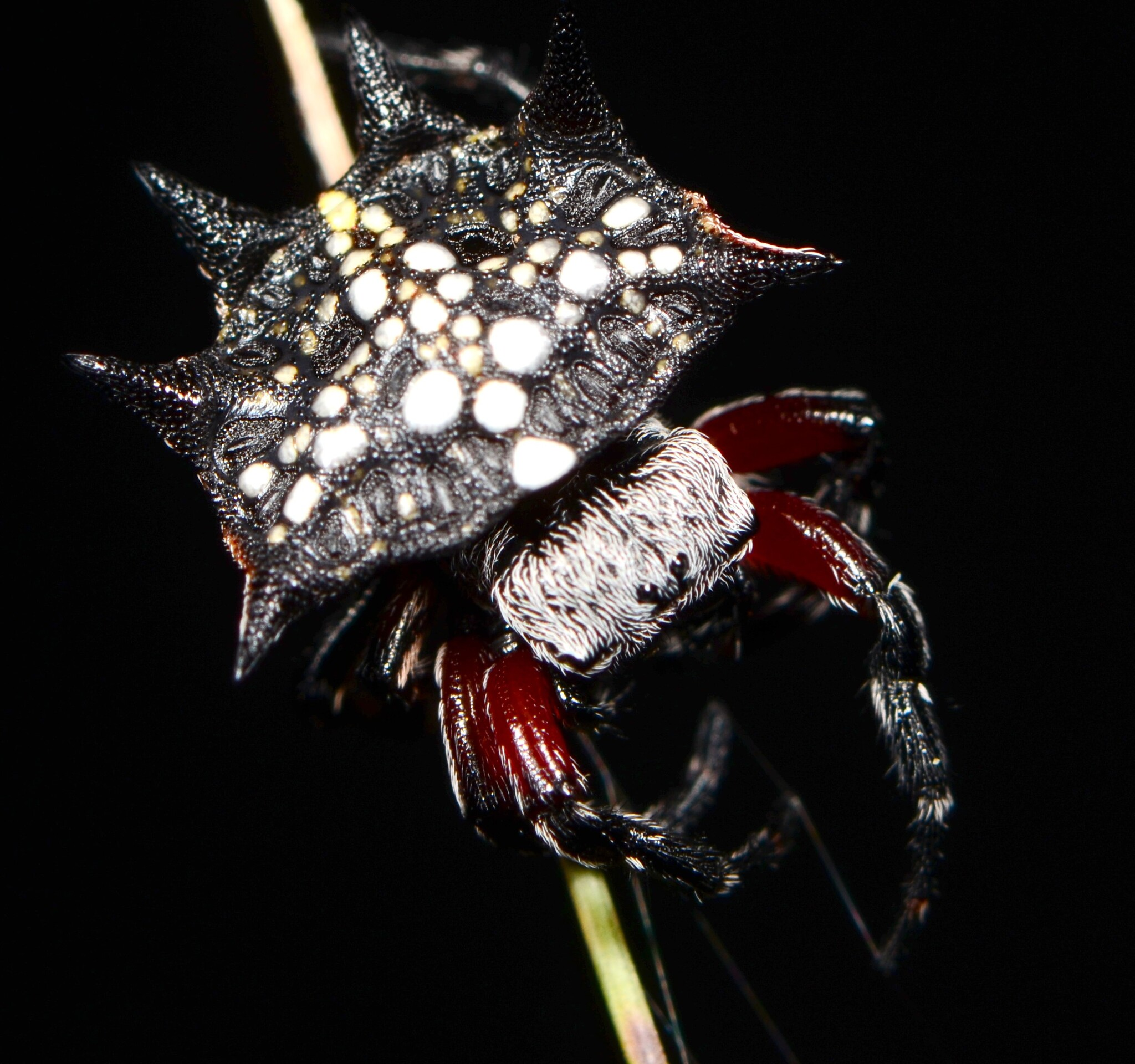
I. cicatrosa

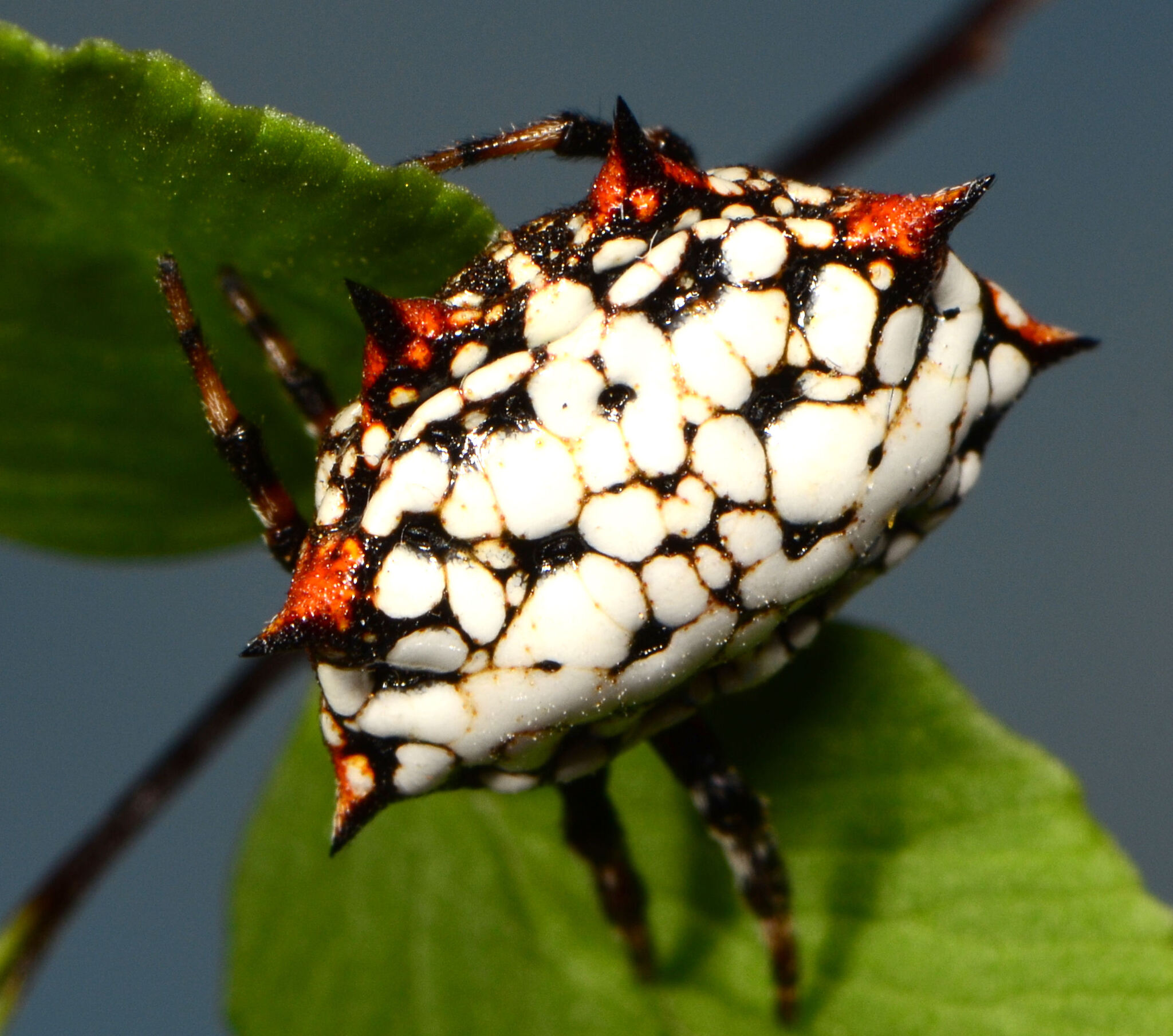
I. mossamedensis

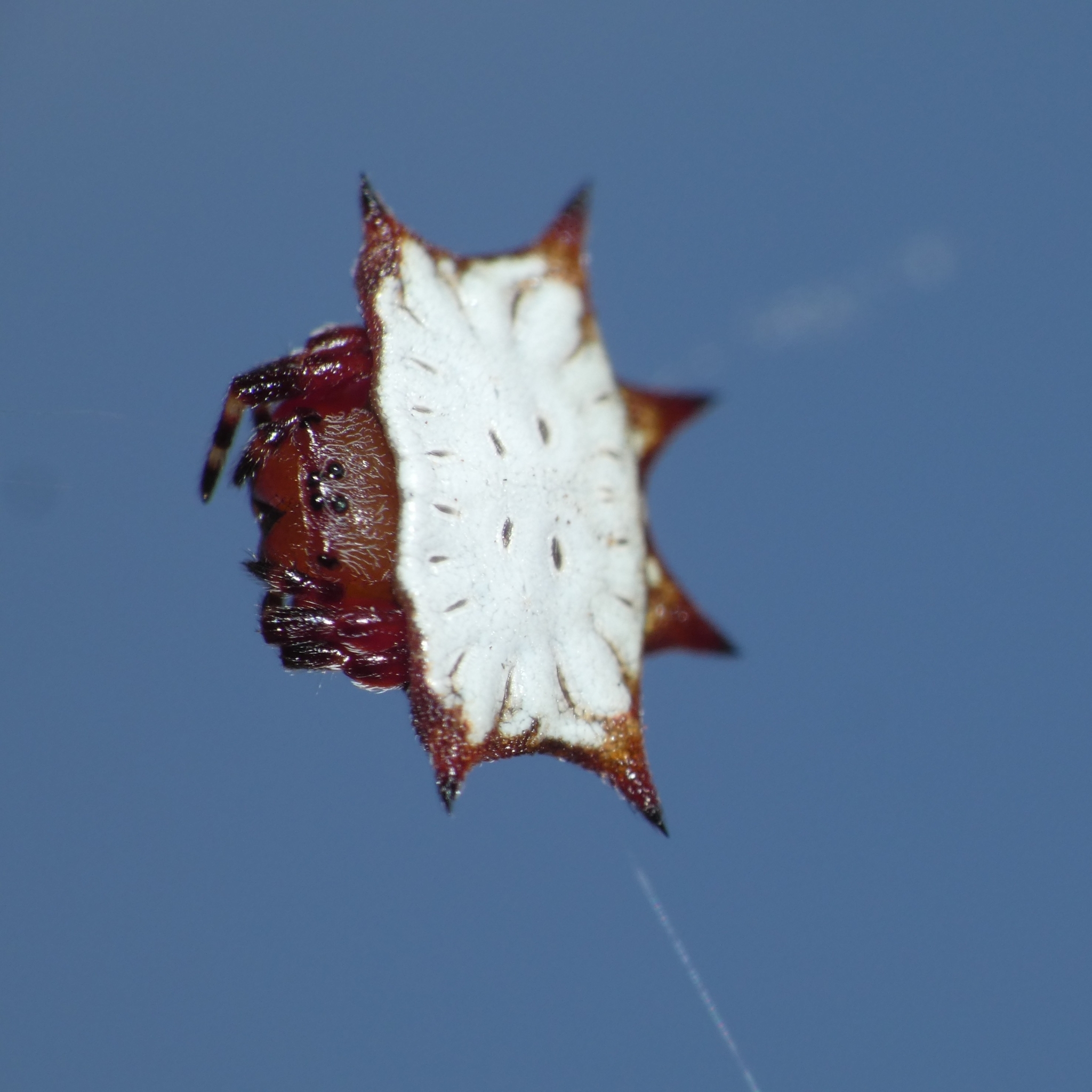
I. stuhlmanni

As of November 2026, this genus includes seventeen species:

- Isoxya basilewskyi Benoit & Emerit, 1975 – Rwanda, DR Congo
- Isoxya cicatricosa (C. L. Koch, 1844) – Central, East, Southern Africa, Yemen (type species)
- Isoxya cowani (Butler, 1883) – Madagascar
- Isoxya kochi (O. Pickard-Cambridge, 1877) – West, Central, East Africa
- Isoxya mahafalensis Emerit, 1974 – Madagascar
- Isoxya manangona Agnarsson, Starrett, Babbitz, Bond, Gregorič, Raberahona, Williams & Kuntner, 2023 – Madagascar
- Isoxya milloti Emerit, 1974 – Madagascar
- Isoxya mossamedensis Benoit, 1962 – Angola, South Africa
- Isoxya mucronata (Walckenaer, 1841) – Sudan, DR Congo, South Africa
- Isoxya nigromutica (Caporiacco, 1939) – East Africa
- Isoxya reuteri (Lenz, 1886) – Madagascar
- Isoxya semiflava Simon, 1887 – West, Central Africa
- Isoxya somalica (Caporiacco, 1940) – Somalia
- Isoxya stuhlmanni (Bösenberg & Lenz, 1895) – DR Congo, Rwanda, Tanzania, Mozambique, South Africa, Eswatini
- Isoxya tabulata (Thorell, 1859) – DR Congo, Malawi, Tanzania, Angola, Zimbabwe, Mozambique, South Africa, Eswatini
- Isoxya testudinaria (Simon, 1901) – West, Central, East Africa
- Isoxya yatesi Emerit, 1973 – South Africa
