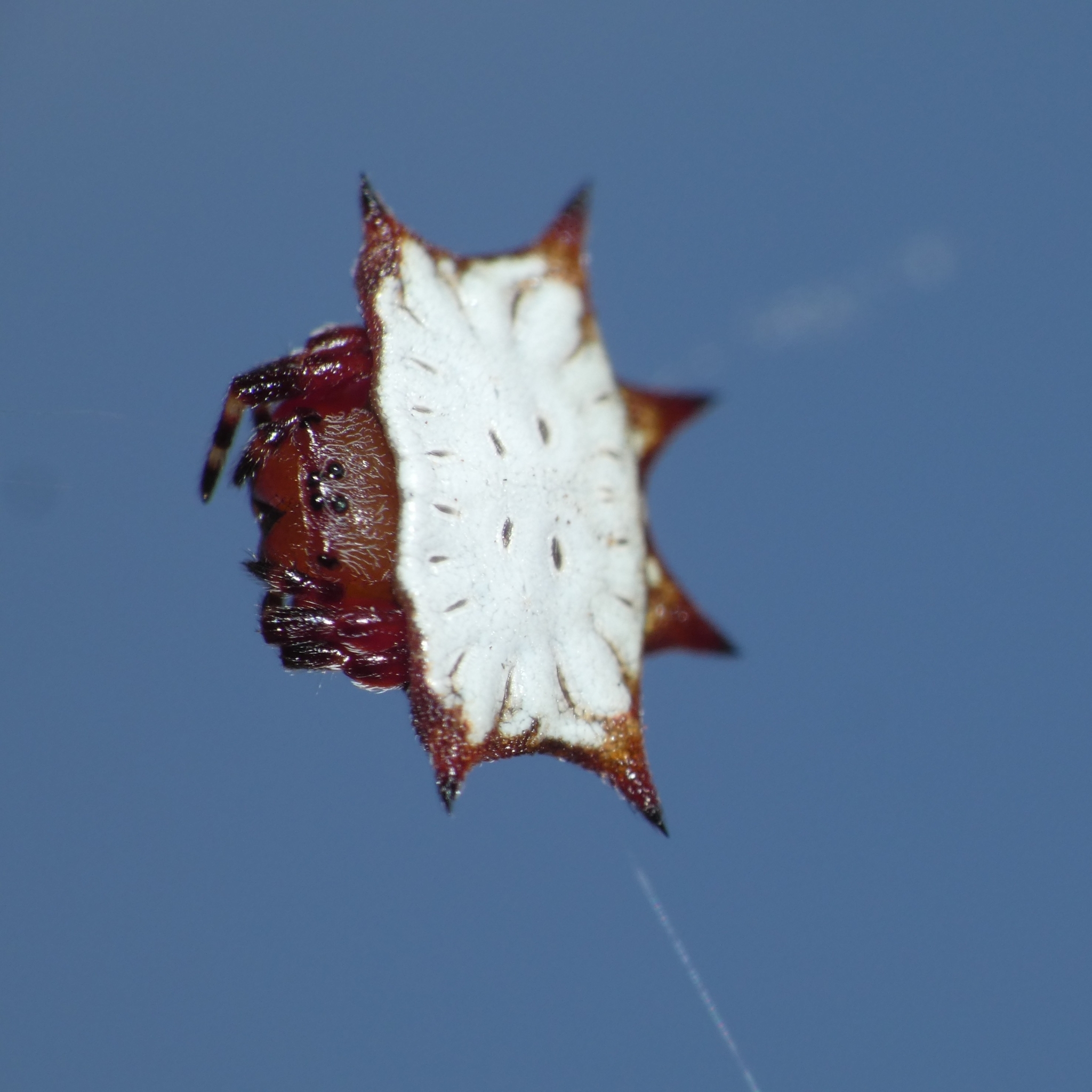

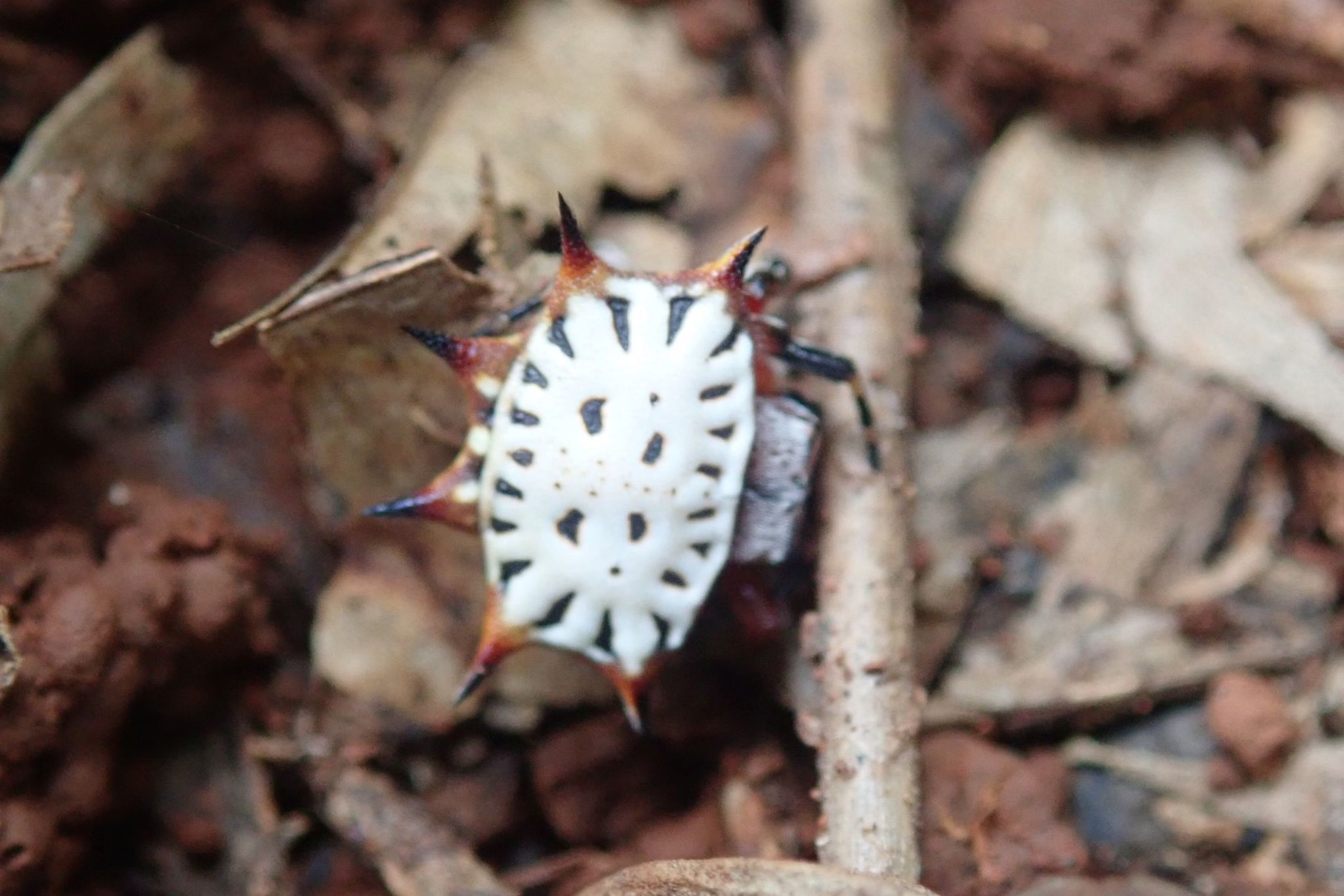

Scientific classification
- Kingdom: Animalia
- Phylum: Arthropoda
- Subphylum: Chelicerata
- Class: Arachnida
- Order: Araneae
- Infraorder: Araneomorphae
- Family: Araneidae
- Genus: Isoxya
- Species: I. stuhlmanni

Binomial name
- Isoxya stuhlmanni (Bösenberg & Lenz, 1895)

Synonyms
- Gasteracantha stuhlmanni Bösenberg & Lenz, 1895

= Isoxya stuhlmanni =

Spotted Isoxya Box Kite Spider

Species of spider

Isoxya stuhlmanni is a species of spider in the family Araneidae. It is found in Africa and is commonly known as the spotted Isoxya box kite spider.

== Distribution ==
Isoxya stuhlmanni is found in Democratic Republic of the Congo, Rwanda, Tanzania, Mozambique, South Africa, and Eswatini. In South Africa, the species is recorded from five provinces, Eastern Cape, Free State, KwaZulu-Natal, Limpopo, and Mpumalanga.

== Habitat and ecology ==
The species has been sampled from Forest, Grassland, Indian Ocean Coastal Belt, Savanna and Thicket biomes at altitudes ranging from 13 to 1,902 m above sea level.

During the day, the species can be found in large orb-webs typically made high between trees. They were sampled in high numbers in coastal forests at Richards Bay, where webs were constructed 1-2 m above ground between plants, with individual webs often abutting.

== Description ==
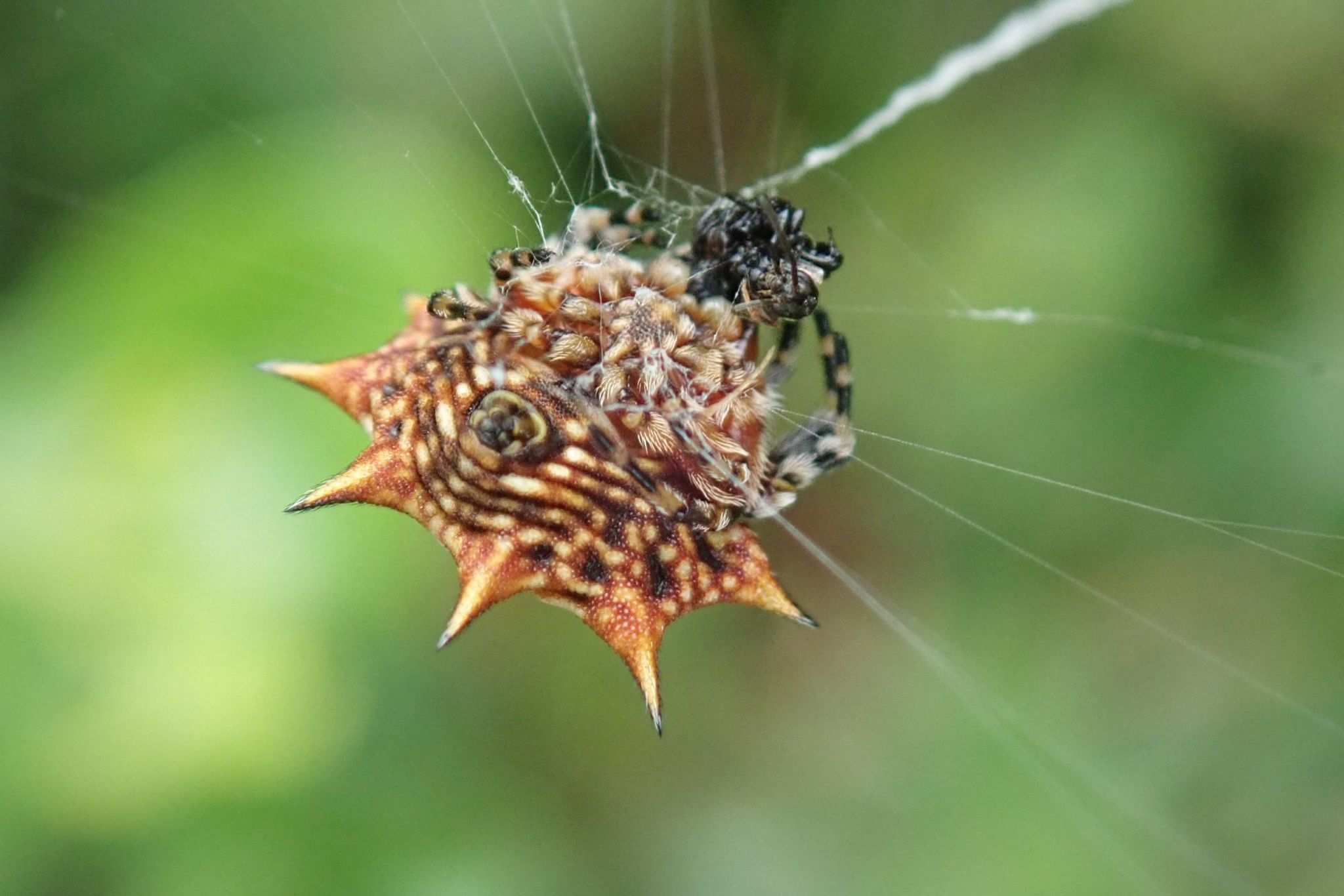
from below

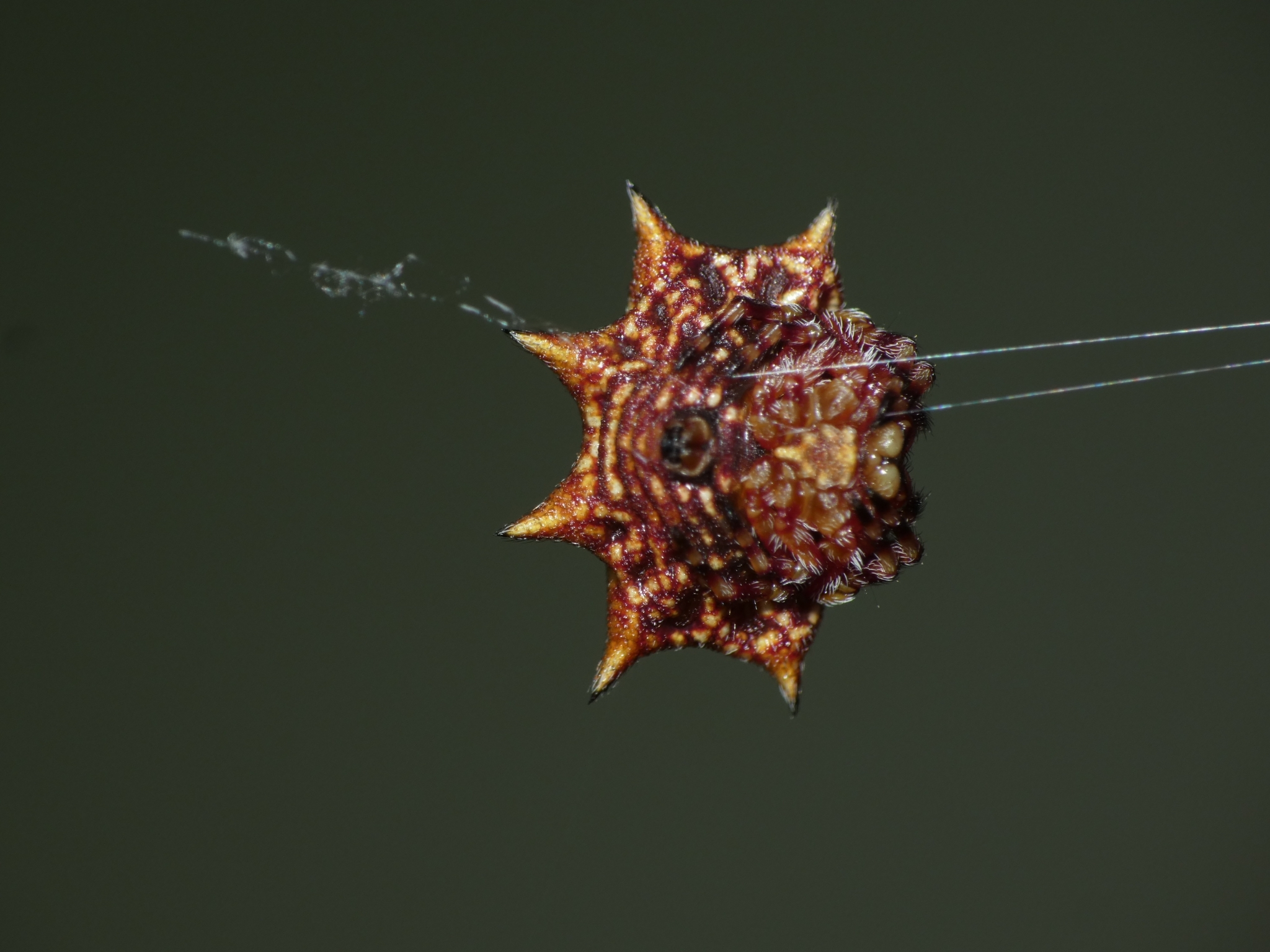

== Conservation ==
Isoxya stuhlmanni is listed as Least Concern by the South African National Biodiversity Institute due to its wide geographical range. The species is protected in eight protected areas.

== Etymology ==
The species is named after German naturalist Franz Stuhlmann (1863-1928).

== Taxonomy ==
The species was originally described by Friedrich Wilhelm Bösenberg and Heinrich Lenz in 1895 as Gasteracantha stuhlmanni from the Democratic Republic of the Congo. It was later transferred to the genus Isoxya by Benoit in 1962. The species is known only from females, with male identification remaining problematic.
