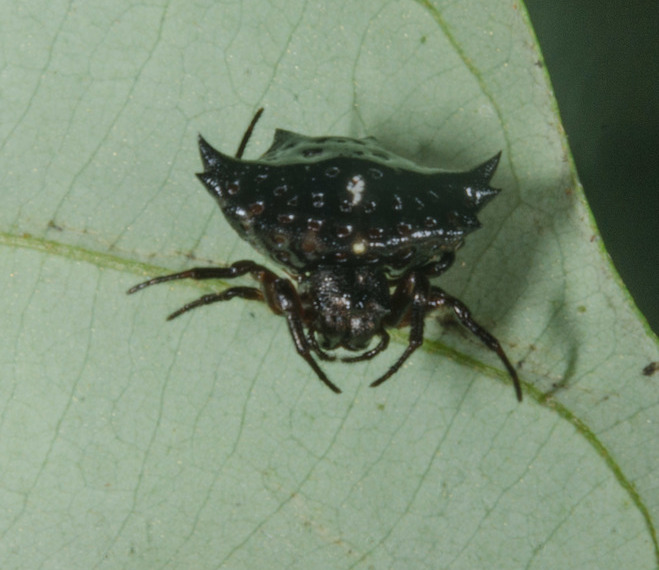
- G. krausi
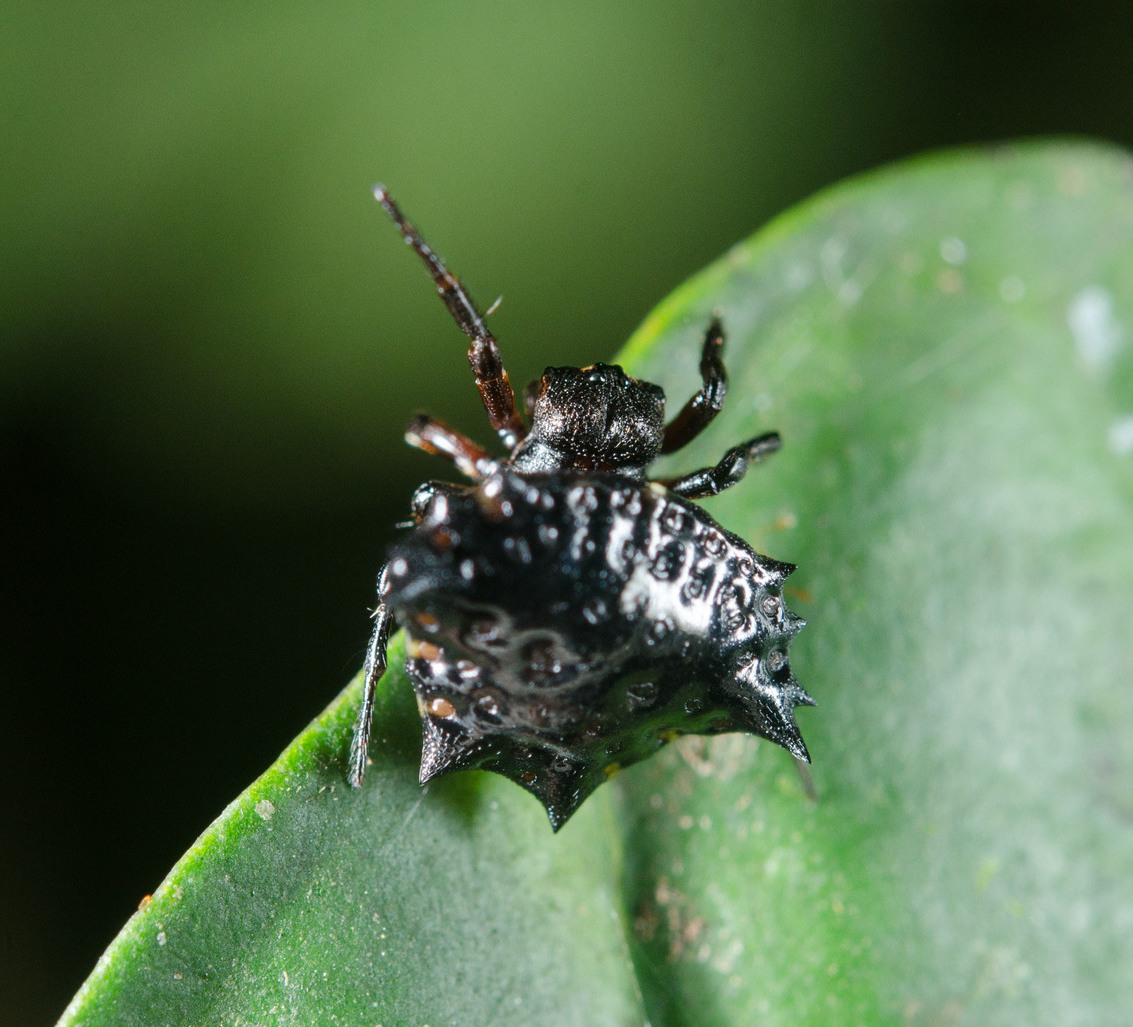
- G. krausi

Scientific classification
- Kingdom: Animalia
- Phylum: Arthropoda
- Subphylum: Chelicerata
- Class: Arachnida
- Order: Araneae
- Infraorder: Araneomorphae
- Family: Araneidae
- Genus: Gastroxya; Benoit, 1962

Type species
- G. schoutedeni Benoit, 1962

Species
- 4, see text

= Gastroxya =

Genus of spiders

Gastroxya is a genus of African orb-weaver spiders first described by Belgian arachnologist Pierre L.G. Benoit in 1962.

== Description ==
The carapace of spiders in this genus is wider than it is long and is covered by white setae, with a longitudinal fovea.

The eyes are arranged in two rows, with the lateral eyes closely spaced near the lateral edge of the carapace. The cheliceral furrow contains two rows of teeth, and the sternum has a curved tip. The dorsum of the abdomen features a double row of 18 marginal sigilla, while four sigilla form a trapezoid medially with an additional double row on the posterior border, and the ventral surface lacks protuberances.

The epigyne consists of a longitudinal crest that is flanked by two deep round indentations. The femur of the male palp bears a strong tooth at its base.

== Species ==
As of November 2026, this genus includes four species:

- Gastroxya benoiti Emerit, 1973 – South Africa
- Gastroxya krausi Benoit, 1962 – Liberia, DR Congo
- Gastroxya leleupi Benoit, 1962 – Congo
- Gastroxya schoutedeni Benoit, 1962 – Congo, Rwanda, Burundi (type species)
