= Gastroxya benoiti =

Scientific classification
- Kingdom: Animalia
- Phylum: Arthropoda
- Subphylum: Chelicerata
- Class: Arachnida
- Order: Araneae
- Infraorder: Araneomorphae
- Family: Araneidae
- Genus: Gastroxya
- Species: G. benoiti

Binomial name
- Gastroxya benoiti Emerit, 1973

Species of spider

Gastroxya benoiti is a species of spider in the family Araneidae. The species is a South African endemic with a very restricted distribution.

== Distribution ==
Gastroxya benoiti is known only from South Africa. The species has a restricted distribution and is known only from two specimens collected in the Eastern Cape and KwaZulu-Natal provinces. The type locality is Port St Johns.

The known localities are Durban in KwaZulu-Natal and Port St. Johns (Mouth of the Umgazi) in Eastern Cape.

== Habitat and ecology ==
Nothing is known about the life style of this species.

== Conservation ==
Gastroxya benoiti is listed as Data Deficient for taxonomic reasons. The species is rare and under-collected. More sampling is needed to collect the male and to determine the species' range.

== Etymology ==
Gastroxya benoiti is named after Belgian arachnologist Pierre L. G. Benoit, who erected the genus Gastroxya and described the three other species.

== Taxonomy ==
The species has not been revised and is known only from the female.
