= List of spider species of Madagascar =

This is a list of spider species that occur on Madagascar. Unless otherwise noted, they are endemic (they occur nowhere else). Some cosmopolitan or pantropical species that occur also in Madagascar may be missing.

== Araneidae ==
- Acantharachne giltayi Lessert, 1938 — also Congo
- Acantharachne madecassa Emerit, 2000
- Acantharachne milloti Emerit, 2000
- Acrosomoides acrosomoides (O. P.-Cambridge, 1879)
- Arachnura scorpionoides Vinson, 1863 — also Congo, Ethiopia, Mauritius
- Araneus isabella (Vinson, 1863)
- Araneus kraepelini (Lenz, 1891)
- Araneus lenzi (Roewer, 1942)
- Araneus madagascaricus (Strand, 1908)
- Araneus margitae (Strand, 1917)
- Araneus nossibeus (Strand, 1907)
- Araneus pallescens (Lenz, 1891)
- Araneus saccalava (Strand, 1907)
- Araneus sambava (Strand, 1907)
- Argiope coquereli (Vinson, 1863) — also Zanzibar
- Argiope ranomafanensis Bjørn, 1997
- Augusta glyphica (Guérin, 1839)
- Caerostris cowani (Butler, 1882)
- Caerostris darwini (Agnarsson, Kuntner & Blackledge, 2010)
- Caerostris ecclesiigera (Butler, 1882)
- Caerostris extrusa (Butler, 1882)
- Caerostris hirsuta (Simon, 1895)
- Caerostris mitralis (Vinson, 1863) — also Central Africa
- Caerostris sexcuspidata (Fabricius, 1793) — also Africa, Comoro Islands, Aldabra
- Chorizopes antongilensis Emerit, 1997
- Chorizopes casictones Kallal & Hormiga, 2019
- Chorizopes madagascariensis Emerit, 1997
- Clitaetra perroti Simon, 1894
- Coelossia trituberculata Simon, 1903 — also Mauritius
- Cyclosa hova Strand, 1907
- Cyclosa sanctibenedicti (Vinson, 1863) — also Réunion
- Cyphalonotus columnifer Simon, 1903
- Cyrtarachne madagascariensis Emerit, 2000
- Cyrtarachne ixoides (Simon, 1870) — also Mediterranean to Georgia
- Exechocentrus lancearius Simon, 1889
- Exechocentrus madilina Scharff & Hormiga, 2012
- Gasteracantha rhomboidea madagascariensis Vinson, 1863
- Gasteracantha rufithorax Simon, 1881
- Gasteracantha sanguinolenta andrefanae Emerit, 1974
  - Gasteracantha sanguinolenta bigoti Emerit, 1974
  - Gasteracantha sanguinolenta mangrovae Emerit, 1974
- Gasteracantha thorelli Keyserling, 1864
- Gasteracantha versicolor avaratrae Emerit, 1974
  - Gasteracantha versicolor formosa Vinson, 1863
- Isoxya cowani (Butler, 1882)
- Isoxya mahafalensis Emerit, 1974
- Isoxya milloti Emerit, 1974
- Isoxya reuteri (Lenz, 1886)
- Larinia tamatave (Grasshoff, 1971)
- Madacantha nossibeana (Strand, 1916)
- Nemoscolus waterloti Berland, 1920
- Neoscona angulatula (Schenkel, 1937) — also Aldabra, Kenya
- Neoscona cereolella (Strand, 1907) — also Congo, East Africa
- Neoscona moreli (Vinson, 1863) — also Africa, Seychelles, Réunion, Mauritius; introduced to the Caribbean, Colombia, Venezuela to Argentina
- Neoscona triangula mensamontella (Strand, 1907)
- Nephila inaurata madagascariensis (Vinson, 1863) — also South Africa to Seychelles
- Nephila komaci (Kuntner & Coddington, 2009) — also South Africa
- Nephila pilipes malagassa (Strand, 1907)
- Nephila senegalensis hildebrandti Dahl, 1912
- Nephilingis livida Vinson, 1863 — also Comoros, Mayotte and Seychelles
- Paraplectana walleri (Blackwall, 1865) — also West, Central Africa
- Pararaneus uncivulva (Strand, 1907)
- Parmatergus coccinelloides Emerit, 1994
  - Parmatergus coccinelloides ambrae Emerit, 1994
- Parmatergus lens Emerit, 1994
- Pasilobus antongilensis Emerit, 2000
- Pasilobus capuroni Emerit, 2000
- Poltys kochi Keyserling, 1864 — also Mauritius
- Poltys reuteri Lenz, 1886
- Poltys vesicularis Simon, 1889
- Prasonica albolimbata Simon, 1895 — also Congo
- Prasonica seriata Simon, 1895 — also Africa
- Prasonicella cavipalpis Grasshoff, 1971
- Pronous tetralobus Simon, 1895
- Pycnacantha fuscosa Simon, 1903
- Thelacantha brevispina (Doleschall, 1857) — also India to Philippines, Australia

== Archaeidae ==
- Afrarchaea fisheri Lotz, 2003
- Afrarchaea godfreyi (Hewitt, 1919) — also South Africa
- Afrarchaea mahariraensis Lotz, 2003
- Eriauchenius bourgini (Millot, 1948)
- Eriauchenius jeanneli (Millot, 1948)
- Eriauchenius legendrei (Platnick, 1991)
- Eriauchenius pauliani (Legendre, 1970)
- Eriauchenius ratsirarsoni (Lotz, 2003)
- Eriauchenius tsingyensis (Lotz, 2003)
- Eriauchenius vadoni (Millot, 1948)
- Eriauchenius workmani O. P.-Cambridge, 1881
- Madagascarchaea gracilicollis (Millot, 1948)

== Barychelidae ==
- Idioctis intertidalis (Benoit & Legendre, 1968) — also Seychelles
- Tigidia alluaudi (Simon, 1902)
- Tigidia bastardi (Simon, 1902)
- Tigidia dubia (Strand, 1907)
- Tigidia majori (Pocock, 1903)
- Tigidia mathiauxi (Simon, 1902)
- Tigidia processigera (Strand, 1907)
- Tigidia typica (Strand, 1907)
- Zophoryctes flavopilosus Simon, 1902

== Clubionidae ==
- Carteronius argenticomus (Keyserling, 1877)
- Carteronius vittiger Simon, 1896
- Clubiona hoffmanni Schenkel, 1937

== Corinnidae ==
- Castianeira majungae Simon, 1896
- Cetonana aculifera (Strand, 1916)
- Copa auroplumosa Strand, 1907
- Copa lineata Simon, 1903
- Corinna nossibeensis Strand, 1907
- Orthobula sicca Simon, 1903
- Paccius angulatus Platnick, 2000
- Paccius elevatus Platnick, 2000
- Paccius griswoldi Platnick, 2000
- Paccius madagascariensis (Simon, 1889)
- Paccius mucronatus Simon, 1898
- Paccius quinteri Platnick, 2000
- Paccius scharffi Platnick, 2000

== Ctenidae ==
- Mahafalytenus fo Silva, 2007
- Mahafalytenus fohy Silva, 2007
- Mahafalytenus hafa Silva, 2007
- Mahafalytenus isalo Silva, 2007
- Mahafalytenus osy Silva, 2007
- Mahafalytenus paosy Silva, 2007
- Mahafalytenus tsilo Silva, 2007
- Viridasius fasciatus (Lenz, 1886)
- Vulsor isaloensis (Ono, 1993)
- Vulsor penicillatus Simon, 1896
- Vulsor quartus Strand, 1907
- Vulsor quintus Strand, 1907
- Vulsor septimus Strand, 1907
- Vulsor sextus Strand, 1907

== Cyatholipidae ==
- Alaranea alba Griswold, 1997
- Alaranea ardua Griswold, 1997
- Alaranea betsileo Griswold, 1997
- Alaranea merina Griswold, 1997
- Ulwembua antsiranana Griswold, 1997
- Ulwembua nigra Griswold, 2001
- Ulwembua ranomafana Griswold, 1997
- Vazaha toamasina Griswold, 1997

== Deinopidae ==
- Deinopis madagascariensis Lenz, 1886

== Desidae ==
- Desis crosslandi Pocock, 1902 — also Zanzibar

== Dipluridae ==
- Thelechoris rutenbergi Karsch, 1881
- Thelechoris striatipes (Simon, 1889) — also East, Southern Africa

== Eresidae ==
- Stegodyphus mimosarum Pavesi, 1883 — also Africa
- Stegodyphus simplicifrons Simon, 1906

== Filistatidae ==
- Andoharano decaryi (Fage, 1945)
- Andoharano grandidieri (Simon, 1901)
- Andoharano milloti Legendre, 1971
- Andoharano monodi Legendre, 1971

== Gallieniellidae ==
- Gallieniella betroka Platnick, 1984
- Gallieniella blanci Platnick, 1984
- Gallieniella mygaloides Millot, 1947
- Legendrena angavokely Platnick, 1984
- Legendrena perinet Platnick, 1984
- Legendrena rolandi Platnick, 1984
- Legendrena rothi Platnick, 1995
- Legendrena spiralis Platnick, 1995
- Legendrena steineri Platnick, 1990
- Legendrena tamatave Platnick, 1984

== Gnaphosidae ==
- Camillina fiana Platnick & Murphy, 1987 — also Comoro Islands
- Camillina tsima Platnick & Murphy, 1987
- Drassodes malagassicus (Butler, 1879)
- Poecilochroa malagassa Strand, 1907
- Scotophaeus nossibeensis Strand, 1907
- Zelotes bastardi (Simon, 1896)
- Zelotes madagascaricus (Strand, 1907)

== Hersiliidae ==
- Hersilia eloetsensis Foord & Dippenaar-Schoeman, 2006
- Hersilia fossulata Karsch, 1881
- Hersilia insulana Strand, 1907
- Hersilia madagascariensis (Wunderlich, 2004) — also Comoro Islands
- Hersilia tamatavensis Foord & Dippenaar-Schoeman, 2006
- Hersilia vinsoni Lucas, 1869

== Idiopidae ==
- Genysa bicalcarata Simon, 1889
- Genysa decorsei (Simon, 1902)
- Hiboka geayi Fage, 1922

== Linyphiidae ==
- Helsdingenia extensa (Locket, 1968) — also St. Helena, Africa, Comoro Islands
- Microlinyphia simoni van Helsdingen, 1970
- Thapsagus pulcher Simon, 1894
- Thyreobaeus scutiger Simon, 1889
- Tmeticides araneiformis Strand, 1907

== Liocranidae ==
- Donuea decorsei (Simon, 1903)

== Lycosidae ==
- Arctosa atroventrosa (Lenz, 1886)
- Geolycosa nossibeensis (Strand, 1907)
- Geolycosa urbana hova (Strand, 1907)
- Hognoides urbanides (Strand, 1907)
- Lycosa madagascariensis Vinson, 1863
- Lycosa signata Lenz, 1886
- Ocyale fera Strand, 1908
- Pardosa cinerascens (Roewer, 1951)
- Pardosa vinsoni (Roewer, 1951)
- Pardosa zorimorpha (Strand, 1907)
- Tricassa madagascariensis Jocqué & Alderweireldt, 2001
- Wadicosa jocquei Kronestedt, 2015
- Wadicosa paulyi Kronestedt, 2017

== Migidae ==
- Micromesomma cowani Pocock, 1895
- Paramigas alluaudi (Simon, 1903)
- Paramigas andasibe Raven, 2001
- Paramigas goodmani Griswold & Ledford, 2001
- Paramigas macrops Griswold & Ledford, 2001
- Paramigas manakambus Griswold & Ledford, 2001
- Paramigas milloti Griswold & Ledford, 2001
- Paramigas oracle Griswold & Ledford, 2001
- Paramigas pauliani (Dresco & Canard, 1975)
- Paramigas pectinatus Griswold & Ledford, 2001
- Paramigas perroti (Simon, 1891)
- Paramigas rothorum Griswold & Ledford, 2001
- Thyropoeus malagasus (Strand, 1908)
- Thyropoeus mirandus Pocock, 1895

== Mimetidae ==
- Ero lokobeana Emerit, 1996
- Ero madagascariensis Emerit, 1996
- Mimetus madacassus Emerit, 1996

== Miturgidae ==
- Cheiracanthium insulare (Vinson, 1863) — also Réunion
- Cheiracanthium leucophaeum Simon, 1897

== Nemesiidae ==
- Entypesa annulipes (Strand, 1907)
- Entypesa nebulosa Simon, 1902

== Oxyopidae ==
- Hostus paroculus Simon, 1898
- Oxyopes dumonti (Vinson, 1863) — also East Africa to Seychelles
- Oxyopes pallidecoloratus Strand, 1906 — also Ethiopia, Congo, East Africa
- Peucetia lucasi (Vinson, 1863) — also Comoro Islands
- Peucetia madagascariensis (Vinson, 1863) — also Comoro Islands

== Philodromidae ==
- Philodromus niveus Vinson, 1863
- Thanatus philodromicus Strand, 1916

== Pholcidae ==
- Crossopriza nigrescens Millot, 1946
- Leptopholcus sakalavensis Millot, 1946
- Paramicromerys betsileo Huber, 2003
- Paramicromerys coddingtoni Huber, 2003
- Paramicromerys combesi (Millot, 1946)
- Paramicromerys madagascariensis (Simon, 1893)
- Paramicromerys mahira Huber, 2003
- Paramicromerys manantenina Huber, 2003
- Paramicromerys marojejy Huber, 2003
- Paramicromerys megaceros (Millot, 1946)
- Paramicromerys nampoinai Huber, 2003
- Paramicromerys quinteri Huber, 2003
- Paramicromerys rabeariveloi Huber, 2003
- Paramicromerys ralamboi Huber, 2003
- Paramicromerys rothorum Huber, 2003
- Paramicromerys scharffi Huber, 2003
- Pholcus lambertoni Millot, 1946
- Smeringopus madagascariensis Millot, 1946
- Spermophora ranomafana Huber, 2003
- Spermophora vyvato Huber, 2003
- Zatavua analalava Huber, 2003
- Zatavua andrei (Millot, 1946)
- Zatavua ankaranae (Millot, 1946)
- Zatavua fagei (Millot, 1946)
- Zatavua griswoldi Huber, 2003
- Zatavua imerinensis (Millot, 1946)
- Zatavua impudica (Millot, 1946)
- Zatavua isalo Huber, 2003
- Zatavua kely Huber, 2003
- Zatavua madagascariensis (Fage, 1945)
- Zatavua mahafaly Huber, 2003
- Zatavua punctata (Millot, 1946)
- Zatavua talatakely Huber, 2003
- Zatavua tamatave Huber, 2003
- Zatavua voahangyae Huber, 2003
- Zatavua vohiparara Huber, 2003
- Zatavua zanahary Huber, 2003

== Phyxelididae ==
- Ambohima pauliani Griswold, 1990
- Ambohima sublima Griswold, 1990
- Phyxelida fanivelona Griswold, 1990
- Phyxelida malagasyana Griswold, 1990

== Pisauridae ==
- Caripetella madagascariensis (Lenz, 1886) — also Comoro Islands
- Dolomedes saccalavus Strand, 1907
- Hala impigra Jocqué, 1994
- Hala paulyi Jocqué, 1994
- Hygropoda madagascarica Strand, 1907
- Hypsithylla linearis Simon, 1903
- Maypacius bilineatus (Pavesi, 1895) — also Central, East Africa
- Maypacius vittiger Simon, 1898
- Paracladycnis vis Blandin, 1979
- Ransonia mahasoana Blandin, 1979
- Tallonia picta Simon, 1889
- Thalassiopsis vachoni Roewer, 1955
- Thalassius esimoni Sierwald, 1984
- Thalassius leoninus Strand, 1916
- Thalassius majungensis Strand, 1907
- Tolma toreuta Jocqué, 1994

== Salticidae ==
- Asemonea ornatissima Peckham & Wheeler, 1889
- Bavia albolineata Peckham & Peckham, 1885
- Beata lineata (Vinson, 1863)
- Brettus madagascarensis (Peckham & Peckham, 1903)
- Carrhotus harringtoni Prószynski, 1992
- Cyrba legendrei Wanless, 1984 — also Comoro Islands
- Echinussa imerinensis Simon, 1901
- Echinussa praedatoria (Keyserling, 1877)
- Echinussa vibrabunda (Simon, 1886)
- Evarcha madagascariensis Prószynski, 1992
- Goleba lyra Maddison & Zhang, 2006
- Goleba punctata (Peckham & Wheeler, 1888)
- Goleta peckhami Simon, 1900
- Goleta workmani (Peckham & Peckham, 1885)
- Harmochirus bianoriformis (Strand, 1907) — also Central, East Africa
- Heliophanus hamifer Simon, 1886 — also Mozambique, Zimbabwe, Seychelles
- Heliophanus imerinensis Simon, 1901
- Heliophanus innominatus Wesolowska, 1986
- Heliophanus modicus Peckham & Peckham, 1903 — also South Africa
- Heliophanus mucronatus Simon, 1901
- Heliophanus orchesta Simon, 1886 — also Central, South Africa
- Hispo cingulata Simon, 1886
- Hispo frenata (Simon, 1900)
- Hispo macfarlanei Wanless, 1981
- Hispo pullata Wanless, 1981
- Hispo sulcata Wanless, 1981
- Hispo tenuis Wanless, 1981
- Hyllus albomarginatus (Lenz, 1886)
- Hyllus albooculatus (Vinson, 1863)
- Hyllus bifasciatus Ono, 1993
- Hyllus interrogationis (Strand, 1907)
- Hyllus lugubrellus Strand, 1908
- Hyllus lugubris (Vinson, 1863)
- Hyllus madagascariensis (Vinson, 1863)
- Hyllus nossibeensis Strand, 1907
- Hyllus vinsoni (Peckham & Peckham, 1885)
- Hyllus virgillus Strand, 1907
- Macopaeus spinosus Simon, 1900
- Meleon madagascarensis (Wanless, 1978)
- Meleon russata (Simon, 1900)
- Myrmarachne andringitra Wanless, 1978
- Myrmarachne augusta (Peckham & Peckham, 1892)
- Myrmarachne cowani (Peckham & Peckham, 1892)
- Myrmarachne diegoensis Wanless, 1978
- Myrmarachne electrica (Peckham & Peckham, 1892)
- Myrmarachne eugenei Wanless, 1978
- Myrmarachne eumenes (Simon, 1900)
- Myrmarachne longiventris (Simon, 1903)
- Myrmarachne mahasoa Wanless, 1978
- Myrmarachne nubilis Wanless, 1978
- Myrmarachne peckhami Roewer, 1951
- Myrmarachne ransoni Wanless, 1978
- Myrmarachne simplexella Roewer, 1951
- Myrmarachne volatilis (Peckham & Peckham, 1892) — also China, Vietnam
- Natta chionogaster (Simon, 1901) — also Africa
- Pachypoessa lacertosa Simon, 1902 — also Southern Africa
- Padilla armata Peckham & Peckham, 1894
- Padilla cornuta (Peckham & Peckham, 1885)
- Padilla glauca Simon, 1900
- Padilla lancearia Simon, 1900
- Padilla mantis Simon, 1900
- Padilla sartor Simon, 1900
- Pandisus decorus Wanless, 1980
- Pandisus modestus (Peckham & Wheeler, 1889)
- Pandisus parvulus Wanless, 1980
- Pandisus sarae Wanless, 1980
- Pandisus scalaris Simon, 1900
- Pharacocerus ebenauensis Strand, 1908
- Pharacocerus sessor Simon, 1902
- Phaulostylus furcifer Simon, 1902
- Phaulostylus grammicus Simon, 1902
- Phaulostylus grandidieri Simon, 1902
- Phaulostylus leucolophus Simon, 1902
- Pochyta albimana Simon, 1902
- Poessa argenteofrenata Simon, 1902
- Portia schultzi Karsch, 1878 — also Central, East, Southern Africa
- Pseudicius unicus (Peckham & Peckham, 1894)
- Quekettia georgius (Peckham & Peckham, 1892)
- Salticus coronatus (Camboué, 1887)
- Thyene inflata (Gerstäcker, 1873) — also Africa
- Thyene tamatavi (Vinson, 1863)
- Thyene varians Peckham & Peckham, 1901
- Tomocyrba andasibe Maddison & Zhang, 2006
- Tomocyrba barbata Simon, 1900
- Tomocyrba decollata Simon, 1900

== Scytodidae ==
- Scytodes oswaldi Lenz, 1891

== Segestriidae ==
- Segestria madagascarensis Keyserling, 1877

== Selenopidae ==
- Anyphops benoiti Corronca, 1998
- Garcorops madagascar Corronca, 2003
- Garcorops paulyi Corronca, 2003
- Hovops betsileo Corronca & Rodríguez Artigas, 2011
- Hovops dufouri (Vinson, 1863) — also Réunion
- Hovops legrasi (Simon, 1887)
- Hovops lidiae Corronca & Rodríguez Artigas, 2011
- Hovops madagascariensis (Vinson, 1863)
- Hovops mariensis (Strand, 1908)
- Hovops merina Corronca & Rodríguez Artigas, 2011
- Hovops modestus (Lenz, 1886)
- Hovops pusillus (Simon, 1887)
- Selenops ivohibe Corronca, 2005
- Selenops vigilans Pocock, 1898 — also West, Central, East Africa

== Sparassidae ==
- Chrosioderma albidum Simon, 1897
- Chrosioderma analalava Silva, 2005
- Chrosioderma havia Silva, 2005
- Chrosioderma mahavelona Silva, 2005
- Chrosioderma mipentinapentina Silva, 2005
- Chrosioderma namoroka Silva, 2005
- Chrosioderma ranomafana Silva, 2005
- Chrosioderma roaloha Silva, 2005
- Chrosioderma soalala Silva, 2005
- Damastes atrignathus Strand, 1908
- Damastes coquereli Simon, 1880
  - Damastes coquereli affinis Strand, 1907
- Damastes decoratus (Simon, 1897)
- Damastes fasciolatus (Simon, 1903)
- Damastes flavomaculatus Simon, 1880
- Damastes grandidieri Simon, 1880
- Damastes majungensis Strand, 1907
- Damastes malagassus (Fage, 1926)
- Damastes malagasus (Karsch, 1881)
- Damastes masculinus Strand, 1908
- Damastes nossibeensis Strand, 1907
- Damastes oswaldi Lenz, 1891
- Damastes pallidus (Schenkel, 1937)
- Damastes sikoranus Strand, 1906
- Eusparassus laterifuscus Strand, 1908
- Megaloremmius leo Simon, 1903
- Olios coenobitus Fage, 1926
- Olios erraticus Fage, 1926
- Olios lamarcki (Latreille, 1806) — also Madagascar to Sri Lanka, India
- Olios malagassus Strand, 1907
  - Olios malagassus septifer Strand, 1908
- Olios mordax (O. P.-Cambridge, 1899)
- Olios nossibeensis Strand, 1907
- Olios pusillus Simon, 1880
- Olios subpusillus Strand, 1907
- Palystes convexus Strand, 1907
- Palystes spiralis Strand, 1907
- Rhitymna hildebrandti Järvi, 1914
- Rhitymna imerinensis (Vinson, 1863)
- Staianus acuminatus Simon, 1889

== Stiphidiidae ==
- Ischalea incerta (O. P.-Cambridge, 1877)

== Synaphridae ==
- Africepheia madagascariensis Miller, 2007
- Synaphris schlingeri Miller, 2007
- Synaphris toliara Miller, 2007

== Tengellidae ==
- Calamistrula evanescens Dahl, 1901

== Tetrablemmidae ==
- Shearella browni (Shear, 1978)

== Tetragnathidae ==
- Diphya pumila Simon, 1888
- Leucauge lechei Strand, 1908
- Leucauge tetragnathella Strand, 1907
- Leucauge undulata (Vinson, 1863) — also Ethiopia, East Africa, Rodrigues Island
- Orsinome vorkampiana Strand, 1907
- Pachygnatha longipes Simon, 1894
- Tetragnatha protensa Walckenaer, 1842 — also Madagascar to Australia, New Caledonia, Palau

== Theraphosidae ==
- Encyocrates raffrayi Simon, 1892
- Monocentropus lambertoni Fage, 1922
- Phoneyusa bouvieri Berland, 1917

== Theridiidae ==
- Anelosimus andasibe Agnarsson & Kuntner, 2005
- Anelosimus decaryi (Fage, 1930) — also Aldabra
- Anelosimus may Agnarsson, 2005
- Anelosimus nazariani Agnarsson & Kuntner, 2005
- Anelosimus sallee Agnarsson & Kuntner, 2005
- Anelosimus salut Agnarsson & Kuntner, 2005
- Anelosimus vondrona Agnarsson & Kuntner, 2005
- Argyrodes abscissus O. P.-Cambridge, 1880
- Argyrodes meus Strand, 1907
- Argyrodes minax O. P.-Cambridge, 1880 — also Comoro Islands
- Argyrodes sextuberculosus Strand, 1908 — also Mozambique
- Argyrodes viridis (Vinson, 1863) — also Réunion
- Argyrodes zonatus (Walckenaer, 1842) — also East Africa, Réunion, Bioko
- Asygyna coddingtoni Agnarsson, 2006
- Asygyna huberi Agnarsson, 2006
- Crustulina ambigua Simon, 1889
- Dipoena transversisulcata Strand, 1908
- Latrodectus menavodi Vinson, 1863 — also Comoro Islands
- Latrodectus obscurior Dahl, 1902 — also Cape Verde Islands
- Phoroncidia aurata O. P.-Cambridge, 1877
- Phoroncidia quadrispinella Strand, 1907
- Phoroncidia rubroargentea Berland, 1913
- Phycosoma excisum (Simon, 1889)
- Theridion decemperlatum (Simon, 1889)
- Theridion lacticolor Berland, 1920 — also Kenya, Yemen
- Theridion quadrilineatum Lenz, 1886
- Theridula perlata Simon, 1889
- Theridula theriella Strand, 1907
- Thwaitesia argenteosquamata (Lenz, 1891)
- Thwaitesia aureosignata (Lenz, 1891)
- Thwaitesia pulcherrima Butler, 1882
- Tidarren apartiolum Knoflach & van Harten, 2006
- Tidarren dasyglossa Knoflach & van Harten, 2006
- Tidarren ephemerum Knoflach & van Harten, 2006
- Tidarren horaki Knoflach & van Harten, 2006
- Tidarren obtusum Knoflach & van Harten, 2006

== Thomisidae ==
- Apyretina catenulata (Simon, 1903)
- Apyretina nigra (Simon, 1903)
- Apyretina pentagona (Simon, 1895)
- Apyretina quinquenotata (Simon, 1903)
- Apyretina tessera (Simon, 1903)
- Cyriogonus fuscitarsis Strand, 1908
- Cyriogonus lactifer Simon, 1886
- Cyriogonus rutenbergi (Karsch, 1881)
- Cyriogonus simoni Lenz, 1891
- Cyriogonus triquetrus Simon, 1886
- Cyriogonus vinsoni (Thorell, 1875)
- Diaea nakajimai Ono, 1993
- Diplotychus longulus Simon, 1903
- Emplesiogonus scutulatus Simon, 1903
- Emplesiogonus striatus Simon, 1903
- Firmicus bimaculatus (Simon, 1886)
- Geraesta bilobata Simon, 1897
- Geraesta hirta Simon, 1889
- Herbessus decorsei Simon, 1903
- Iphoctesis echinipes Simon, 1903
- Lampertia pulchra Strand, 1907
- Phrynarachne clavigera Simon, 1903
- Phrynarachne pusiola Simon, 1903
- Phrynarachne rugosa (Latreille, 1804) — also West Africa, Malawi, Mauritius, Réunion
- Plastonomus octoguttatus Simon, 1903
- Pseudoporrhopis granum Simon, 1886
- Pyresthesis laevis (Keyserling, 1877)
- Runcinia oculifrons Strand, 1907
- Soelteria nigra Dahl, 1907
- Stephanopis octolobata Simon, 1886
- Stephanopis rhomboidalis Simon, 1886
- Synema hildebrandti Dahl, 1907
- Synema lunulatum Dahl, 1907
- Synema obscurifrons Dahl, 1907
- Synema obscuripes Dahl, 1907
- Tharrhalea cerussata Simon, 1886
- Tharrhalea semiargentea Simon, 1895
- Tharrhalea superpicta Simon, 1886
- Thomisus boesenbergi Lenz, 1891
- Thomisus lamperti Strand, 1907
- Thomisus madagascariensis Comellini, 1957
  - Thomisus madagascariensis pallidus Comellini, 1957
- Thomisus nossibeensis Strand, 1907
- Trichopagis manicata Simon, 1886 — also Gabon, Guinea, South Africa
- Xysticus hepaticus Simon, 1903

== Trochanteriidae ==
- Platyoides grandidieri Simon, 1903 — also Kenya, Aldabra, Réunion
- Platyoides mailaka Platnick, 1985
- Platyoides velonus Platnick, 1985

== Udubidae ==
- Uduba dahli Simon, 1903
- Uduba madagascariensis (Vinson, 1863)
- Zorodictyna inhonesta (Simon, 1906)
- Zorodictyna oswaldi (Lenz, 1891)

== Uloboridae ==
- Uloborus aureus Vinson, 1863
- Uloborus vanillarum Vinson, 1863
- Uloborus velutinus Butler, 1882

== Zodariidae ==
- Aschema madagascariensis (Strand, 1907)
- Aschema pallida Jocqué, 1991
- Diores anomalus Jocqué, 1990
- Diores milloti Jocqué, 1990
- Madrela angusta (Simon, 1889)
- Madrela madrela Jocqué, 1991
