= Rhitymna occidentalis =

Scientific classification
- Kingdom: Animalia
- Phylum: Arthropoda
- Subphylum: Chelicerata
- Class: Arachnida
- Order: Araneae
- Infraorder: Araneomorphae
- Family: Sparassidae
- Genus: Rhitymna
- Species: R. occidentalis

Binomial name
- Rhitymna occidentalis Jäger, 2003

Species of spider

Rhitymna occidentalis is a species of spider of the genus Rhitymna. It is endemic to Sri Lanka.
