= Helsdingenia ceylonica =

Scientific classification
- Kingdom: Animalia
- Phylum: Arthropoda
- Subphylum: Chelicerata
- Class: Arachnida
- Order: Araneae
- Infraorder: Araneomorphae
- Family: Linyphiidae
- Genus: Helsdingenia
- Species: H. ceylonica

Binomial name
- Helsdingenia ceylonica (van Helsdingen, 1985)

Species of spider

Helsdingenia ceylonica, is a species of spider of the genus Helsdingenia. It is found only in Nepal and Sri Lanka.
