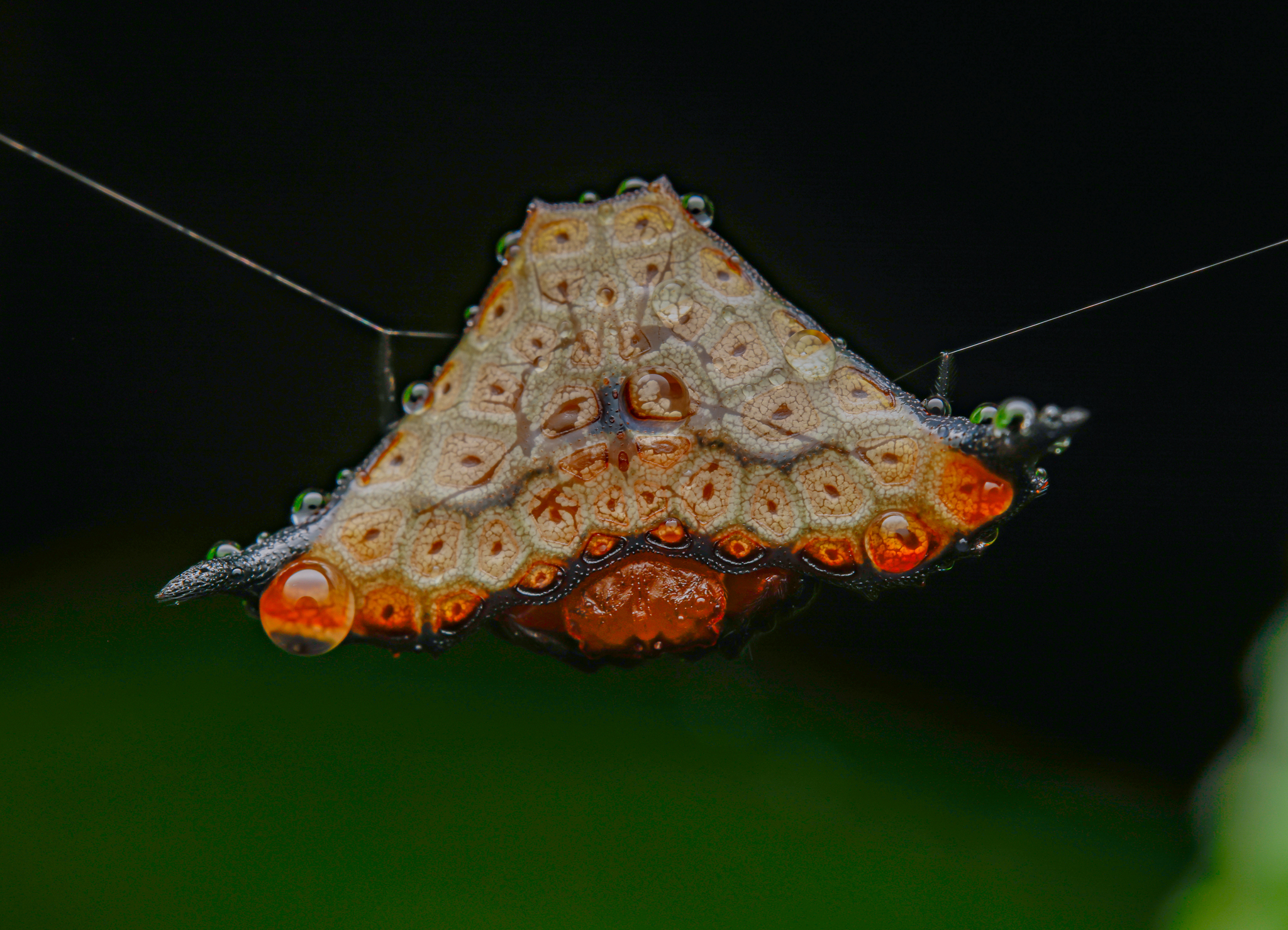

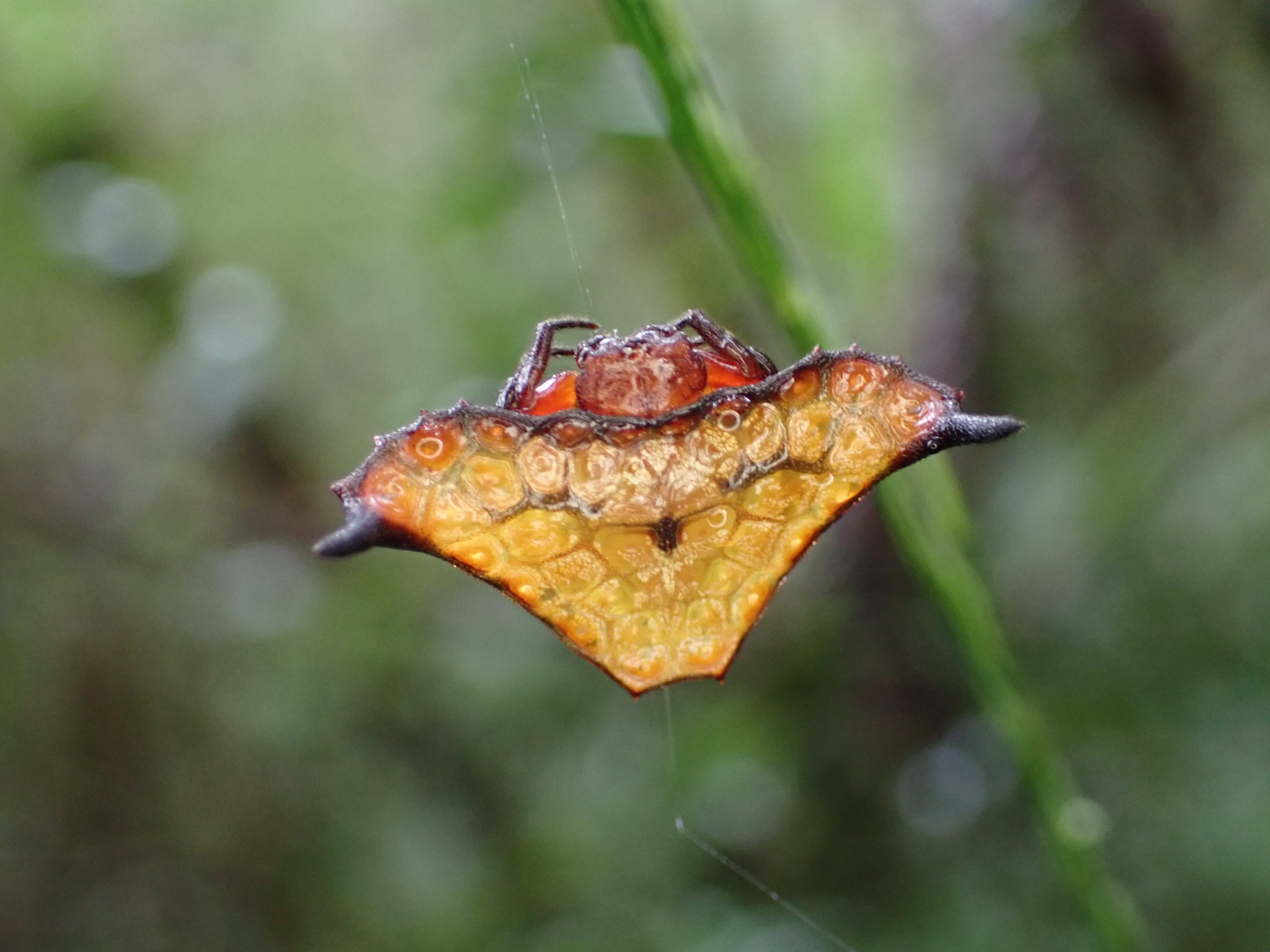

Scientific classification
- Kingdom: Animalia
- Phylum: Arthropoda
- Subphylum: Chelicerata
- Class: Arachnida
- Order: Araneae
- Infraorder: Araneomorphae
- Family: Araneidae
- Genus: Augusta; O. Pickard-Cambridge, 1877
- Species: A. glyphica

Binomial name
- Augusta glyphica (Guérin, 1839)

= Augusta glyphica =

Genus of spiders

Augusta glyphica is the only species in the monotypic spider genus Augusta, which is endemic to Madagascar. The genus name is taken from the Latin word augusta, the feminine form of augustus, meaning "venerable".

== See also ==
- List of spiders of Madagascar
