= Spadera =

Scientific classification
- Kingdom: Animalia
- Phylum: Arthropoda
- Subphylum: Chelicerata
- Class: Arachnida
- Order: Araneae
- Infraorder: Araneomorphae
- Family: Salticidae
- Subfamily: Salticinae
- Genus: Spadera; Peckham & Peckham, 1894
- Species: S. unica

Binomial name
- Spadera unica Peckham & Peckham, 1894

Genus of spiders

Spadera is a genus of jumping spiders containing the single species, Spadera unica. It was first described by George and Elizabeth Peckham in 1894, and has only been found in Madagascar.

== Taxonomy ==
First described in 1894, Spadera unica was transferred to Pseudicius by Eugène Simon in 1901. The genus Spadera remained sunk into Pseudicius until 2017, when Jerzy Prószyński reinstated Spadera unica. Prószyński accepted that S. unica was similar to other members of his informal group "pseudiciines" (especially species of Rudakius), but considered that there were sufficient differences, such as in the shape of the tibial apophysis of the palpal bulb, to retain a separate genus. The representative genus of Prószyński's "pseudiciines" is Pseudicius. In Maddison's 2015 classification of the family Salticidae, Pseudicius is placed in the tribe Chrysillini, part of the Salticoida clade of the subfamily Salticinae.
