= Tricassa deserticola =

Desert Tricassa wolf spider

Scientific classification
- Kingdom: Animalia
- Phylum: Arthropoda
- Subphylum: Chelicerata
- Class: Arachnida
- Order: Araneae
- Infraorder: Araneomorphae
- Family: Lycosidae
- Genus: Tricassa
- Species: T. deserticola

Binomial name
- Tricassa deserticola Simon, 1910

Species of spider

Tricassa deserticola is a species of spider in the family Lycosidae. It is found in southern Africa and is commonly known as the desert Tricassa wolf spider.

== Distribution ==
Tricassa deserticola is found in Namibia and South Africa.

In South Africa, it is recorded from the Western Cape and Northern Cape at altitudes ranging from 7 to 14 m. Localities include Port Nolloth, Buffels Bay, and Wiedou.

== Habitat and ecology ==
Tricassa deserticola is a free-running ground dweller. Some specimens have been sampled from coastal areas on sandy beaches.

== Description ==
Tricassa deserticola shares all of its features with its subfamily Tricassinae, of which it is the only representative member. Its total length ranges from 4.60-5.88 millimetres. It has a pale yellowish white carapace, sternum, and legs, and its abdomen is uniformly pale yellow featuring a "pink glimmer" due to main blood flow.

== Conservation ==
Tricassa deserticola is listed as Least Concern by the South African National Biodiversity Institute due to its wide geographical range.

== Taxonomy ==
Tricassa deserticola was described by Simon in 1910 from Namibia. The species was revised by Alderweireldt and Jocqué (1993), and both sexes are known and illustrated.
