= Genysa =

Scientific classification
- Kingdom: Animalia
- Phylum: Arthropoda
- Subphylum: Chelicerata
- Class: Arachnida
- Order: Araneae
- Infraorder: Mygalomorphae
- Family: Idiopidae
- Genus: Genysa; Simon, 1889

Type species
- G. bicalcarata Simon, 1889

Species
- G. bicalcarata Simon, 1889 – Madagascar; G. decorsei (Simon, 1902) – Madagascar; G. decorsei (Simon, 1902) – Madagascar

Synonyms
- Diadocyrtus Simon, 1902; Genysochoera Simon, 1902

Genus of spiders

Genysa is a genus of East African armored trapdoor spiders that was first described by Eugène Louis Simon in 1889. As of May 2019 it contains only three species, all found in Madagascar: G. bicalcarata, G. decorsei, and G. decorsei.

== See also ==
- List of spiders of Madagascar
