= Hognoides =

Scientific classification
- Kingdom: Animalia
- Phylum: Arthropoda
- Subphylum: Chelicerata
- Class: Arachnida
- Order: Araneae
- Infraorder: Araneomorphae
- Family: Lycosidae
- Genus: Hognoides; Roewer

Species
- Hognoides ukrewea Roewer, 1960; Hognoides urbanides (Strand, 1907)

Genus of spiders

Hognoides is a genus of spiders in the family Lycosidae. It was first described in 1960 by Roewer. As of 2017, it contains 2 species.
