= Tricassa =

Scientific classification
- Kingdom: Animalia
- Phylum: Arthropoda
- Subphylum: Chelicerata
- Class: Arachnida
- Order: Araneae
- Infraorder: Araneomorphae
- Family: Lycosidae
- Genus: Tricassa; Simon

Species
- T. deserticola Simon, 1910; T. madagascariensis Jocqué & Alderweireldt, 2001

Genus of spiders

Tricassa is a genus of African spiders in the family Lycosidae with two species. It was first described in 1910 by Eugène Simon.

== Description ==
The genus is recognized by the long anterior spinnerets, the large shaft-like longitudinal median apophysis in the male palp, the simple epigyne with papillose surface of the scape, and the long winding copulatory ducts in the female.

The carapace is uniformly pale yellowish white without median or lateral coloured bands as present in many other lycosids. The profile is domed, not falling sharply towards the posterior margin. The abdomen is almost completely uniformly pale yellow with no abdominal colour pattern, sometimes with a pink glimmer or somewhat transparent showing the main blood vessel, and has a group of stronger hairs on its dorso-basal edge. The ventral surface is uniformly pale yellow.

The legs are long and slender, uniform pale yellow without darker patches or annulations.

== Life style ==
Tricassa are free-running ground dwellers. The genus seems to be restricted to coastal areas where it prefers sandy beaches.

== Species ==
As of October 2025, this genus includes two species:

- Tricassa deserticola Simon, 1910 – Namibia, South Africa (type species)
- Tricassa madagascariensis Jocqué & Alderweireldt, 2001 – Madagascar
