= Helsdingenia =

Scientific classification
- Kingdom: Animalia
- Phylum: Arthropoda
- Subphylum: Chelicerata
- Class: Arachnida
- Order: Araneae
- Infraorder: Araneomorphae
- Family: Linyphiidae
- Genus: Helsdingenia; Saaristo & Tanasevitch, 2003

Type species
- H. ceylonica (van Helsdingen, 1985)

Species
- 4, see text

Genus of spiders

Helsdingenia is a genus of dwarf spiders that was first described by Michael I. Saaristo & A. V. Tanasevitch in 2003. The name is a reference to Dr. P. J van Helsdingen.

They are usually pale colored spiders that grow up to 2.45 millimetres (0.096 in) long. Males are smaller than females, but females are distinguishable by their finger-like extensions in epigyne. There are four pairs of dark spots in an abdominal pattern that are connected to each other, creating two parallel stripes.

== Species ==
As of May 2019 it contains four species, found in Cameroon, Comoros, Indonesia, on Madagascar, Nepal, Nigeria, and Sri Lanka:

- Helsdingenia ceylonica (van Helsdingen, 1985) (type) – Nepal, Sri Lanka
- Helsdingenia extensa (Locket, 1968) – St. Helena, Africa, Madagascar, Comoros
- Helsdingenia hebes (Locket & Russell-Smith, 1980) – Nigeria, Cameroon
- Helsdingenia hebesoides Saaristo & Tanasevitch, 2003 – Indonesia (Sumatra)
