= Emplesiogonus =

Scientific classification
- Kingdom: Animalia
- Phylum: Arthropoda
- Subphylum: Chelicerata
- Class: Arachnida
- Order: Araneae
- Infraorder: Araneomorphae
- Family: Thomisidae
- Genus: Emplesiogonus; Simon, 1903

Type species
- E. striatus Simon, 1903

Species
- E. scutulatus Simon, 1903 – Madagascar; E. striatus Simon, 1903 – Madagascar

Genus of spiders

Emplesiogonus is a genus of African crab spiders that was first described by Eugène Louis Simon in 1903. As of September 2020 it contains two species, found on Madagascar: E. scutulatus and E. striatus.

== See also ==
- List of Thomisidae species
