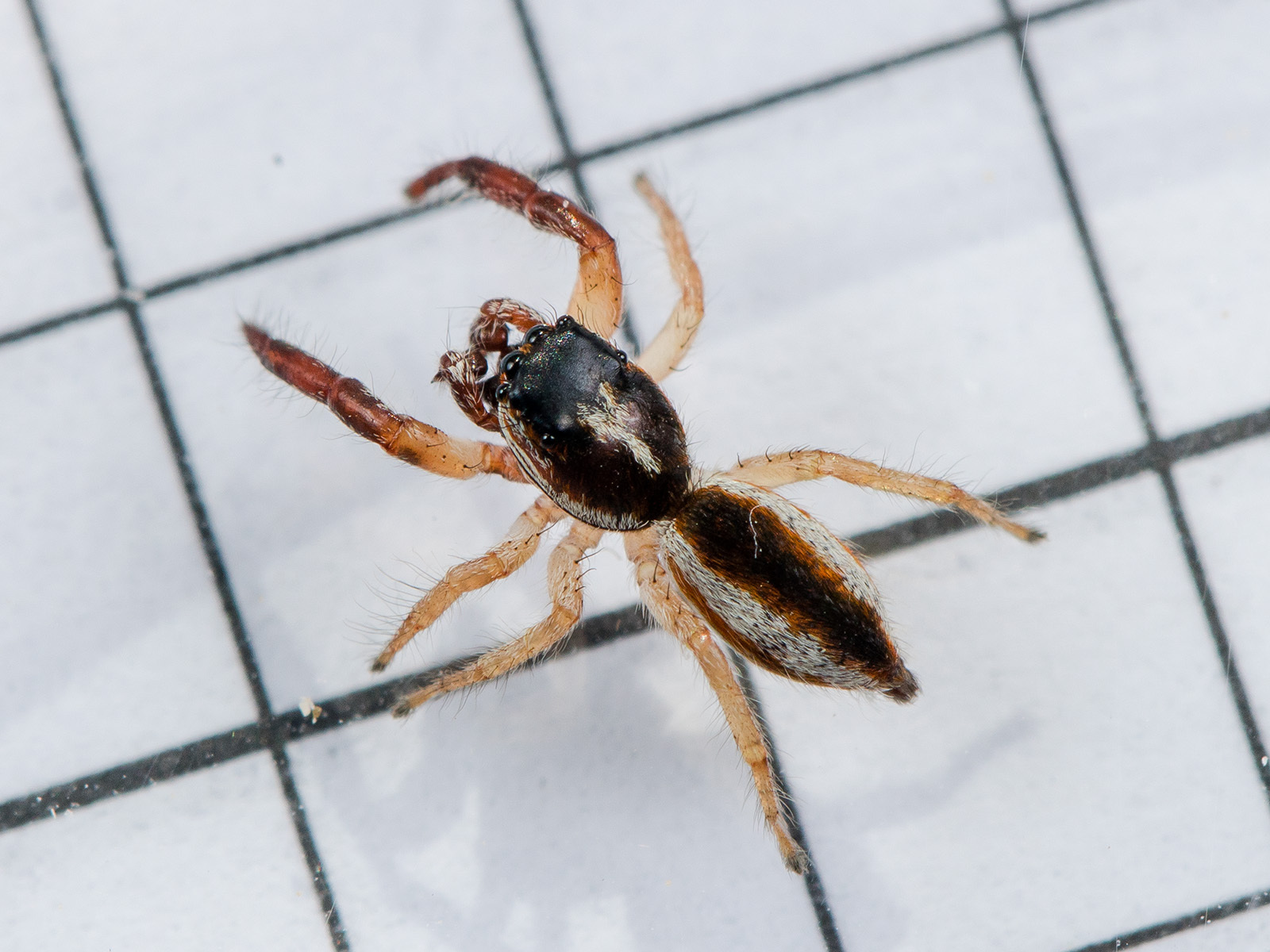
- R. cinctus from Kazakhstan

Scientific classification
- Kingdom: Animalia
- Phylum: Arthropoda
- Subphylum: Chelicerata
- Class: Arachnida
- Order: Araneae
- Infraorder: Araneomorphae
- Family: Salticidae
- Subfamily: Salticinae
- Genus: Rudakius; Prószyński, 2016

Type species
- Rudakius cinctus

Species
- 7, see text

= Rudakius =

Genus of spiders

Rudakius is a genus of spiders in the family Salticidae. It was first described in 2016 by Prószyński. As of 2017, it contains 7 species.

== Taxonomy ==
The genus Rudakius was one of a number of new genera erected by Jerzy Prószyński in 2016, largely for species formerly placed in Pseudicius. Prószyński placed these genera in his informal group "pseudiciines", with Pseudicius as the representative genus. In Wayne Maddison's 2015 classification of the family Salticidae, Pseudicius, broadly circumscribed, is placed in the tribe Chrysillini, part of the Salticoida clade of the subfamily Salticinae.

=== Species ===
Rudakius comprises the following species:

- Rudakius afghanicus (Andreeva, Heciak & Prószyński, 1984) – Iran, Afghanistan, Kazakhstan, Uzbekistan
- Rudakius cinctus (O. Pickard-Cambridge, 1885) – Iran, Central Asia to China
- Rudakius ludhianaensis (Tikader, 1974) – India
- Rudakius maureri (Prószyński, 1992) – Malaysia
- Rudakius rudakii (Prószyński, 1992) – Iran
- Rudakius spasskyi (Andreeva, Heciak & Prószyński, 1984) – Iran, Central Asia
- Rudakius wenshanensis (He & Hu, 1999) – China
