= Diplotychus =

Scientific classification
- Kingdom: Animalia
- Phylum: Arthropoda
- Subphylum: Chelicerata
- Class: Arachnida
- Order: Araneae
- Infraorder: Araneomorphae
- Family: Thomisidae
- Genus: Diplotychus; Simon, 1903
- Species: D. longulus

Binomial name
- Diplotychus longulus Simon, 1903

Monotypic genus of spiders

Diplotychus is a monotypic genus of African crab spiders containing the single species, Diplotychus longulus. It was first described by Eugène Louis Simon in 1903, and is found on Madagascar.

== See also ==
- List of Thomisidae species
