= Asygyna coddingtoni =

Scientific classification
- Kingdom: Animalia
- Phylum: Arthropoda
- Subphylum: Chelicerata
- Class: Arachnida
- Order: Araneae
- Infraorder: Araneomorphae
- Family: Theridiidae
- Genus: Asygyna
- Species: A. coddingtoni

Binomial name
- Asygyna coddingtoni Agnarsson, 2006

Species of spider

Asygyna coddingtoni is a species of cobweb spider in the family Theridiidae. It is found in Madagascar.
