= Pseudoporrhopis =

Scientific classification
- Kingdom: Animalia
- Phylum: Arthropoda
- Subphylum: Chelicerata
- Class: Arachnida
- Order: Araneae
- Infraorder: Araneomorphae
- Family: Thomisidae
- Genus: Pseudoporrhopis
- Species: P. granum

Binomial name
- Pseudoporrhopis granum Simon, 1886
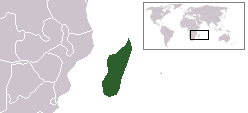

Genus of spiders

Pseudoporrhopis is a genus of spiders in the family Thomisidae. It was first described in 1886 by Simon. As of 2017, it contains only one species, Pseudoporrhopis granum, found in Madagascar.
