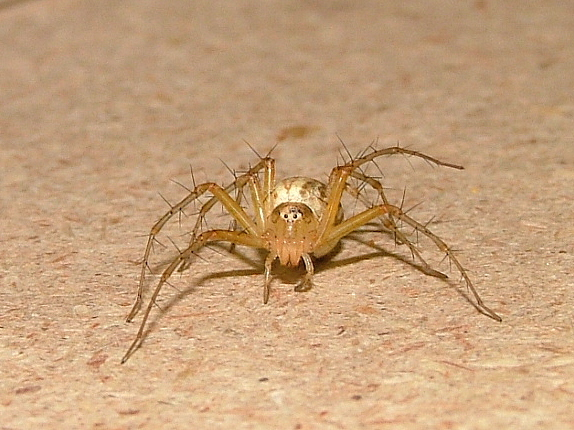

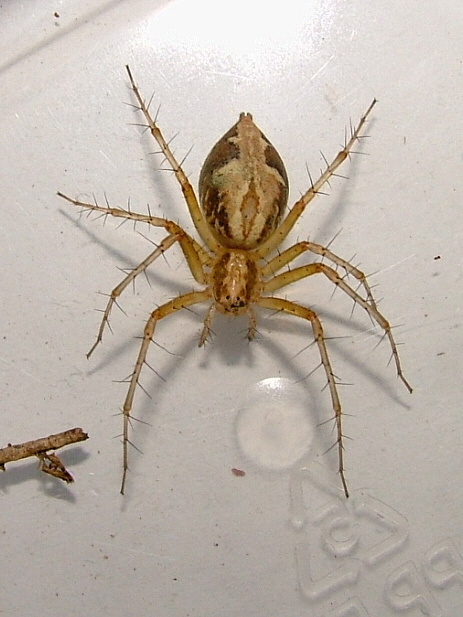

Scientific classification
- Kingdom: Animalia
- Phylum: Arthropoda
- Subphylum: Chelicerata
- Class: Arachnida
- Order: Araneae
- Infraorder: Araneomorphae
- Family: Oxyopidae
- Genus: Oxyopes
- Species: O. dumonti

Binomial name
- Oxyopes dumonti (Vinson, 1863)

Synonyms
- Sphasus dumontii Vinson, 1863; Oxyopes alluaudi Simon, 1893; Oxyopes hova Strand, 1907

= Oxyopes dumonti =

Dumont's Lynx Spider

Species of spider

Oxyopes dumonti is a species of spider in the family Oxyopidae. It is commonly known as Dumont's lynx spider.

== Distribution ==
Oxyopes dumonti occurs in Ethiopia, Madagascar, Mauritius, Rodrigues, Réunion, Seychelles, Zimbabwe, and South Africa. In South Africa, the species has been recorded from three provinces at altitudes ranging from 317 to 951 m above sea level.

== Habitat and ecology ==
The species has been found primarily in Savanna and Thicket biomes. It appears to be well-adapted to the warmer, drier environments characteristic of these biome types.

== Description ==
Oxyopes dumonti is known from both sexes and resembles O. pallidecoloratus. The species exhibits the characteristic lynx spider morphology with long, slender legs bearing prominent spines and a tapering opisthosoma.

== Conservation ==
Oxyopes dumonti is listed as Least Concern by the South African National Biodiversity Institute due to its wide geographic range across multiple countries. The species is protected in three protected areas: Kruger National Park, Blouberg Nature Reserve, and Venetia Limpopo Valley Reserve.
