= Cyriogonus =

Scientific classification
- Kingdom: Animalia
- Phylum: Arthropoda
- Subphylum: Chelicerata
- Class: Arachnida
- Order: Araneae
- Infraorder: Araneomorphae
- Family: Thomisidae
- Genus: Cyriogonus; Simon, 1886

Type species
- C. lactifer Simon, 1886

Species
- 6, see text

Genus of spiders

Cyriogonus is a genus of African crab spiders that was first described by Eugène Louis Simon in 1886.

== Species ==
As of July 2020 it contains six species, found on Madagascar:

- Cyriogonus fuscitarsis Strand, 1908 – Madagascar
- Cyriogonus lactifer Simon, 1886 (type) – Madagascar
- Cyriogonus rutenbergi (Karsch, 1881) – Madagascar
- Cyriogonus simoni Lenz, 1891 – Madagascar
- Cyriogonus triquetrus Simon, 1886 – Madagascar
- Cyriogonus vinsoni (Thorell, 1875) – Madagascar

== See also ==
- List of Thomisidae species
