= Pharacocerus =

Scientific classification
- Kingdom: Animalia
- Phylum: Arthropoda
- Subphylum: Chelicerata
- Class: Arachnida
- Order: Araneae
- Infraorder: Araneomorphae
- Family: Salticidae
- Subfamily: Salticinae
- Genus: Pharacocerus; Simon, 1902

Type species
- P. sessor Simon, 1902

Species
- 7, see text

Genus of spiders

Pharacocerus is a genus of African jumping spiders that was first described by Eugène Louis Simon in 1902. Males are about 4 to 6 millimetres (0.16 to 0.24 in) long, and they are likely related to Plexippus.

== Species ==
As of August 2019 it contains seven species and two subspecies, found only in Africa:

- Pharacocerus castaneiceps Simon, 1910 – Guinea-Bissau
- Pharacocerus ebenauensis Strand, 1908 – Madagascar
- Pharacocerus ephippiatus (Thorell, 1899) – Cameroon
- Pharacocerus fagei Berland & Millot, 1941 – Ivory Coast
  - Pharacocerus f. soudanensis Berland & Millot, 1941 – Mali
  - Pharacocerus f. verdieri Berland & Millot, 1941 – Guinea
- Pharacocerus rubrocomatus Simon, 1910 – Congo
- Pharacocerus sessor Simon, 1902 (type) – Madagascar
- Pharacocerus xanthopogon Simon, 1903 – Equatorial Guinea
