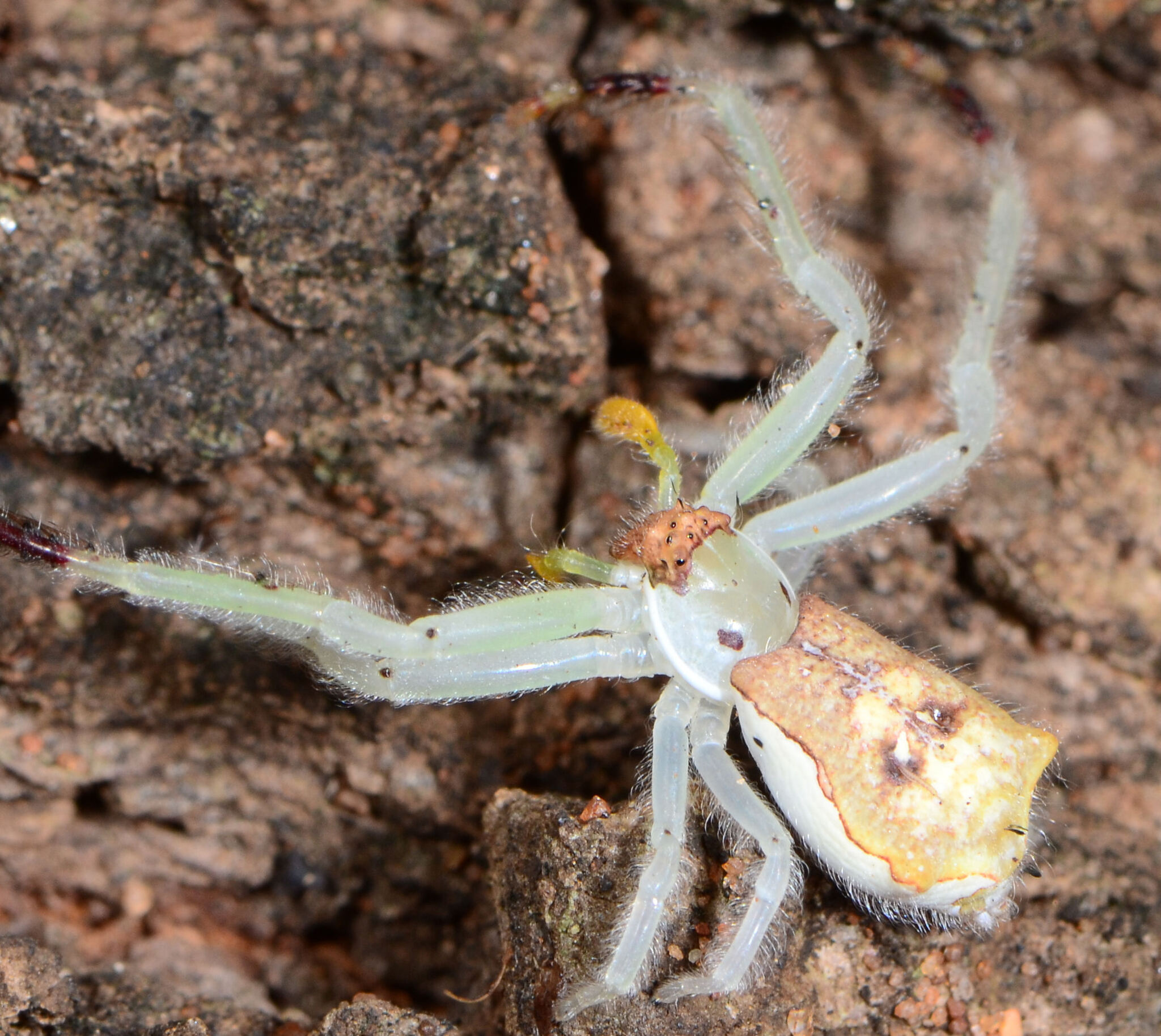
- Juvenile female
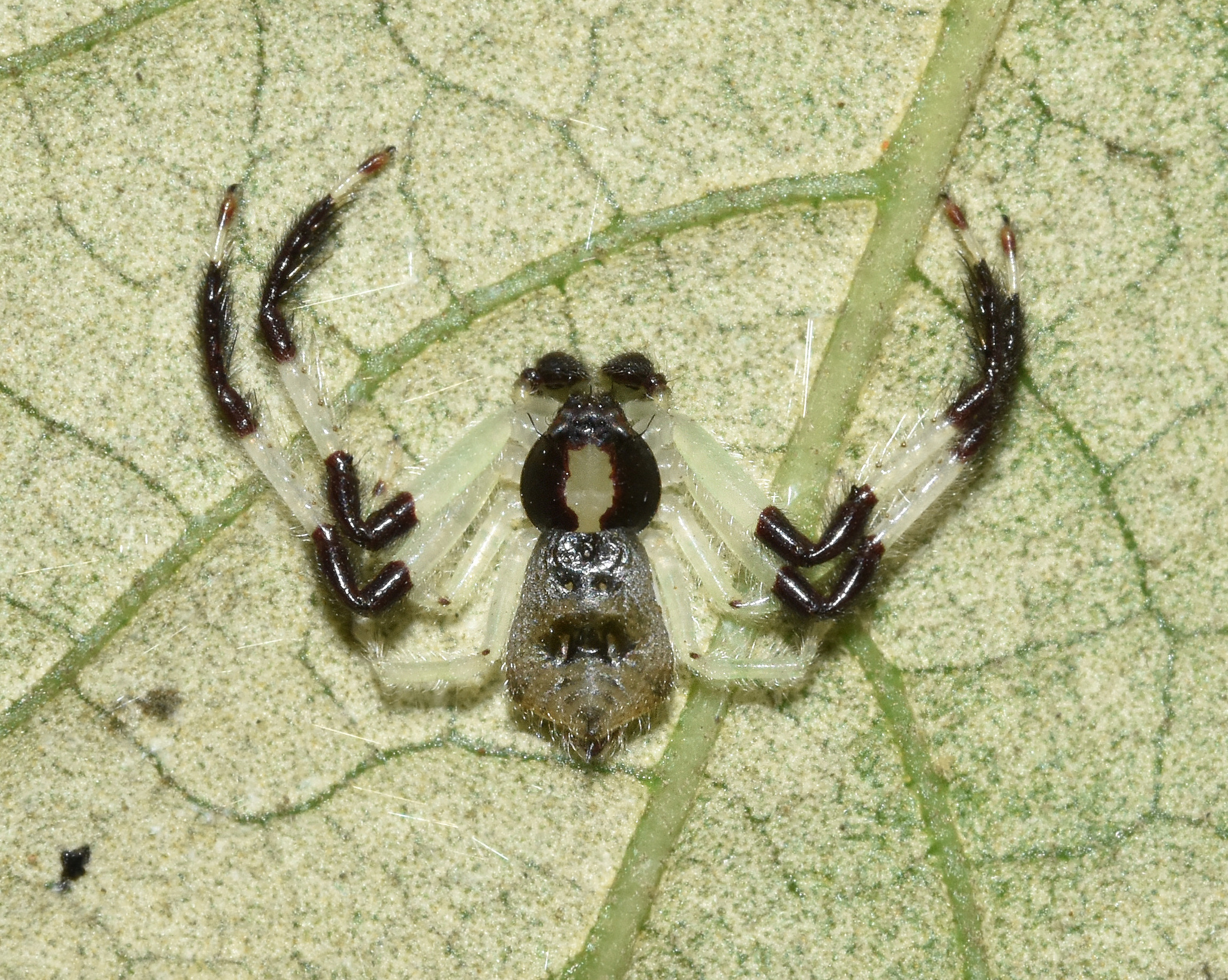
- Male from South Africa

Scientific classification
- Kingdom: Animalia
- Phylum: Arthropoda
- Subphylum: Chelicerata
- Class: Arachnida
- Order: Araneae
- Infraorder: Araneomorphae
- Family: Thomisidae
- Genus: Trichopagis
- Species: T. manicata

Binomial name
- Trichopagis manicata Simon, 1886

= Trichopagis =

Feather Setae Crab Spider

Species of spider

Trichopagis manicata is a species of crab spider of the genus Trichopagis. It is the only species in its genus and is found in Guinea, Gabon, South Africa, and Madagascar.

The specific name "manicata" derives from Latin meaning "having sleeves" or "gloved", referring to the spider's appendages.

== Taxonomy ==
Trichopagis manicata was first described by Eugène Simon in 1886 from Madagascar. The genus Trichopagis is monotypic, containing only this single species.

== Distribution ==
Trichopagis manicata has been recorded from several African countries and Madagascar. In South Africa, it has been found in KwaZulu-Natal, Limpopo, and Mpumalanga provinces. Outside South Africa, the species is known from Guinea, Gabon, and its type locality in Madagascar.

== Habitat ==
Trichopagis manicata is a free-living plant dweller found on trees and shrubs. It has occasionally been found inside flower corollas and on low vegetation. In South Africa, the species has been sampled in the Indian Ocean Coastal Belt and Savanna biomes.

== Description ==
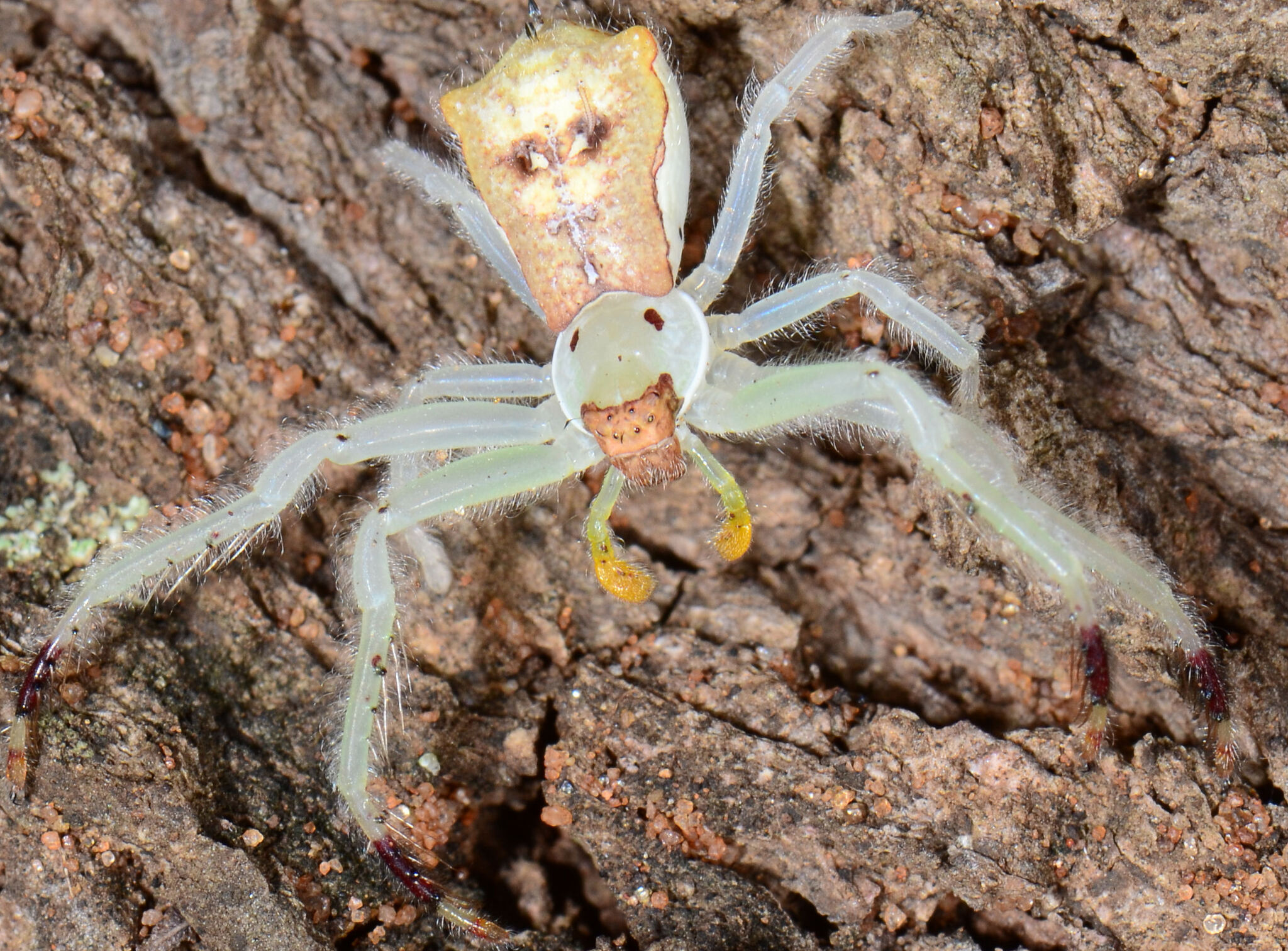
juvenile female

Trichopagis manicata is a medium-sized crab spider. Females measure 5–7 mm in total length, while males are slightly smaller at 4–5 mm.

The carapace is semi-circular, as wide as long, and narrowed in the eye region. The eye region is covered with a broad red-brown band that extends posteriorly from the lateral corners to the posterior border, though sometimes this appears only as two spots. The eyes are arranged in two rows, with the anterior row narrower than the posterior row. The median eyes are smaller than the lateral eyes, and the lateral eyes are positioned on small tubercles.

A distinctive feature of the genus is the presence of large, dark, club-shaped setae situated in the eye region and on the posterior end of the opisthosoma. The clypeus has a narrow white band, and the chelicerae are brown with dense setae.

The opisthosoma is longer than wide, with its greatest width in the posterior third. The abdominal shape varies from narrow to almost triangular. The dorsum has the same pale background as the carapace but is decorated with a large yellowish brown marking that follows the contour of the abdomen. This coloration varies from rich brown to more fawnish brown, with two darker spots medially. The ventral surface has a dark band, and the posterior end bears dark club-shaped setae that are easily lost.

The legs are the same colour as the carapace. In males, legs I and II have the distal ends of the femur and patella dark, as well as the distal ends of the tibia and metatarsus. The tibiae and metatarsi of legs I and II bear numerous strong paired setae. The pedipalps are large, with males having a long retrolateral tibial apophysis. In females, the palpal tarsi are enlarged and yellow, bearing a few strong setae on the border.

== Conservation ==
Trichopagis manicata is considered a rare species with no significant threats identified. It is protected within several nature reserves in South Africa, including Kosi Bay Nature Reserve, Tembe Elephant Park, Ndumo Game Reserve, and Lekgalameetse Nature Reserve. Due to its relatively wide distribution across multiple countries, it is listed as Least Concern, and no specific conservation actions are recommended.
