= Asygyna =

Scientific classification
- Kingdom: Animalia
- Phylum: Arthropoda
- Subphylum: Chelicerata
- Class: Arachnida
- Order: Araneae
- Infraorder: Araneomorphae
- Family: Theridiidae
- Genus: Asygyna; Agnarsson, 2006

Type species
- A. huberi Agnarsson, 2006

Species
- Asygyna coddingtoni Agnarsson, 2006 – Madagascar; Asygyna huberi Agnarsson, 2006 – Madagascar

Genus of spiders

Asygyna is a genus of Malagasy comb-footed spiders that was first described by Ingi Agnarsson in 2006. As of May 2020 it contains two species, found on Madagascar: A. coddingtoni and A. huberi.
