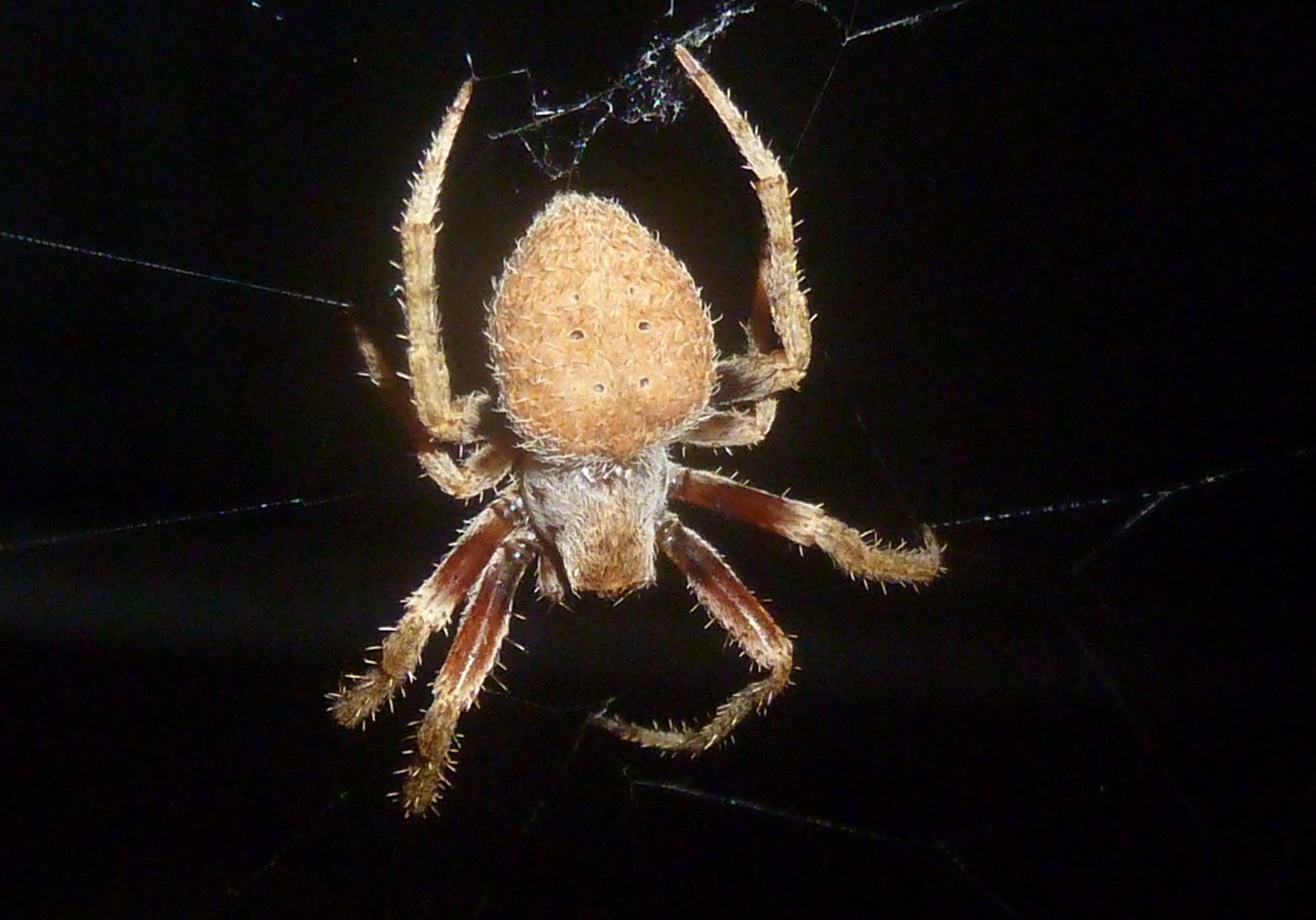
- N. triangula from South Africa
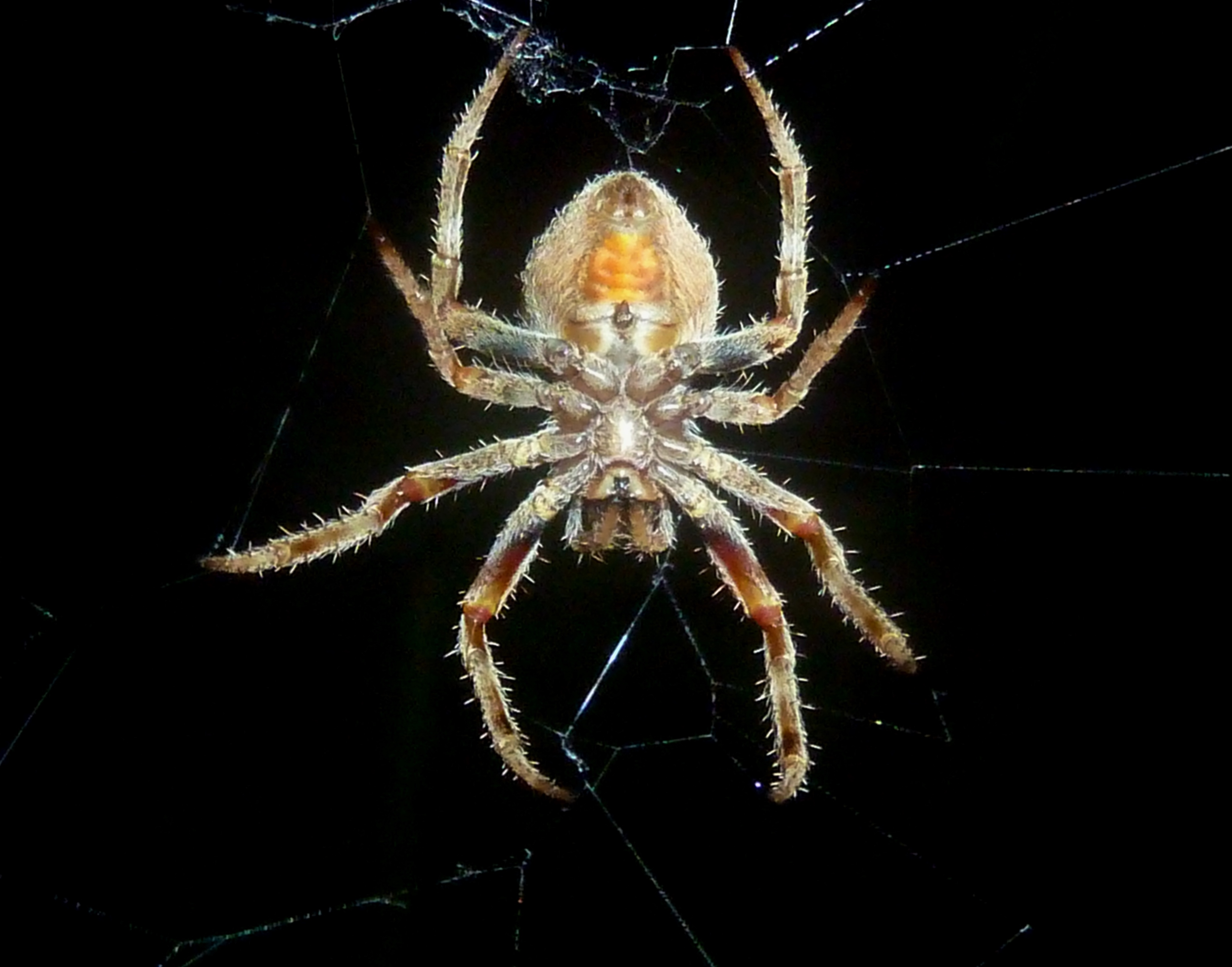

Conservation status
- Least Concern (SANBI Red List)

Scientific classification
- Kingdom: Animalia
- Phylum: Arthropoda
- Subphylum: Chelicerata
- Class: Arachnida
- Order: Araneae
- Infraorder: Araneomorphae
- Family: Araneidae
- Genus: Neoscona
- Species: N. triangula

Binomial name
- Neoscona triangula (Keyserling, 1864)

Synonyms
- Epeira nocturna Vinson, 1863; Epeira kerstenii Gerstaecker, 1873; Epeira melanopa Gerstaecker, 1873; Epeira obscura Blackwall, 1877; Epeira locuples Butler, 1880; Epeira cerviniventris Simon, 1884; Epeira annulata Lenz, 1891; Araneus haploscapus Pocock, 1898; Aranea sub-bituberculata Thorell, 1899; Aranea danensis Strand, 1906; Araneus fernandensis Simon, 1907; Aranea kibonotensis Tullgren, 1910; Aranea formicae Tullgren, 1910; Aranea cruciferoides Tullgren, 1910; Araneus katangae Giltay, 1935; Neoscona platyparomma Caporiacco, 1939; Araneus nigrostriatus Caporiacco, 1947; Neoscona larbada Roberts, 1983

= Neoscona triangula =

Red-spotted Neoscona Orb-Web Spider

Species of spider

Neoscona triangula is a species of spider in the family Araneidae. It is commonly known as the red-spotted Neoscona orb-web spider.

== Distribution ==
Neoscona triangula has a very wide global distribution, known from Cape Verde to India and with a wide distribution throughout Africa.

In South Africa, the species is recorded from all nine provinces at altitudes ranging from 7 to 1,781 m above sea level and occurs in more than 20 protected areas.

== Habitat and ecology ==
This large species makes orb-webs in vegetation at night and removes them early in the morning, resting on plants during the day. The species is very common in gardens during the summer season. The species has been sampled from the Forest, Grassland, Indian Ocean Coastal Belt, Nama Karoo, Savanna, and Thicket biomes. The species was also sampled from crops such as avocado, macadamia and pecans orchards, onion, sorghum and tomato fields. The species was also sampled from Burkea africana in Nylsvley Nature Reserve.

== Description ==
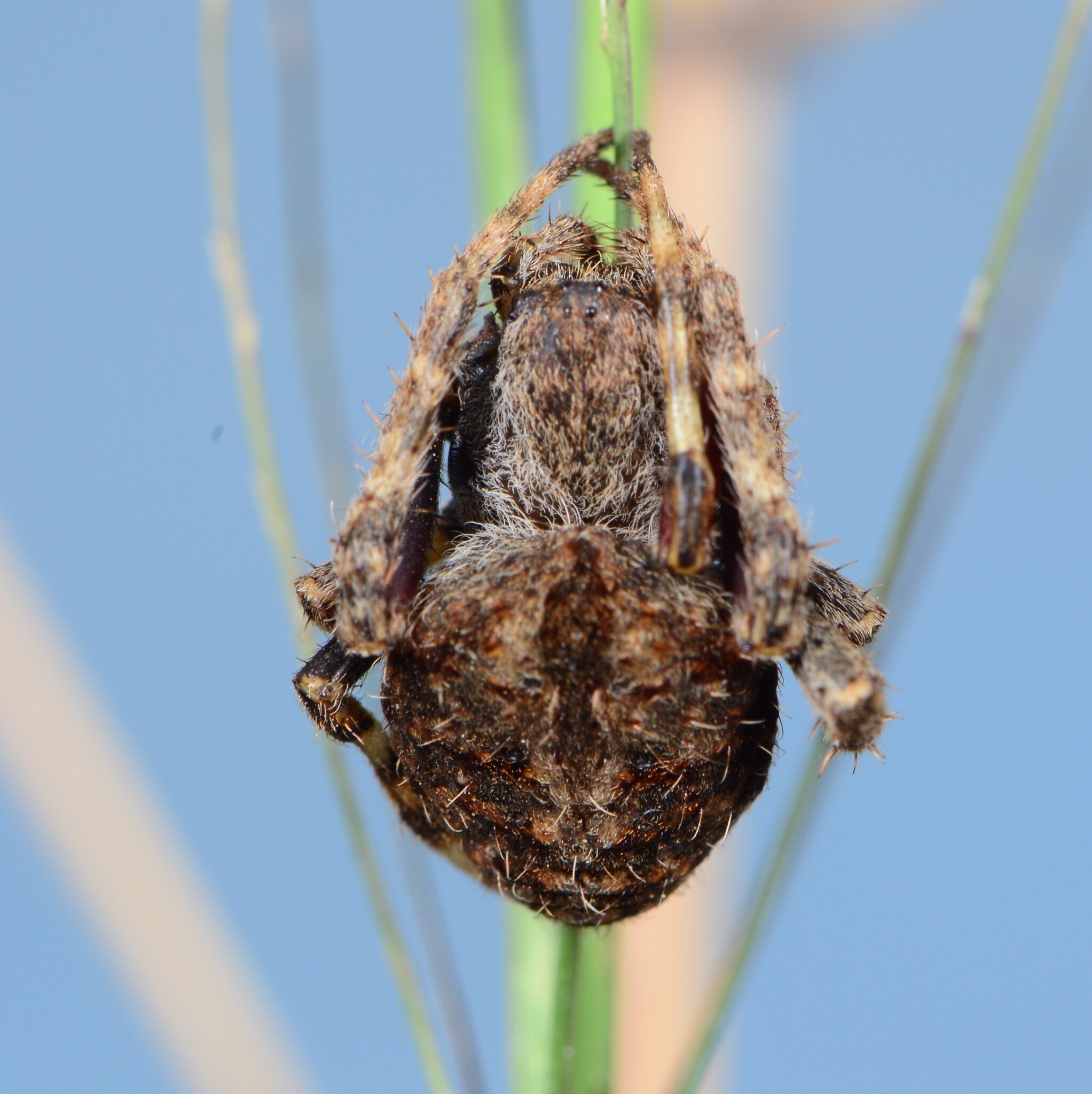
female

Neoscona triangula is known from both sexes. These are large spiders measuring 9-17 mm in body length

== Conservation ==
Neoscona triangula is listed as Least Concern by the South African National Biodiversity Institute due to its wide geographical range. There are no significant threats to the species. The species has been sampled from more than 20 protected areas including Karoo National Park, Roodeplaatdam Nature Reserve, Ndumo Game Reserve, Mpetsane Conservation Estate, and Addo Elephant National Park.

== Taxonomy ==
The species was originally described by Keyserling in 1864 as Epeira triangula. It was revised by Grasshoff in 1986, who synonymized numerous species including Araneus fernandensis, A. formicae, A. haploscapus, A. katangae, A. locuples, A. melanopus, A. platyparomma, A. subbituberculatus, Neoscona danensis, N. kersteni, and N. larbada.
