= Lampertia =

Scientific classification
- Kingdom: Animalia
- Phylum: Arthropoda
- Subphylum: Chelicerata
- Class: Arachnida
- Order: Araneae
- Infraorder: Araneomorphae
- Family: Thomisidae
- Genus: Lampertia; Strand, 1907
- Species: L. pulchra

Binomial name
- Lampertia pulchra Strand, 1907

Genus of spiders

Lampertia is a genus of spiders in the family Thomisidae. It was first described in 1907 by Strand. As of 2017, it contains only one species, Lampertia pulchra, found in Madagascar.
