= Hovops =

Scientific classification
- Kingdom: Animalia
- Phylum: Arthropoda
- Subphylum: Chelicerata
- Class: Arachnida
- Order: Araneae
- Infraorder: Araneomorphae
- Family: Selenopidae
- Genus: Hovops; Benoit, 1968

Type species
- H. pusillus (Simon, 1887)

Species
- 11, see text

Genus of spiders

Hovops is a genus of Malagasy wall spiders that was first described by P. L. G. Benoit in 1968.

== Species ==
As of September 2019 it contains eleven species, found on Madagascar:

- Hovops antakarana Rodríguez & Corronca, 2014 – Madagascar
- Hovops betsileo Corronca & Rodríguez, 2011 – Madagascar
- Hovops ikongo Rodríguez & Corronca, 2014 – Madagascar
- Hovops legrasi (Simon, 1887) – Madagascar
- Hovops lidiae Corronca & Rodríguez, 2011 – Madagascar
- Hovops madagascariensis (Vinson, 1863) – Madagascar
- Hovops mariensis (Strand, 1908) – Madagascar
- Hovops menabe Rodríguez & Corronca, 2014 – Madagascar
- Hovops merina Corronca & Rodríguez, 2011 – Madagascar
- Hovops pusillus (Simon, 1887) (type) – Madagascar
- Hovops vezo Rodríguez & Corronca, 2014 – Madagascar
