= Pachypoessa =

Scientific classification
- Kingdom: Animalia
- Phylum: Arthropoda
- Subphylum: Chelicerata
- Class: Arachnida
- Order: Araneae
- Infraorder: Araneomorphae
- Family: Salticidae
- Genus: Pachypoessa; Simon, 1902
- Species: P. lacertosa

Binomial name
- Pachypoessa lacertosa Simon, 1902

Genus of spiders

Pachypoessa is a monotypic genus of jumping spiders containing the single species, Pachypoessa lacertosa. It was first described by Eugène Louis Simon in 1902, and is only found in Africa.
