= Pyresthesis =

Scientific classification
- Domain: Eukaryota
- Kingdom: Animalia
- Phylum: Arthropoda
- Subphylum: Chelicerata
- Class: Arachnida
- Order: Araneae
- Infraorder: Araneomorphae
- Family: Thomisidae
- Genus: Pyresthesis
- Species: P. laevis

Binomial name
- Pyresthesis laevis (Keyserling, 1877)

Genus of spiders

Pyresthesis is a genus of spiders in the family Thomisidae. It was first described in 1880 by Butler. As of 2017, it contains only one species, Pyresthesis laevis, found in Madagascar.
