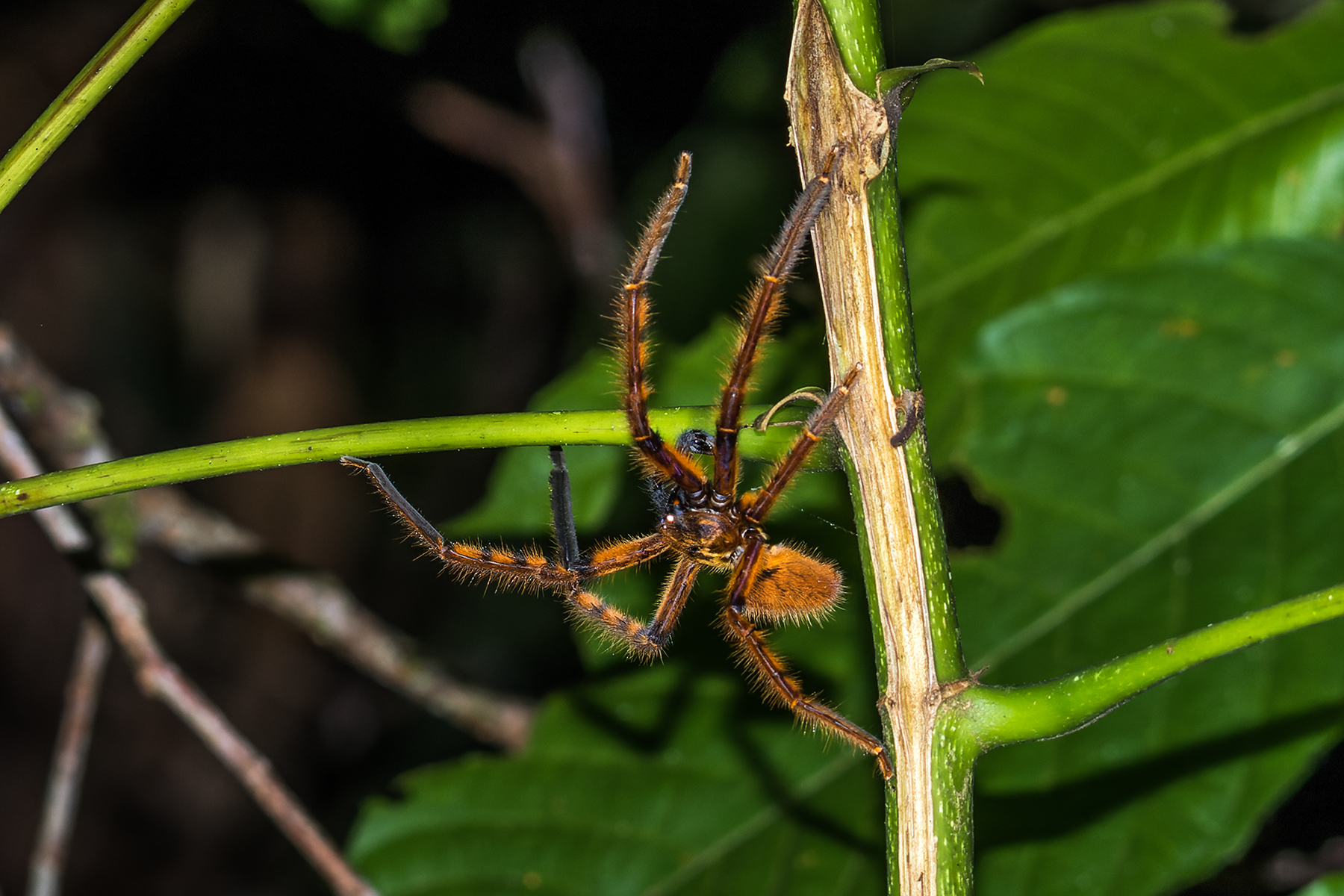
- Rhitymna pinangensis

Scientific classification
- Kingdom: Animalia
- Phylum: Arthropoda
- Subphylum: Chelicerata
- Class: Arachnida
- Order: Araneae
- Infraorder: Araneomorphae
- Family: Sparassidae
- Genus: Rhitymna; Simon

Species
- 21, see text

= Rhitymna =

Genus of spiders

Rhitymna is a genus of huntsman spiders described in 1897 by Eugène Simon. Members of this genus can be distinguished by a number of characteristics, but it is most often confused with Olios species, many of which also have the Y-shaped pattern on the dorsal opisthosoma.

== Species ==
As of 2022, the genus Rhitymna comprises 21 species:

- Rhitymna ambae Jäger, 2003 - Indonesia (Java)
- Rhitymna bicolana (Barrion & Litsinger, 1995) - Philippines
- Rhitymna cursor (Thorell, 1894) - Singapore, Indonesia (Java)
- Rhitymna deelemanae Jäger, 2003 - Indonesia (Bali, Sumba)
- Rhitymna flava Schmidt & Krause, 1994 - Comoros
- Rhitymna flores Jäger, 2019 - Indonesia (Flores)
- Rhitymna gerdmangel Jäger, 2019 - Thailand, Malaysia
- Rhitymna imerinensis (Vinson, 1863) - Madagascar
- Rhitymna kananggar Jäger, 2003 - Indonesia (Sumba)
- Rhitymna macilenta Quan & Liu, 2012 - China (Hainan)
- Rhitymna merianae Jäger, 2019 - Indonesia (Bali)
- Rhitymna occidentalis Jäger, 2003 - Sri Lanka
- Rhitymna pinangensis (Thorell, 1891) - Thailand, Malaysia, Indonesia (Sumatra, Borneo, Java)
- Rhitymna plana Jäger, 2003 - Laos, Vietnam, Cambodia
- Rhitymna pseudokumanga (Barrion & Litsinger, 1995) - Philippines
- Rhitymna senckenbergi Jäger, 2019 - Philippines (Negros)
- Rhitymna simplex Jäger, 2003 - Malaysia (Borneo)
- Rhitymna tangi Quan & Liu, 2012 - China (Hainan), Laos
- Rhitymna tuhodnigra (Barrion & Litsinger, 1995) - Philippines
- Rhitymna verruca (Wang, 1991) - China, Laos, Vietnam, Thailand
- Rhitymna xanthopus Simon, 1901 - Malaysia
