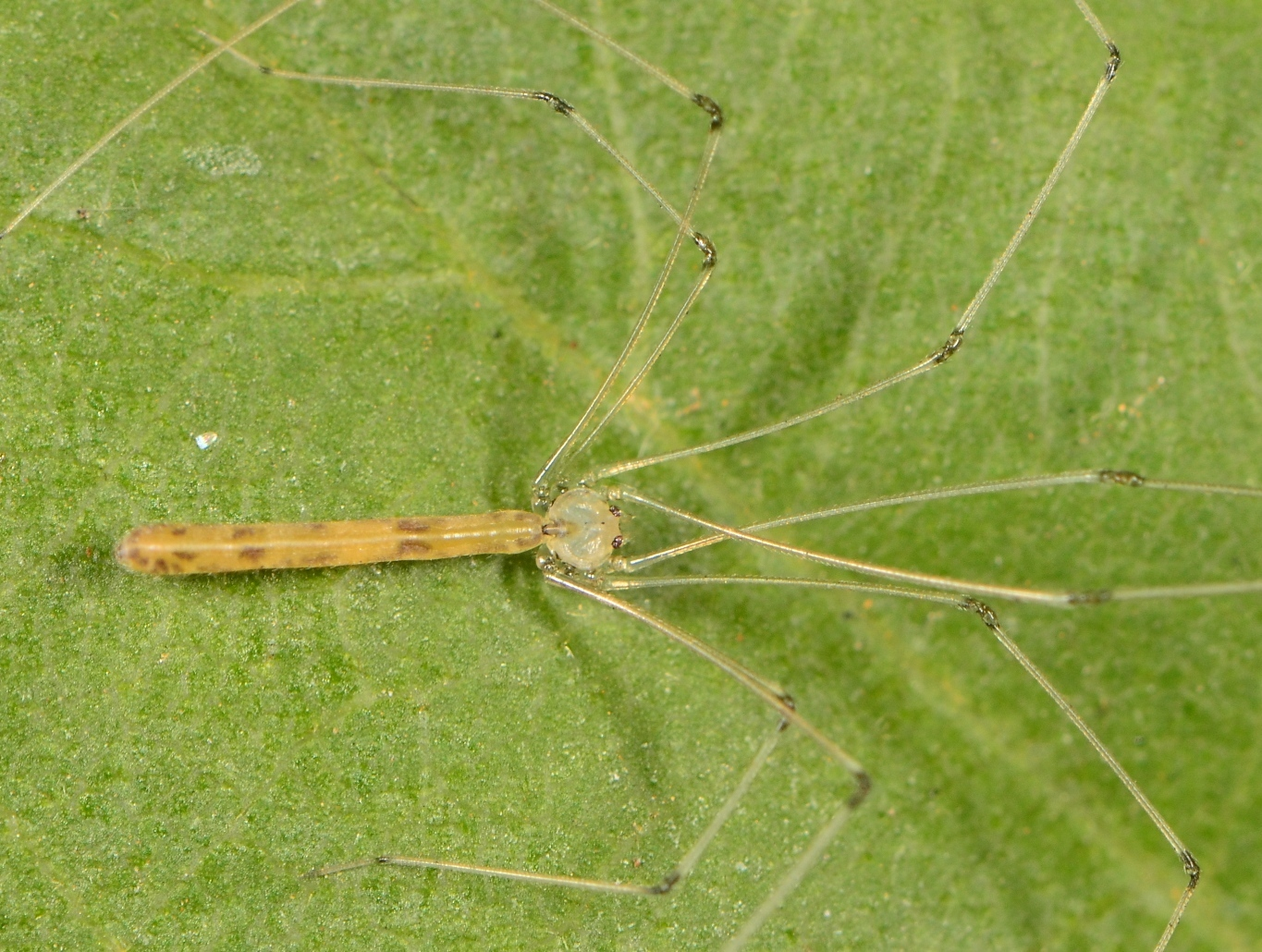
- female L. gracilis
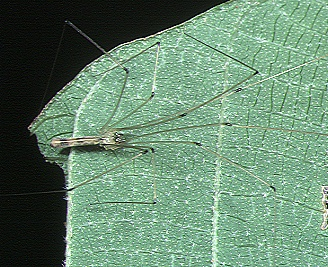
- male L. tanikawai

Scientific classification
- Kingdom: Animalia
- Phylum: Arthropoda
- Subphylum: Chelicerata
- Class: Arachnida
- Order: Araneae
- Infraorder: Araneomorphae
- Family: Pholcidae
- Genus: Leptopholcus; Simon, 1893

Type species
- L. signifer Simon, 1893

Species
- 22, see text

= Leptopholcus =

Genus of spiders

Leptopholcus is a genus of cellar spiders that was first described by Eugène Louis Simon in 1893.

Its described species are found in Africa and Asia.

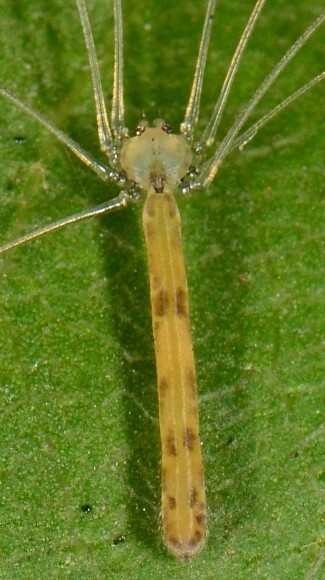

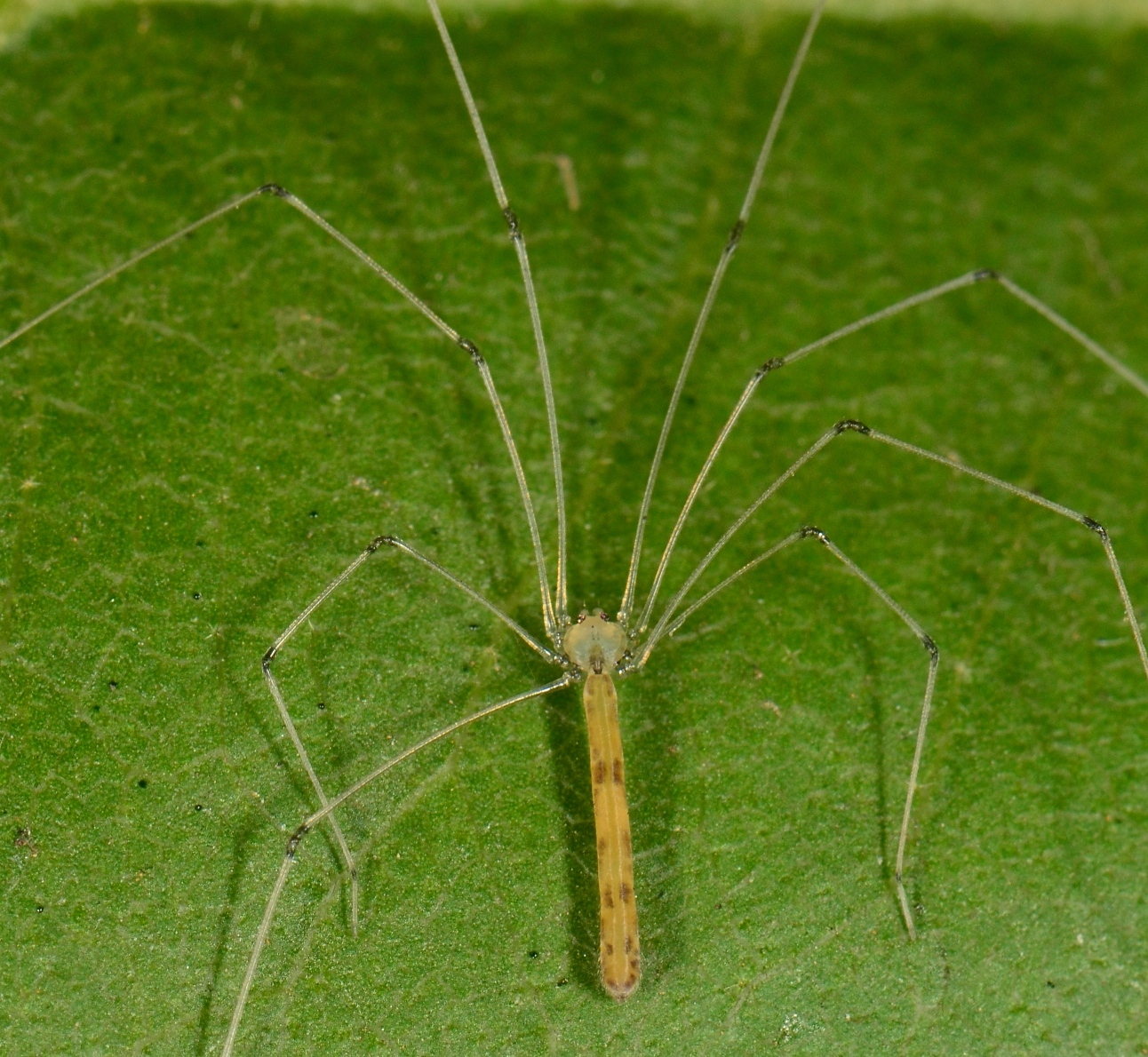
female L. gracilis

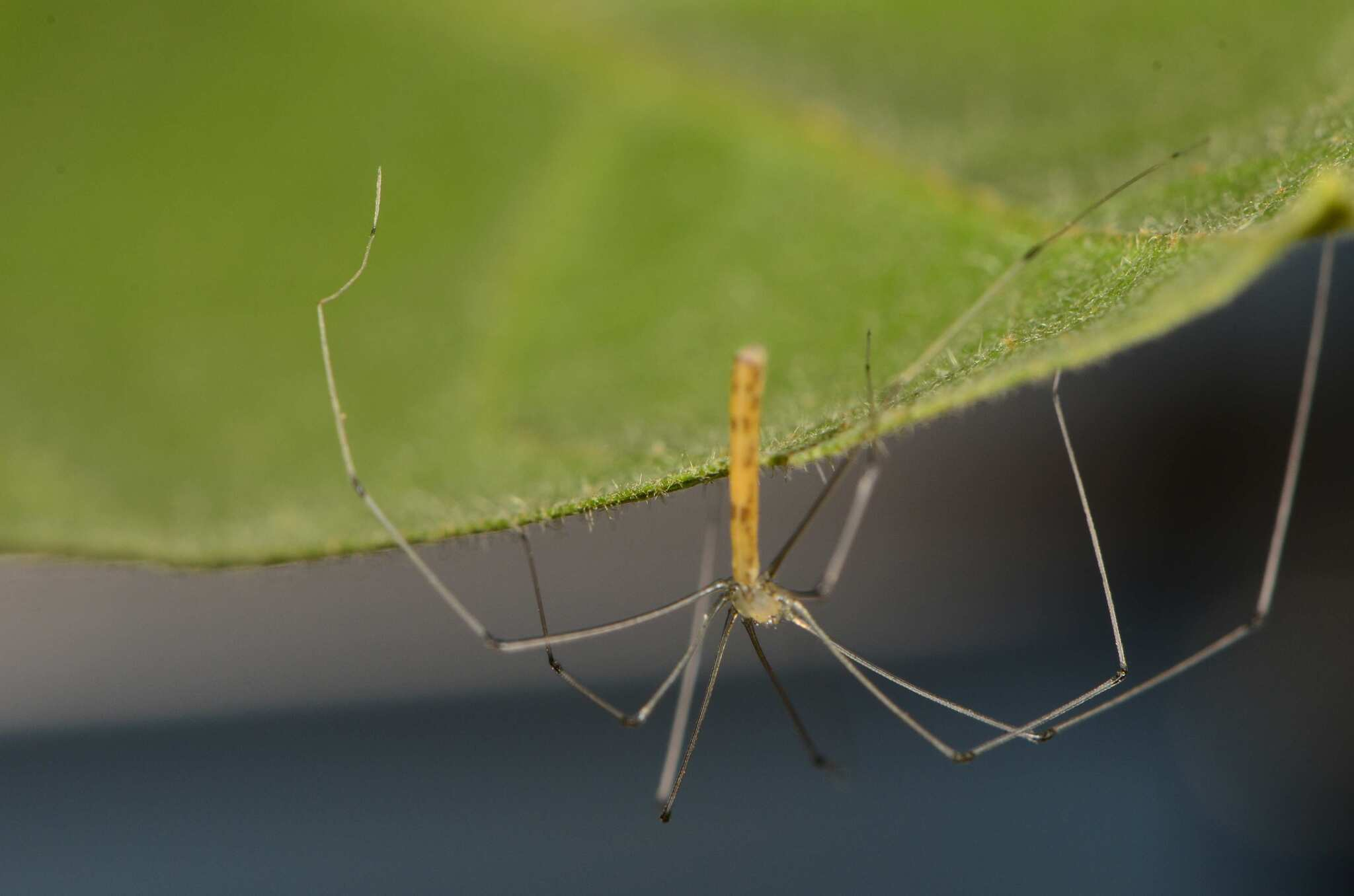

== Species ==
As of October 2025, this genus includes 22 species:

- Leptopholcus borneensis Deeleman-Reinhold, 1986 – Thailand, Indonesia (Borneo, Lesser Sunda Islands)
- Leptopholcus budongo Huber, 2011 – DR Congo, Kenya, Uganda
- Leptopholcus debakkeri Huber, 2011 – Congo
- Leptopholcus dioscoridis Deeleman-Reinhold & van Harten, 2001 – Yemen (Socotra)
- Leptopholcus dschang Huber, 2011 – Cameroon
- Leptopholcus gabonicus Huber, 2014 – Gabon
- Leptopholcus gracilis Berland, 1920 – Somalia, Kenya, Tanzania, Mozambique, South Africa
- Leptopholcus griswoldi Huber, 2011 – Madagascar
- Leptopholcus guineensis Millot, 1941 – West Africa
- Leptopholcus gurnahi Huber, 2011 – Tanzania
- Leptopholcus huongson Huber, 2011 – China, Thailand, Vietnam
- Leptopholcus kandy Huber, 2011 – India, Sri Lanka
- Leptopholcus kintampo Huber & Kwapong, 2013 – Ghana
- Leptopholcus lokobe Huber, 2011 – Madagascar
- Leptopholcus ngazidja Huber, 2011 – Madagascar, Comoros
- Leptopholcus obo Huber, 2011 – São Tomé and Príncipe
- Leptopholcus podophthalmus (Simon, 1893) – Sri Lanka to China, Singapore
- Leptopholcus sakalavensis Millot, 1946 – Madagascar
- Leptopholcus signifer Simon, 1893 – Angola, Kenya (type species)
- Leptopholcus talatakely Huber, 2011 – Madagascar
- Leptopholcus tanikawai Irie, 1999 – Japan, China
- Leptopholcus tipula (Simon, 1907) – West and Central Africa

== See also ==
- List of Pholcidae species
