= Soelteria =

Scientific classification
- Domain: Eukaryota
- Kingdom: Animalia
- Phylum: Arthropoda
- Subphylum: Chelicerata
- Class: Arachnida
- Order: Araneae
- Infraorder: Araneomorphae
- Family: Thomisidae
- Genus: Soelteria
- Species: S. nigra

Binomial name
- Soelteria nigra Dahl, 1907

Genus of spiders

Soelteria is a genus of spiders in the family Thomisidae. It was first described in 1907 by Dahl. As of 2017, it contains only one species, Soelteria nigra, found in Madagascar.
