= Tmeticides =

Scientific classification
- Kingdom: Animalia
- Phylum: Arthropoda
- Subphylum: Chelicerata
- Class: Arachnida
- Order: Araneae
- Infraorder: Araneomorphae
- Family: Linyphiidae
- Genus: Tmeticides; Strand, 1907
- Species: T. araneiformis

Binomial name
- Tmeticides araneiformis Strand, 1907

Genus of spiders

Tmeticides is a monotypic genus of Malagasy sheet weavers containing the single species, Tmeticides araneiformis. It was first described by Embrik Strand in 1907, and is only found on Madagascar.
