= Zelotes bastardi =

Conservation status
- Least Concern (SANBI Red List)

Scientific classification
- Kingdom: Animalia
- Phylum: Arthropoda
- Subphylum: Chelicerata
- Class: Arachnida
- Order: Araneae
- Infraorder: Araneomorphae
- Family: Gnaphosidae
- Genus: Zelotes
- Species: Z. bastardi

Binomial name
- Zelotes bastardi (Simon, 1896)

Synonyms
- Melanophora bastardi Simon, 1896; Zelotes vespertilionis Tucker, 1923

Species of spider

Zelotes bastardi is a species of spider in the family Gnaphosidae.

== Distribution ==
Zelotes bastardi is an African endemic distributed across the Democratic Republic of the Congo, Zimbabwe, Madagascar, and South Africa. In South Africa, it is known from three provinces, Gauteng, Limpopo, and Mpumalanga, at altitudes ranging from 534 to 1,333 m above sea level.

== Habitat and ecology ==
The species inhabits the Grassland and Savanna biomes. These are free-running spiders that are found under stones during the day. The species has also been sampled from cabbage and cotton fields.

== Conservation ==
Zelotes bastardi is listed as Least Concern by the South African National Biodiversity Institute due to its wide geographic range. There are no significant threats to the species, and it is protected in Malebogo Nature Reserve and Blouberg Nature Reserve.

== Taxonomy ==
The species was originally described by Simon in 1896 from Madagascar as Melanophora bastardi. Tucker described Zelotes vespertilionis in 1923, which was later synonymized with Z. bastardi by FitzPatrick in 2007. The species is known from both sexes.
