= Staianus =

Scientific classification
- Kingdom: Animalia
- Phylum: Arthropoda
- Subphylum: Chelicerata
- Class: Arachnida
- Order: Araneae
- Infraorder: Araneomorphae
- Family: Sparassidae
- Genus: Staianus; Simon, 1889
- Species: S. acuminatus

Binomial name
- Staianus acuminatus Simon, 1889

Genus of spiders

Staianus is a monotypic genus of Malagasy huntsman spiders containing the single species, Staianus acuminatus. It was first described by Eugène Louis Simon in 1889, and is found on Madagascar.
