= Megaloremmius =

Scientific classification
- Kingdom: Animalia
- Phylum: Arthropoda
- Subphylum: Chelicerata
- Class: Arachnida
- Order: Araneae
- Infraorder: Araneomorphae
- Family: Sparassidae
- Genus: Megaloremmius; Simon, 1903
- Species: M. leo

Binomial name
- Megaloremmius leo Simon, 1903

Genus of spiders

Megaloremmius (sometimes called the “lion spider”) is a monotypic genus of Malagasy huntsman spiders containing the single species, Megaloremmius leo. It was first described by Eugène Louis Simon in 1903, and is found on Madagascar.
