= Phaulostylus =

Scientific classification
- Kingdom: Animalia
- Phylum: Arthropoda
- Subphylum: Chelicerata
- Class: Arachnida
- Order: Araneae
- Infraorder: Araneomorphae
- Family: Salticidae
- Subfamily: Salticinae
- Genus: Phaulostylus; Simon, 1902

Type species
- P. furcifer Simon, 1902

Species
- 4, see text

Genus of spiders

Phaulostylus is a genus of Malagasy jumping spiders that was first described by Eugène Louis Simon in 1902.

== Species ==
As of August 2019 it contains four species, found only on Madagascar:

- Phaulostylus furcifer Simon, 1902 (type) – Madagascar
- Phaulostylus grammicus Simon, 1902 – Madagascar
- Phaulostylus grandidieri Simon, 1902 – Madagascar
- Phaulostylus leucolophus Simon, 1902 – Madagascar
