= Apyretina =

Scientific classification
- Kingdom: Animalia
- Phylum: Arthropoda
- Subphylum: Chelicerata
- Class: Arachnida
- Order: Araneae
- Infraorder: Araneomorphae
- Family: Thomisidae
- Genus: Apyretina; Strand, 1929

Type species
- A. pentagona (Simon, 1895)

Species
- 5, see text

Genus of spiders

Apyretina is a genus of African crab spiders that was first described by Embrik Strand in 1929.

== Species ==
As of June 2020 it contains five species, found on Madagascar:

- Apyretina catenulata (Simon, 1903) – Madagascar
- Apyretina nigra (Simon, 1903) – Madagascar
- Apyretina pentagona (Simon, 1895) (type) – Madagascar
- Apyretina quinquenotata (Simon, 1903) – Madagascar
- Apyretina tessera (Simon, 1903) – Madagascar

== See also ==
- List of Thomisidae species
