= Poessa =

Scientific classification
- Kingdom: Animalia
- Phylum: Arthropoda
- Subphylum: Chelicerata
- Class: Arachnida
- Order: Araneae
- Infraorder: Araneomorphae
- Family: Salticidae
- Genus: Poessa; Simon, 1902
- Species: P. argenteofrenata

Binomial name
- Poessa argenteofrenata Simon, 1902

Genus of spiders

Poessa is a monotypic genus of Malagasy jumping spiders containing the single species, Poessa argenteofrenata. It was first described by Eugène Louis Simon in 1902, and is only found on Madagascar.
