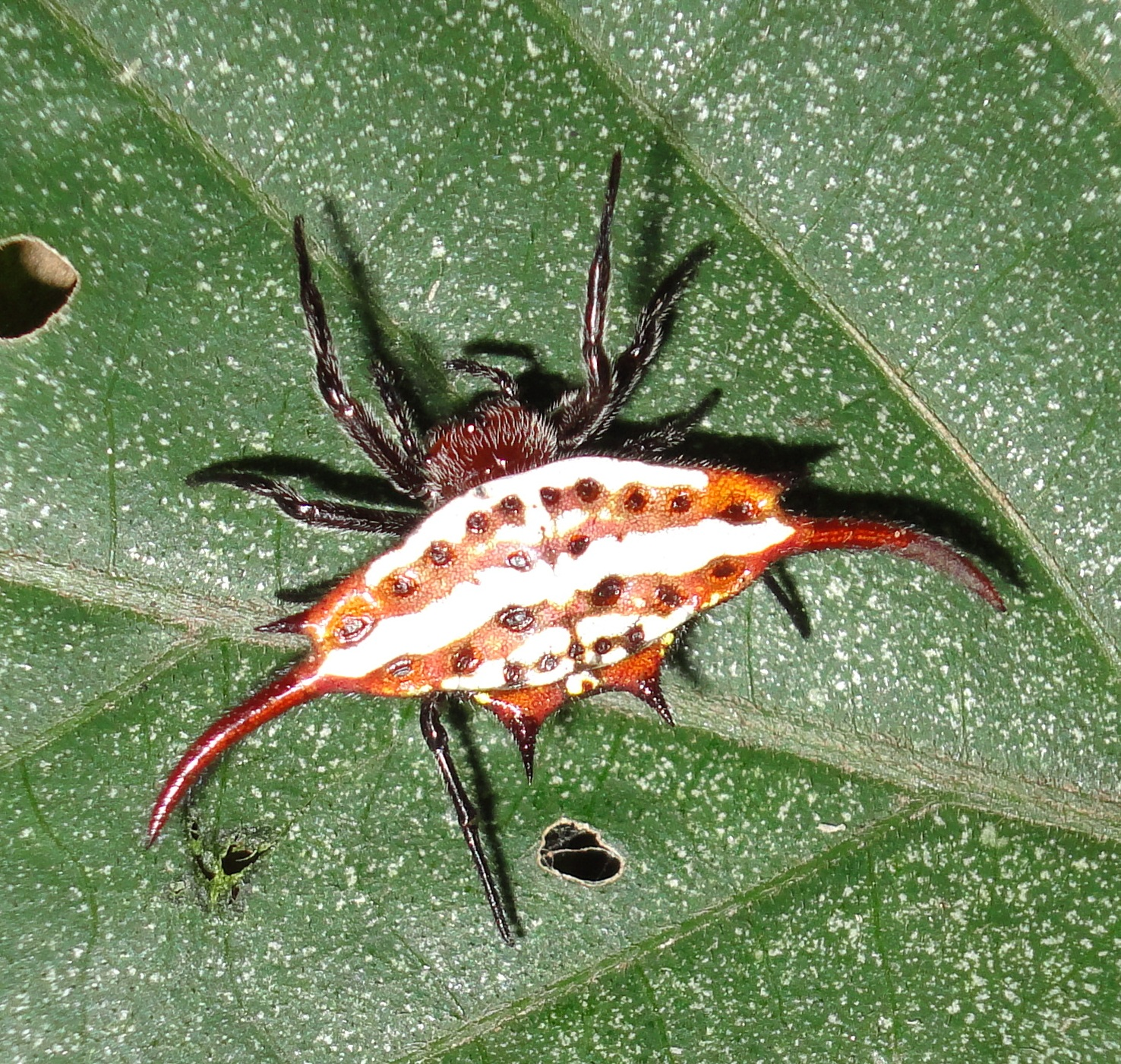
- Female G. v. versicolor in Burman Bush

Scientific classification
- Kingdom: Animalia
- Phylum: Arthropoda
- Subphylum: Chelicerata
- Class: Arachnida
- Order: Araneae
- Infraorder: Araneomorphae
- Family: Araneidae
- Genus: Gasteracantha
- Species: G. versicolor

Binomial name
- Gasteracantha versicolor (Walckenaer, 1841)

Synonyms
- Plectana versicolor Walckenaer, 1841; Gasteracantha scapha Gerstaecker, 1873; Gasteracantha versicolor nigristerna Caporiacco, 1941

= Gasteracantha versicolor =

Common Kite Spider

Species of spider

Gasteracantha versicolor is a species of diurnal orb weaver spider in the family Araneidae, found in Central, East, and Southern Africa. It is commonly known as the common kite spider.

== Distribution ==
Gasteracantha versicolor is widespread throughout Africa from Uganda to South Africa, including Madagascar.

In South Africa, the species occurs in six provinces across a very large geographical range at altitudes from 7 to 1,710 m above sea level.

The South African distribution includes Eastern Cape, Gauteng, KwaZulu-Natal, Limpopo, Mpumalanga, and Western Cape provinces. Notable localities include East London, Coffee Bay, Port Elizabeth, Durban, Kruger National Park, Nelspruit, and Table Mountain National Park.

== Habitat and ecology ==
Gasteracantha versicolor is an orb-web dweller commonly found in warmer tropical regions. The spiders usually construct their orb-webs high between trees or tall shrubs above the observer's eye level. The bridge line is frequently longer than the orb part, giving the impression that the spider is floating in space. The web is sometimes decorated with tufts of silk. The spiders are active during the day and do not remove their webs.

The species has been sampled from the Fynbos, Forest, Grassland and Savanna biomes. The species has also been recorded from citrus orchards.

== Description ==
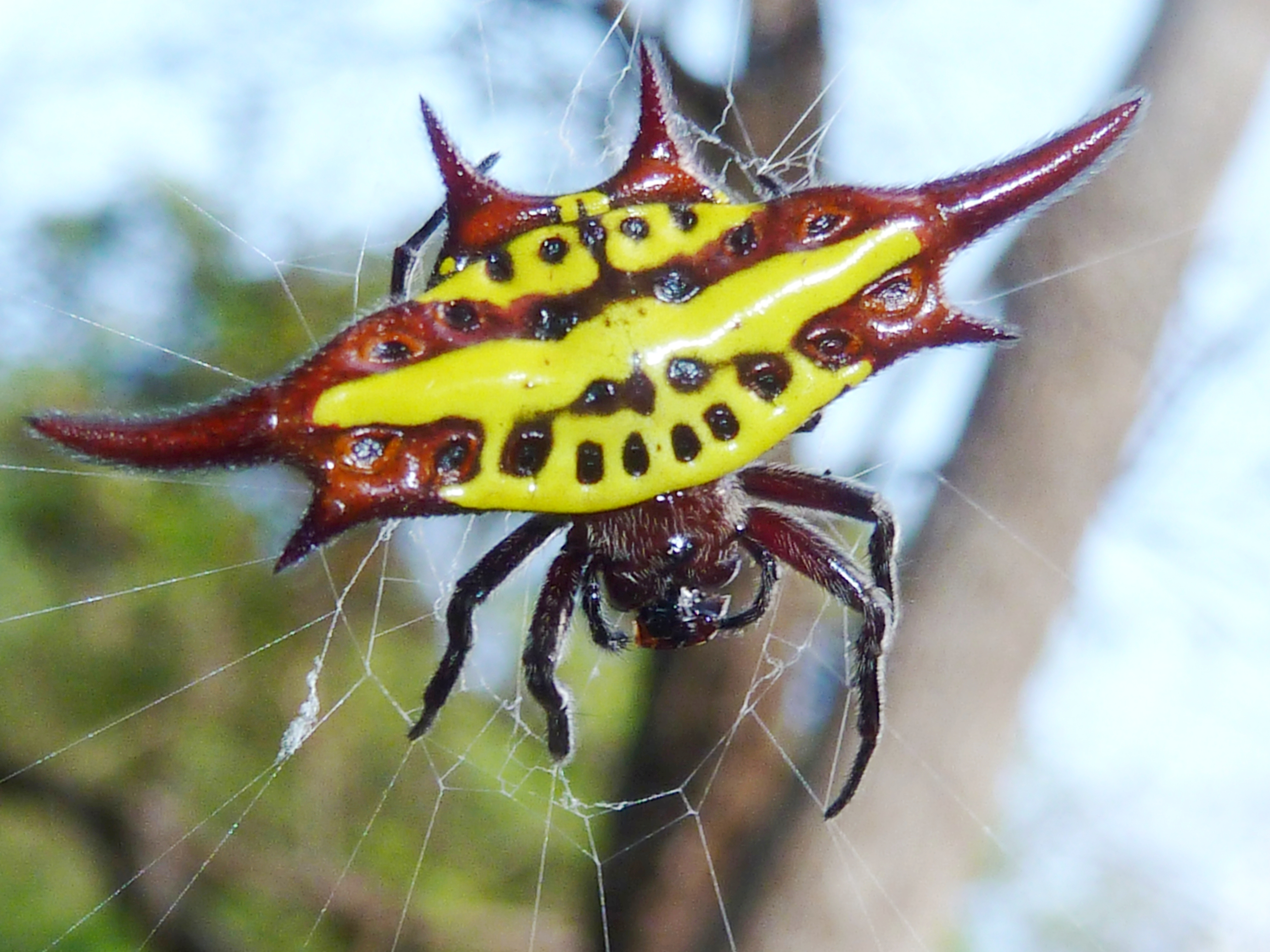
female in Krantzkloof ravine

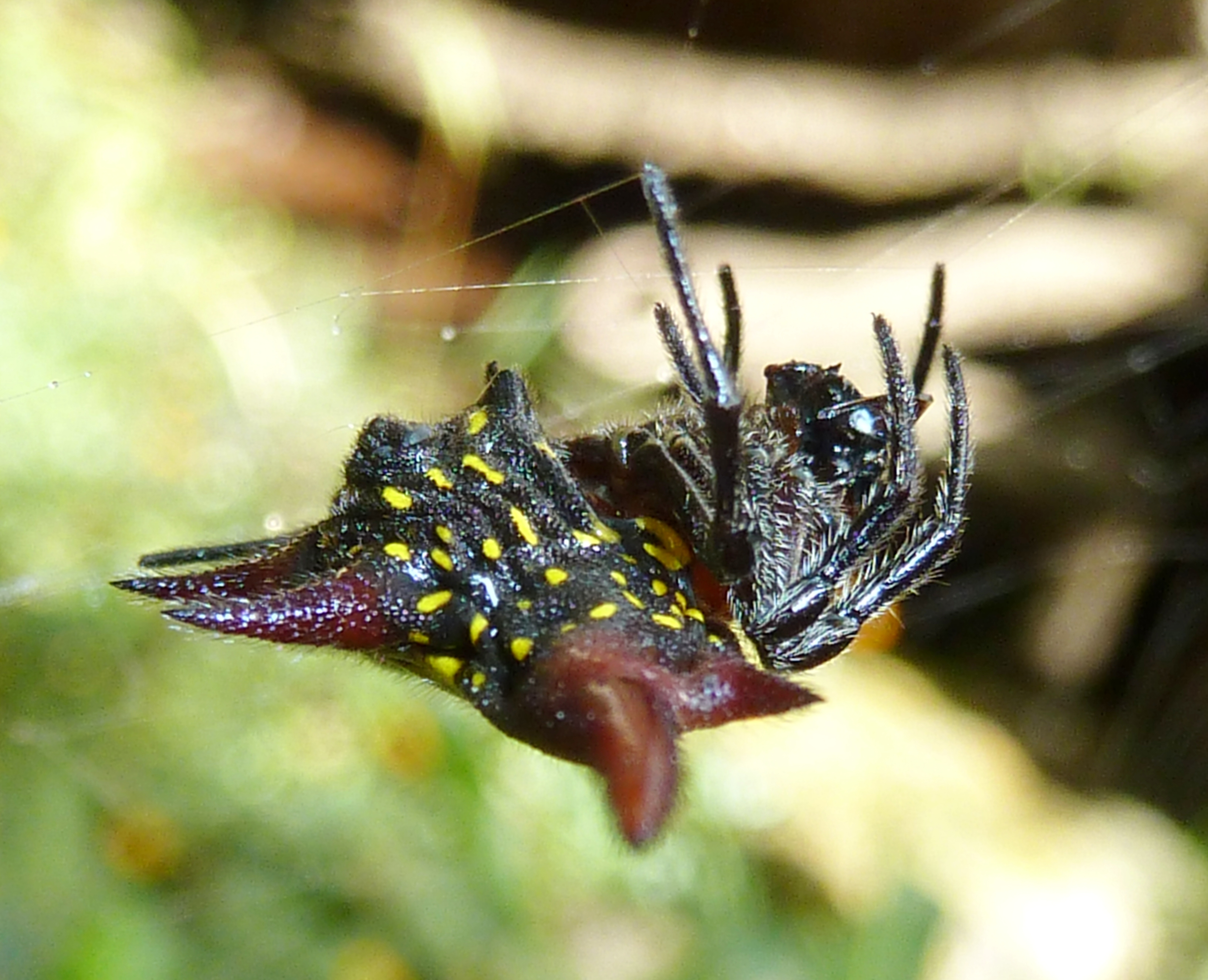
spotted underside of abdomen

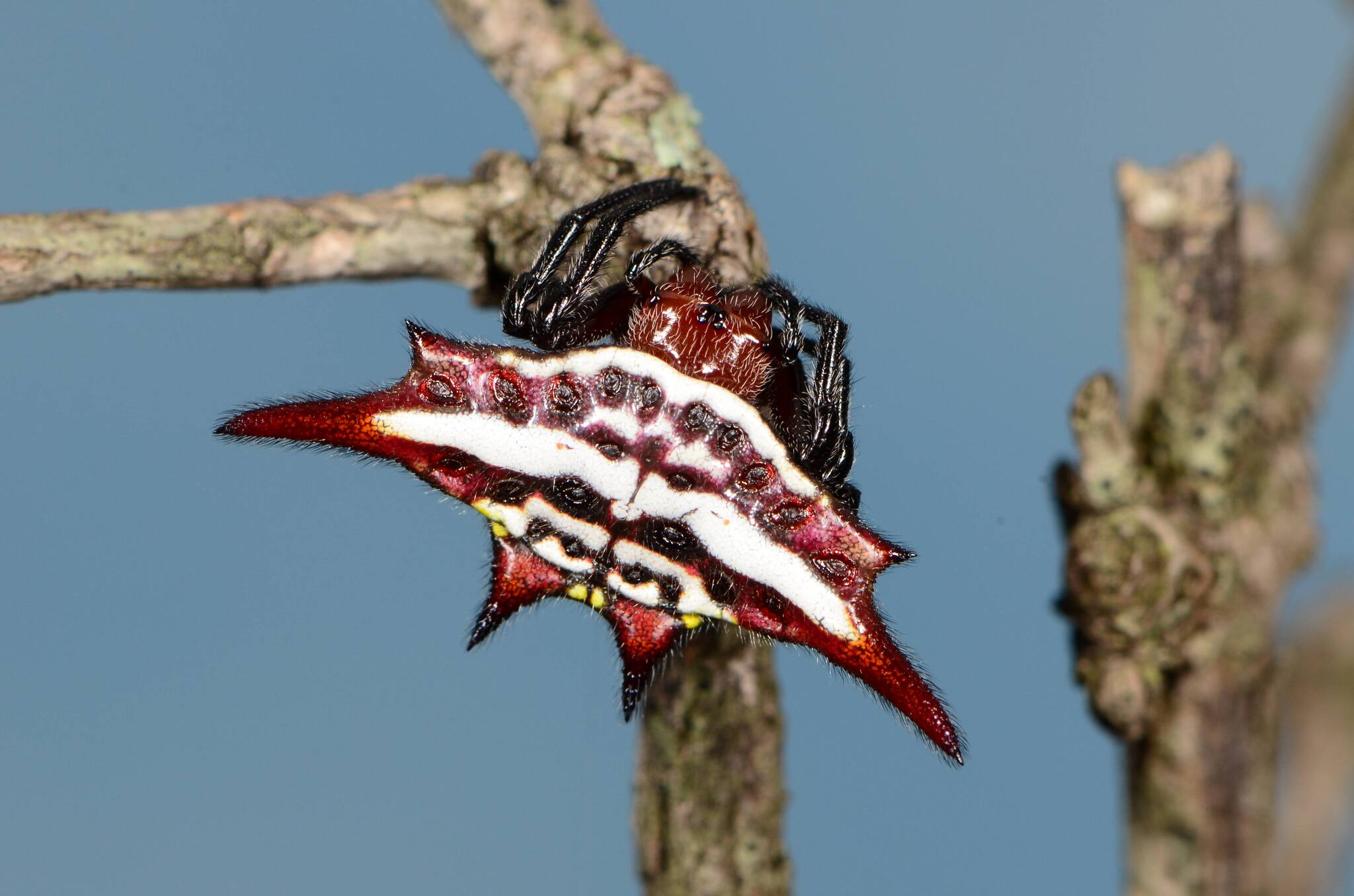
female

The female is 8 to 10 mm long, with a large, glossy and brightly coloured abdomen, like others of their genus. The hardened (sclerotised) abdomen projects over the cephalothorax and has six peripheral spines, with the lateral pair medium to long and slightly recurved in this species.

Males are much smaller, less colourful and lack the thorny abdominal projections.

The web has densely spaced radii and an open hub, and may be placed from near ground level to several meters up. Like most spiders, their venom is not known to be dangerous to humans.

== Taxonomy ==
The species is known from both sexes.

== Races ==
- G. v. avaratrae Emerit, 1974 – Madagascar
- G. v. formosa Vinson, 1863 – Madagascar
- G. v. versicolor (Walckenaer, 1841) – mainland Africa
