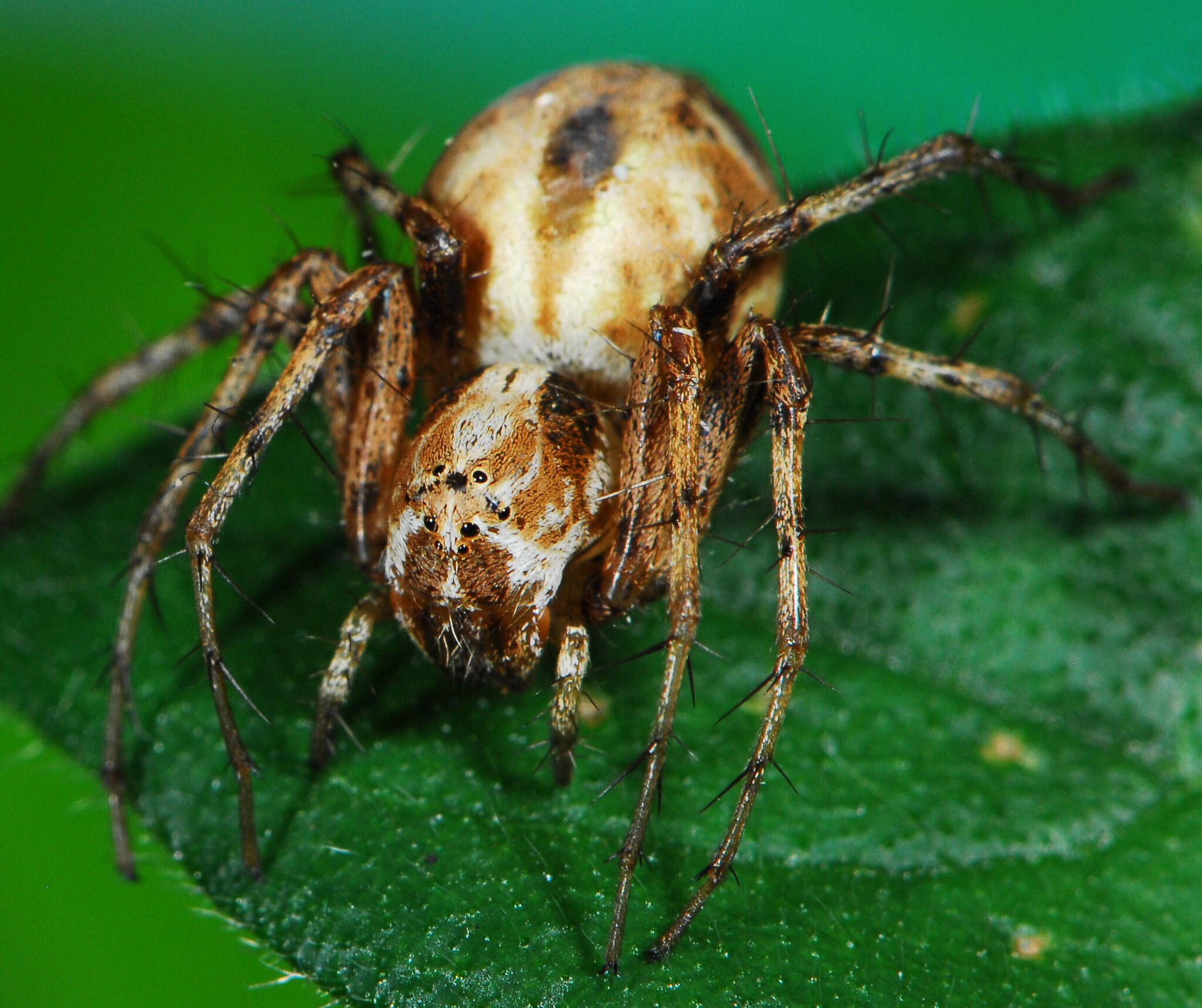
- female
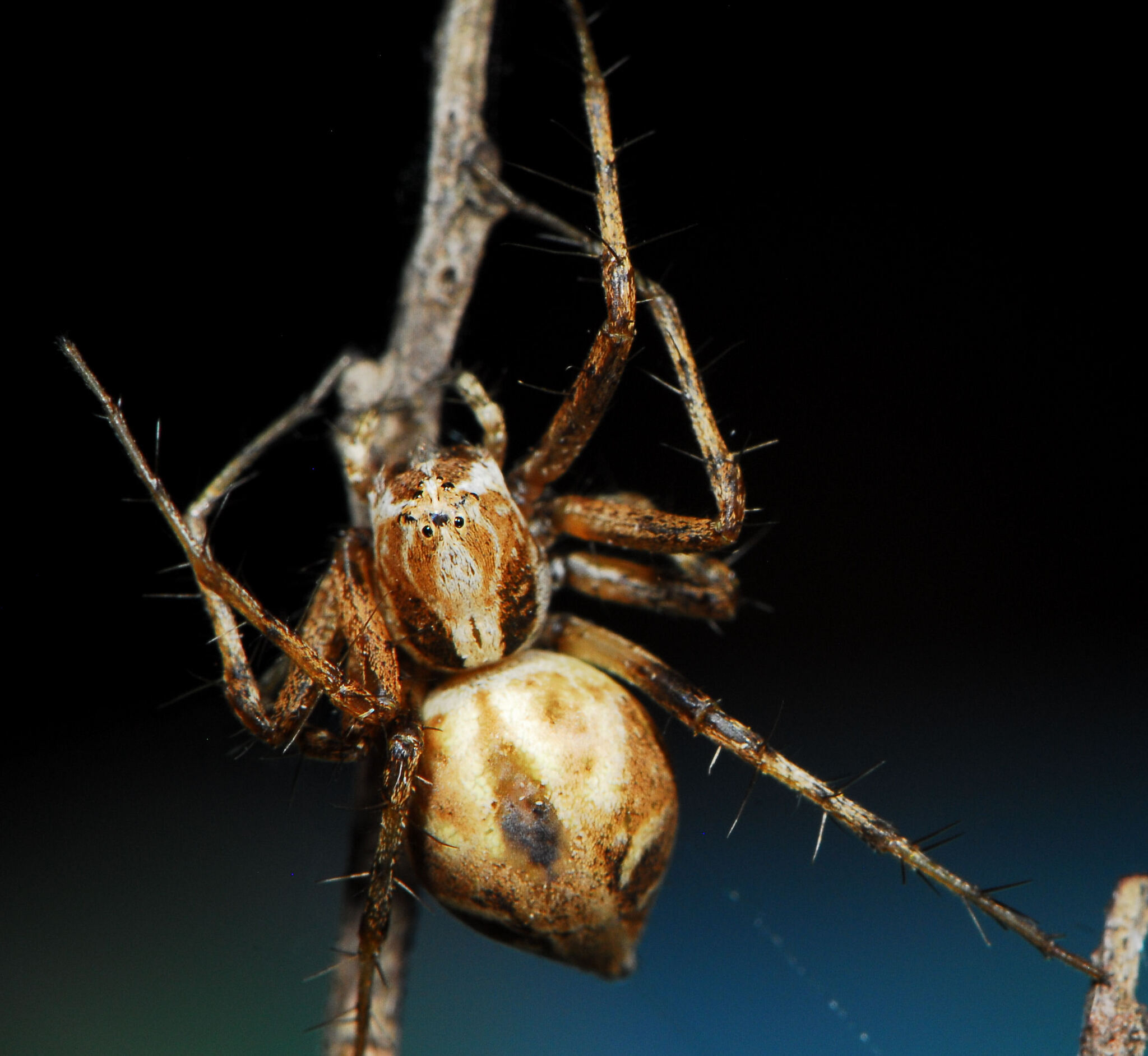
- female

Scientific classification
- Kingdom: Animalia
- Phylum: Arthropoda
- Subphylum: Chelicerata
- Class: Arachnida
- Order: Araneae
- Infraorder: Araneomorphae
- Family: Oxyopidae
- Genus: Oxyopes
- Species: O. pallidecoloratus

Binomial name
- Oxyopes pallidecoloratus Strand, 1906

= Oxyopes pallidecoloratus =

Dark Banded Lynx Spider

Species of spider

Oxyopes pallidecoloratus is a species of spider in the family Oxyopidae. It is commonly known as the dark banded lynx spider.

== Distribution ==
Oxyopes pallidecoloratus occurs in Ethiopia, Democratic Republic of the Congo, Madagascar, and southern Africa. In South Africa, the species has been recorded from seven provinces at altitudes ranging from 54 to 1,601 m above sea level.

== Habitat and ecology ==
The species is commonly found on grasses across multiple biomes including Forest, Grassland, Nama Karoo, and Savanna biomes. It has also been sampled from various agricultural crops including cabbage, citrus, maize, and tomato fields, demonstrating significant adaptability to agricultural environments.

== Description ==
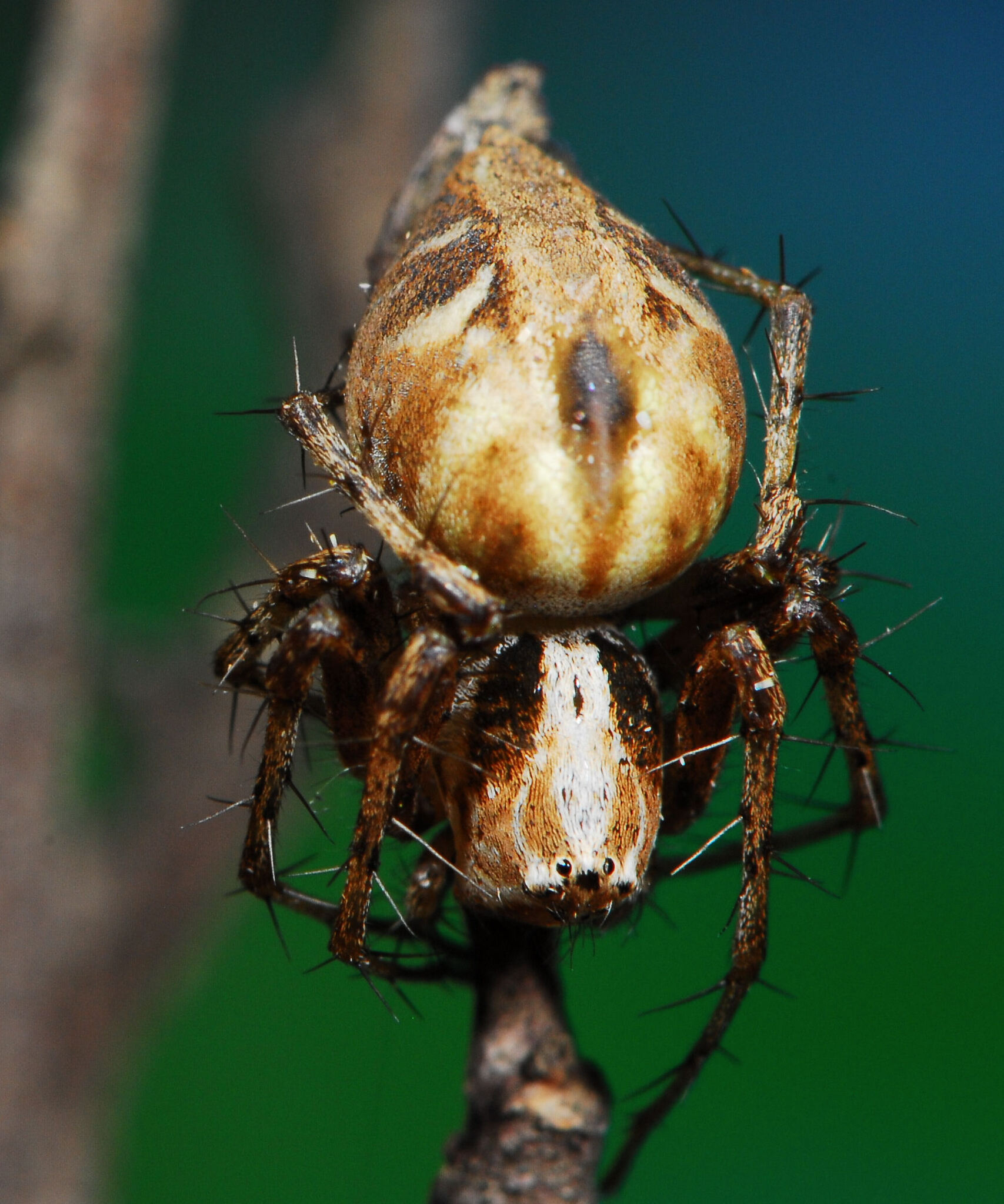
female

== Conservation ==
Oxyopes pallidecoloratus is listed as Least Concern by the South African National Biodiversity Institute due to its wide geographic range across multiple African countries and Madagascar. The species is protected in more than ten protected areas and faces no significant threats.
