= Plastonomus =

Scientific classification
- Kingdom: Animalia
- Phylum: Arthropoda
- Subphylum: Chelicerata
- Class: Arachnida
- Order: Araneae
- Infraorder: Araneomorphae
- Family: Thomisidae
- Genus: Plastonomus
- Species: P. octoguttatus

Binomial name
- Plastonomus octoguttatus Simon, 1903

Genus of spiders

Plastonomus is a genus of spiders in the family Thomisidae. It was first described in 1903 by Simon. As of 2017, it contains only one species, Plastonomus octoguttatus, found in Madagascar.
