= C. vicina =

C. vicina may refer to:

- Caerostris vicina, a spider species in the genus Caerostris
- Calliphora vicina, a bottle fly species
- Cheilosia vicina, a hoverfly species found in Great Britain

== See also ==
- Vicina (disambiguation)
