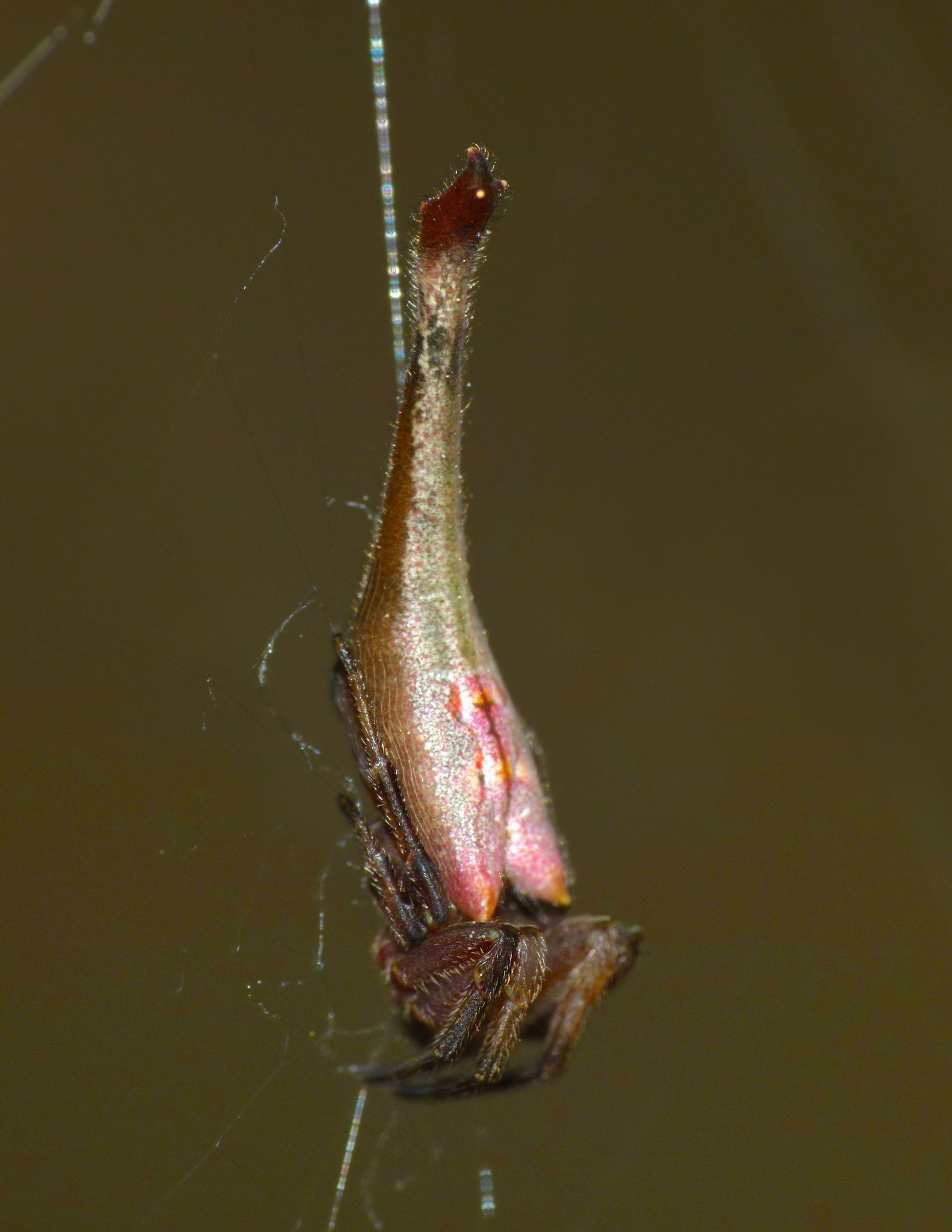

Scientific classification
- Kingdom: Animalia
- Phylum: Arthropoda
- Subphylum: Chelicerata
- Class: Arachnida
- Order: Araneae
- Infraorder: Araneomorphae
- Family: Araneidae
- Genus: Arachnura
- Species: A. feredayi

Binomial name
- Arachnura feredayi (L. Koch, 1871)

Synonyms
- Arachnura longicauda Urquhart, 1885; Arachnura longicauda nigritia Urquhart, 1885; Arachnura obtusa Urquhart, 1885

= Arachnura feredayi =

Species of spider

Arachnura feredayi, the tailed forest spider or scorpion-tailed spider, is endemic to New Zealand. It is known for the distinctive tapering body shape in females, which are also much larger than males, and for producing vertical columns of egg sacs in their webs.

== Description ==
Arachnura feredayi females reach up to 18 mm in length, with about a third of that length consisting of a distinct tail-end to their abdomen which is shaped like an autumn leaf or dead wood. The female is six times bigger than the male. Males are about 2 mm long, lack the female's 'tail' and are coloured in shades of brown. Female Arachnura feredayi colouring is variable, with yellow or yellow-green variants common.

This species is most similar to Arachnura higginsi from Australia, but the two species can be separated by structural differences in the male palp and female epigynum. Arachnura higginsi has also been reported as making aggregations of distinct but connected webs, but this has not been observed in A. feredayi.

== Geographic range ==
Arachnura feredayi is endemic to New Zealand and is found in Manawatāwhi / Three Kings Islands, the North Island and the South Island. These spiders are found in forests and gardens.

== Habitat ==
Arachnura feredayi can be found in the native forests of New Zealand and sometimes in gardens. In comparison to other orb web spiders, they tend to build their webs closer to ground between some dead leaf branches, bushes and shrubs. Spiders make an orb web, usually close to the ground. This web always has a V-shaped sector in the 12 o'clock position that is empty of spiral threads.

== Life cycle ==
Male A. feredayi will hide on the outskirt of the orb web in the irregular threads during the reproductive season. Males vibrate a radial thread to approach to the female and mating occurs in a mating thread built next to the middle of the web. After the reproduction, the male may be consumed by the female.

Females deposit egg sacs in a vertical column in the 12 o'clock position, resembling a chain of sausage links. Chains of eggs can have up to fifty eggs. The newest egg sac is located nearest to the web's central hub and the female rebuilds her web every time she produces a new egg sac in order to maintain this positioning. Egg sacs are brown to provide camouflage. Females stay directly below the egg sacs.

== Other information ==
Arachnura feredeyi was originally described by L. Koch in 1872 under the genus Epeira. It is the sole member of the genus recorded from New Zealand. Urquhart described several species of Arachnura but these were synonmised (see Synonyms) by Bryant in 1933. The Australian and New Zealand species of Arachnura were revised by Castanheira et al. in 2019.

This species has been listed as Not Threatened under the New Zealand Threat Classification System (NZTCS).
