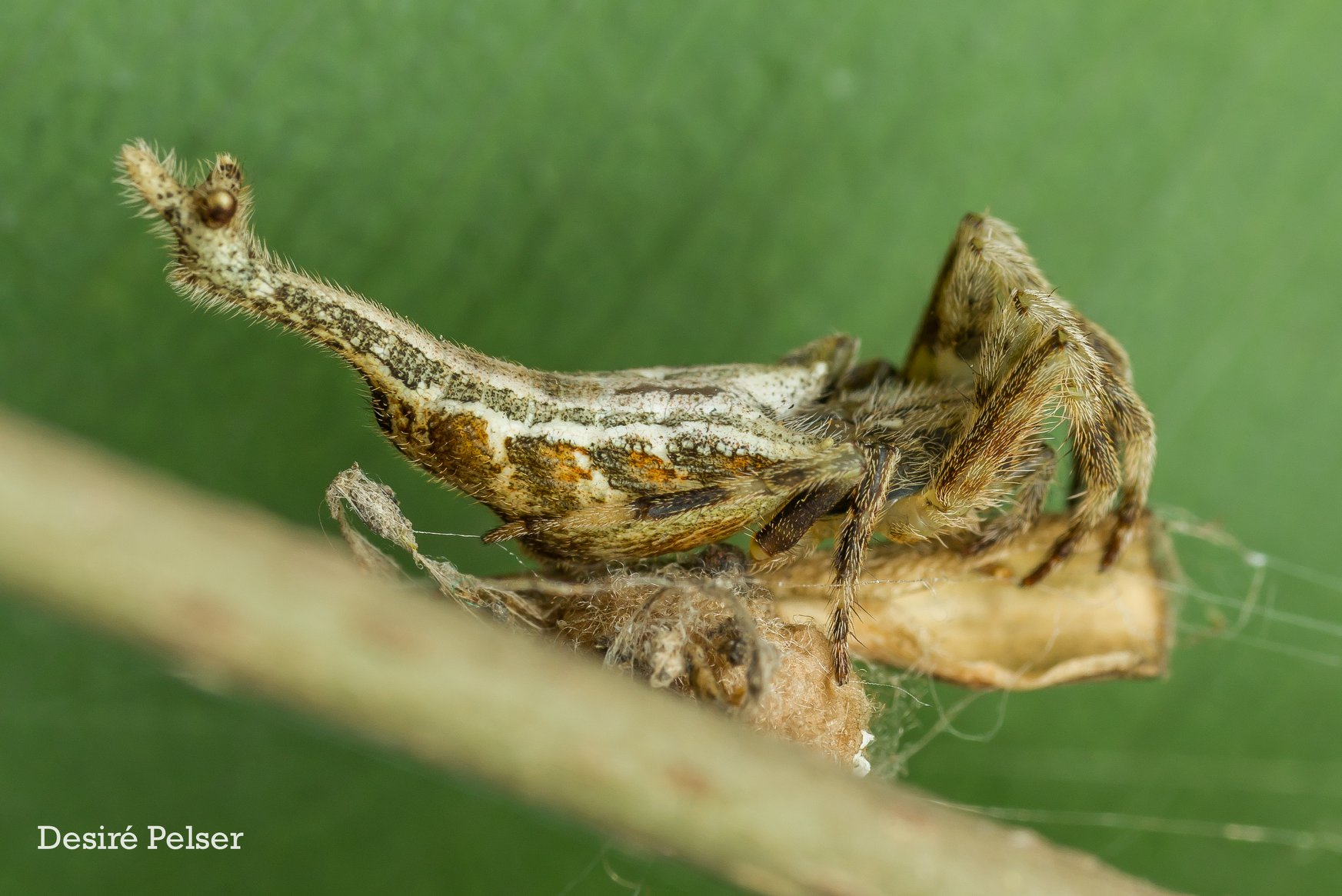

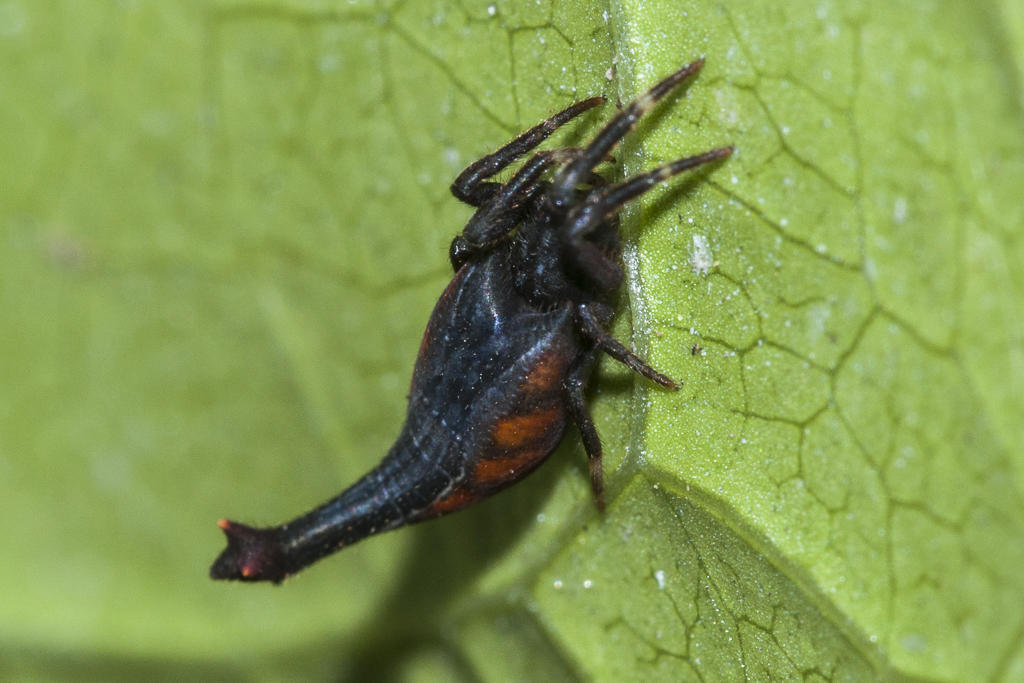

Scientific classification
- Kingdom: Animalia
- Phylum: Arthropoda
- Subphylum: Chelicerata
- Class: Arachnida
- Order: Araneae
- Infraorder: Araneomorphae
- Family: Araneidae
- Genus: Arachnura
- Species: A. scorpionoides

Binomial name
- Arachnura scorpionoides Vinson, 1863

Synonyms
- Hapalochrota caudata Keyserling, 1864

= Arachnura scorpionoides =

African Scorpion-Tail Spider

Species of spider

Arachnura scorpionoides is a species of drag tail spider in the family Araneidae, found across several African countries and islands in the western Indian Ocean. It is commonly known as the African scorpion-tail spider.

== Distribution ==
Arachnura scorpionoides has been recorded from Ethiopia, Democratic Republic of the Congo, Seychelles, Mayotte, Madagascar, Mauritius, and Réunion.

In South Africa, it occurs in Eastern Cape, KwaZulu-Natal, Limpopo, Mpumalanga, North West, and Western Cape.

== Habitat and ecology ==
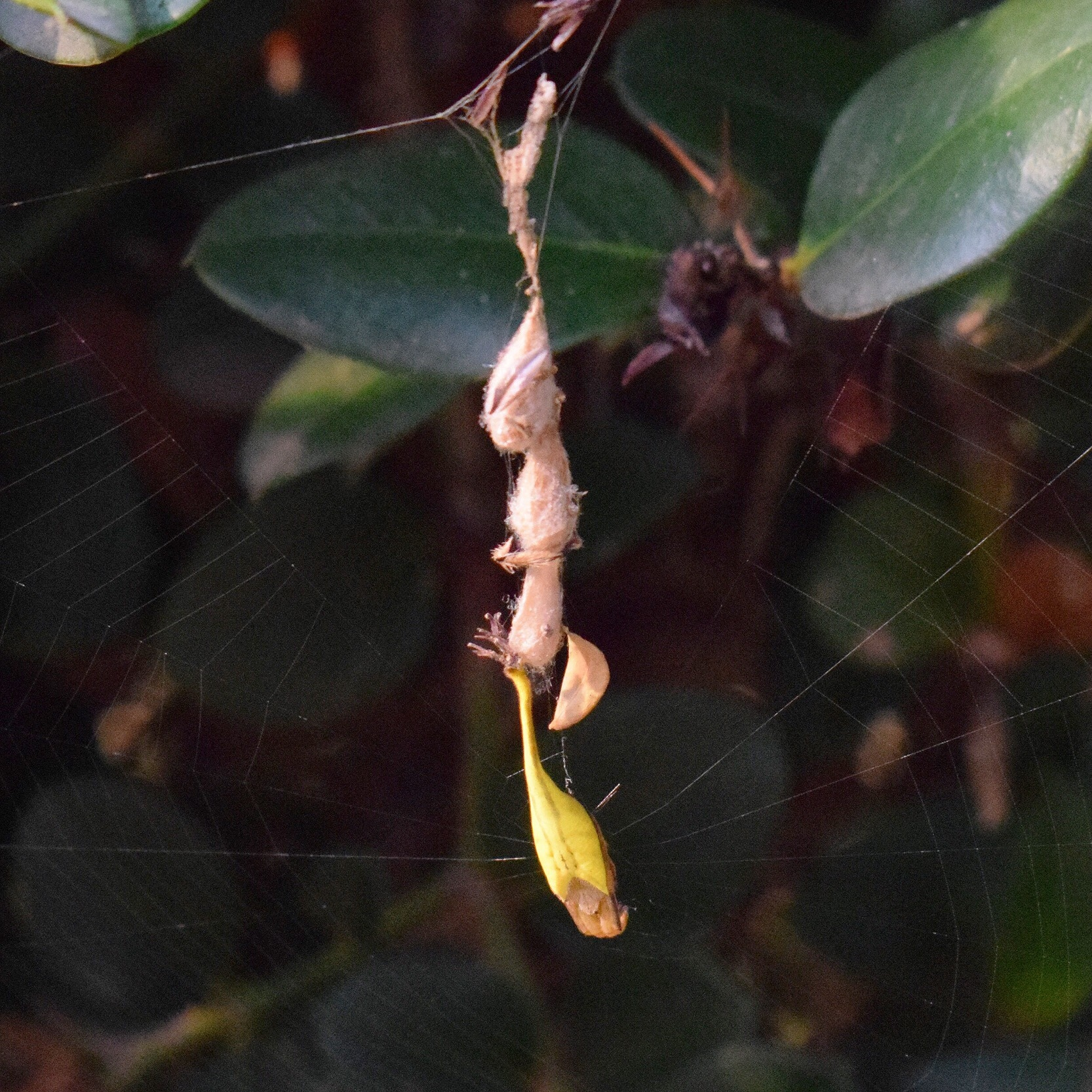
female with egg sacs in web

The species inhabits Fynbos, Indian Ocean Coastal Belt, Savanna, and Thicket biomes, as well as macadamia orchards. It occurs at altitudes ranging from 7 to 1,411 m above sea level.

Arachnura scorpionoides constructs a permanent orb-web with an open hub. The web is suspended at an angle and has a V-shaped section missing from the top. In autumn and winter, females produce a series of woolly brownish egg sacs, which they string together in a line from the centre of the web to fill the missing section. The spider positions itself at the bottom of the egg string.

When disturbed, the female curls her tail up over her back like a scorpion. The front legs are stronger than the rest and are kept close to the body when the spider is alive.

== Description ==
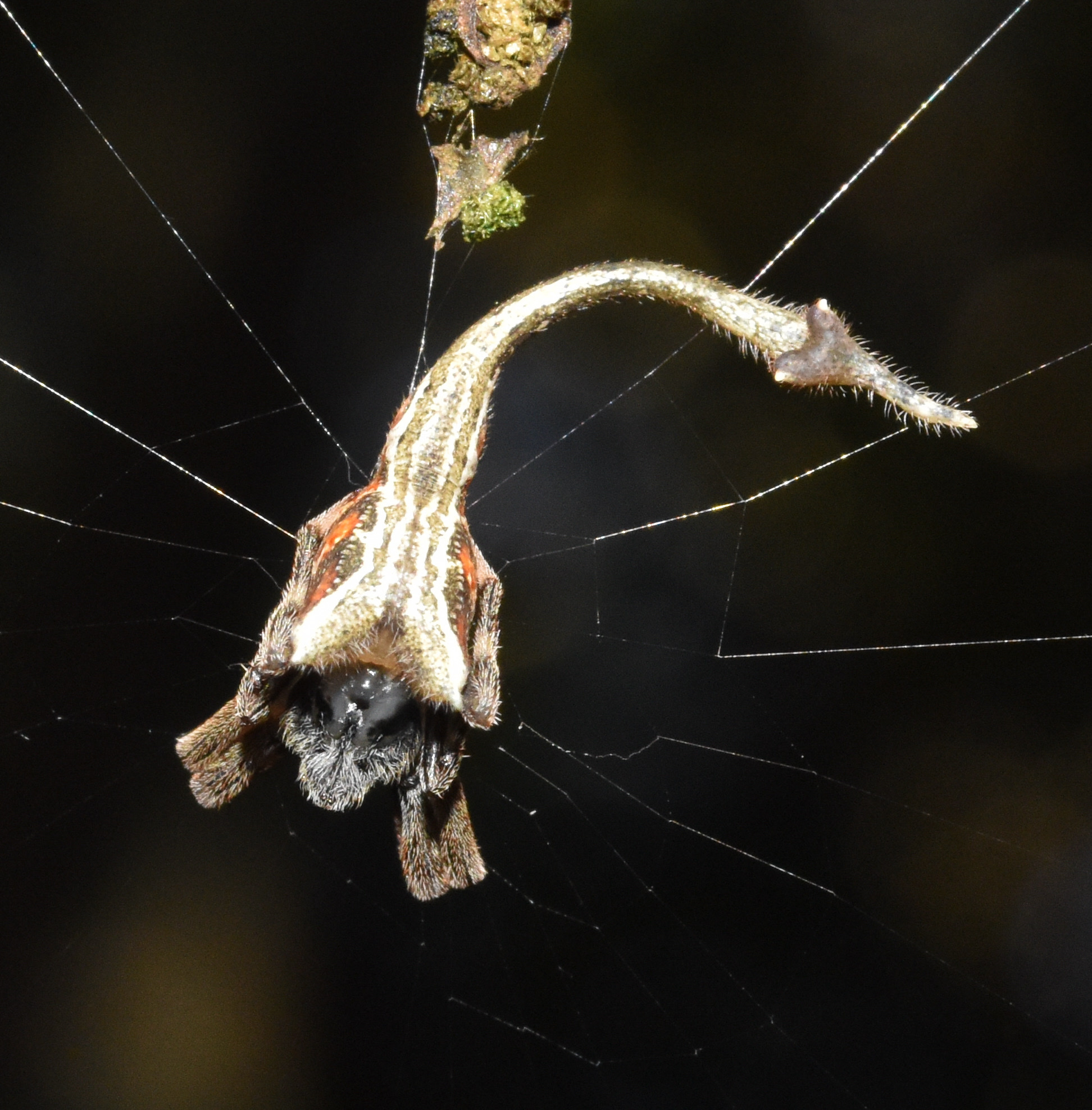

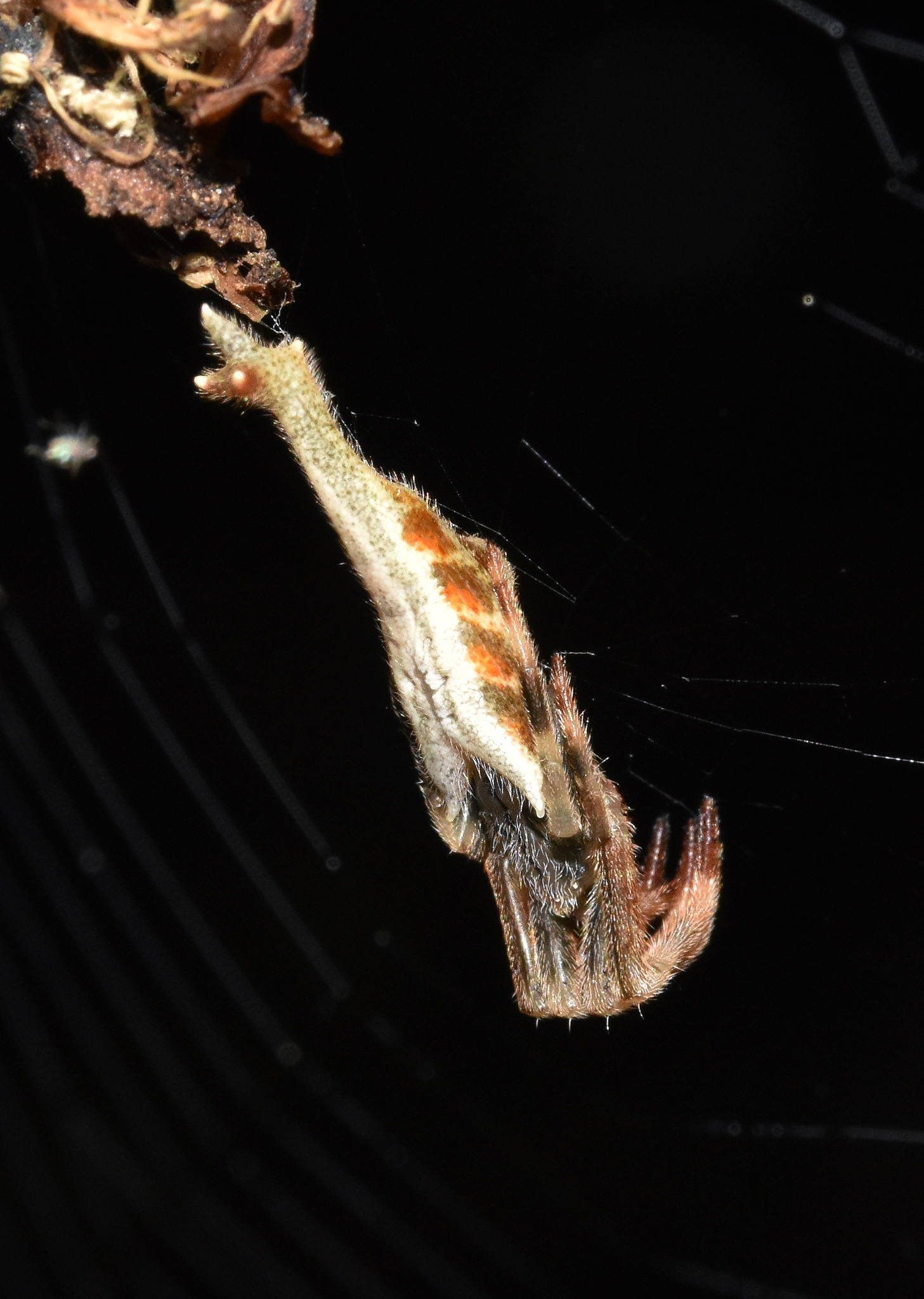

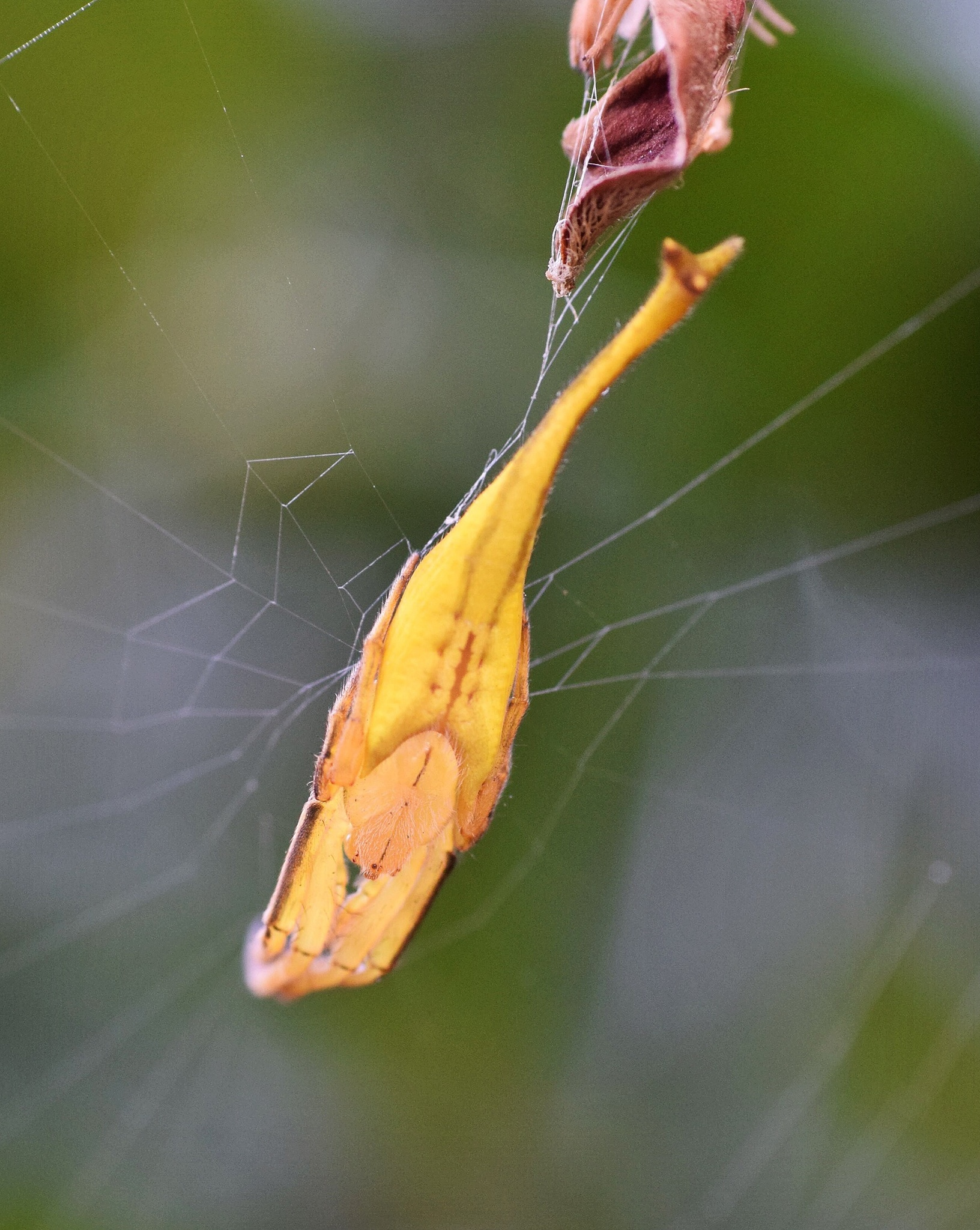

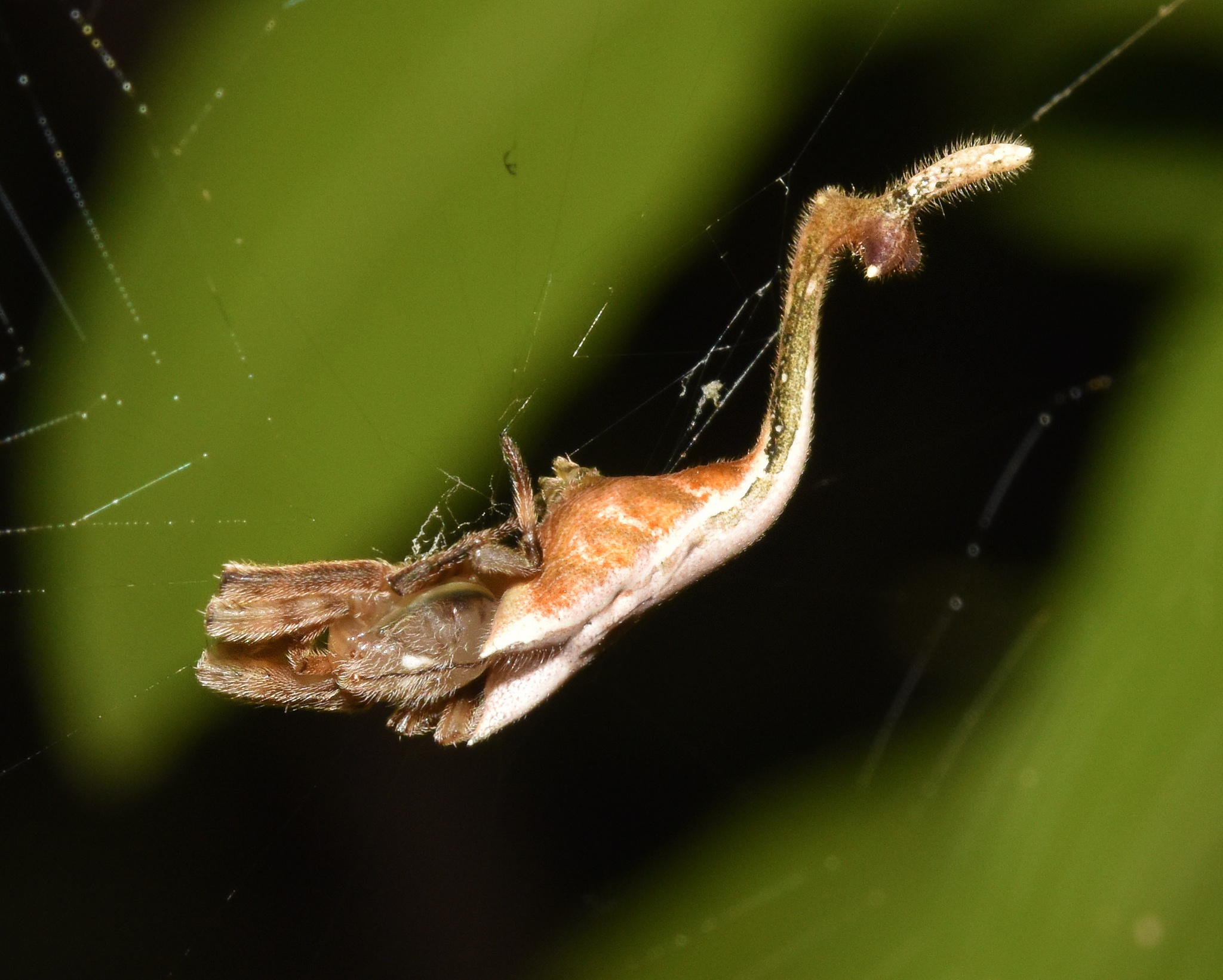

== Conservation ==
Arachnura scorpionoides is listed as Least Concern by the South African National Biodiversity Institute due to its wide geographical range. In South Africa, it is protected in more than ten protected areas, including Ndumo Game Reserve, Table Mountain National Park, and Garden Route National Park.

== Etymology ==
The species name scorpionoides refers to the scorpion-like appearance of the spider.

== Taxonomy ==
The species was originally described by Auguste Vinson in 1863 from Madagascar. It has not been revised but is known from both sexes with well-illustrated drawings. Identification is not considered problematic.
