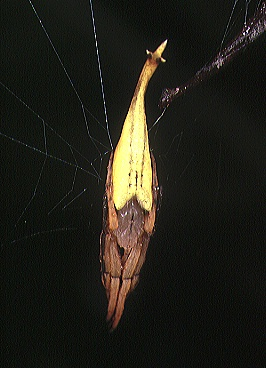
- female A. melanura
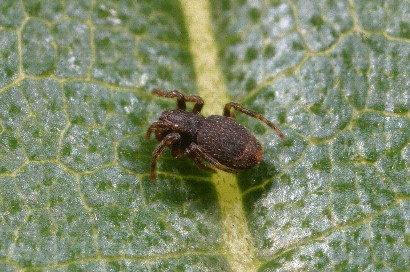
- male A. logio

Scientific classification
- Kingdom: Animalia
- Phylum: Arthropoda
- Subphylum: Chelicerata
- Class: Arachnida
- Order: Araneae
- Infraorder: Araneomorphae
- Family: Araneidae
- Genus: Arachnura; Vinson, 1863

Type species
- A. scorpionoides Vinson, 1863

Species
- 12, see text

= Arachnura =

Scorpion-Tail Spiders

Genus of spiders

Arachnura, also known as drag-tailed spider, scorpion-tailed spider and scorpion spider, is a genus of orb-weaver spiders that was first described by Auguste Vinson in 1863. They are distributed across Australasia, Southern and Eastern Asia with one species from Africa.

Females curl up their tails when disturbed, mimicking scorpions, but they are unable to sting. Bites are rare, and result in minor symptoms such as local pain and swelling. They stay at the middle of their web day and night, with their bodies mimicking plant litter, such as fallen flowers, twigs, or dead leaves.

== Names ==
The genus name is a combination of the Ancient Greek "arachne-" (ἀράχνη) and "uro" (οὐρά), meaning "tail".

Arachnura logio is called Kijiro o-hiki-gumo in Japanese. A. feredayi is commonly called Tailed forest spider. A. higginsi is often found in large numbers near water in Australia.

== Life style ==
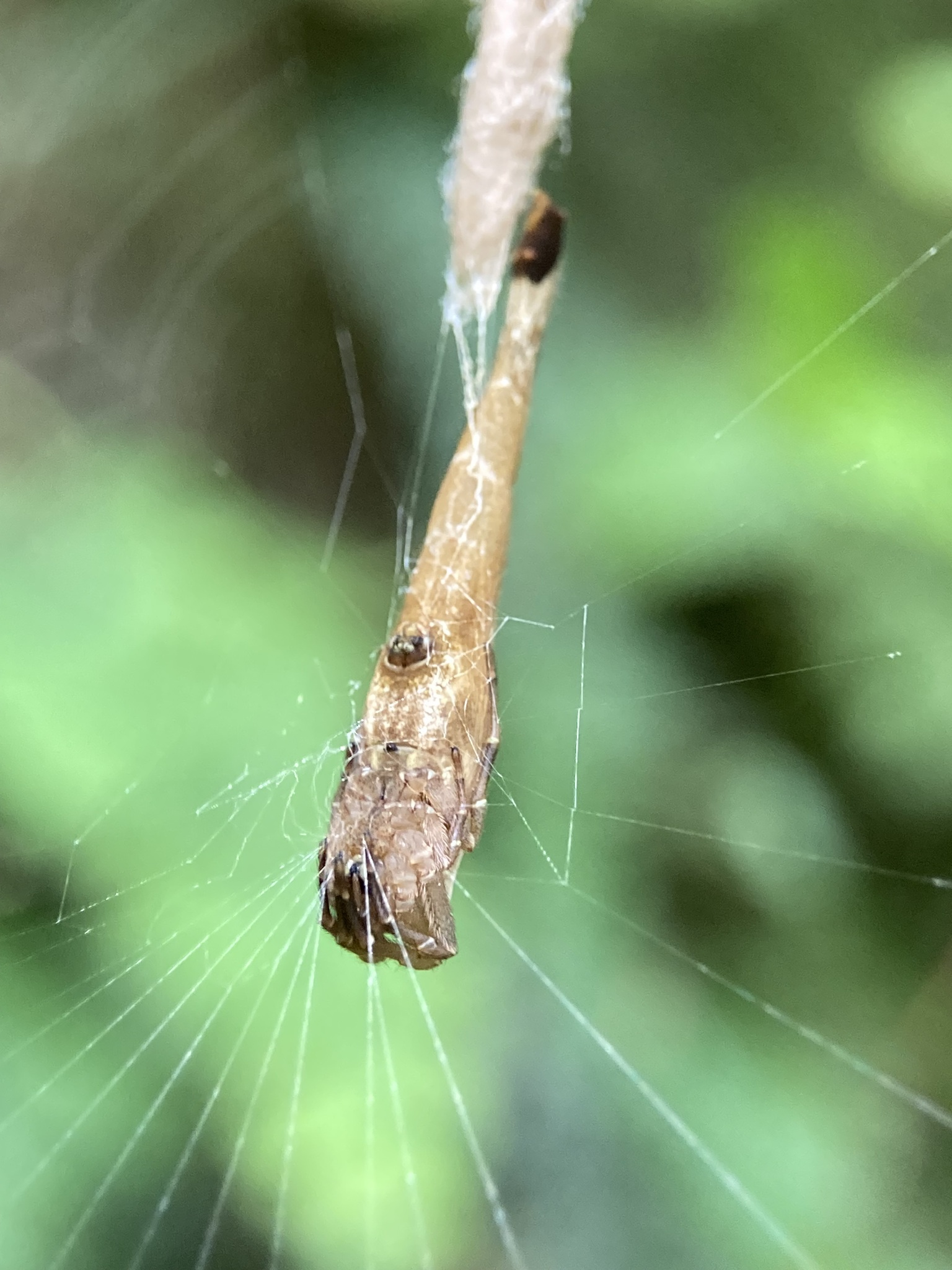
A. feredayi in web

Members of genus Arachnura construct a permanent but incomplete orb-web with an open hub. The web is suspended at an angle and has a V-shaped section missing from the top of the web. In autumn/winter, the female produces a series of woolly brownish egg sacs, which she strings together in a line from the centre of the web to fill the missing section. The spider takes up position at the bottom of the string in the centre of the web. Females curl up their tail over their back like a scorpion when threatened. In the web the legs are folded together to form a line.

== Description ==
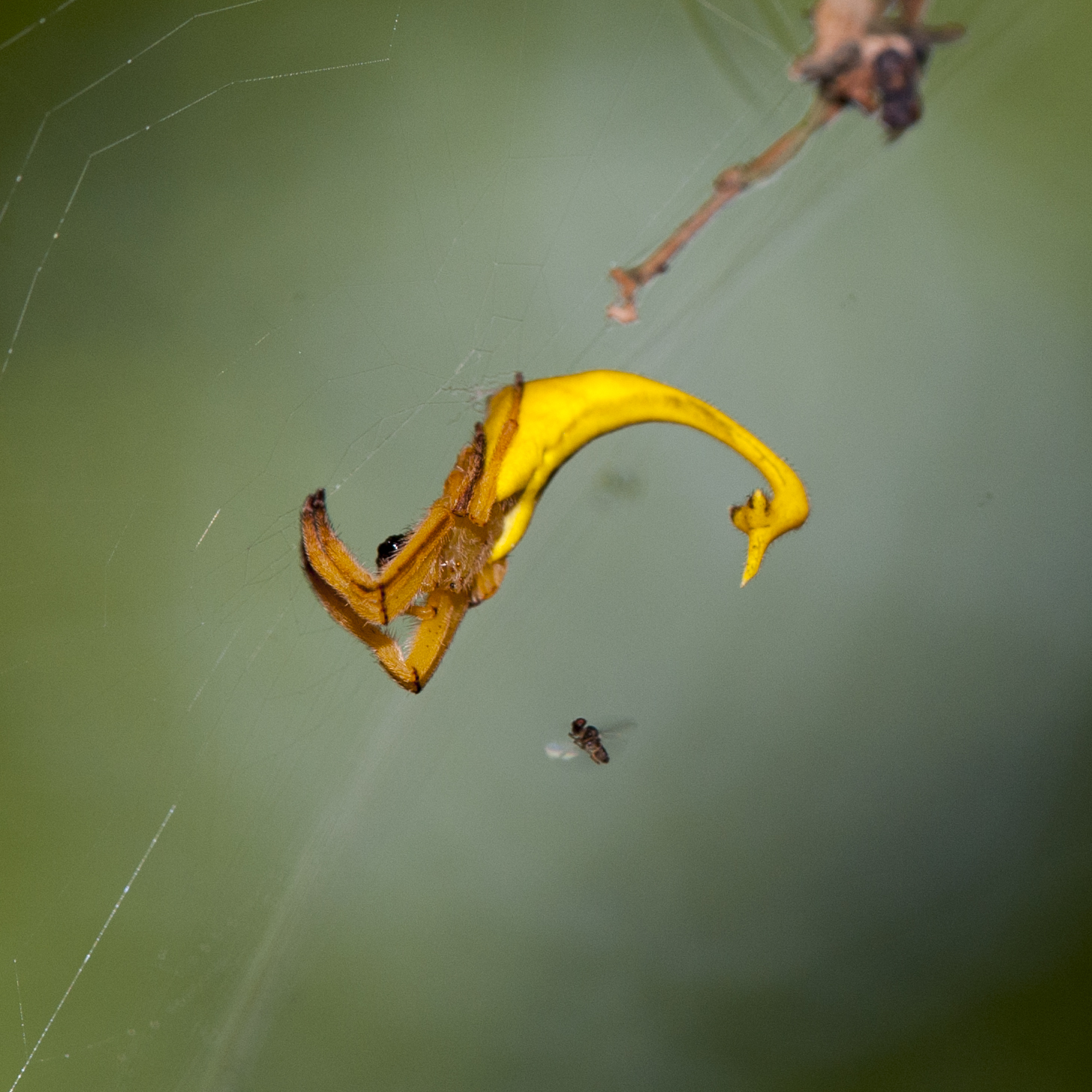
A. melanura

The total length of both females and males ranges from 7 to 10 mm.

Members of this genus feature a very long tapering "tail" that is capable of movement. This tail extends beyond the spinnerets for a distance that exceeds one-third of the abdomen's length.

Color variation occurs within the genus, ranging from brown and cream to bright yellow. The carapace is broad and narrows anteriorly, while the eyes are arranged in two rows with the posterior median eyes positioned closely together.

The abdomen is broad and features two horn-like projections that protrude over the cephalothorax in a V-shaped formation, then tapers into a long tail with soft humps at the tips. Leg II displays dark longitudinal stripes along its entire length, and these legs form edges around the body when the spider is in a resting position.

== Species ==
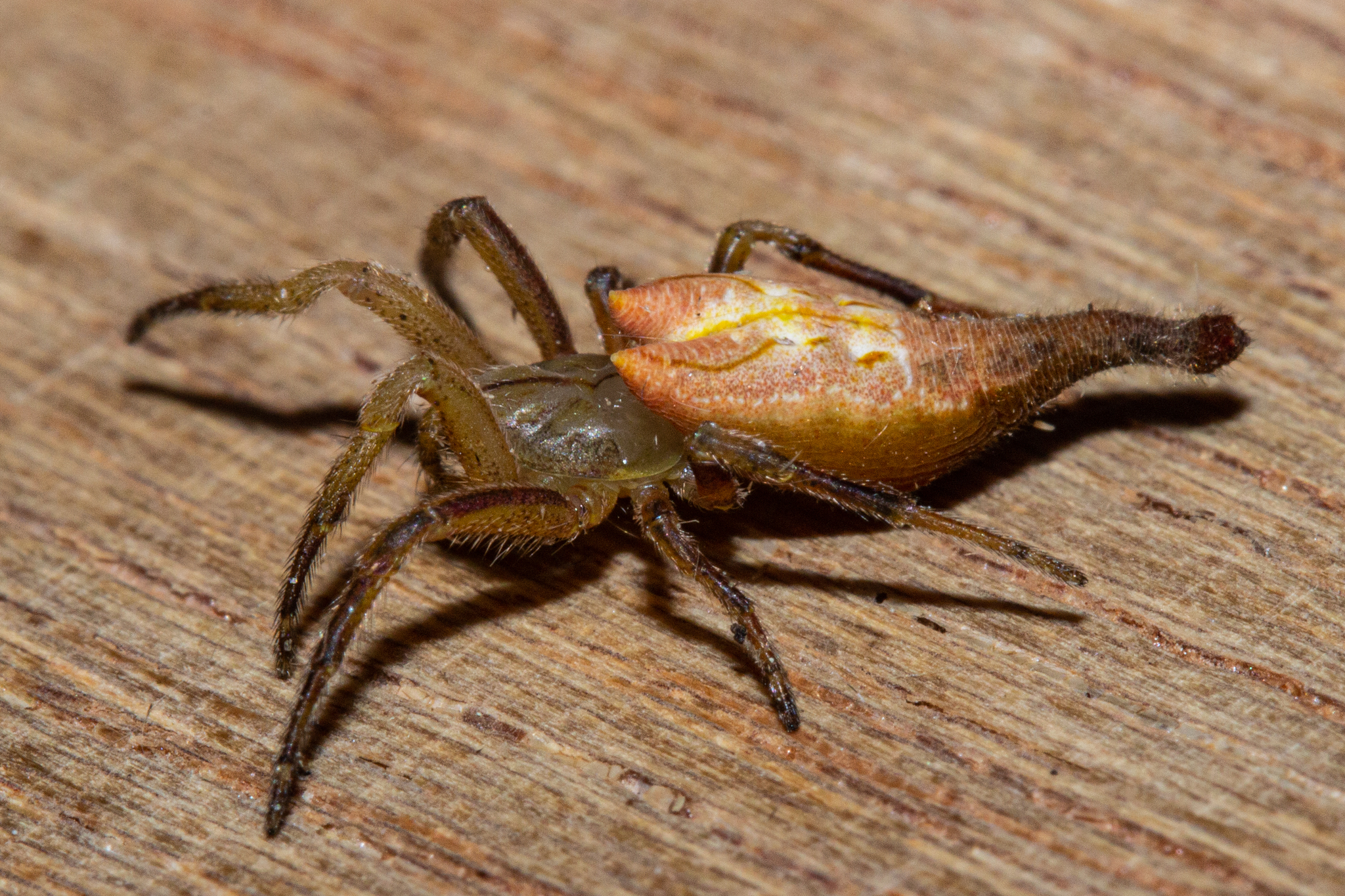
A. feredayi

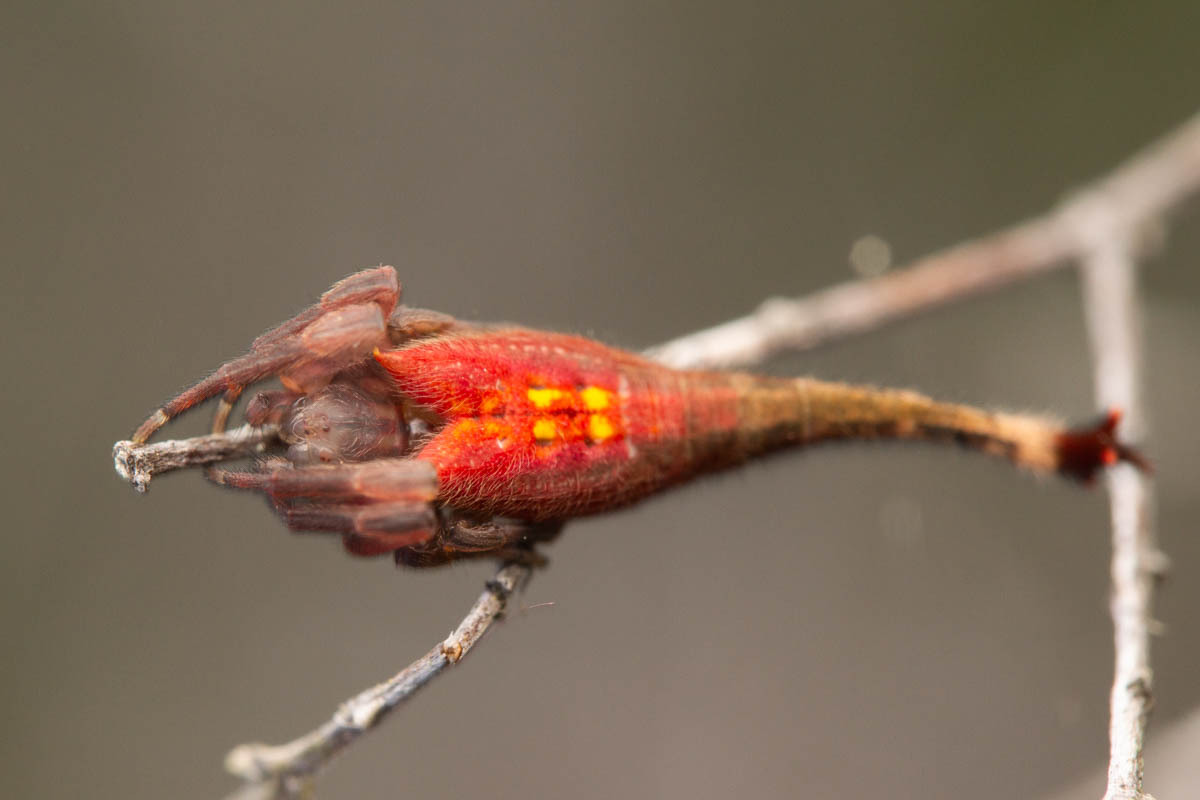
A. higginsi

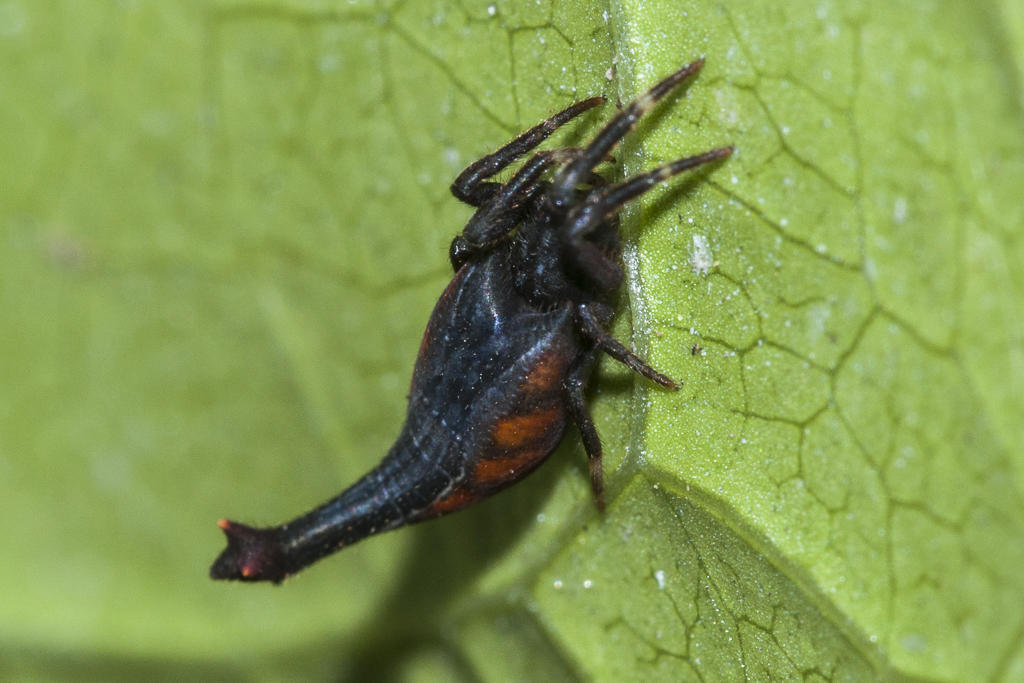
A.scorpionoides

As of November 2026, this genus includes twelve species:

- Arachnura angura Tikader, 1970 – India
- Arachnura feredayi (L. Koch, 1872) – New Zealand
- Arachnura heptotubercula Yin, Hu & Wang, 1983 – China
- Arachnura higginsi (L. Koch, 1872) – Australia
- Arachnura logio Yaginuma, 1956 – China, Korea, Japan
- Arachnura melanura Simon, 1867 – India, Indonesia, (Sulawesi), Papua New Guinea, Australia (Queensland)
- Arachnura perfissa (Thorell, 1895) – Myanmar
- Arachnura pygmaea (Thorell, 1890) – Indonesia (Nias Is.)
- Arachnura quinqueapicata Strand, 1911 – Indonesia (Aru Is.)
- Arachnura scorpionoides Vinson, 1863 – Ethiopia, DR Congo, South Africa, Seychelles, Mayotte, Madagascar, Mauritius, Réunion (type species)
- Arachnura simoni Berland, 1924 – New Caledonia
- Arachnura spinosa (Saito, 1933) – Taiwan
