= A. vicina =

A. vicina may refer to:

- Agave vicina, a plant species in the genus Agave
- Amphiodia vicina, a brittle star species in the genus Amphiodia

== See also ==
- Vicina (disambiguation)
