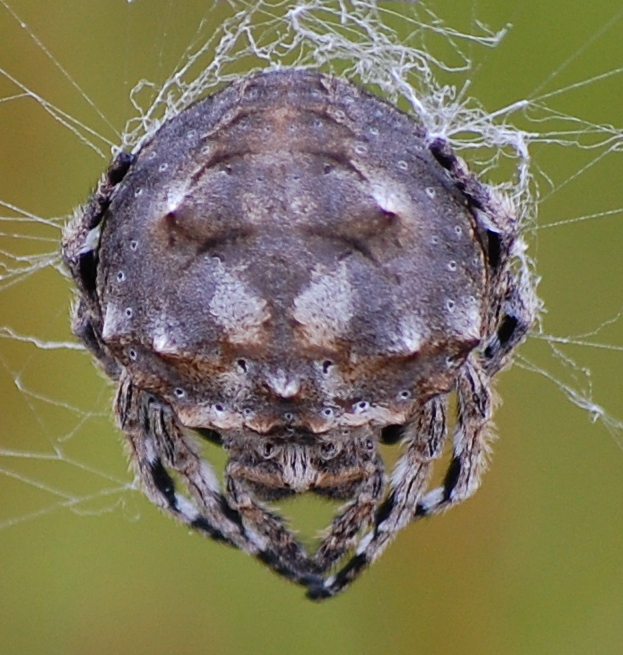

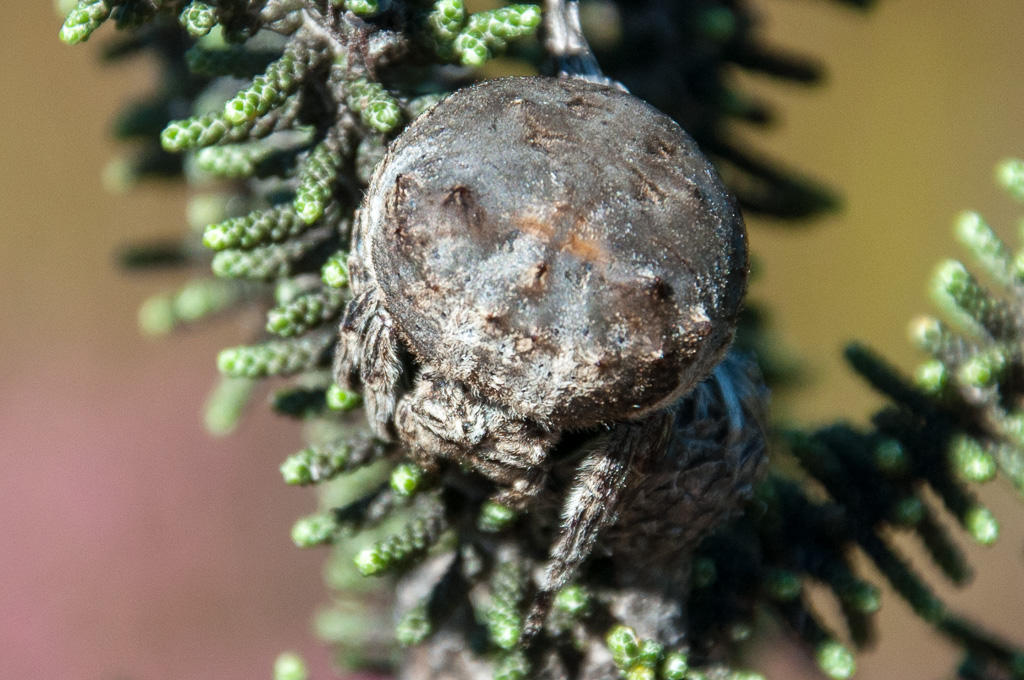

Scientific classification
- Kingdom: Animalia
- Phylum: Arthropoda
- Subphylum: Chelicerata
- Class: Arachnida
- Order: Araneae
- Infraorder: Araneomorphae
- Family: Araneidae
- Genus: Caerostris
- Species: C. corticosa

Binomial name
- Caerostris corticosa Pocock, 1902

Synonyms
- Caerostris bimaculata Strand, 1907

= Caerostris corticosa =

Bare-legged Bark Spider

Species of spider

Caerostris corticosa is a species of spider in the family Araneidae. It is endemic to southern Africa and is commonly known as the bare-legged bark spider.

== Distribution ==
Caerostris corticosa has been collected from Namibia, Botswana, Zimbabwe, South Africa, and Eswatini. In South Africa, the species is known from eight of the nine provinces at elevations ranging from 7 to 1,303 m above sea level.

== Habitat and ecology ==
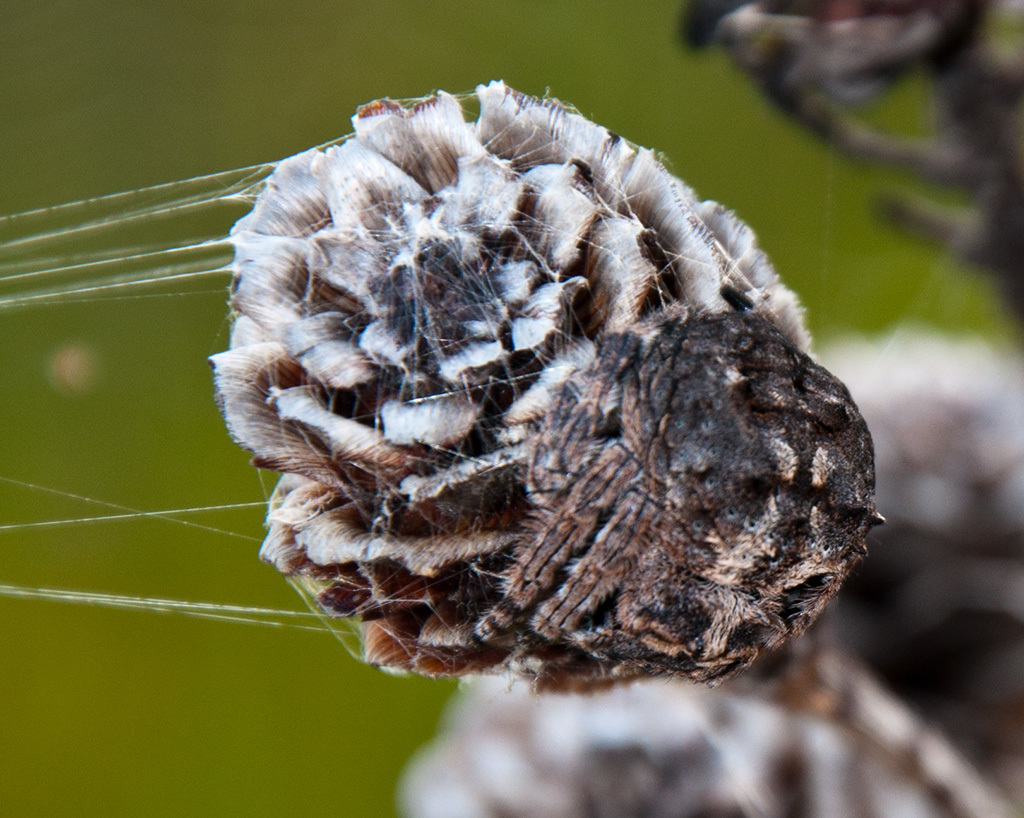

The species constructs webs between shrubs and trees, usually at sunset. The spider hangs head-down in the middle of the orb web. During the day, the spiders rest on thick branches close to the attachment lines of their webs, and their brown or grey colouration provides effective camouflage on bark and lichens.

== Description ==
The female is recognized by the ventral surface of the abdomen being black or with two white spots, the sternum covered with dense white setae, and the posterior side of the femur IV bearing slender undifferentiated hairs. The species closely resembles Caerostris sexcuspidata in colour and general characters.

== Conservation ==
Caerostris corticosa is listed as Least Concern by the South African National Biodiversity Institute due to its wide distribution. It is protected in areas including Mkuzi Game Reserve, Roodeplaatdam Nature Reserve, and Table Mountain National Park.

== Taxonomy ==
The species was originally described by Pocock in 1902 from Botswana. It was revised by Grasshoff in 1984, who synonymized Caerostris bimaculata with this species. The male remains unknown.
