= Darwin's bark spider =

Scientific classification
- Kingdom: Animalia
- Phylum: Arthropoda
- Subphylum: Chelicerata
- Class: Arachnida
- Order: Araneae
- Infraorder: Araneomorphae
- Family: Araneidae
- Genus: Caerostris
- Species: C. darwini

Binomial name
- Caerostris darwini Kuntner & Agnarsson, 2010

Species of spider

Darwin's bark spider (Caerostris darwini) is an orb-weaver spider that produces the largest known orb webs, ranging from 0.09 to 2.8 square metres (0.97 to 30.14 sq ft), with bridge lines spanning up to 25 metres (82 ft). The spider was discovered in Madagascar in the Andasibe-Mantadia National Park in 2009. Its silk is the toughest biological material ever studied. Its tensile strength is 1.6 GPa. The species was named in honour of the naturalist Charles Darwin on November 24, 2009—precisely 150 years after the publication of The Origin of Species.

== Description ==
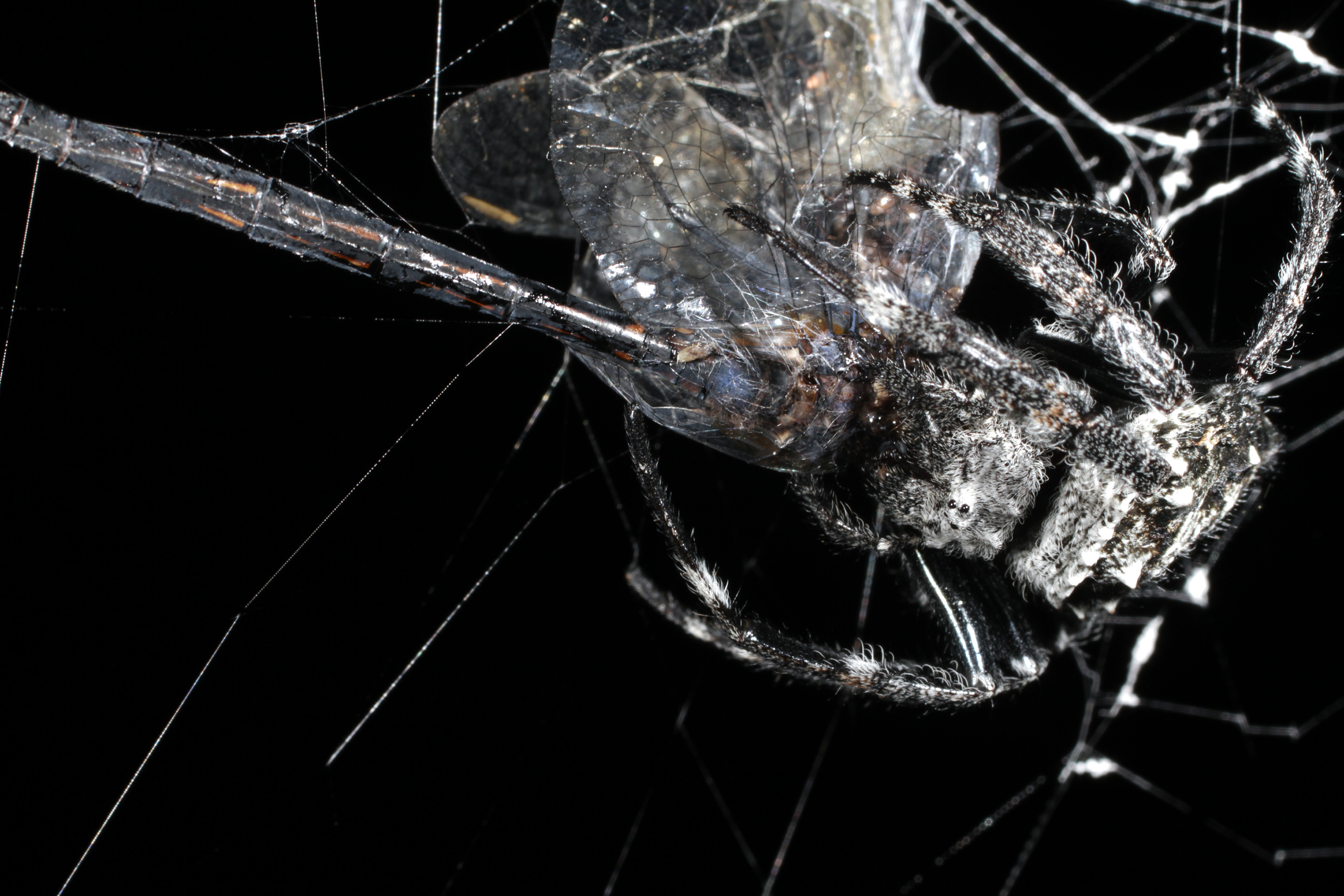
Dragonflies are the largest recorded prey of Darwin's bark spider

Darwin's bark spider (Caerostris darwini) is an orb-weaver spider – a member of the family Araneidae. Like other spiders of the genus, they display extreme sexual dimorphism, with large females and small males. Females vary in total body length from about 18 to 22 mm (0.7 to 0.9 in), males being around one third or less of this length, at about 6 mm (0.2 in). In a captive bred population, females were 14 (1.3–195) times heavier and 2.3 (1–4) times larger than males.

Females are largely black in colour, with white hairs on the cephalothorax (prosoma), abdomen and appendages. The upper surface of the cephalothorax has two sets of "humps", one at the sides and one towards the back. The first leg is about 35 mm (1.4 in) long. Unlike other Caerostris species from the region, C. darwini has clearly separated epigynal chambers with a pair of hooks on the posterior (rather than anterior or medial) part of the epigynal plate. The spermathecae and the ducts leading to them are strongly sclerotized (hardened). Males are redder and lighter brown in colour, again with white hairs on the cephalothorax, abdomen and parts of the appendages further from the body. The femora of the legs are red and hairless. The first leg is about 15 mm (0.6 in) long. The palpal bulb has a large conductor with a straight tip, and a longer embolus with a spoon-shaped end than other species from the region.

== Taxonomy ==
Caerostris darwini was first described by Matjaž Kuntner and Ingi Agnarsson in a 2010 publication. Prior to the description of C. darwini, only 11 species of Caerostris were recognized; Kuntner and Agnarsson regarded this as a serious underestimate, with perhaps up to seven species cohabiting in the region of Madagascar where C. darwini was found. Six more species, four of these from Madagascar, were described in 2015. A molecular phylogenetic study of 12 of the species of Caerostris, including C. darwini, produced the phylogenetic tree shown below.

- - C. sumatrana
  - - C. darwini
    - C. mitralis
    - - - C. sexcuspidata
        - - C. linnaeus
          - C. timaze
      - - C. wallacei
        - - C. almae
          - C. cowani
        - - C. pero
          - - C. bojani
            - C. extrusa

== Behavior ==
=== Webs ===
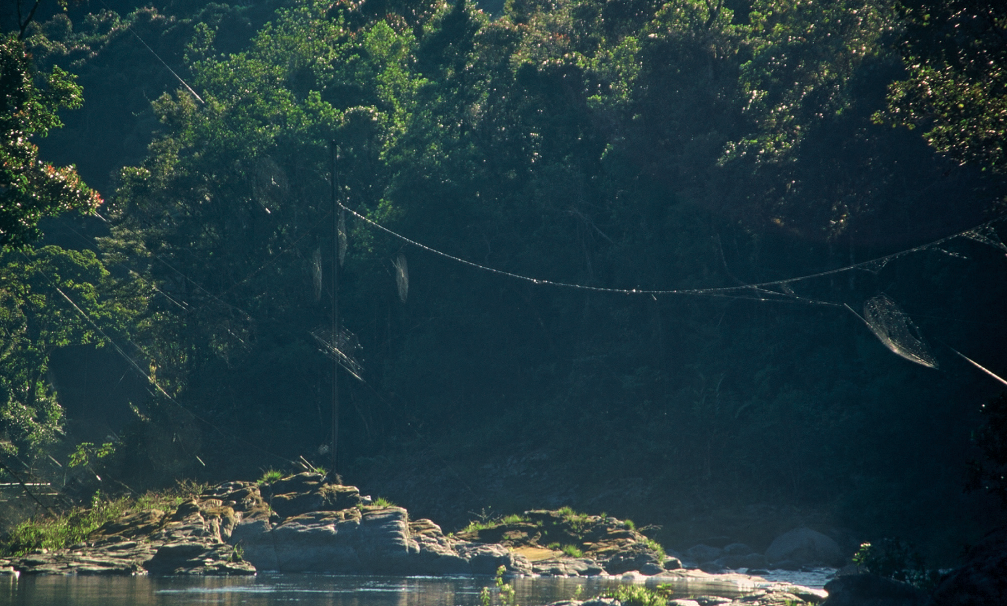
Several webs of C. darwini spanning a river, demonstrating their extreme length

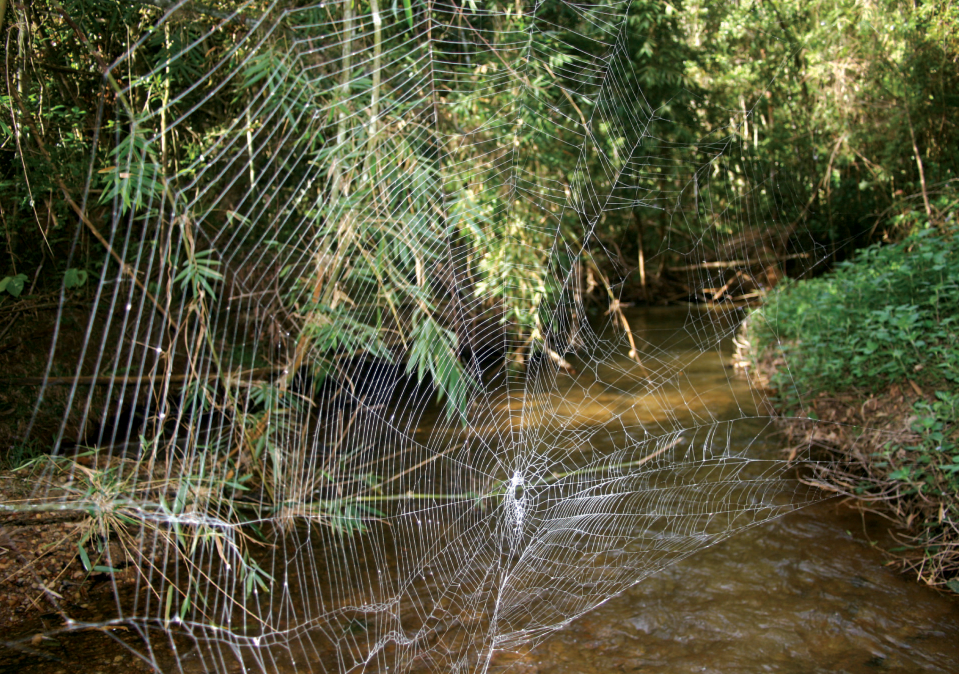
A web of Darwin's bark spider

The spider's silk is the toughest biological material ever studied, over ten times tougher than a similarly sized piece of Kevlar. The average toughness of the fibres is 350 MJ/m^{3}, and some are up to 520 MJ/m^{3}, making the silk twice as tough as any other spider silk known.

The web of Darwin's bark spider is remarkable in that it is not only the longest spanning web ever observed, but is the largest orb web ever seen, at an area of up to 2.8 square metres (30 sq ft). Nephila komaci, discovered in 2009, and some other Nephila species also make webs that can exceed 1 m (3 ft 3 in) across.

The spider's web occupies a unique biological niche: "They build their web with the orb suspended directly above a river or the water body of a lake, a habitat that no other spider can use". This position allows the spiders to catch prey flying over the water, with webs observed containing up to 32 mayflies at a time.

The strong silk and large web are thought to have coevolved at the same time, as the spider adapted to the habitat. Caerostris darwini uses a unique set of behaviors, some unknown in other spiders, to construct its enormous webs. First, the spiders release unusually large amounts of bridging silk into the air, which is then carried downwind, across the water body, establishing bridge lines. Second, the spiders perform almost no web site exploration. Third, they construct the orb capture area below the initial bridge line. In contrast to all known orb-weavers, the web hub is therefore not part of the initial bridge line but is instead built de novo ("from the beginning"). Fourth, the orb contains two types of radial threads, with those in the upper half of the web doubled. These unique behaviors result in a giant, yet rather simplified web. There is building evidence for the coevolution of behavioral (web building), ecological (web microhabitat) and biomaterial (silk biomechanics) traits that combined allow C. darwini to occupy a unique niche among spiders."

=== Sexual behavior ===
The Darwin's bark spider exhibits a rich repertoire of sexual behaviors, most attributed to other spider taxa with extreme sexual dimorphism in size. These behaviors include sexual cannibalism, male preference for teneral females, binding the mate with silk, genital mutilation, plugging of female genitalia by the male, and self-emasculation. Non-typically, C. darwini males engage in oral sexual encounters, rarely reported outside mammals. Irrespective of female's age or mating status males salivate onto female genitalia pre-, during, and post-copulation. While the adaptive significance of sexual oral contact in spiders is elusive, it is hypothesized to signal male quality or reduce sperm competition.

=== Interspecies interactions ===
The spider was described along with a previously undescribed species of fly, which appeared to have a kleptoparasitic relationship with it. The flies often feed on the spider's catches before the spider wraps them. Occasionally, spiders have been observed to chase away the flies when they land on something that the spider is eating.
