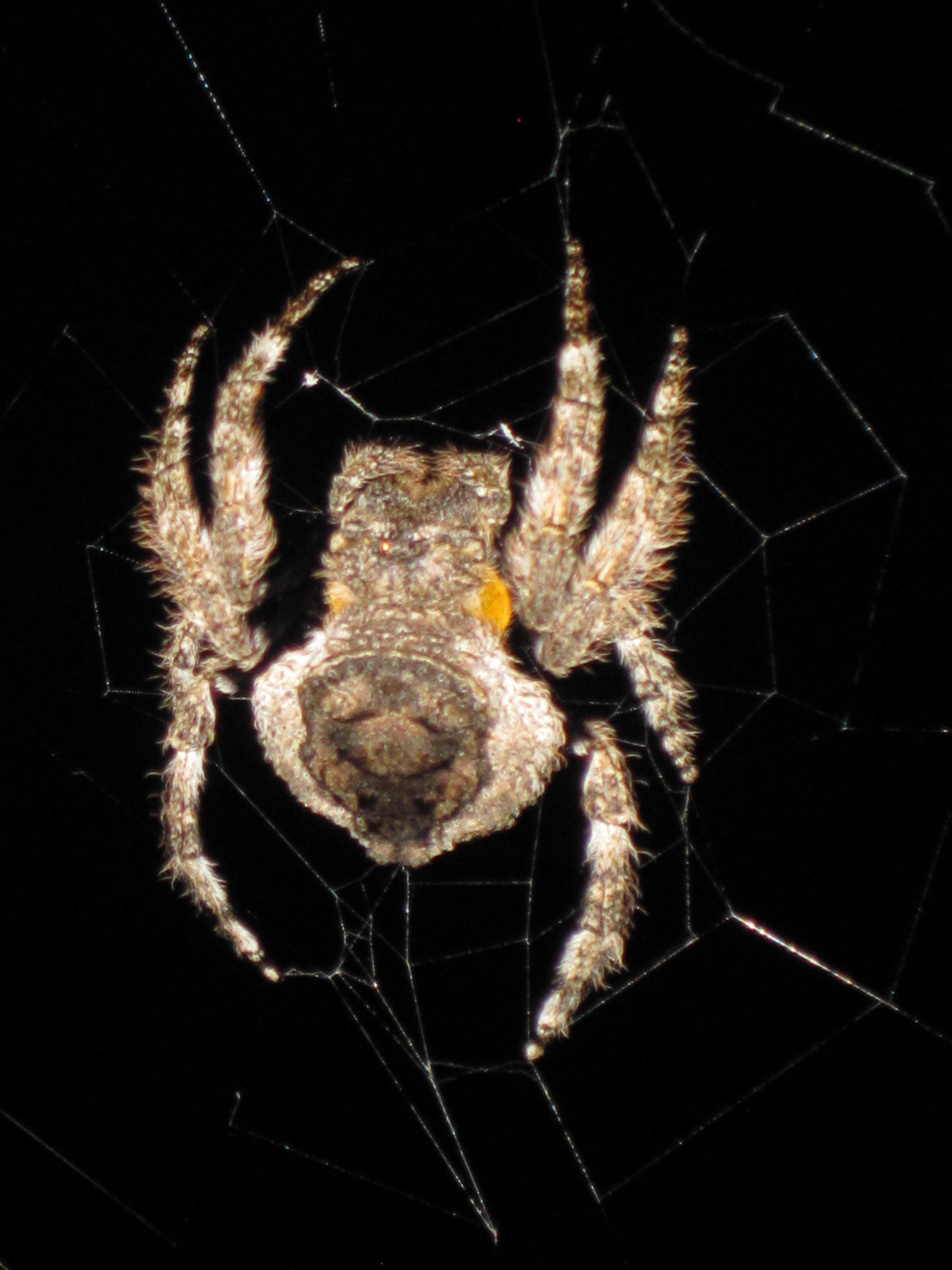
- C. sexcuspidata in web
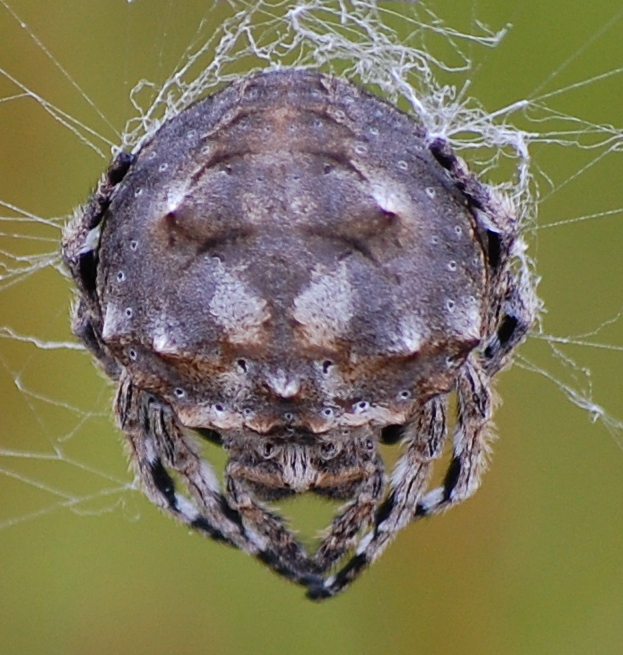
- C. corticosa

Scientific classification
- Kingdom: Animalia
- Phylum: Arthropoda
- Subphylum: Chelicerata
- Class: Arachnida
- Order: Araneae
- Infraorder: Araneomorphae
- Family: Araneidae
- Genus: Caerostris; Thorell, 1868

Species
- 20, see text

Synonyms
- Trichocharis Simon, 1895

= Caerostris =

Genus of spiders

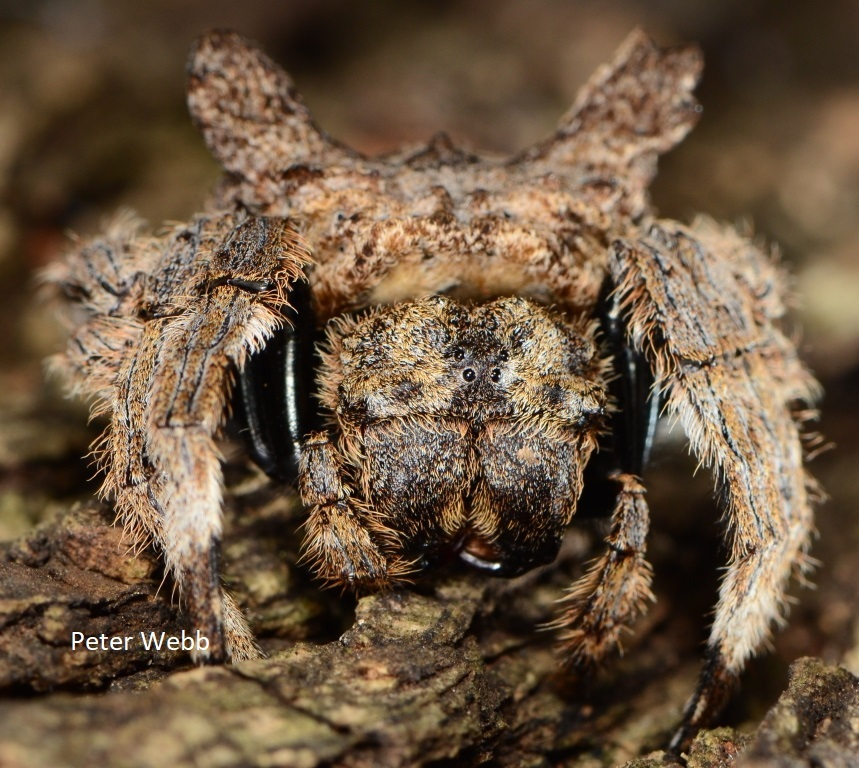
Front view of C. sexcuspidata

Caerostris, sometimes called bark spiders, is a genus of orb-weaver spiders first described by Tamerlan Thorell in 1868. Most species are found in south eastern Africa and neighboring Madagascar.

== Taxonomy ==
The genus Caerostris was erected in 1868 by Tamerlan Thorell with the type species being Epeira mitralis Vinson, 1863, which Thorell transferred to Caerostris mitralis. Up to 2009, only 11 species had been described. A further species, C. darwini, was described in 2010, and six more species in 2015. Two of the "species", C. sexcuspidata and C. sumatrana, will probably need to be divided further to produce genetically uniform species.

A molecular phylogenetic study of 12 of the species of Caerostris produced the phylogenetic tree shown below, showing that the African and Madagascan species form a monophyletic group.

- - C. sumatrana
  - - C. darwini
    - C. mitralis
    - - - C. sexcuspidata
        - - C. linnaeus
          - C. timaze
      - - C. wallacei
        - - C. almae
          - C. cowani
        - - C. pero
          - - C. bojani
            - C. extrusa

== Behavior ==
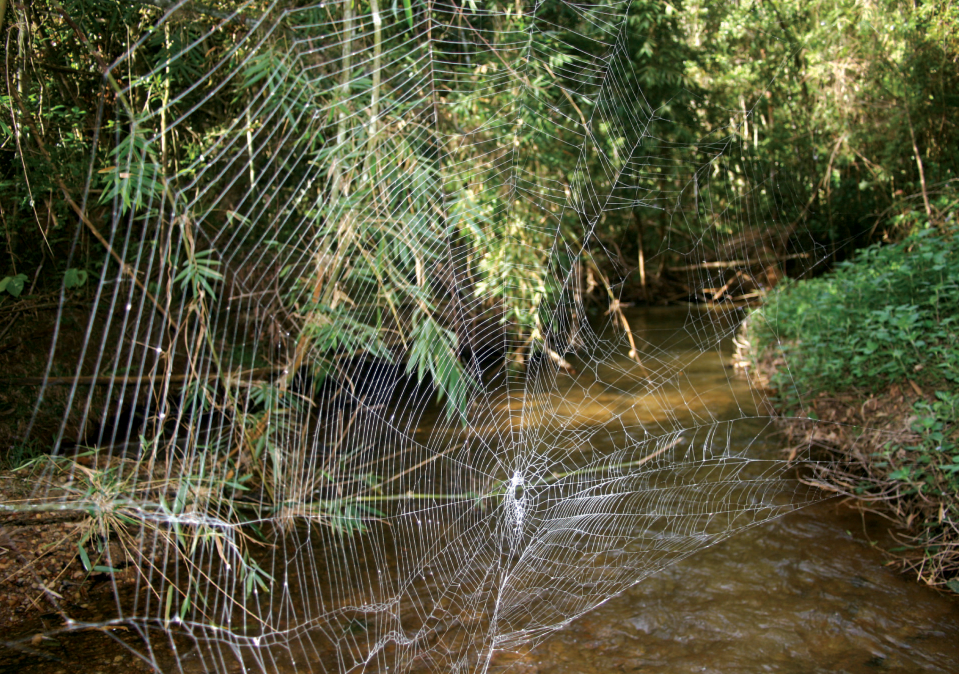
Web of C. darwini

== Species ==
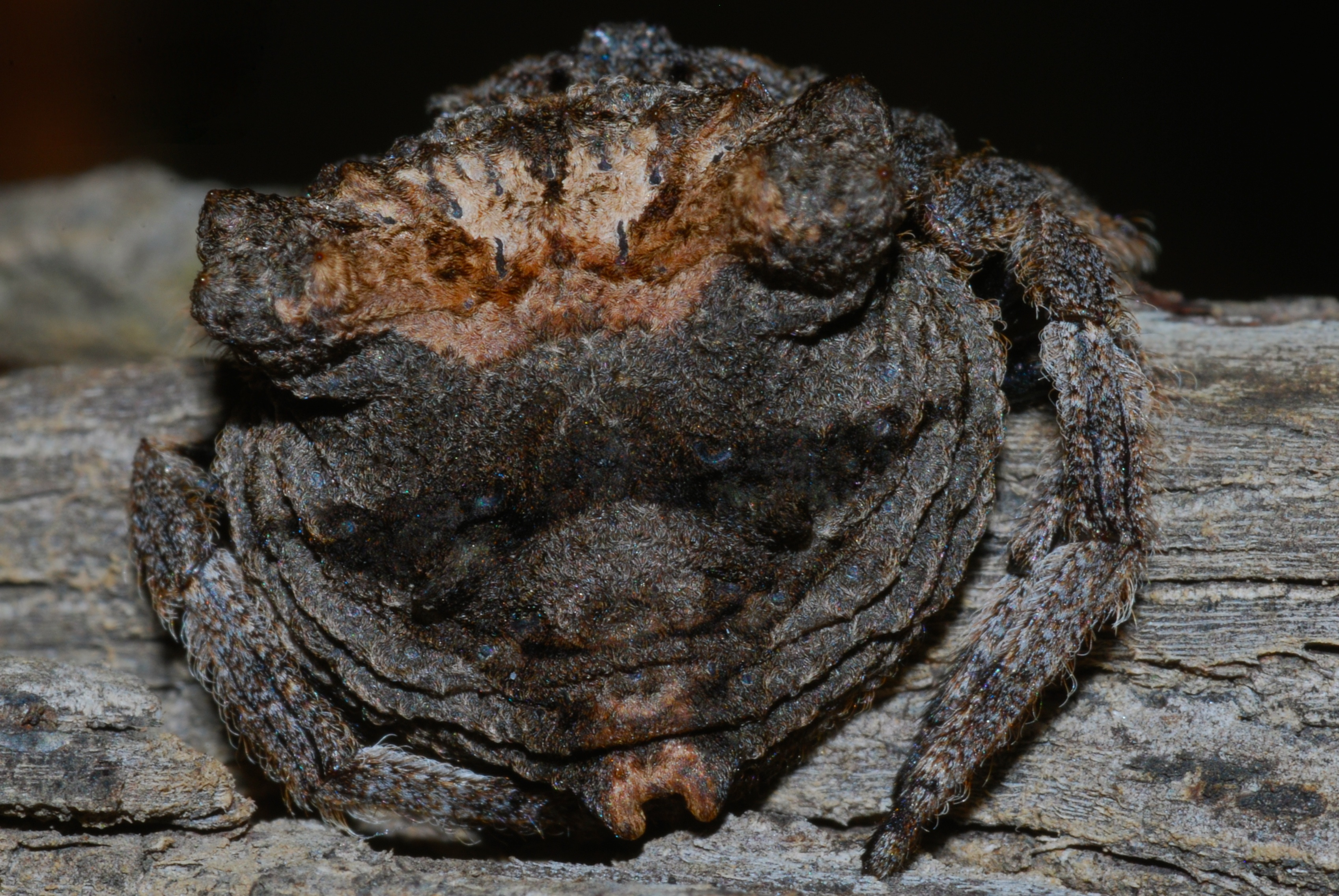
C. sexcuspidata on bark

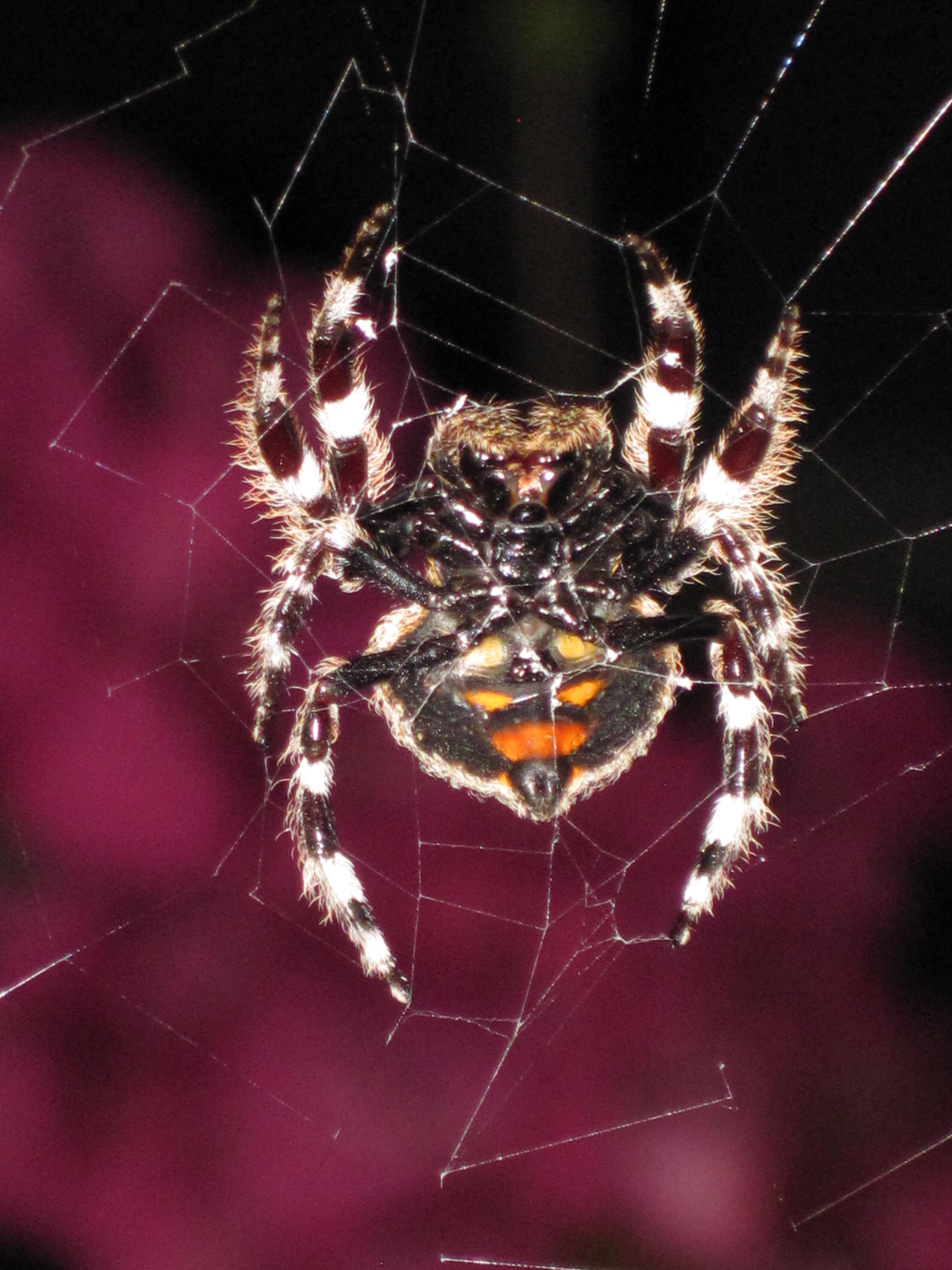
C. sexcuspidata

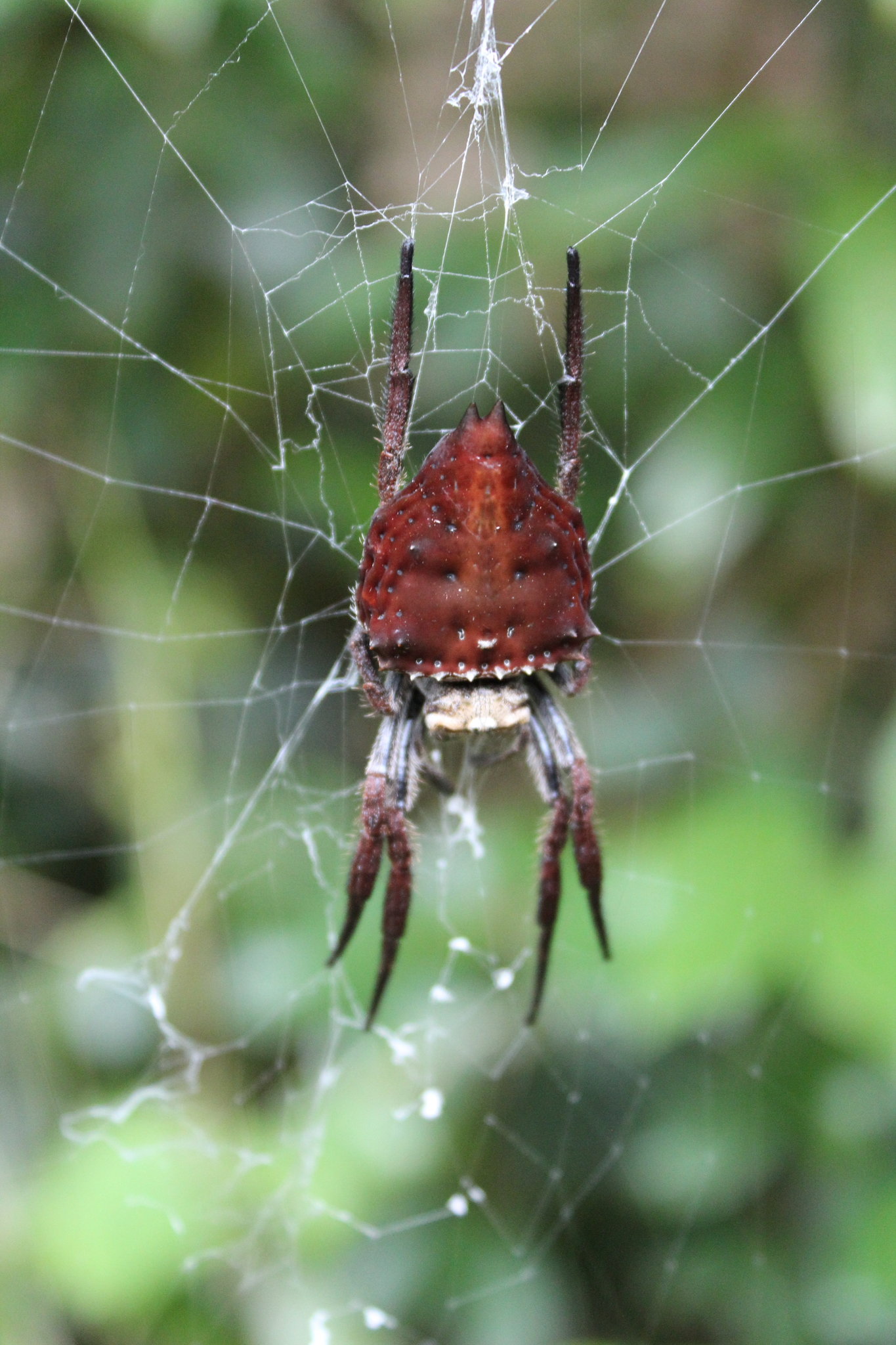
C. extrusa

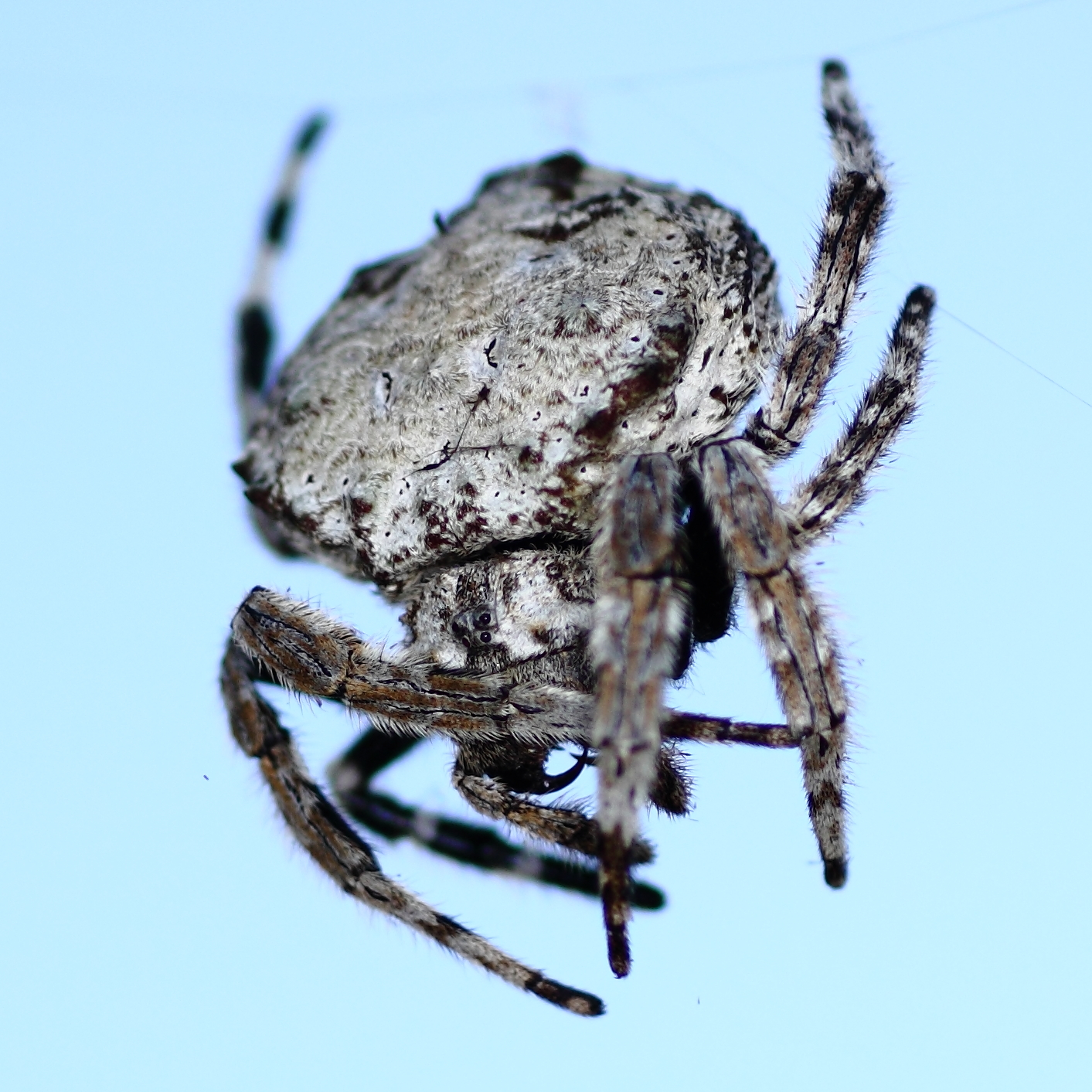
Caerostris sp.

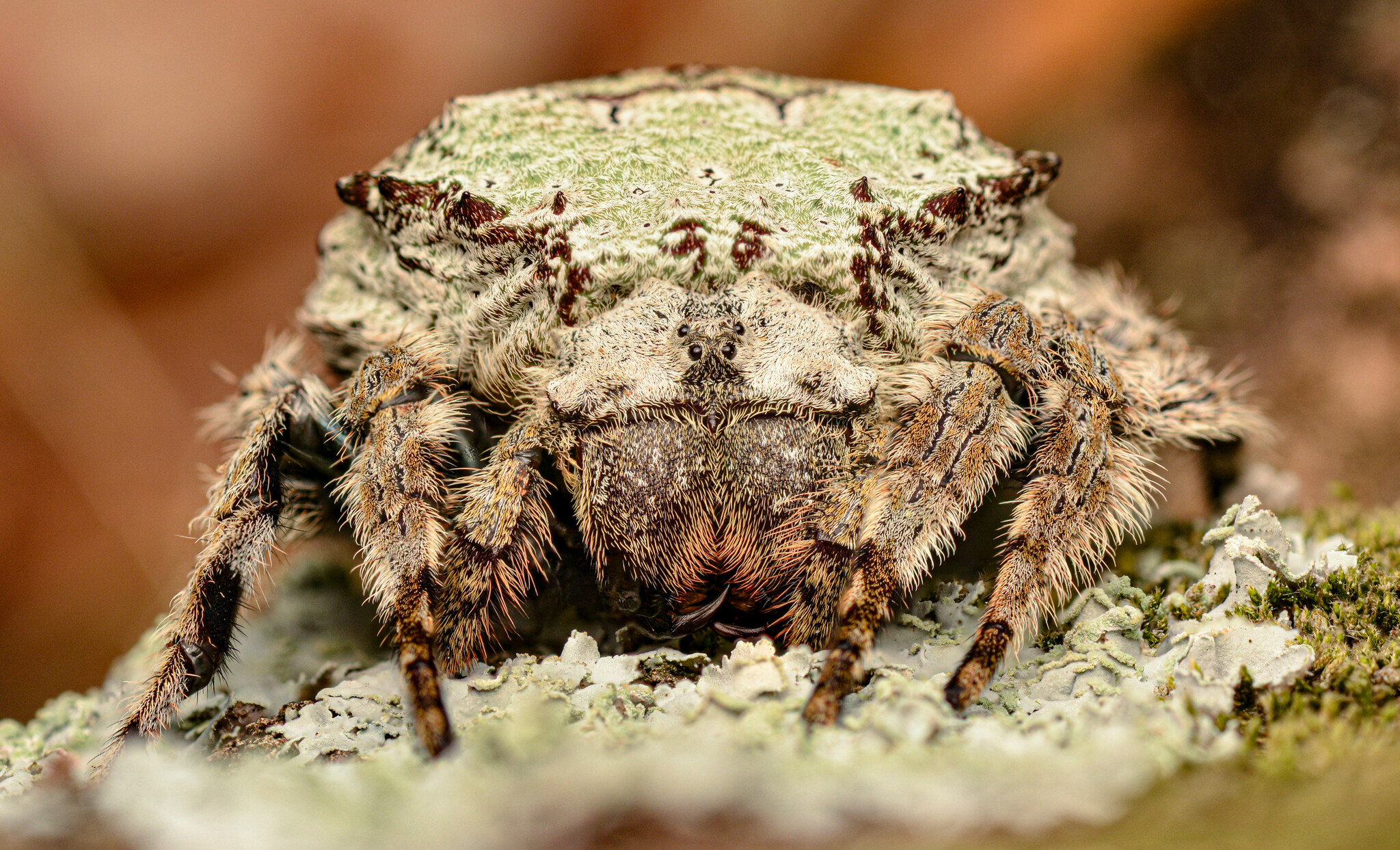
C. vicina

As of November 2026, this genus includes twenty species:

- Caerostris almae Gregorič, 2015 – Madagascar
- Caerostris bankana Strand, 1915 – Madagascar
- Caerostris bojani Gregorič, 2015 – Madagascar
- Caerostris corticosa Pocock, 1902 – Namibia, Botswana, Zimbabwe, South Africa, Eswatini
- Caerostris cowani Butler, 1882 – Madagascar
- Caerostris darwini Kuntner & Agnarsson, 2010 – Madagascar
- Caerostris ecclesiigera Butler, 1882 – Madagascar
- Caerostris extrusa Butler, 1882 – Madagascar
- Caerostris hirsuta (Simon, 1895) – Madagascar
- Caerostris indica Strand, 1915 – Myanmar
- Caerostris kuntneri Gregorič & Yu, 2025 – Madagascar
- Caerostris linnaeus Gregorič, 2015 – Mozambique
- Caerostris mayottensis Grasshoff, 1984 – Comoros, Mayotte
- Caerostris mitralis (Vinson, 1863) – Tanzania, DR Congo, Mozambique, Madagascar (type species)
- Caerostris pero Gregorič, 2015 – Madagascar
- Caerostris sexcuspidata (Fabricius, 1793) – Cameroon, Ethiopia, South Africa, Seychelles, Comoros, Madagascar
- Caerostris sumatrana Strand, 1915 – India, China, Laos, Malaysia, Borneo, Indonesia (Sumatra, Java)
- Caerostris tinamaze Gregorič, 2015 – South Africa
- Caerostris vicina (Blackwall, 1866) – Sub-Saharan Africa
- Caerostris wallacei Gregorič, Blackledge, Agnarsson & Kuntner, 2015 – Madagascar
