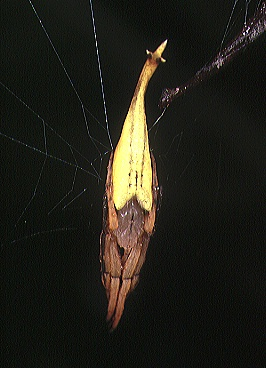
- Female A. melanura in Okinawa.

Scientific classification
- Kingdom: Animalia
- Phylum: Arthropoda
- Subphylum: Chelicerata
- Class: Arachnida
- Order: Araneae
- Infraorder: Araneomorphae
- Family: Araneidae
- Genus: Arachnura
- Species: A. melanura

Binomial name
- Arachnura melanura Simon, 1867

= Arachnura melanura =

Species of spider

Arachnura melanura, also known as scorpion tailed orb-weaver, black tail spider and drag tail spider is a species of spider in the family Araneidae. It ranges from India to Japan to Sulawesi. It camouflages itself by mimicking fallen flowers, dead leaves and twigs. It replaces the capture spiral of its web daily.
