= Caerostris tinamaze =

Gregoric's Bark Spider

Conservation status
- Vulnerable (SANBI Red List)

Scientific classification
- Kingdom: Animalia
- Phylum: Arthropoda
- Subphylum: Chelicerata
- Class: Arachnida
- Order: Araneae
- Infraorder: Araneomorphae
- Family: Araneidae
- Genus: Caerostris
- Species: C. tinamaze

Binomial name
- Caerostris tinamaze Gregorič, 2015

Species of spider

Caerostris tinamaze is a species of spider in the family Araneidae. It is endemic to South Africa and is commonly known as Gregoric's bark spider.

== Distribution ==
Caerostris tinamaze is known only from the type locality, Entabeni State Forest in Limpopo, South Africa, at an elevation of 1,362 m above sea level.

== Habitat and ecology ==
The species builds large orb webs, usually between trees. The examined specimens inhabited an afromontane forest fragment in a pine plantation in the Savanna biome.

== Conservation ==
Caerostris tinamaze is listed as Vulnerable by the South African National Biodiversity Institute due to its small distribution range. The type locality is surrounded by habitats transformed by silviculture. The species is possibly under-sampled or more specimens might be housed in collections that have not been correctly identified.

== Taxonomy ==
The species was described by Gregorič in 2015 from Entabeni State Forest.
