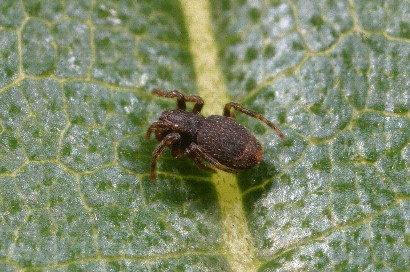
- male

Scientific classification
- Kingdom: Animalia
- Phylum: Arthropoda
- Subphylum: Chelicerata
- Class: Arachnida
- Order: Araneae
- Infraorder: Araneomorphae
- Family: Araneidae
- Genus: Arachnura
- Species: A. logio

Binomial name
- Arachnura logio Yaginuma, 1956

= Arachnura logio =

Species of spider

Arachnura logio (Japanese: Kijiro o-hiki-gumo) is a species of scorpion spider of the family Araneidae. It ranges from China to Japan.
