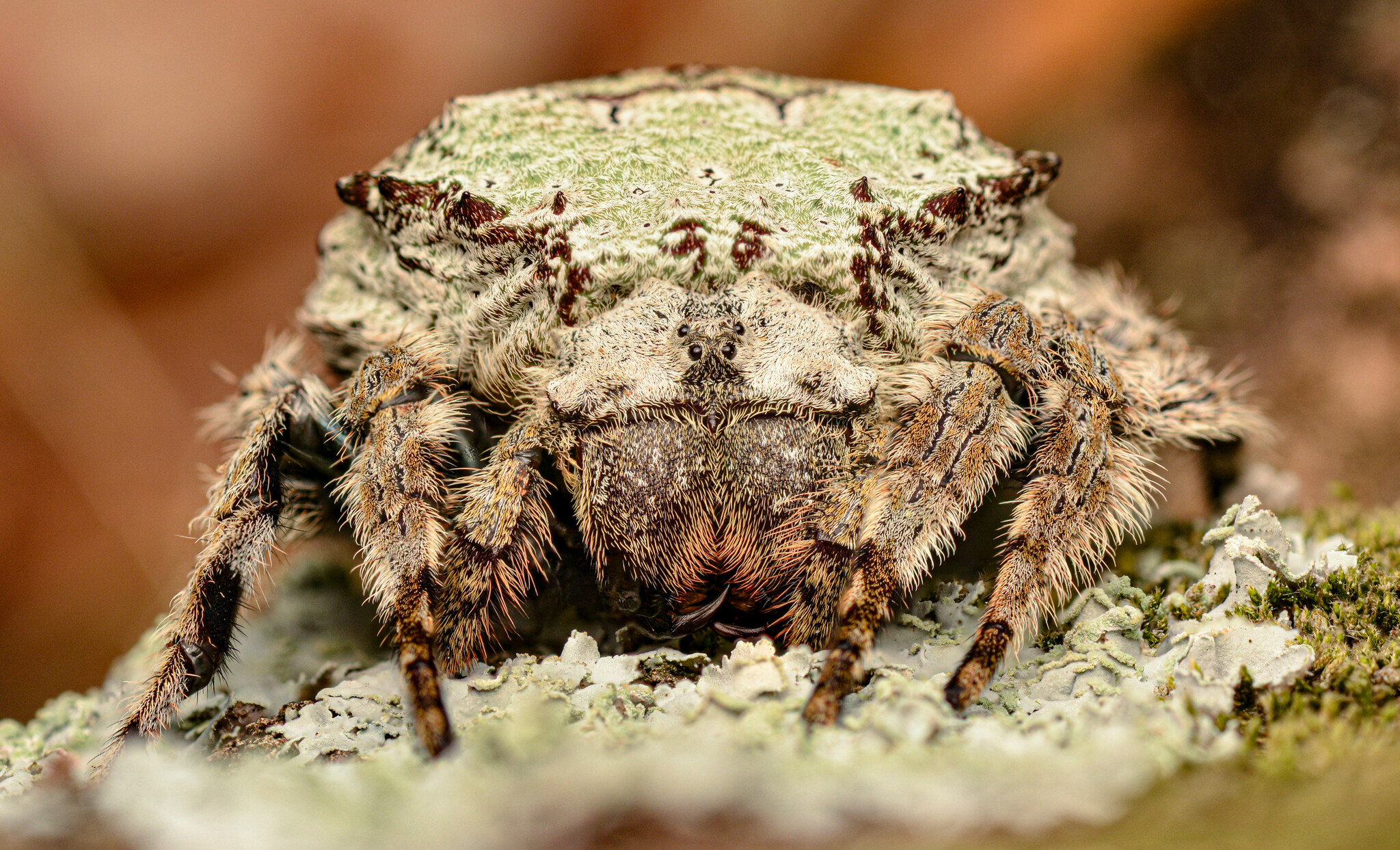
- female
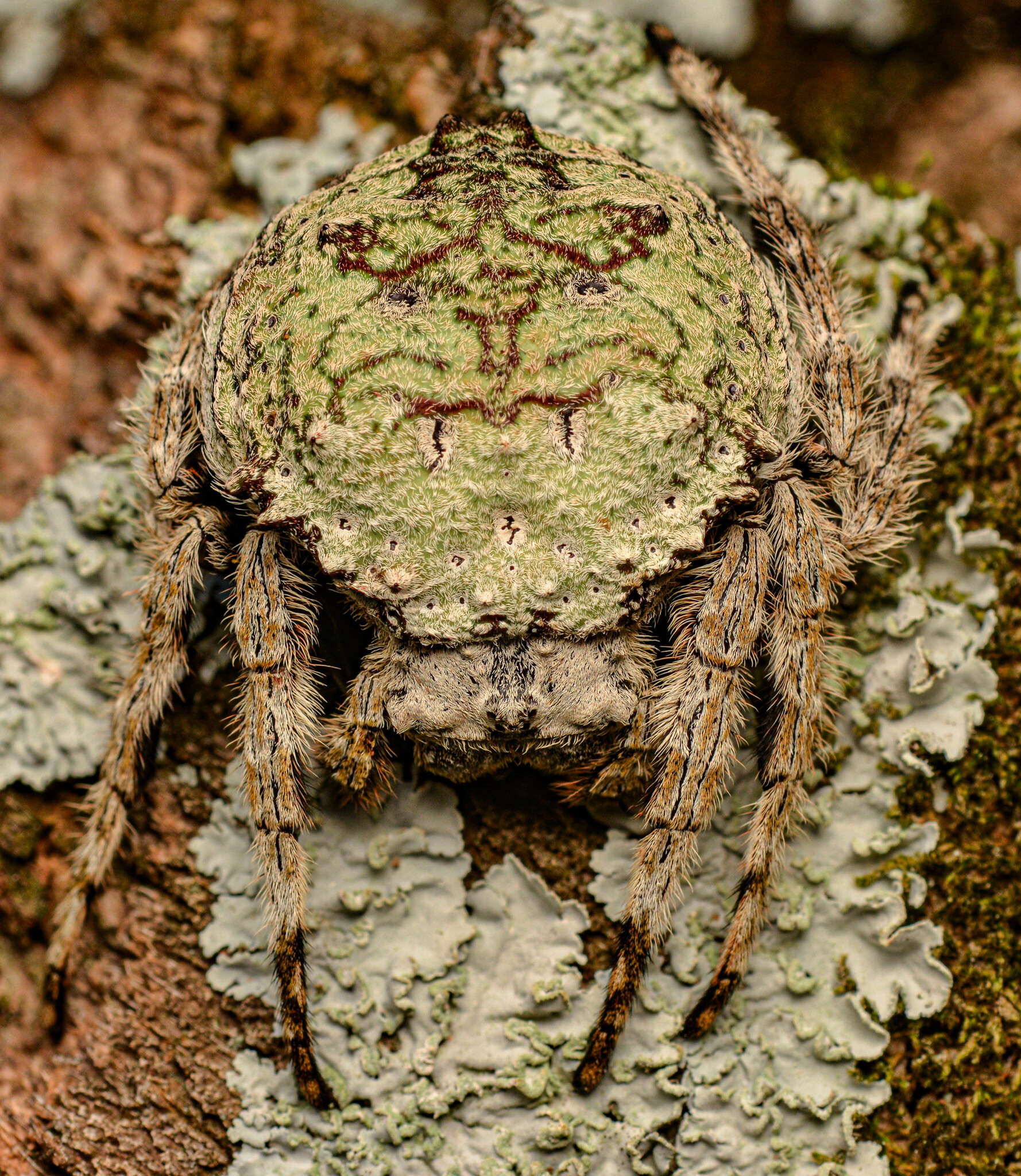
- female

Scientific classification
- Kingdom: Animalia
- Phylum: Arthropoda
- Subphylum: Chelicerata
- Class: Arachnida
- Order: Araneae
- Infraorder: Araneomorphae
- Family: Araneidae
- Genus: Caerostris
- Species: C. vicina

Binomial name
- Caerostris vicina (Blackwall, 1866)

Synonyms
- Eurysoma vicina Blackwall, 1866; Caerostris vinsonii Thorell, 1868; Caerostris albiceps O. Pickard-Cambridge, 1891; Caerostris simata Bösenberg & Lenz, 1895; Caerostris nodulosa Pocock, 1898; Caerostris turriger Pocock, 1900; Caerostris albescens Pocock, 1900; Caerostris darlingi Pocock, 1902; Caerostris columnifer Pocock, 1902; Caerostris albescens flavicomis Simon, 1903; Caerostris subsimata Strand, 1906; Caerostris amanica Strand, 1907

= Caerostris vicina =

Rugose Bark Spider

Species of spider

Caerostris vicina is a species of spider in the family Araneidae. It is endemic to Africa and is commonly known as the rugose bark spider.

== Distribution ==
Caerostris vicina is known from several countries throughout sub-Saharan Africa. In South Africa, the species is known from three provinces at elevations ranging from 20 to 893 m above sea level.

== Habitat and ecology ==
The species constructs large orb webs 1.0-1.5 m in diameter during the night. The web is removed early in the morning, with only a strong bridge line remaining between trees during the day when the female retreats to a branch. With legs arranged neatly around the body, the spider blends in well with its surroundings. The species inhabits Forest and Savanna biomes.

== Description ==
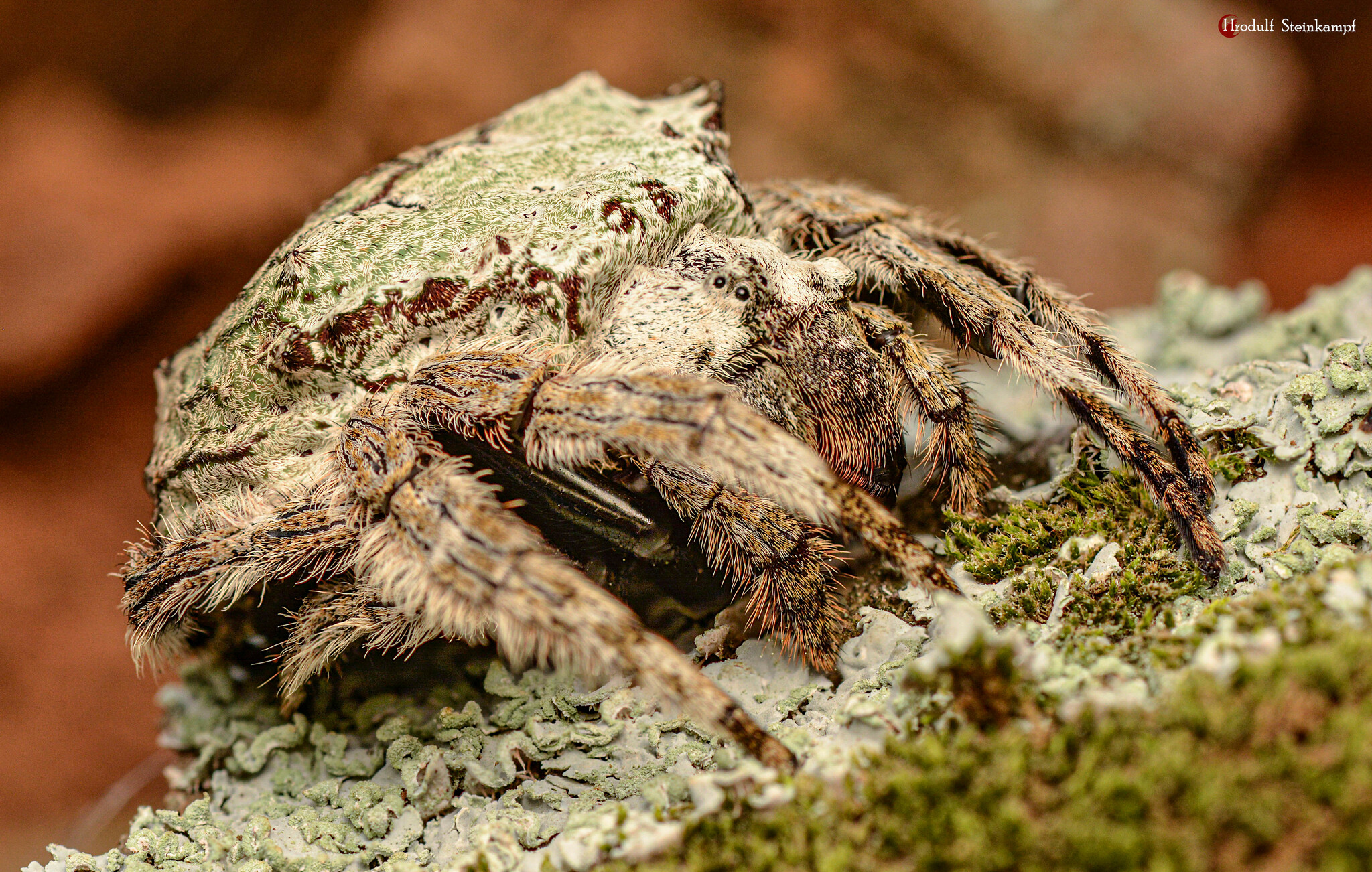
female

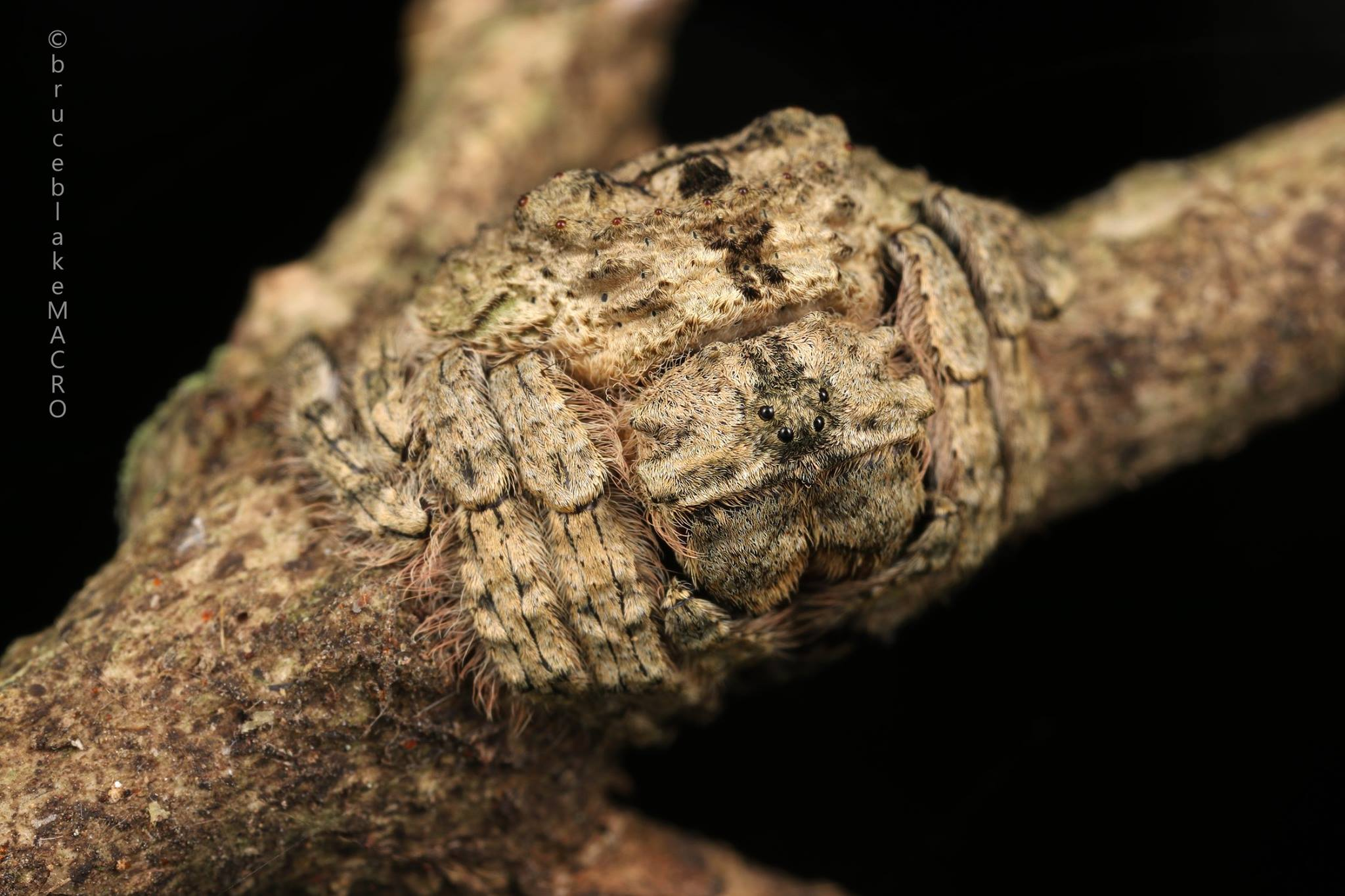

In the female, the carapace is greyish brown with tubercles in the eye region. The abdomen is dorsally flattened with small tubercles and ventrally without distinct white spots. The legs are the same colour as the carapace, with femur IV bearing spatulate setae on the posterior edge.

== Conservation ==
Caerostris vicina is listed as Least Concern by the South African National Biodiversity Institute due to its wide geographical range. The species is protected in areas including iSimangaliso Wetland Park, Ndumo Game Reserve, and Tembe Elephant Park.

== Taxonomy ==
The species was originally described by Blackwall in 1866 as Eurysoma vicina. It was revised by Grasshoff in 1984, who synonymized numerous. Levi transferred the species to Caerostris in 1996.
