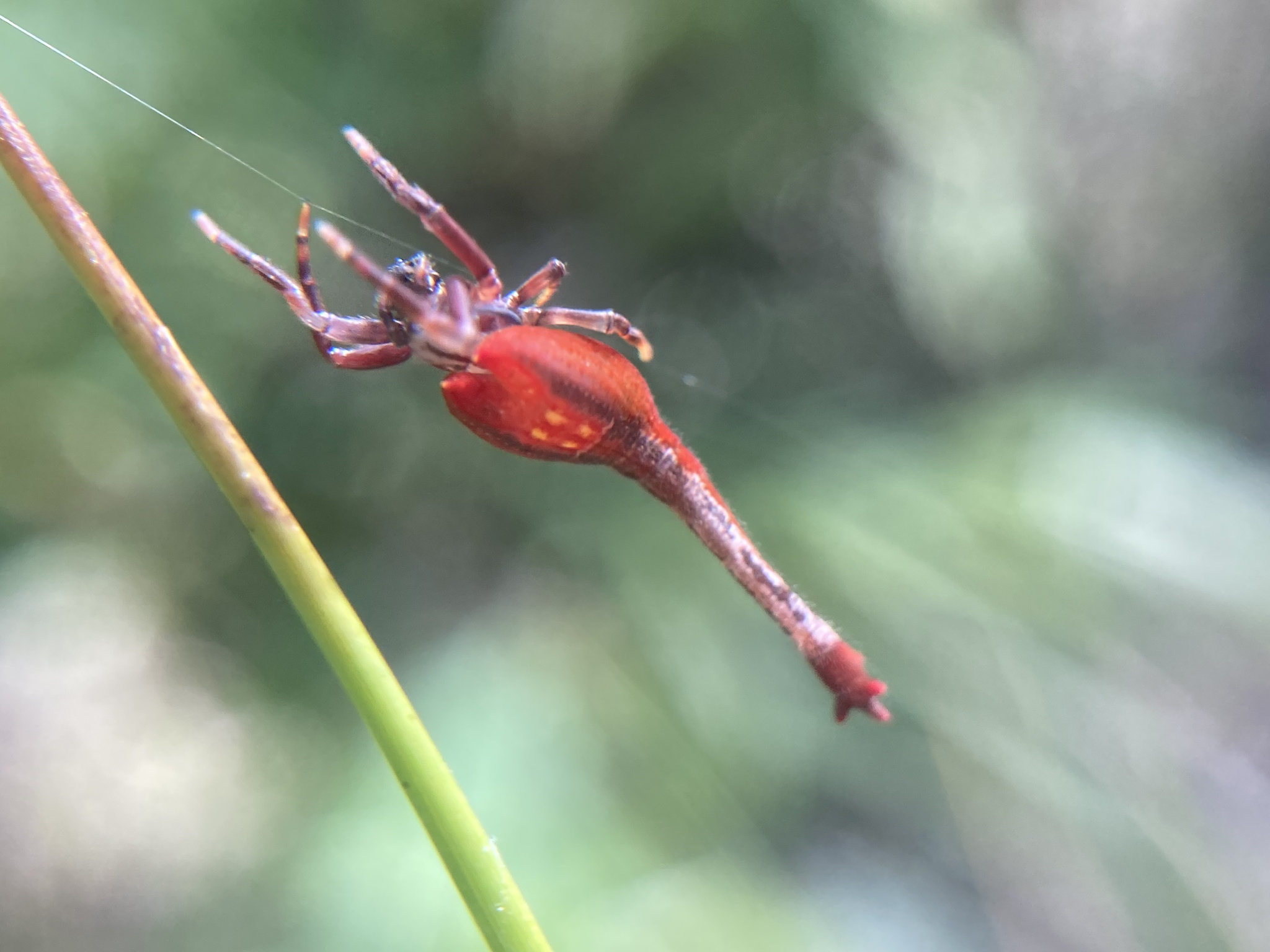
- Female
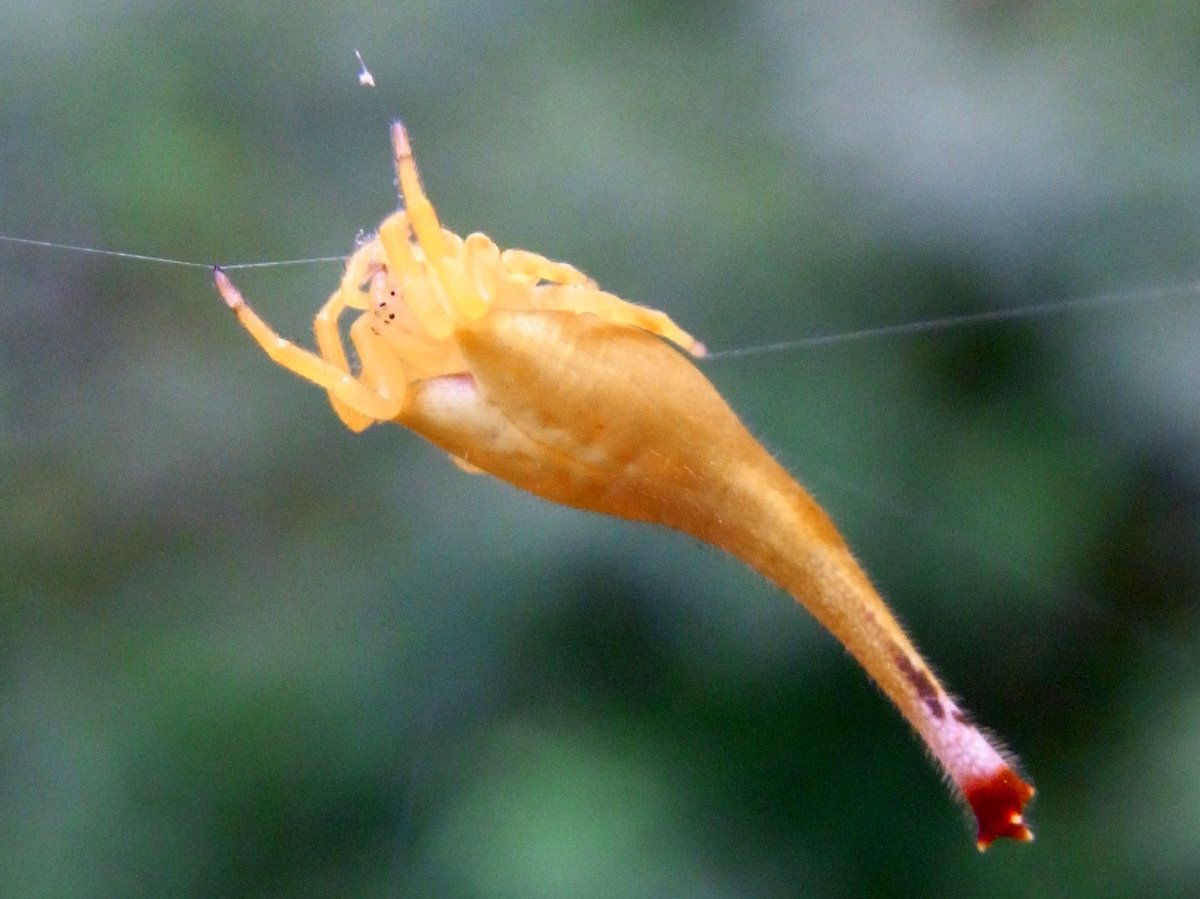
- Female juvenile

Scientific classification
- Kingdom: Animalia
- Phylum: Arthropoda
- Subphylum: Chelicerata
- Class: Arachnida
- Order: Araneae
- Infraorder: Araneomorphae
- Family: Araneidae
- Genus: Arachnura
- Species: A. higginsi

Binomial name
- Arachnura higginsi (Koch, 1872)

Synonyms
- Epeira higginsii; Arachnura higginsii

= Arachnura higginsi =

Species of spider

Arachnura higginsi, known as the tailed spider or scorpion tailed spider and the scorpion orb weaver, is a common Australian spider belonging to the family Araneidae. It occurs in many parts of Australia.

== Description and habit ==
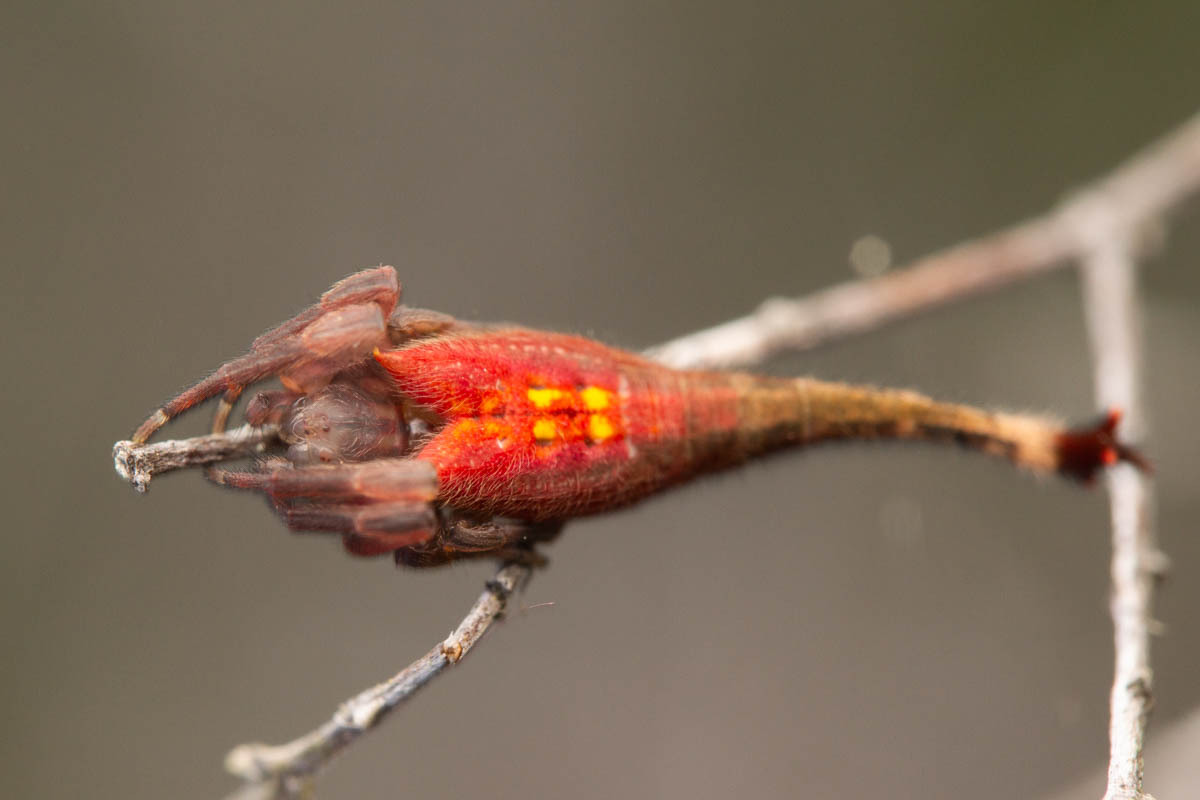
female

The body length of the female is around 16 mm with the male being much smaller at around 2 mm. Body colour varies between individuals and may range from cream through brown to black, sometimes with a brightly coloured yellow to red patch on the top of the abdomen. Juveniles may be more brightly coloured.

Only the females possess a tail and this increases in length with each moult. The prominent tail looks somewhat similar to that of a scorpion but has no sting and the spider is not considered to be dangerous to humans.

The spider's web is usually located close to the ground, and may be oriented vertically, on an angle, or sometimes horizontally. The spider's usual prey consists of small flying insects.

The female deposits between 50 and 60 eggs in an egg sac, of which there may be as many as eight distributed across missing sectors of the web. The sacs are oval in shape, 5 mm x 4 mm of tough, brown silk with a woolly appearance. The eggs are creamy in colour, 0.8mm in diameter, and not sticky.
