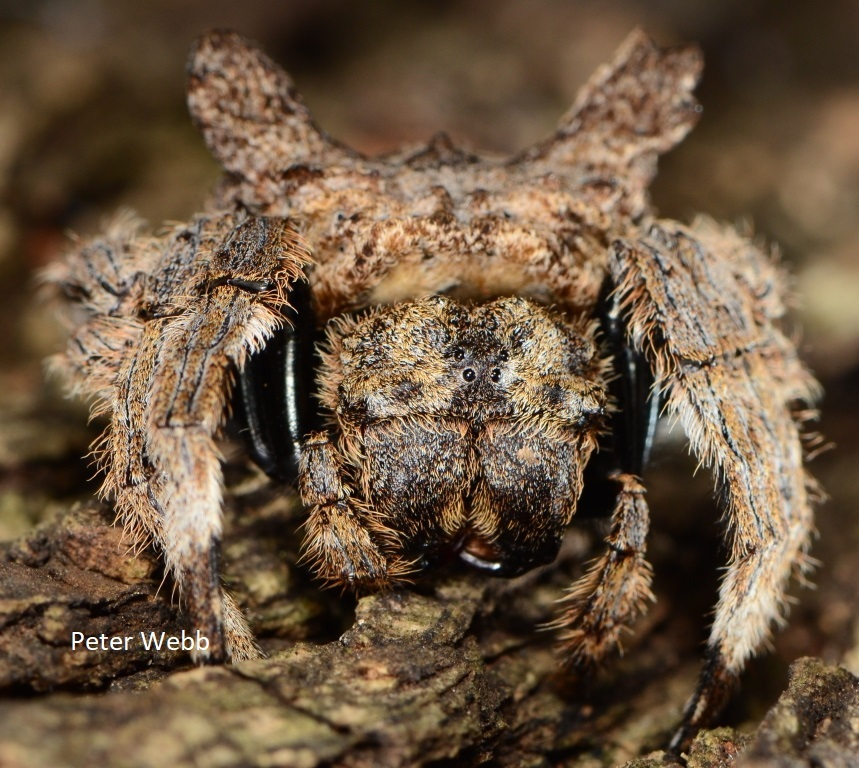
- female from South Africa
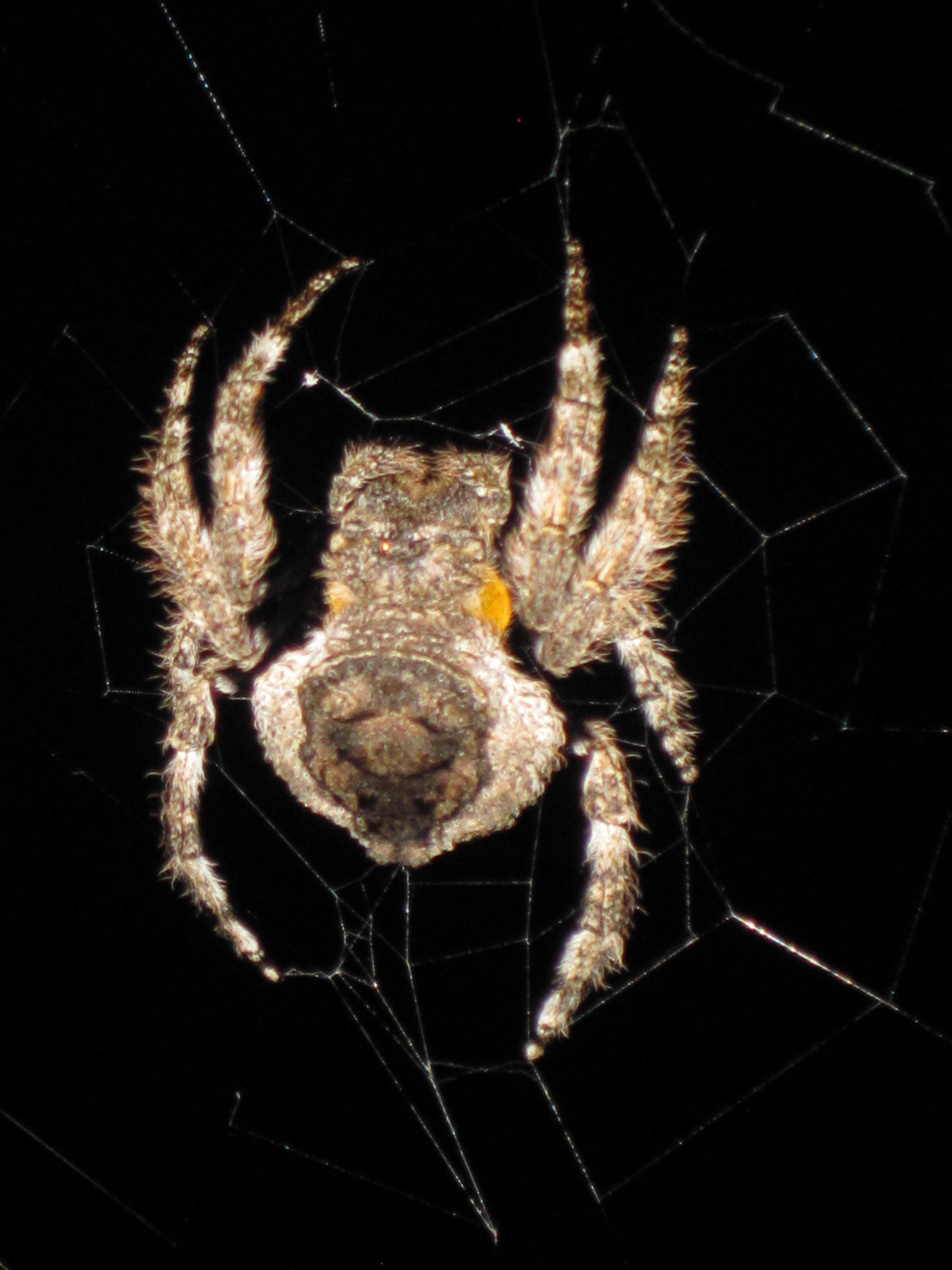
- C. sexcuspidata in web

Conservation status
- Least Concern (SANBI Red List)

Scientific classification
- Kingdom: Animalia
- Phylum: Arthropoda
- Subphylum: Chelicerata
- Class: Arachnida
- Order: Araneae
- Infraorder: Araneomorphae
- Family: Araneidae
- Genus: Caerostris
- Species: C. sexcuspidata

Binomial name
- Caerostris sexcuspidata (Fabricius, 1793)

Synonyms
- C. sexcuspidata synonyms: Aranea sexcuspidata Fabricius, 1793; Gasteracantha sexcuspidata C. L. Koch, 1837; Epeira imperialis Walckenaer, 1841; Eurysoma sexcuspidata C. L. Koch, 1850; Epeira tuberculosa Vinson, 1863; Caerostris mitralis humilis Thorell, 1868; Caerostris mitralis turrigera Thorell, 1868; Caerostris wahlbergii Thorell, 1868; Caerostris keyserlingii Thorell, 1868; Caerostris femoralis Thorell, 1899; Caerostris argostictus Pocock, 1900; Caerostris mimicus Strand, 1906; Caerostris kibonotensis Tullgren, 1910; Caerostris schubotzi Strand, 1913; Caerostris insularis Strand, 1913; Caerostris voeltzkowi Strand, 1916; Caerostris hnatiukae Roberts, 1983

= Caerostris sexcuspidata =

Horned Bark Spider

Species of spider

Caerostris sexcuspidata is a species of spider in the family Araneidae. It is endemic to Africa and is commonly known as the horned bark spider.

== Distribution ==
Caerostris sexcuspidata occurs throughout Africa from Cameroon to Ethiopia and south to South Africa, as well as in the Seychelles, Comoros, and Madagascar. In South Africa, the species is known from all nine provinces at elevations ranging from 1 to 2,785 m above sea level.

== Habitat and ecology ==
The species builds large orb webs, usually between trees. Being a mainly nocturnal species, they rest on tree bark during the day, where their brown colouration provides effective camouflage. During daylight hours they dismantle their web and retire to a nearby branch, tucking the legs, which are covered with fine hair, against the body, to blend with the surroundings to resemble part of a branch, complete with growth bulges. Though mainly nocturnal, these spiders may be found on their webs in shady, forested areas during the day.

The species has been collected from various crops including apple, citrus, pine plantations and tomatoes. During a study at Richards Bay, KwaZulu-Natal, C. sexcuspidata with 333 specimens was the most abundant Araneidae species in rehabilitating dune forests, with webs particularly abundant in 2-year and 8-year old stands.

== Description ==
Caerostris species are grey or brown with horny or leathery protuberances on their carapace and abdomen, resembling bark. They also bear a very hairy appearance. The carapace in the upper cephalic region has a transversal row of four conical protuberances. The abdomen is round oval and the dorsal plane varies in shape. The legs are provided with rows of long setae that fit snugly around the body when resting.

The dorsal surface is cryptically coloured with horny projections which aid in camouflage; legs are drably coloured seen from above and clearly zebra-striped when viewed from beneath. Also viewing from beneath, a red marking can be found on the ophistosoma. The common bark spider is the most widespread of the bark spiders found in Southern Africa and shows considerable variation in abdomen shape. The abdomen protrudes over the carapace, while the eight small eyes are located on a tubercle at the front of the carapace.

== Conservation ==
Caerostris sexcuspidata is listed as Least Concern by the South African National Biodiversity Institute due to its wide geographical distribution. The species is protected in more than 20 protected areas.

== Taxonomy ==
The species was originally described by Johan Christian Fabricius in 1793 as Aranea sexcuspidata. It was revised by Grasshoff in 1984, who synonymized numerous species.
