= Vicina =

Vicina may refer to:

- Vicina (town), a former Genoese port on the Lower Danube, in modern Romania
- Carpatolechia, a genus of moth with synonym Vicina
