= Auguste Vinson =

French physician and naturalist

Jean-Dominique-Philippe-Auguste Vinson (4 August 1819, Sainte-Suzanne, Réunion – 27 August 1903, Saint-Denis, Réunion) was a French physician and naturalist. His father, François-Auguste Vinson (1791–1851), was a noted physician and politician.

He was educated in Saint-Denis, Nantes and Paris, where he studied medicine under Alfred Velpeau. After finishing his studies in France, he returned to Saint-Denis.

In 1862 Vinson was sent to Madagascar by Napoleon III to attend the coronation of Radama II. While here, he conducted valuable investigations of the islands' flora and fauna.

As a naturalist, he is known for his research of Araneidae (orb-weaver spiders) native to Madagascar, Réunion and Mauritius. Vinson is also credited for being the first scientist to successively cultivate cinchona on Réunion. Vinson was a corresponding member of the Académie des Sciences.

== Selected works ==
- Aranéides des 'îles La Réunion, Maurice et Madagascar, avec 14 planches contenant 118 figures dessinées d'aprés nature, 1863 - Araneidae native to Réunion, Mauritius and Madagascar.
- Voyage à Madagascar au couronnement de Radama II, 1865 - Voyage to Madagascar for the coronation of Radama II.
- Mémoire sur les essais d'acclimatation des arbres à quinquina à l'île de la Réunion, 1875 - On acclimation of cinchona trees on Réunion.
- "Faune détruite. Les Aepiornidés et les Huppes de l’île Bourbon", 1877. Bulletin Hebdomadaire de l’Association Scientifique de France 20, 327–331.
- Salazie; ou, Le piton d'Anchaine, légende créole, 1888.
- Notes publiées par le Docteur Auguste Vinson, sur la Flore de l'île de la Réunion, 1896 - Published notes of Dr. Vinson in regards to the flora of Réunion.
