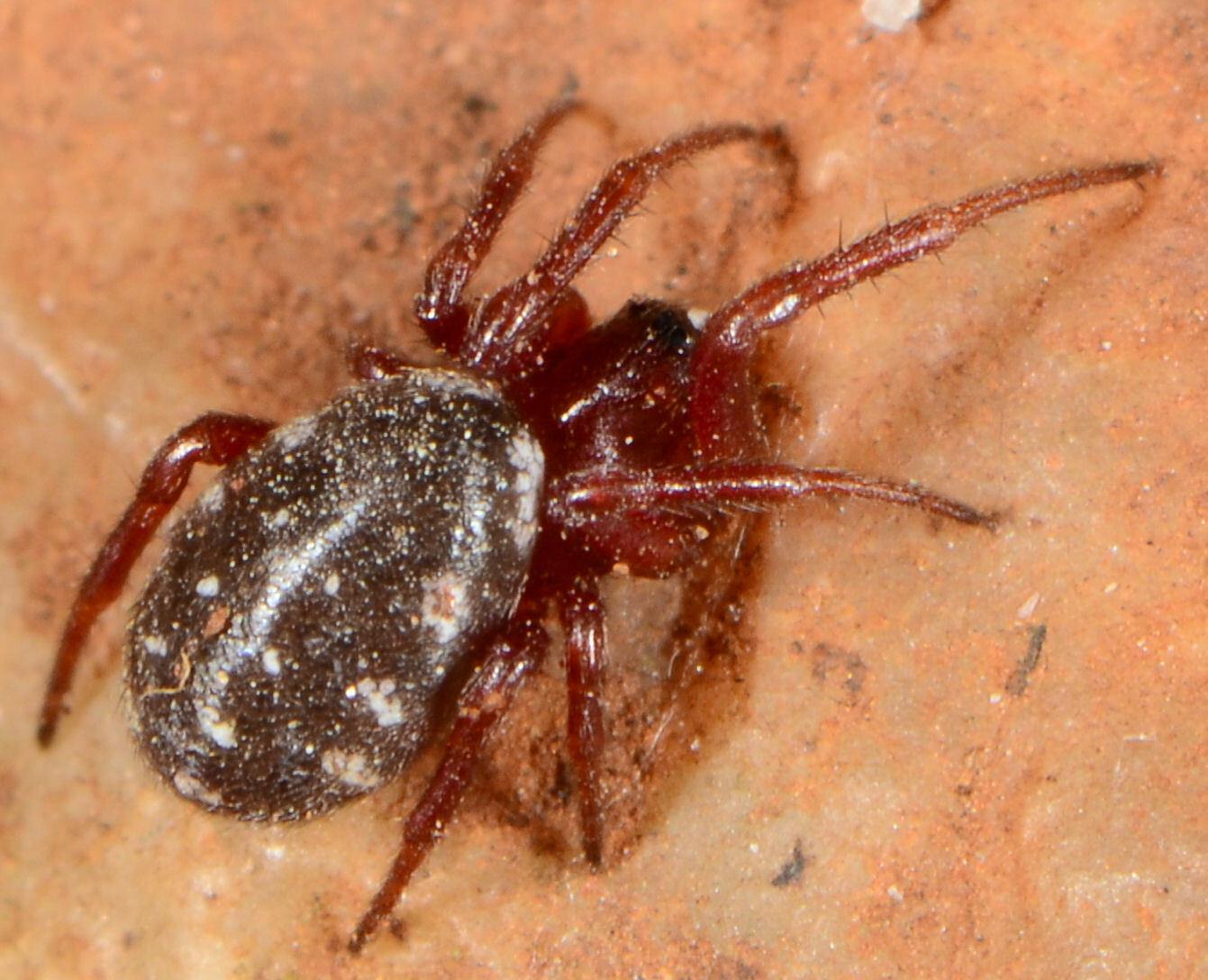
- Female
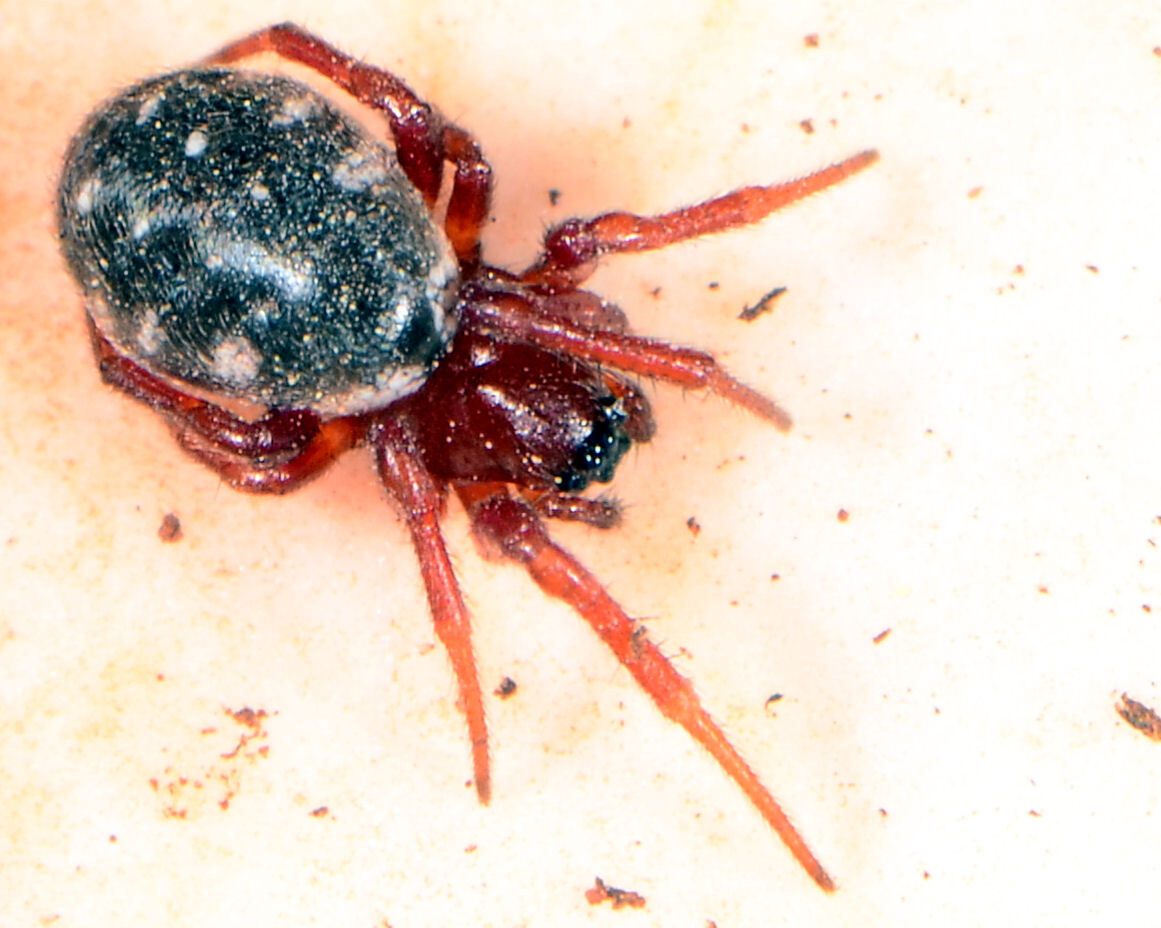
- Female

Scientific classification
- Kingdom: Animalia
- Phylum: Arthropoda
- Subphylum: Chelicerata
- Class: Arachnida
- Order: Araneae
- Infraorder: Araneomorphae
- Family: Araneidae
- Genus: Nemoscolus
- Species: N. vigintipunctatus

Binomial name
- Nemoscolus vigintipunctatus Simon, 1897

= Nemoscolus vigintipunctatus =

Spotted Stone-Nest Spider

Species of spider

Nemoscolus vigintipunctatus is a species of spider in the family Araneidae. It is commonly known as the spotted stone-nest spider.

== Distribution ==
Nemoscolus vigintipunctatus is a South African endemic originally described from the Transvaal region. The species occurs in Zimbabwe and South Africa, where it is found in eight provinces, Eastern Cape, Free State, Gauteng, KwaZulu-Natal, Limpopo, North West, and Western Cape. The species has a wide geographical range, occurring at altitudes ranging from 20 to 1,646 m above sea level.

== Habitat and ecology ==
Nemoscolus vigintipunctatus is an orb-web spider that makes a stone nest in the centre of the orb-web in grass. The stone nest observed in Irene was long and elongated. The species is found in the Fynbos, Forest, Indian Ocean Coastal Belt, Grassland, Savanna and Succulent Karoo biomes.

== Description ==
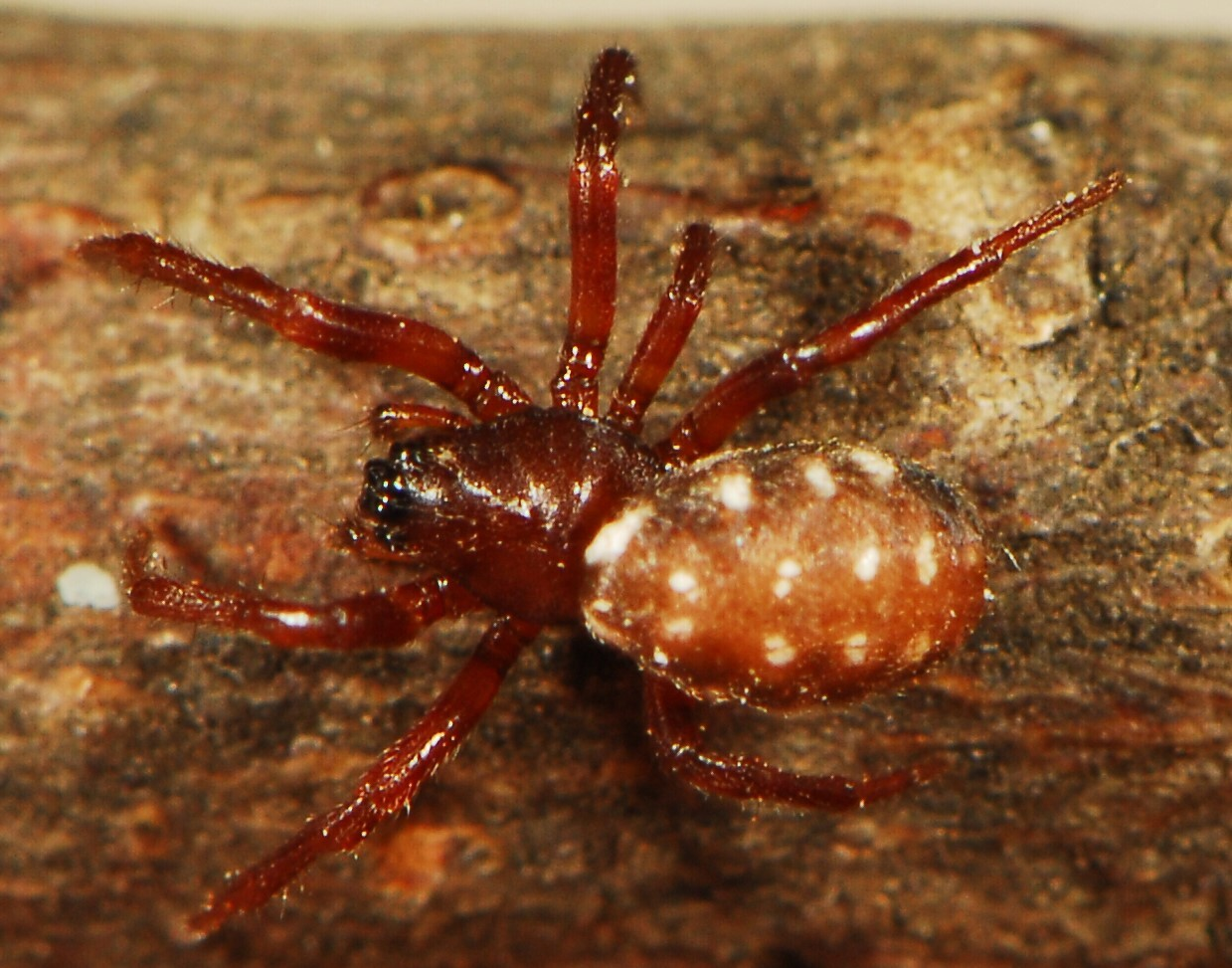
female

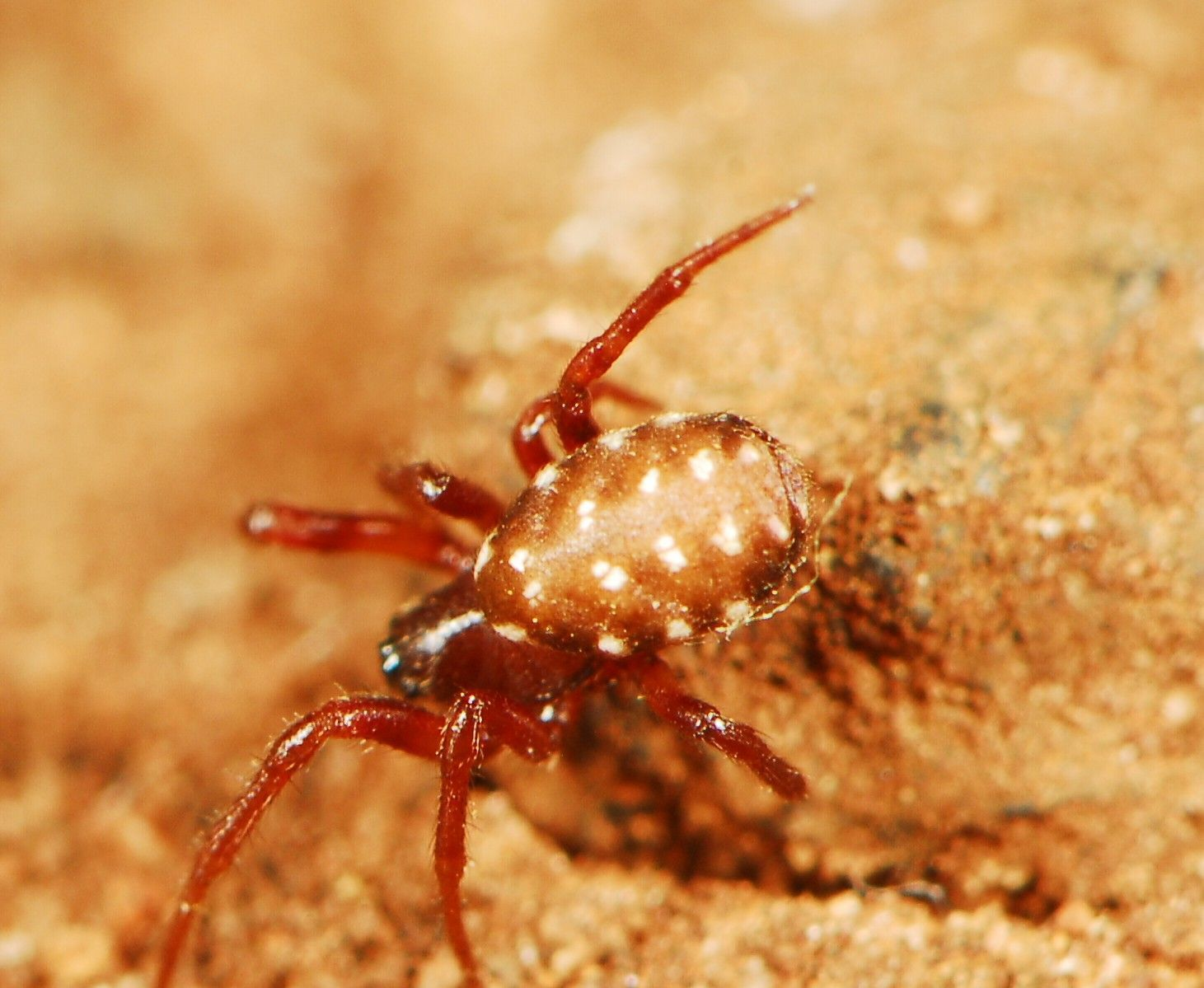
female

== Conservation ==
Nemoscolus vigintipunctatus is listed as Least Concern by the South African National Biodiversity Institute due to its wide geographical range. There are no known threats to the species. It is protected in seven protected areas including Makalali Nature Reserve, Lhuvhondo Nature Reserve and Kruger National Park.

== Etymology ==
The species name vigintipunctatus means "twenty-spotted" in Latin.

== Taxonomy ==
The species has not been revised and is known only from the female.
