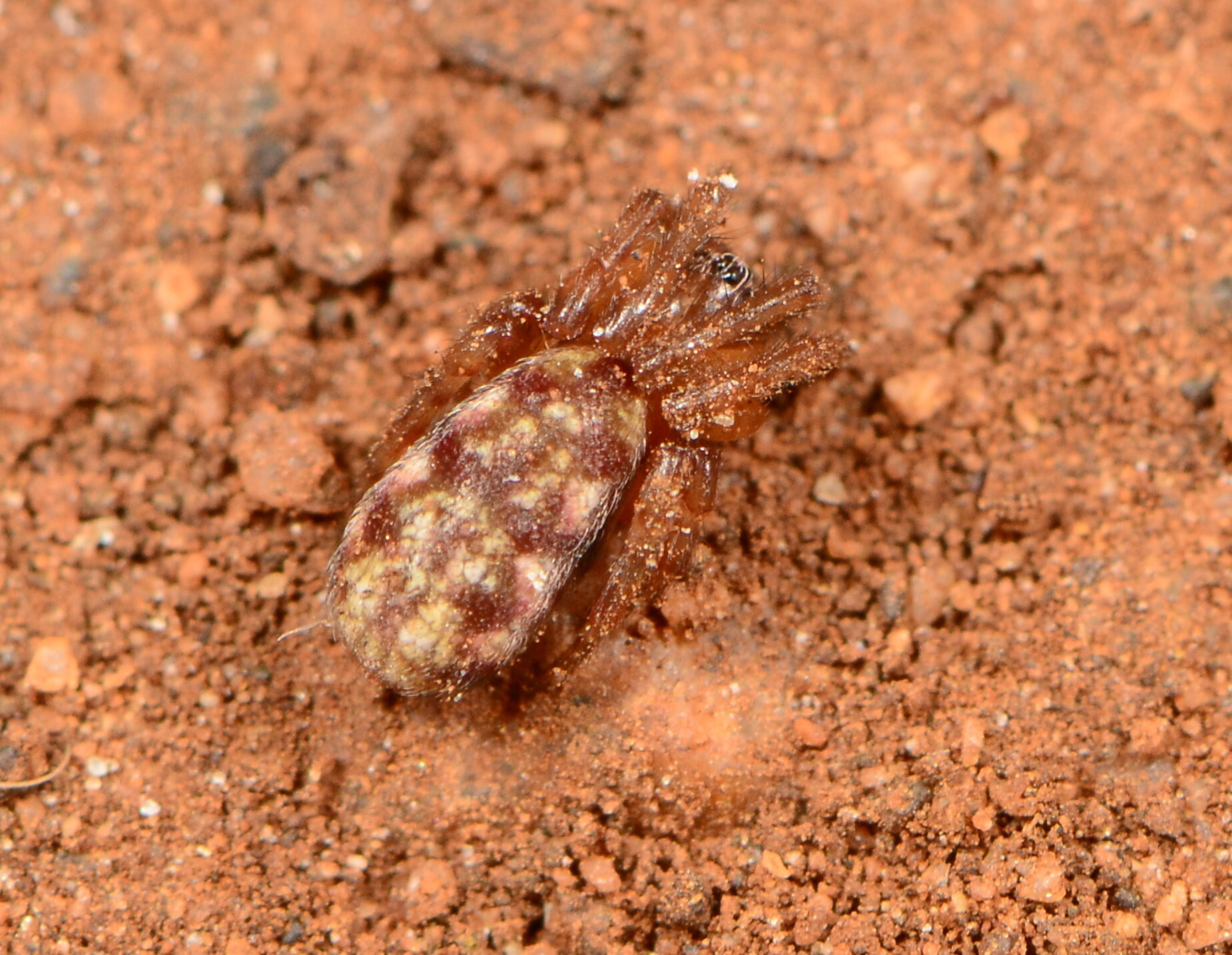
- Female
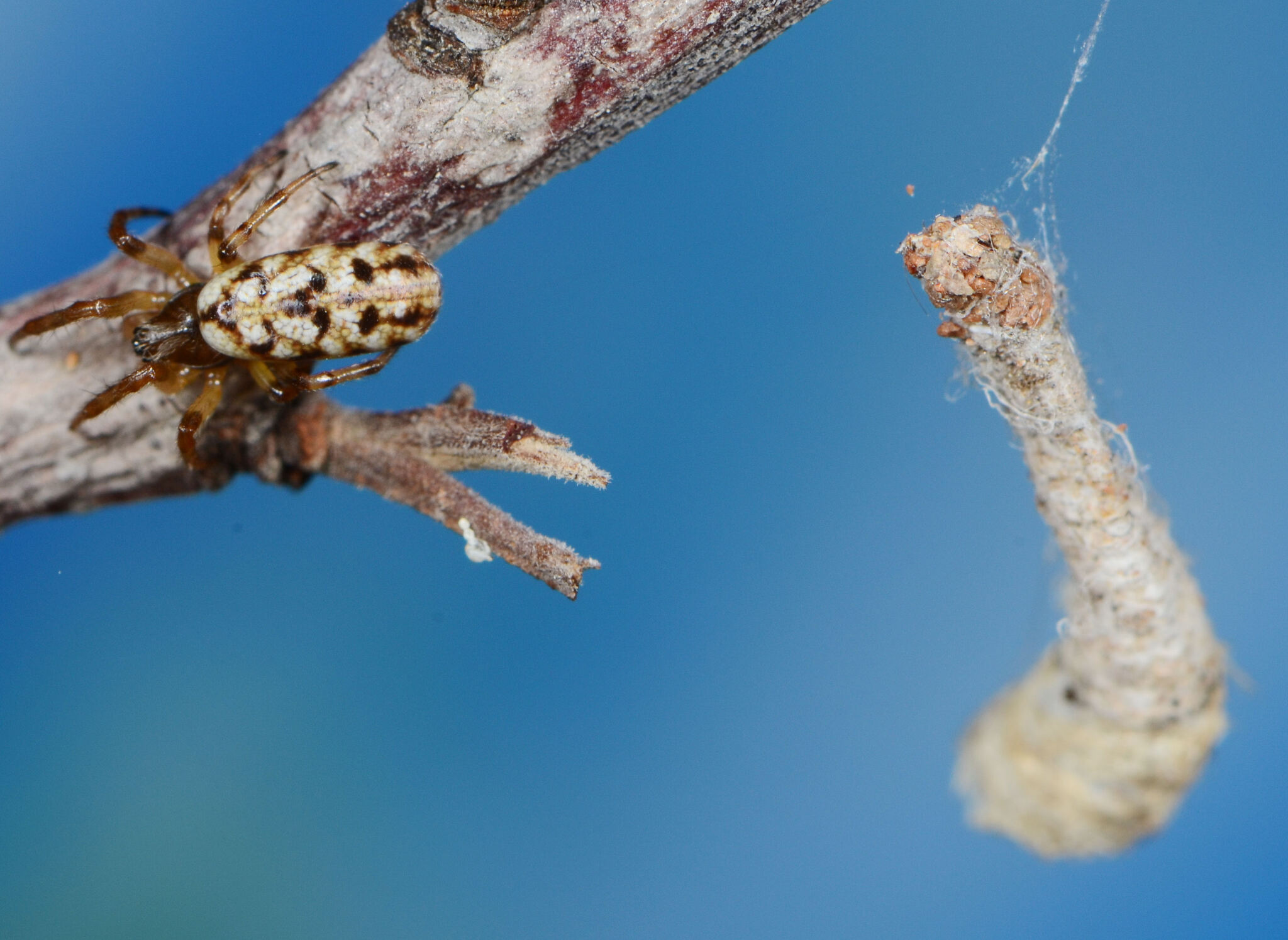
- Female with tube

Scientific classification
- Kingdom: Animalia
- Phylum: Arthropoda
- Subphylum: Chelicerata
- Class: Arachnida
- Order: Araneae
- Infraorder: Araneomorphae
- Family: Araneidae
- Genus: Nemoscolus
- Species: N. tubicola

Binomial name
- Nemoscolus tubicola (Simon, 1887)

Synonyms
- Cyclosa tubicola Simon, 1887

= Nemoscolus tubicola =

Tube Stone-Nest Spider

Species of spider

Nemoscolus tubicola is a species of spider in the family Araneidae. It is commonly known as the tube stone-nest spider.

== Distribution ==
Nemoscolus tubicola is a southern African endemic originally described from Grahamstown. The species occurs in Namibia, Eswatini and South Africa.

In South Africa, it is found in seven provinces, Eastern Cape, Gauteng, Limpopo, Northern Cape, North West, and Western Cape. It has a wide geographical range, occurring at altitudes ranging from 54 to 1,513 m above sea level.

== Habitat and ecology ==
Nemoscolus tubicola is an orb-web spider that makes a stone nest in the centre of the orb-web in grass. The species is found in the Fynbos, Grassland, Nama Karoo, Savanna, Succulent Karoo and Thicket biomes.

== Description ==
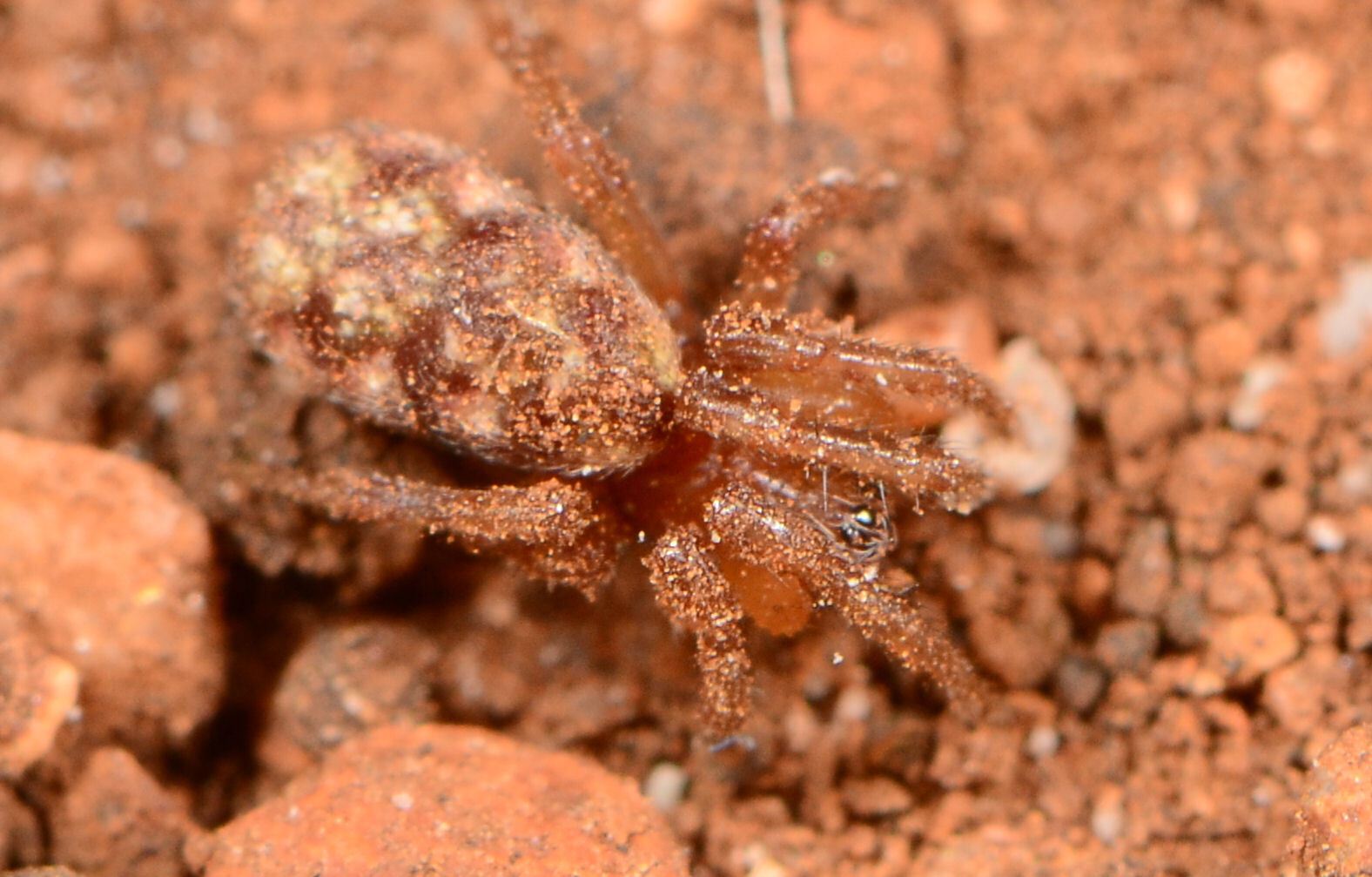

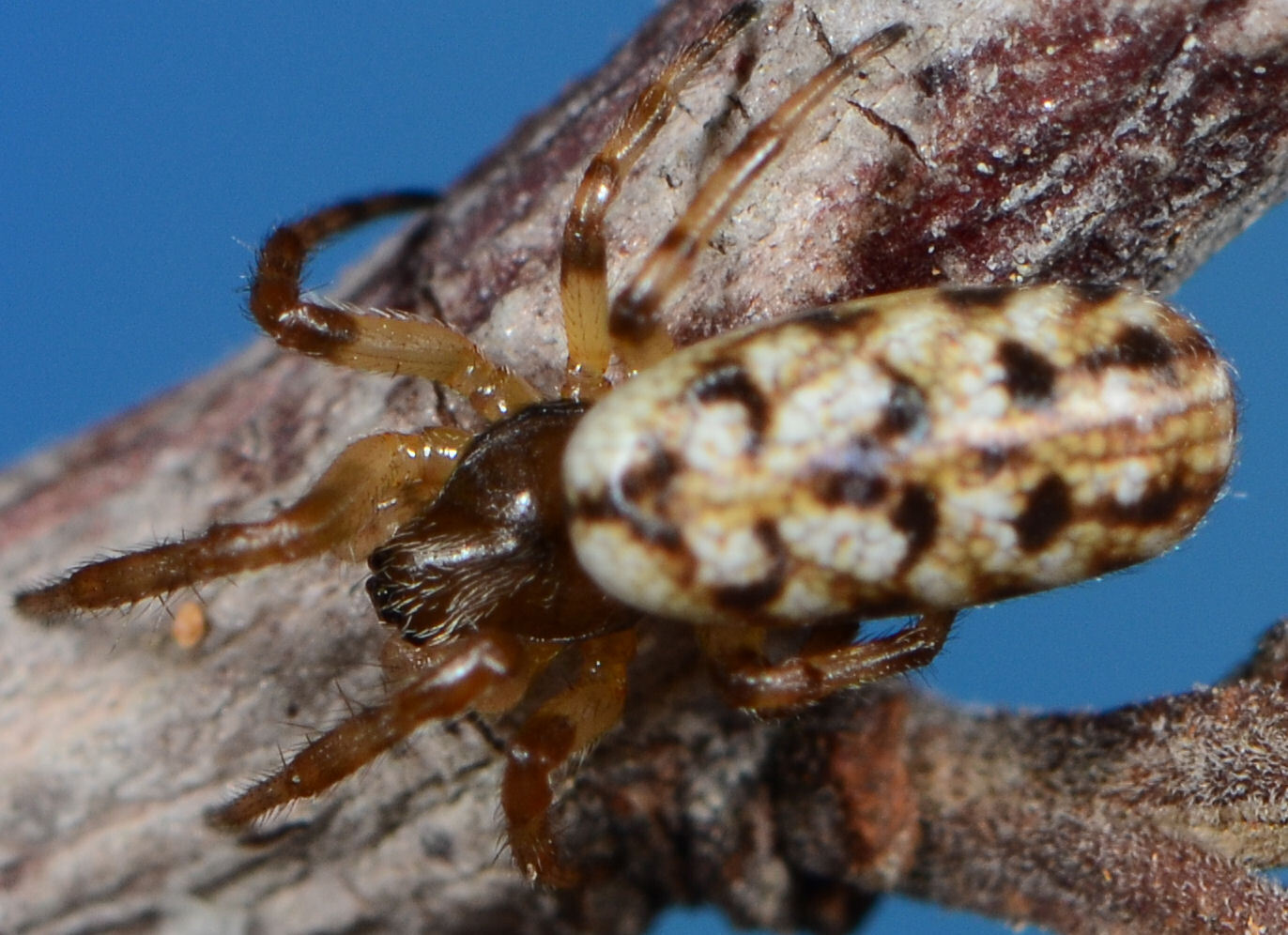
female

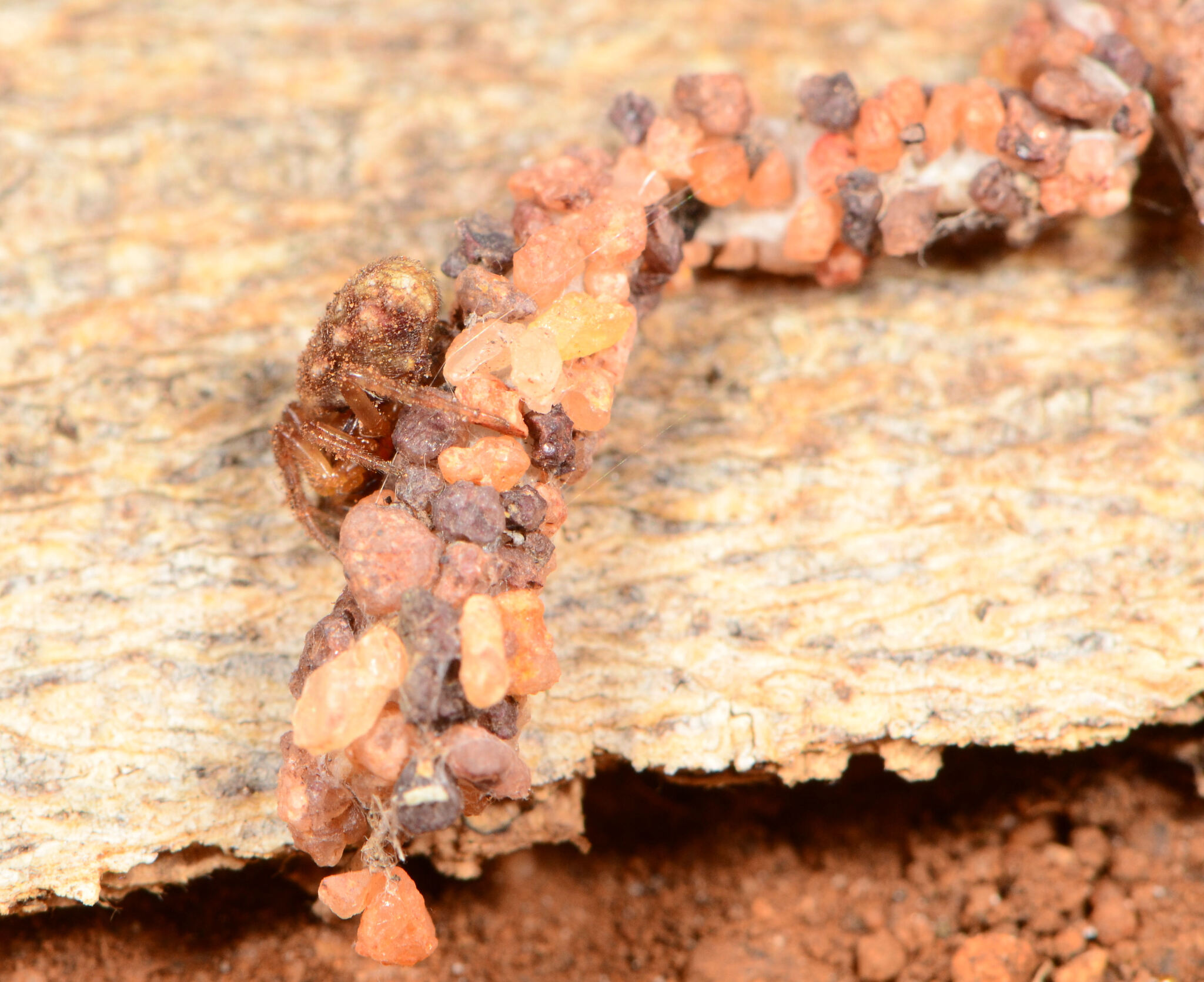
female

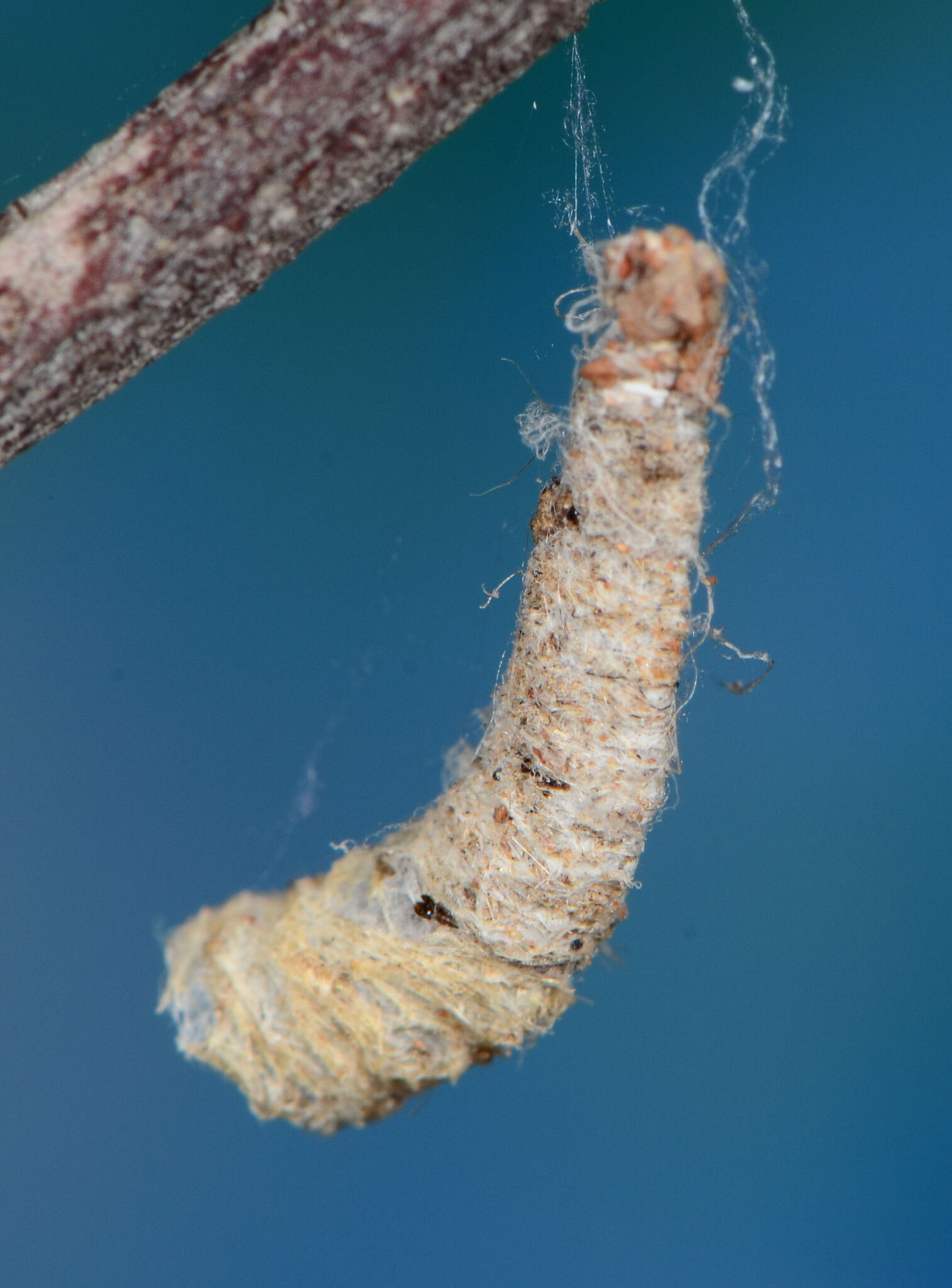
closeup of tube

== Conservation ==
Nemoscolus tubicola is listed as Least Concern by the South African National Biodiversity Institute due to its wide geographical range. There are no known threats to the species. It is protected in 10 protected areas including Bontebok National Park, Mountain Zebra National Park, Roodeplaatdam Nature Reserve, Blouberg Nature Reserve, Richtersveld Transfrontier National Park, and Tswalu Kalahari Reserve.

== Taxonomy ==
The species was originally described as Cyclosa tubicola by Simon in 1887. It has not been revised and is known only from the female.
