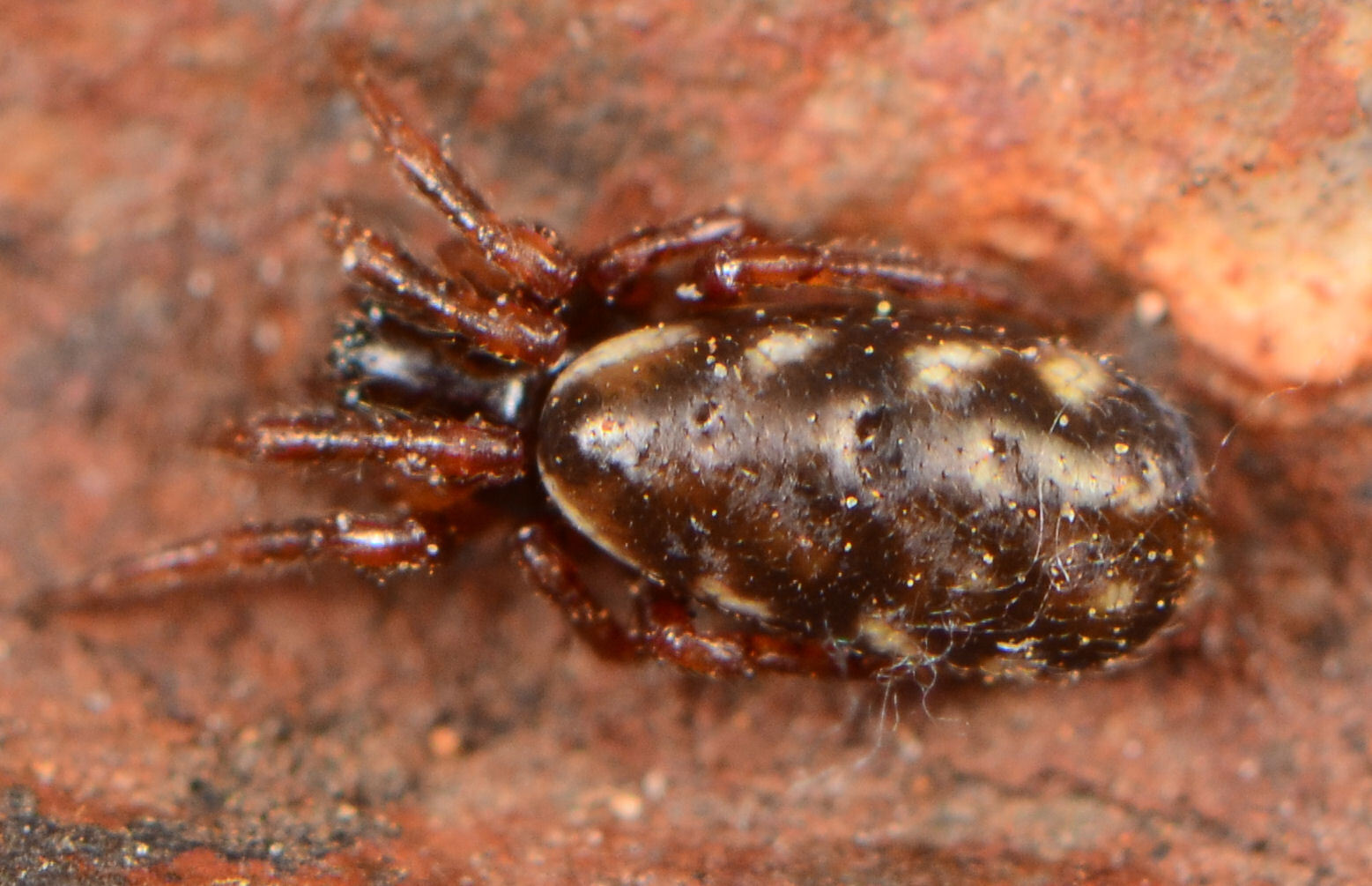
- Female

Scientific classification
- Kingdom: Animalia
- Phylum: Arthropoda
- Subphylum: Chelicerata
- Class: Arachnida
- Order: Araneae
- Infraorder: Araneomorphae
- Family: Araneidae
- Genus: Nemoscolus
- Species: N. obscurus

Binomial name
- Nemoscolus obscurus Simon, 1897

= Nemoscolus obscurus =

Species of spider

Nemoscolus obscurus is a species of spider in the family Araneidae.

== Distribution ==
Nemoscolus obscurus is a South African endemic described from the Transvaal region. The species is known from three localities in Gauteng and North West provinces.

== Habitat and ecology ==
Nemoscolus obscurus is an orb-web spider that makes a stone nest in the centre of the orb-web in grass. The species is known from the Savanna biome.

== Description ==
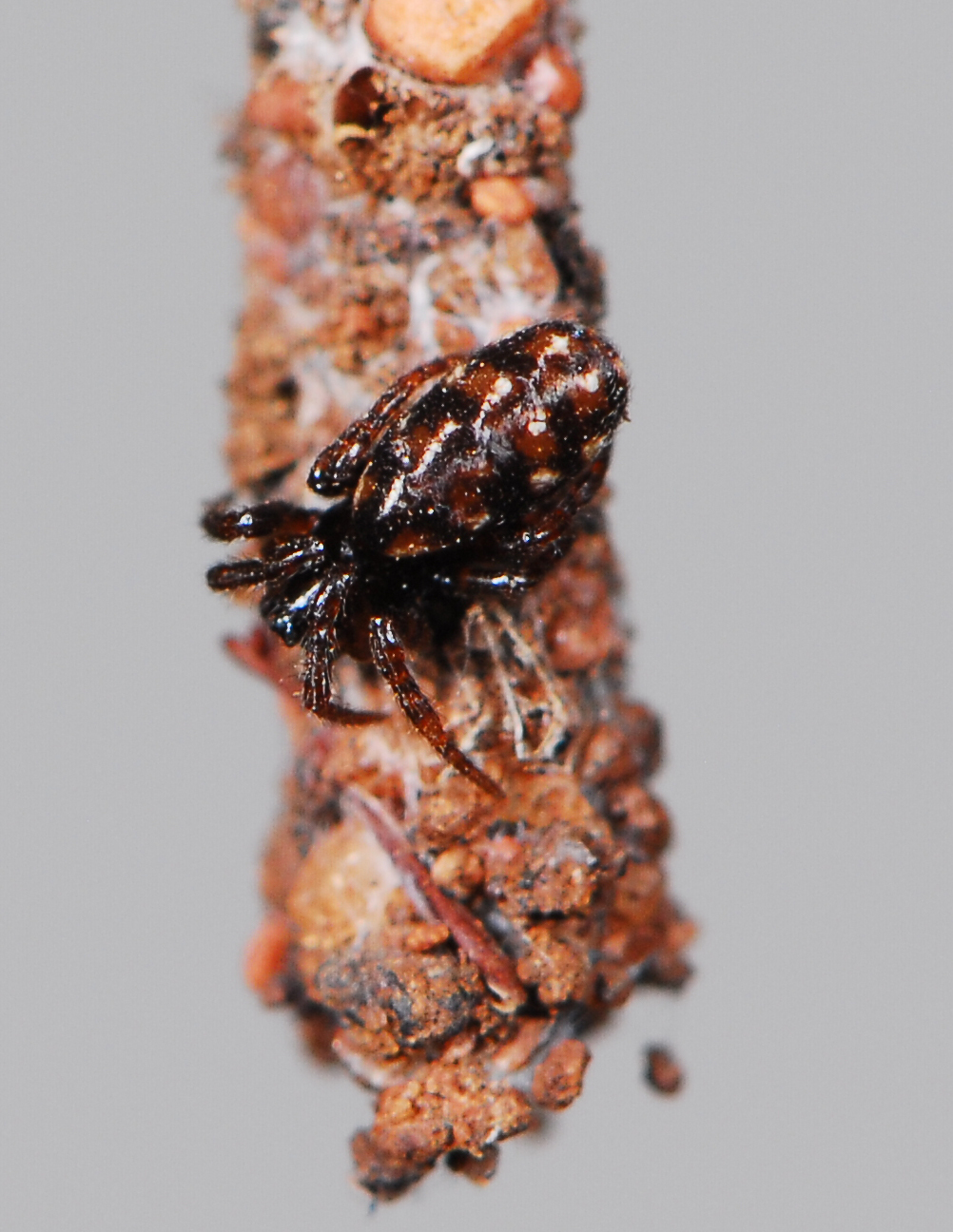
female on stone nest

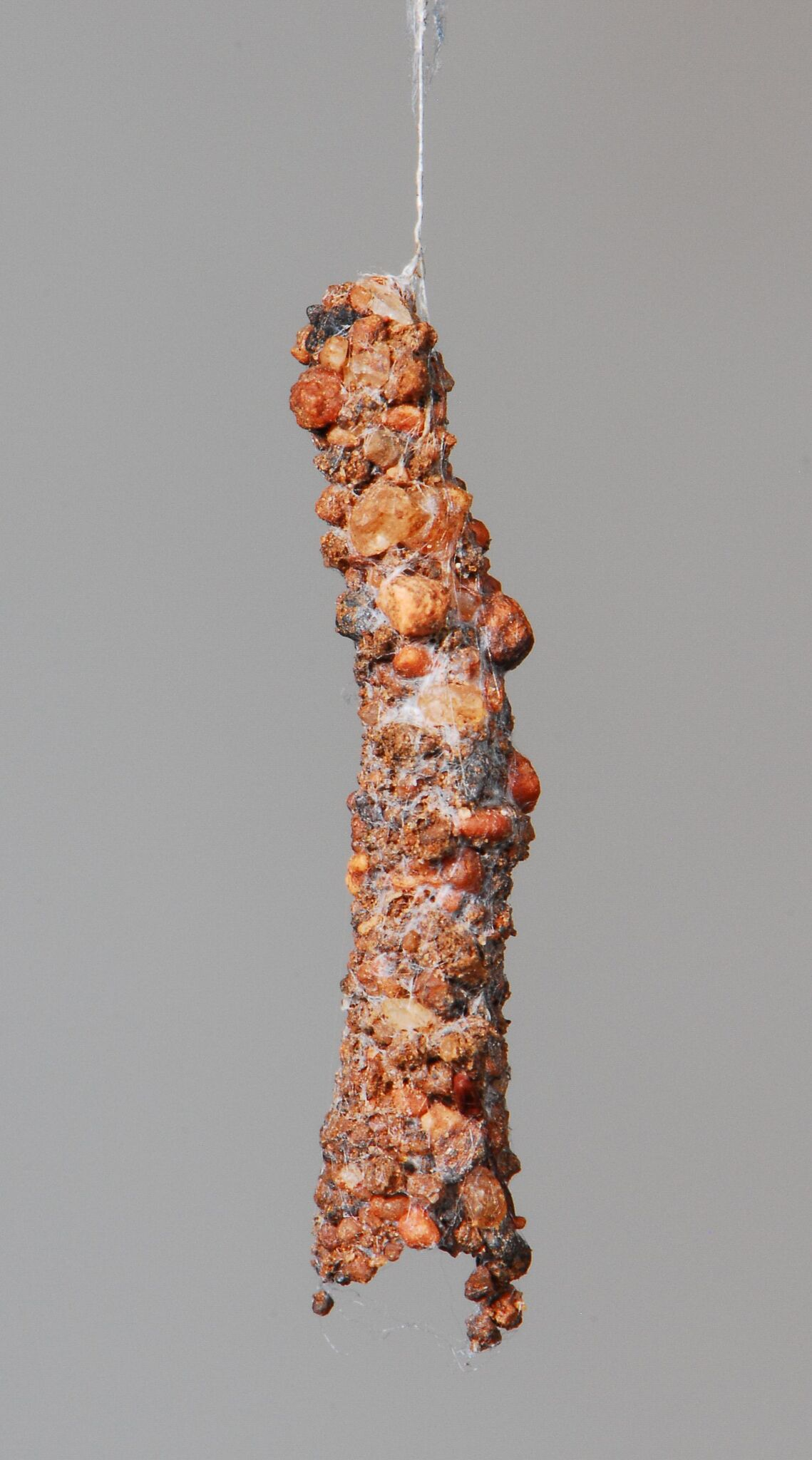

== Conservation ==
Nemoscolus obscurus is listed as Data Deficient for Taxonomic reasons. Too little is known about the location, habitat and threats of this taxon for a full assessment to be made. More sampling is needed to collect the male and determine the species' range. The species is protected in the Pilanesberg Nature Reserve.

== Taxonomy ==
The species has not been revised and is known only from the female.
