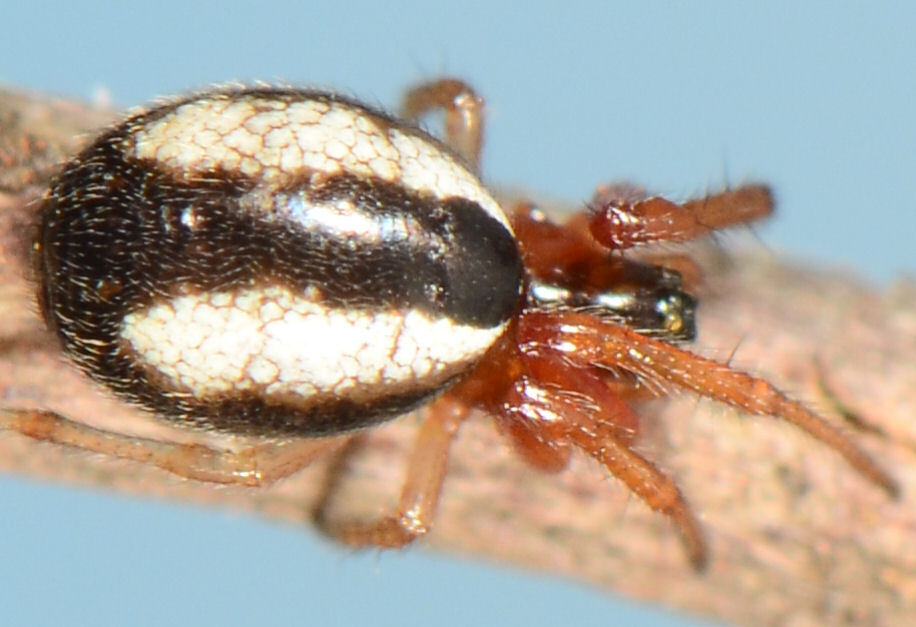
- Female
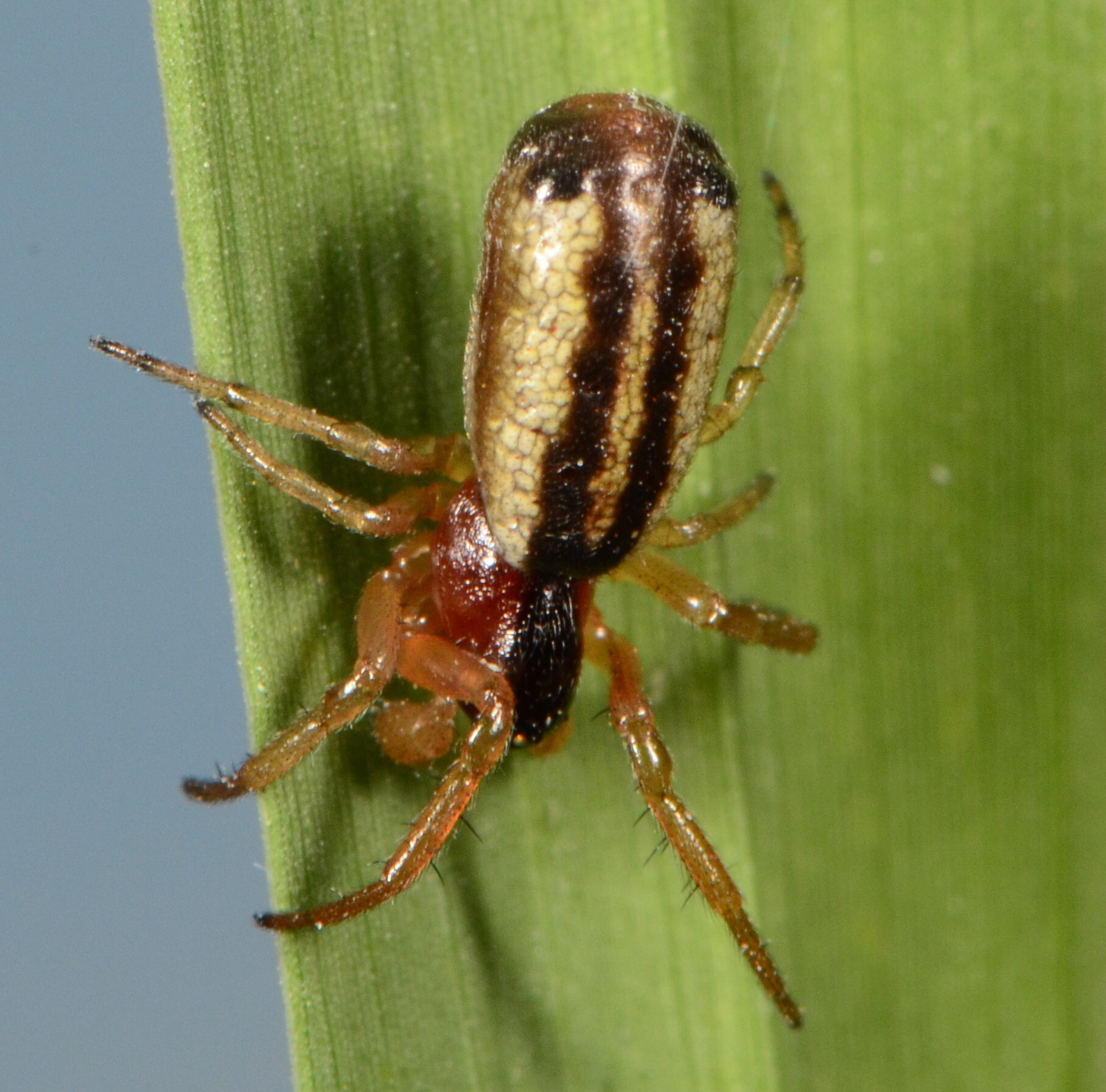
- Juvenile male

Scientific classification
- Kingdom: Animalia
- Phylum: Arthropoda
- Subphylum: Chelicerata
- Class: Arachnida
- Order: Araneae
- Infraorder: Araneomorphae
- Family: Araneidae
- Genus: Nemoscolus
- Species: N. cotti

Binomial name
- Nemoscolus cotti Lessert, 1933

= Nemoscolus cotti =

Cott's Stone-Nest Spider

Species of spider

Nemoscolus cotti is a species of spider in the family Araneidae. It is commonly known as Cott's stone-nest spider.

== Distribution ==
Nemoscolus cotti is a Southern African endemic with a wide distribution across Zimbabwe, Mozambique and South Africa.

In South Africa, the species occurs in seven provinces, Eastern Cape, Free State, Gauteng, KwaZulu-Natal, Limpopo, Mpumalanga, and Northern Cape.The species has a large geographical range, occurring at altitudes ranging from 93 to 1,838 m above sea level.

== Habitat and ecology ==
Nemoscolus cotti is an orb-web spider that makes a stone nest in the centre of the orb-web, usually in grass.

The species is known from the Savanna, Nama Karoo and Grassland biomes.

== Description ==
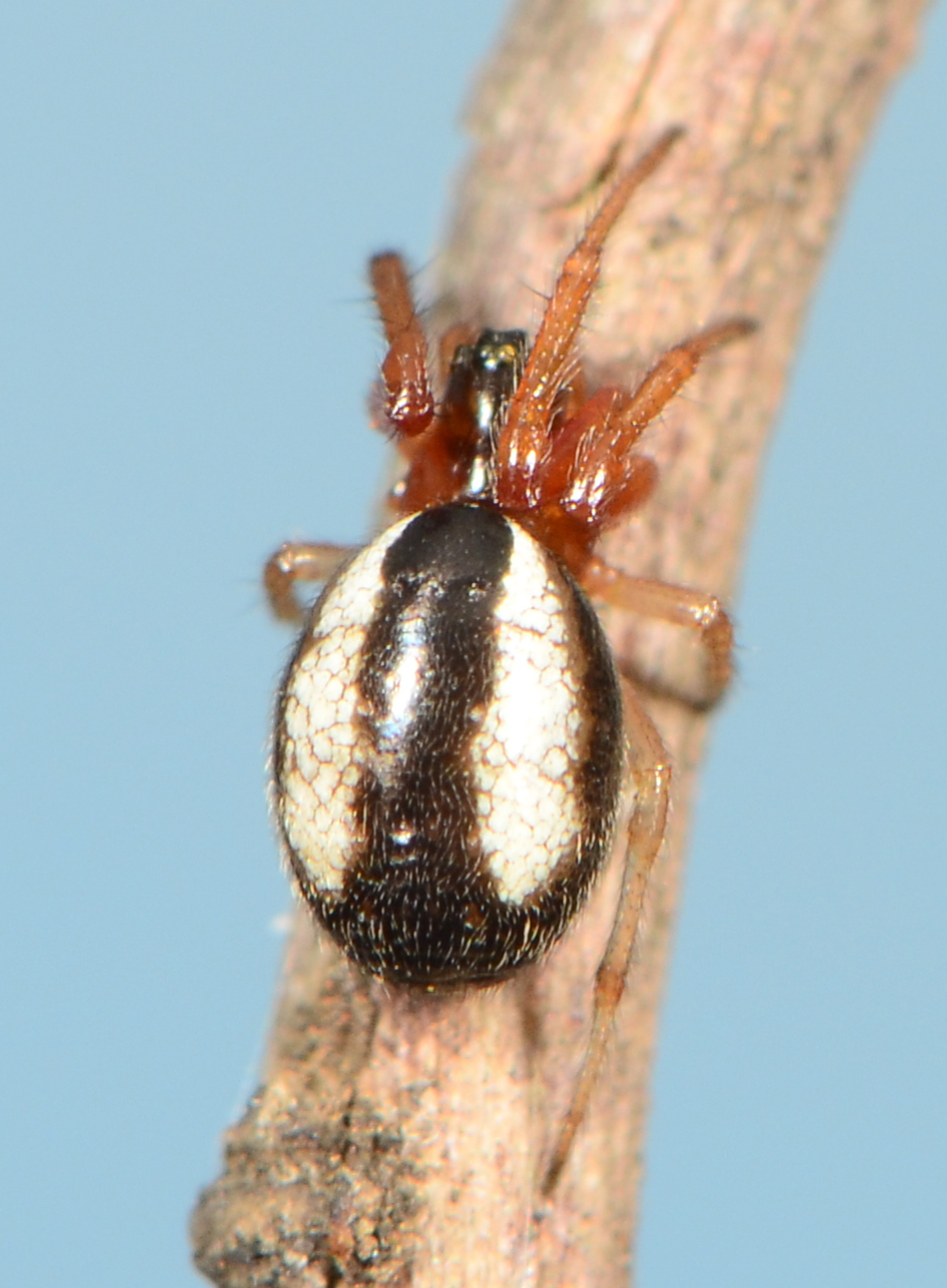
female

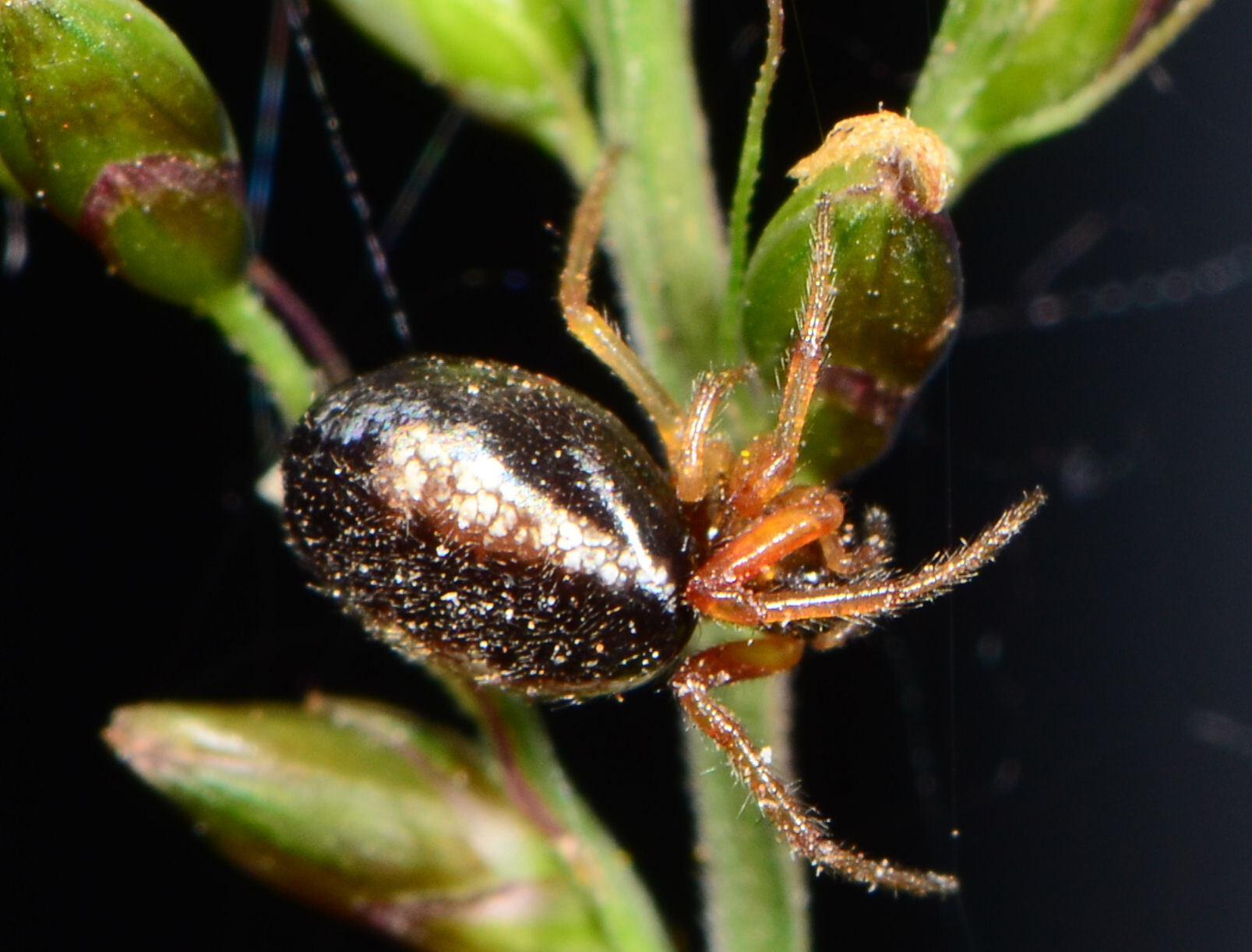
female

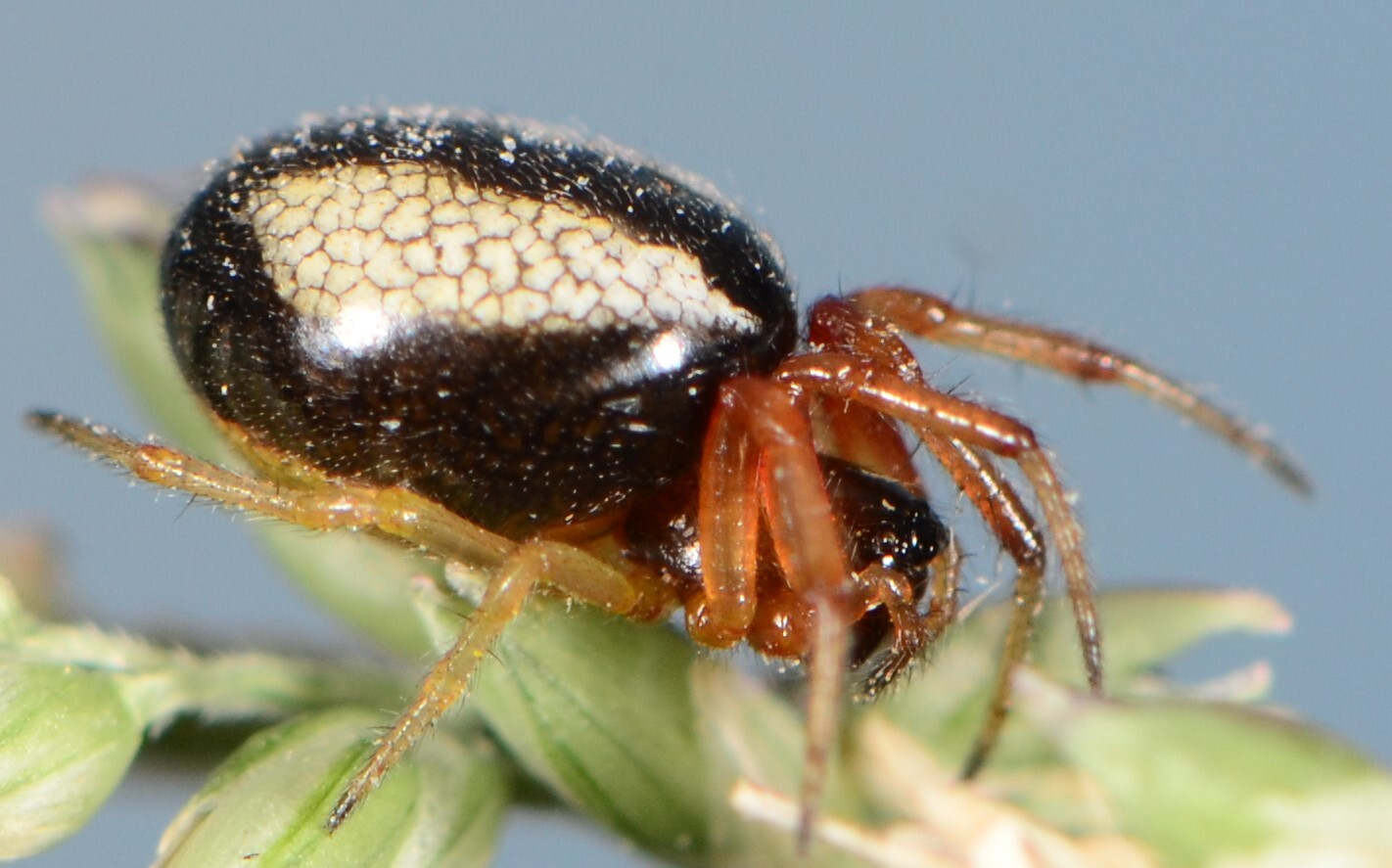
female

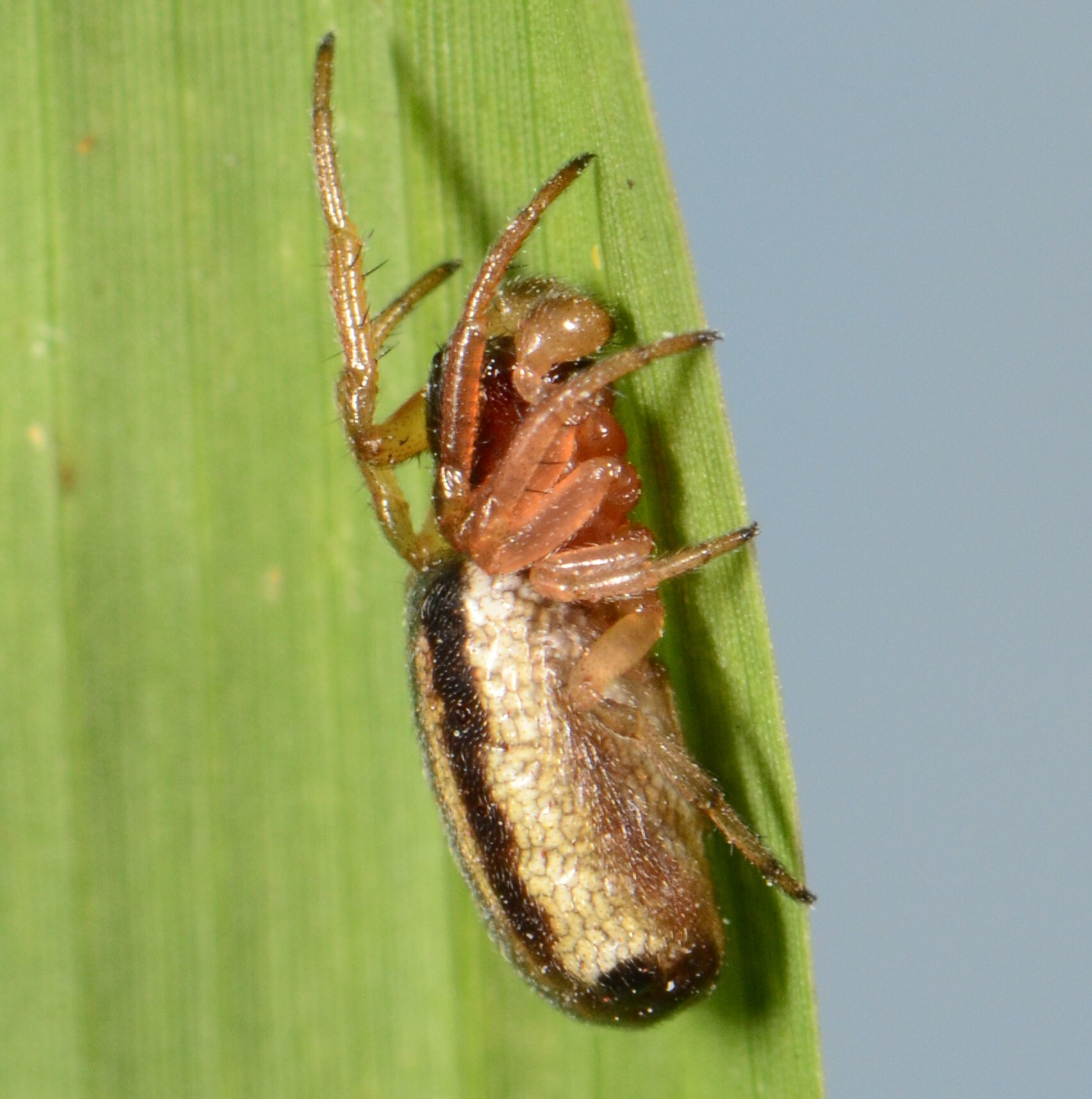
juvenile male

== Conservation ==
Nemoscolus cotti is listed as Least Concern by the South African National Biodiversity Institute due to its wide geographical range. There are no known threats to the species. It is protected in six protected areas including Erfenis Dam Nature Reserve, Kruger National Park, Blouberg Nature Reserve and Marakele National Park.

== Taxonomy ==
Nemoscolus cotti has not been revised and is known only from the male. The female has been collected but remains undescribed.
