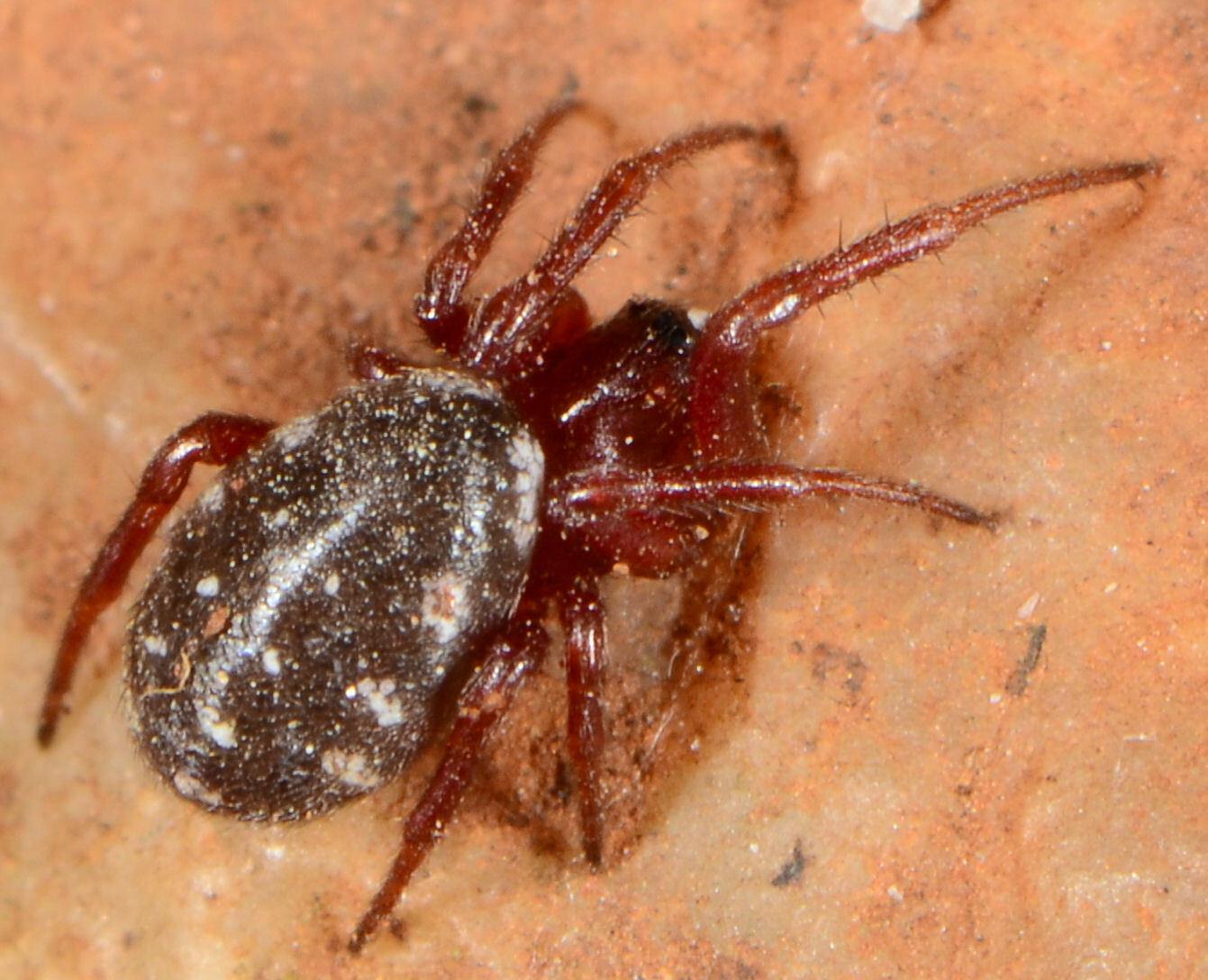
- Female N. vigintipunctatus
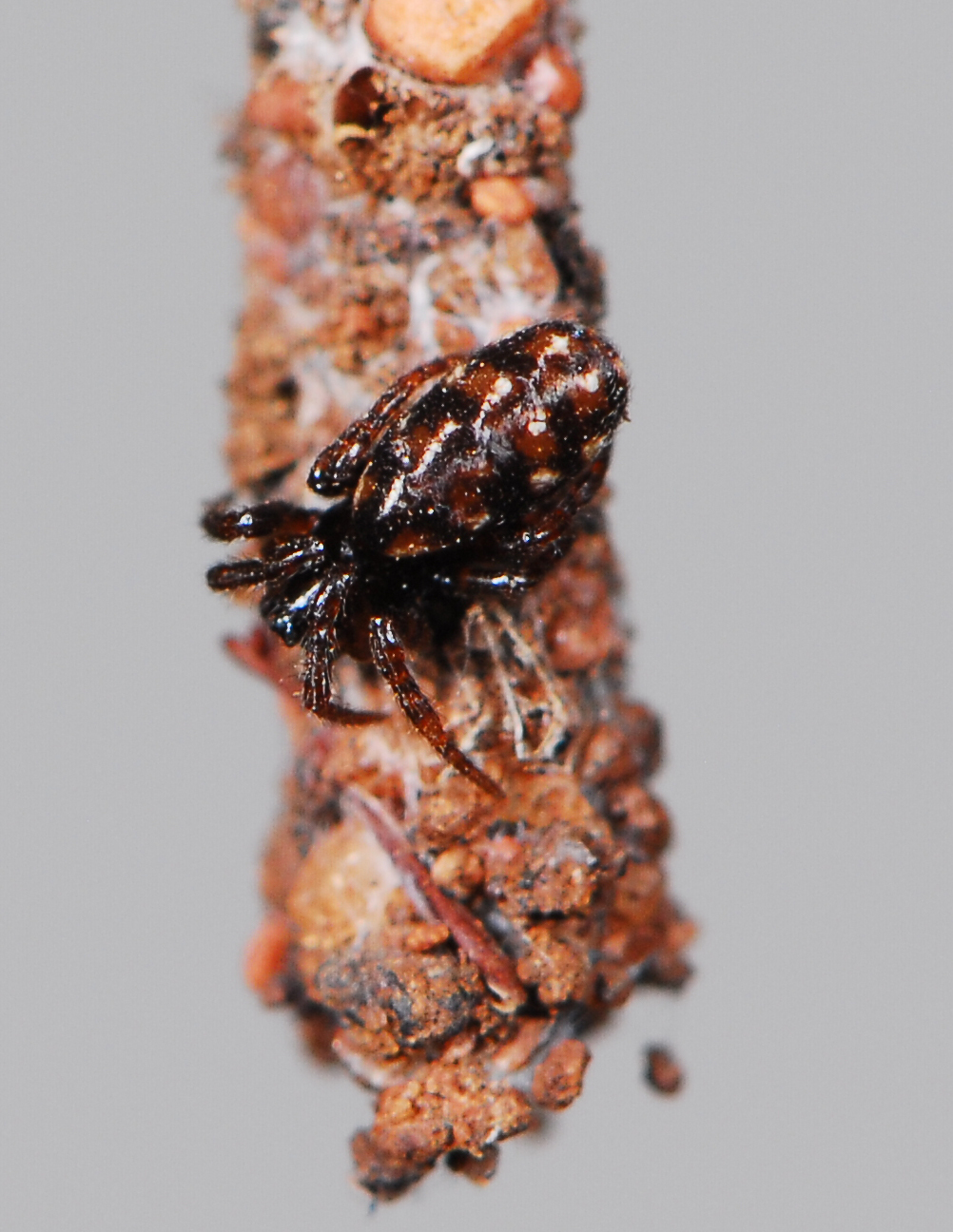
- Female N. obscurus on stone nest

Scientific classification
- Kingdom: Animalia
- Phylum: Arthropoda
- Subphylum: Chelicerata
- Class: Arachnida
- Order: Araneae
- Infraorder: Araneomorphae
- Family: Araneidae
- Genus: Nemoscolus; Simon, 1895

Type species
- N. laurae (Simon, 1868)

Species
- 15, see text

= Nemoscolus =

Genus of spiders

Nemoscolus is a genus of orb-weaver spiders first described by Eugène Simon in 1895.

== Life style ==
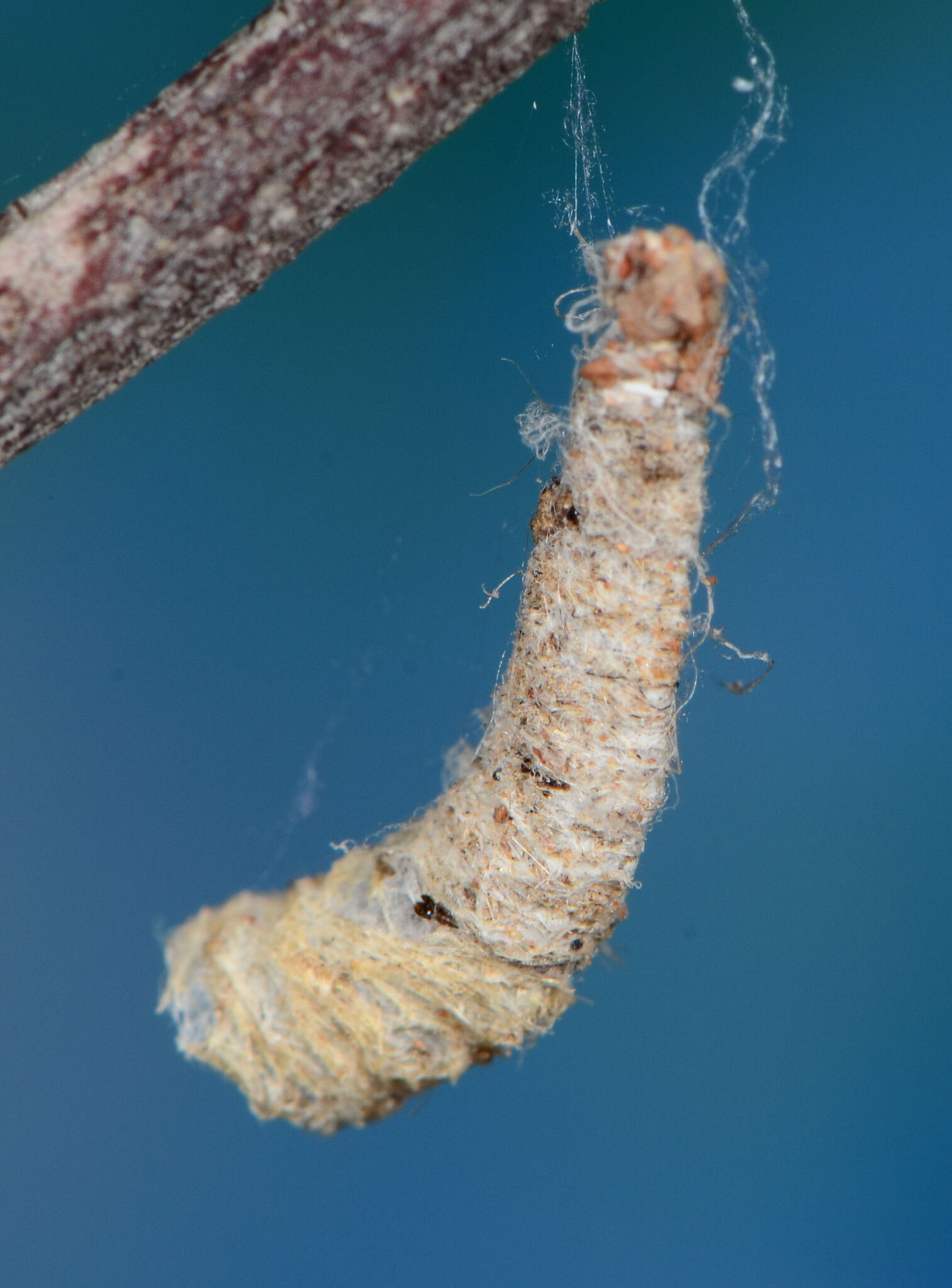
stone nest of N. tubicola

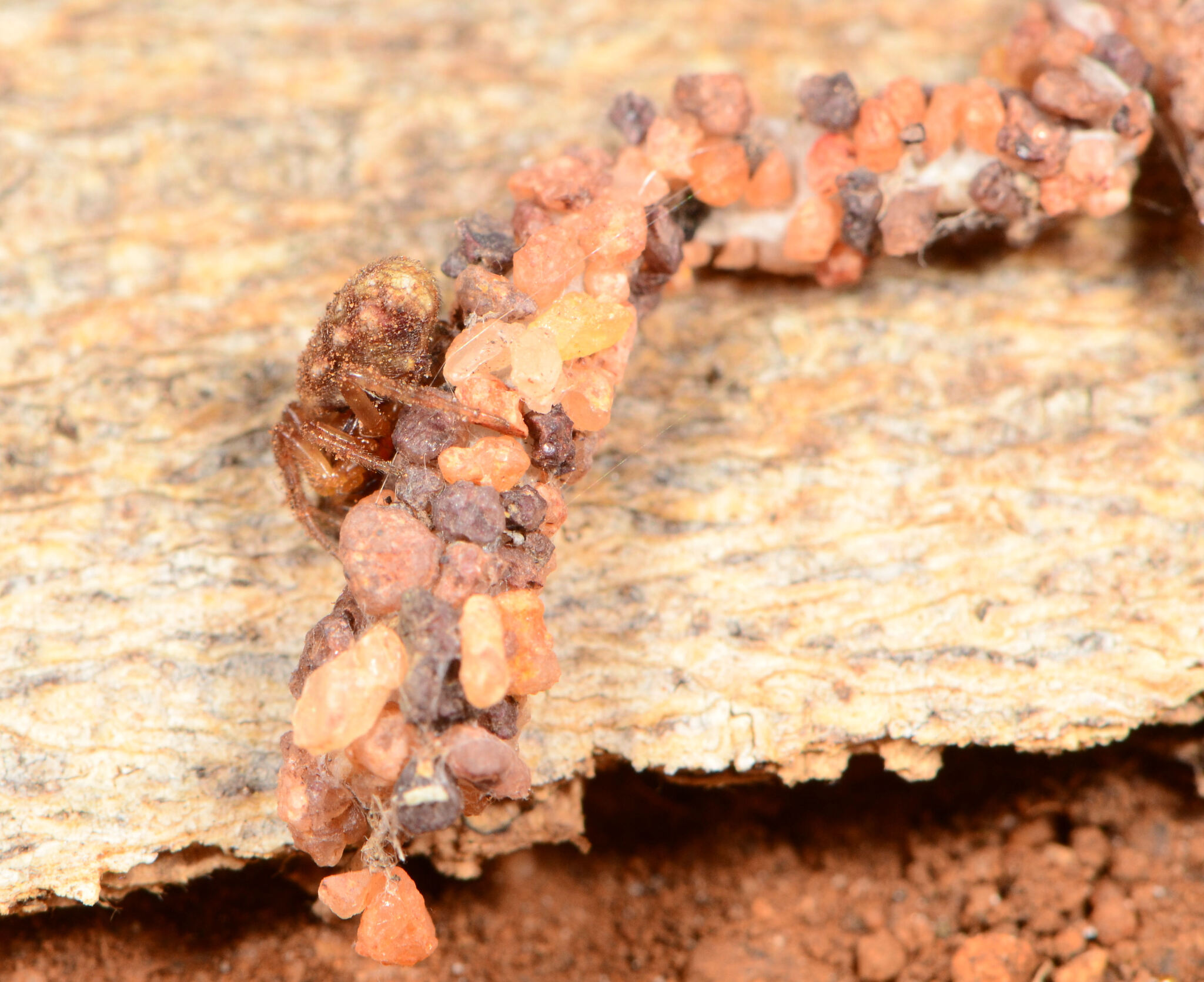
female N. tubicola on nest

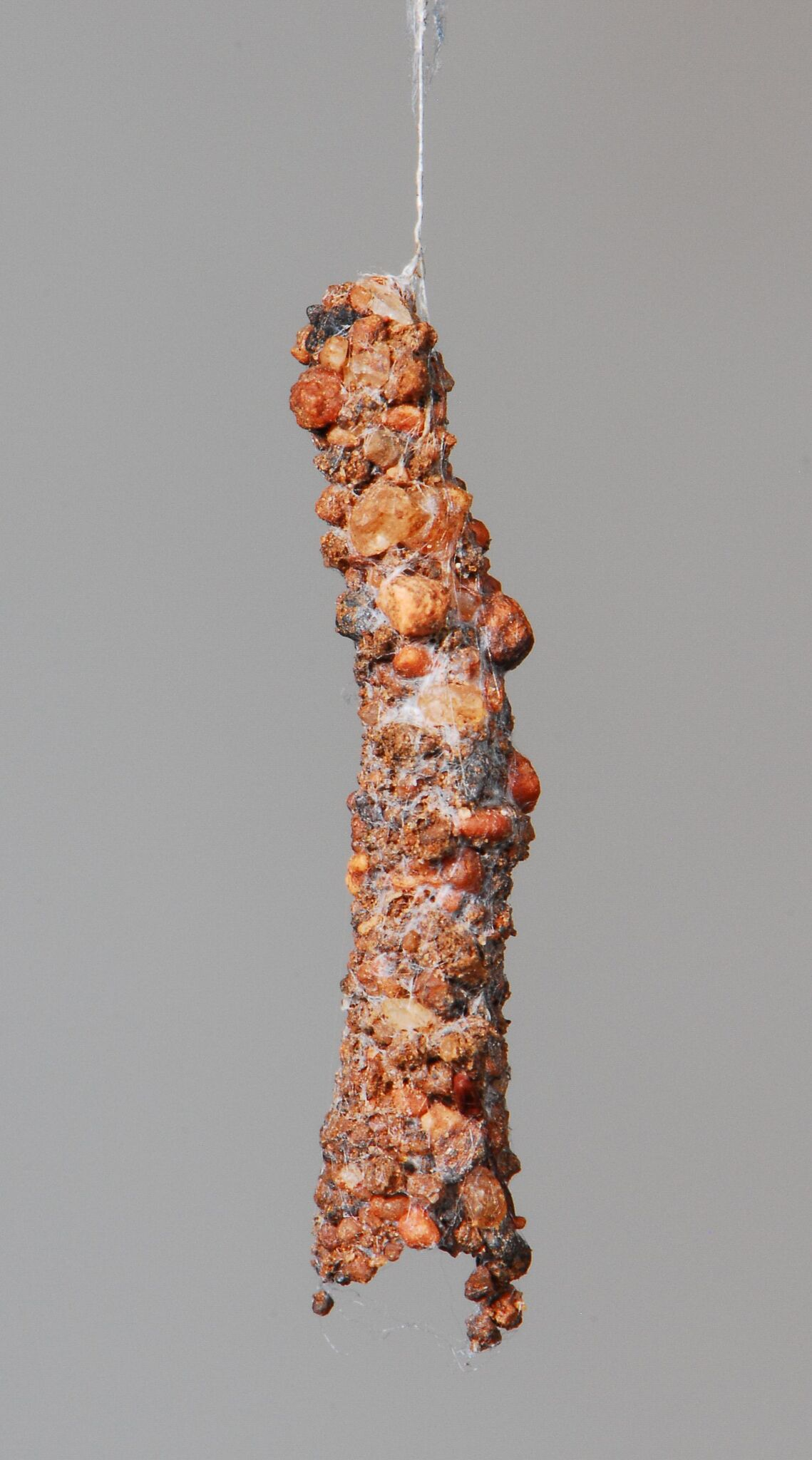
stone nest of N. obscurus

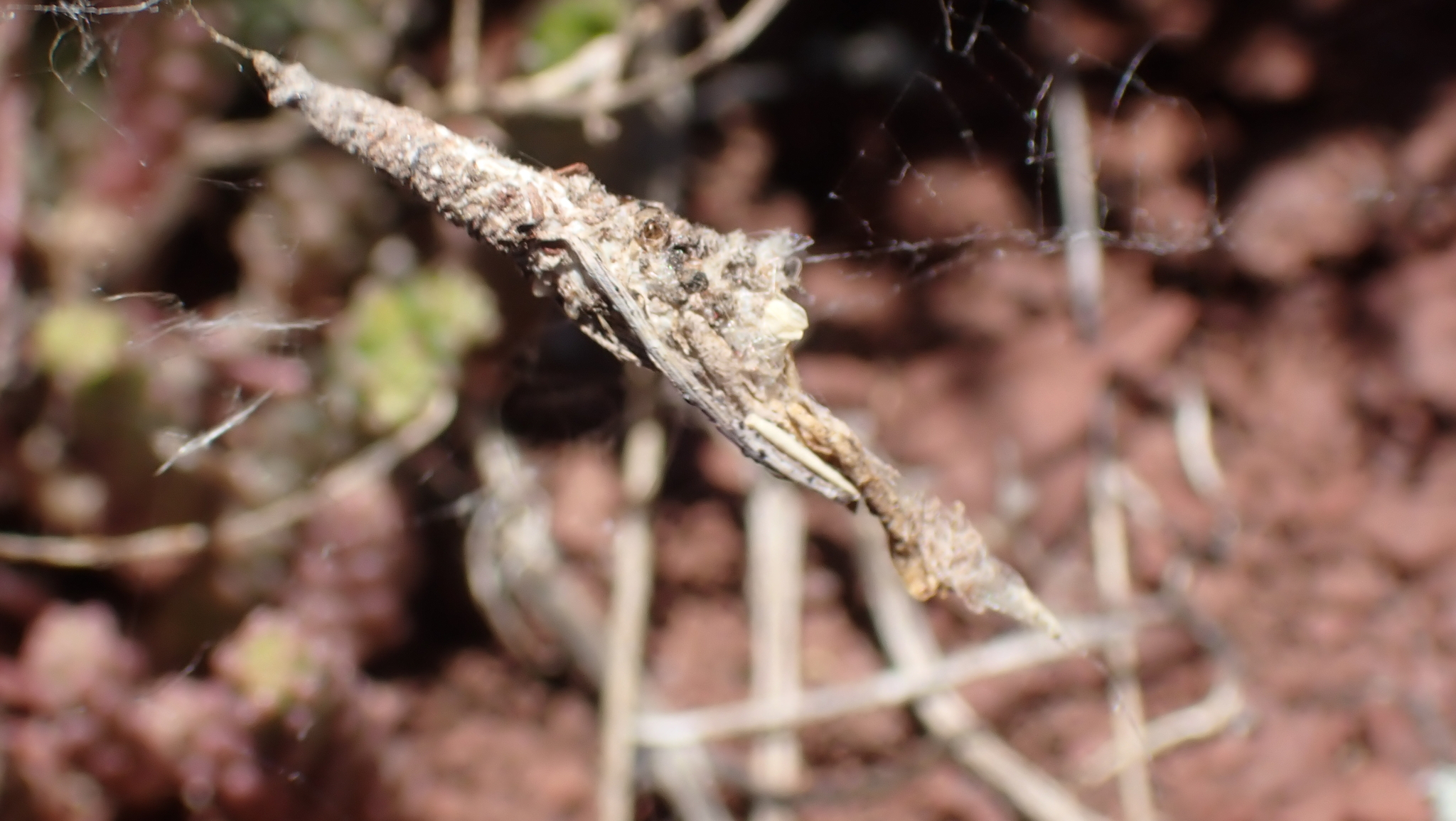
nest of N. laurae

Nemoscolus species are orb-web spiders that make a stone nest in the centre of the orb-web. The webs are usually constructed in grass and lack a stabilimentum.

A small conical or helicoid retreat is made of material such as soil particles, silk and vegetable matter. The opening of the tube is positioned in the centre of the horizontal orb-web, and the conical tube serves as both a retreat and a repository for eggs. The spider sits in the entrance of the web waiting for prey.

Prey typically consists of jumping insects such as second-instar locusts.

== Description ==
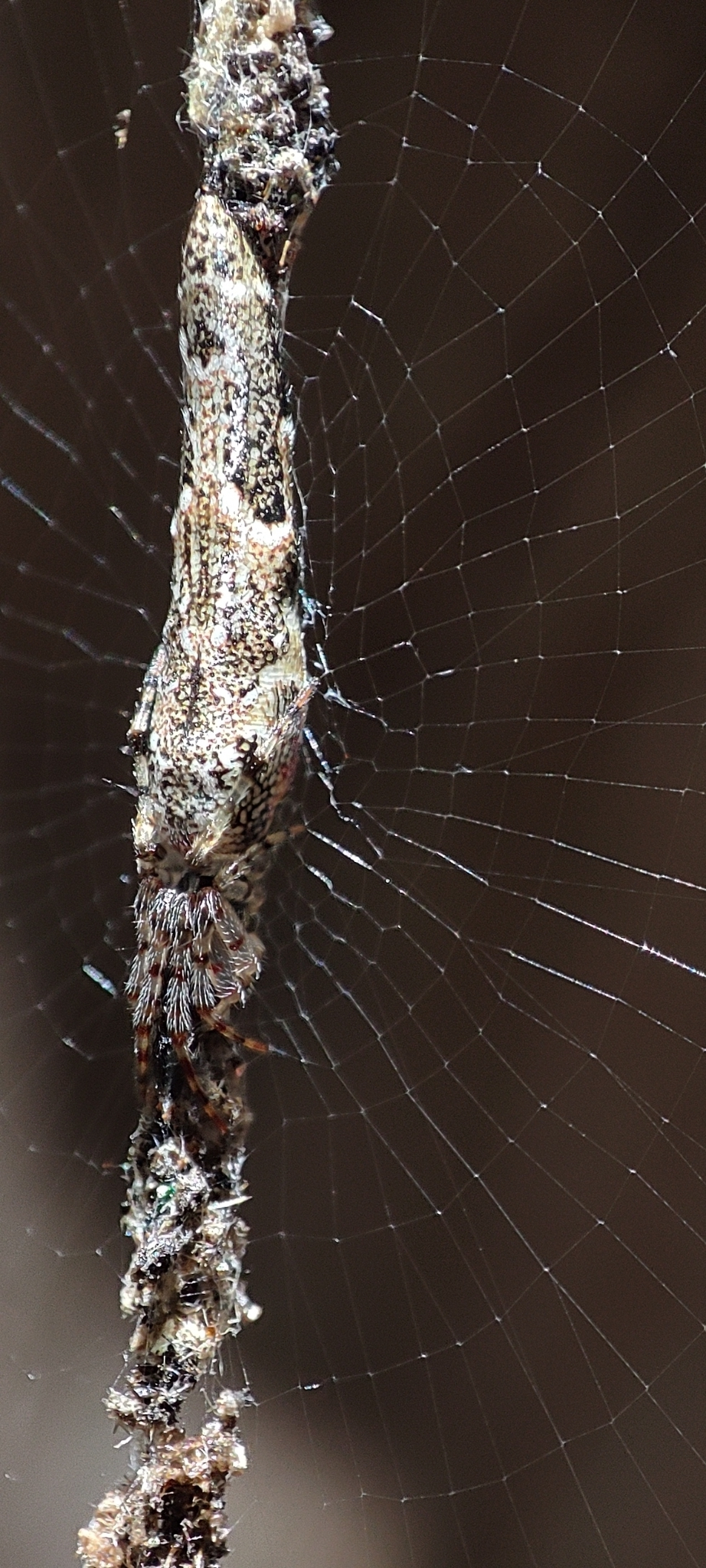
N. elongatus

Female spiders measure 4-6 mm in total length, while males are slightly smaller at 3-5 mm. These small spiders have slightly elongated bodies with a pear-shaped carapace that is narrower in the eye region.

The abdomen is round oval and is usually whitish with median and lateral longitudinal bands that merge posteriorly.

The legs are similar in colour to the carapace and are kept tightly against the body. Males are a little smaller than females.

== Species ==
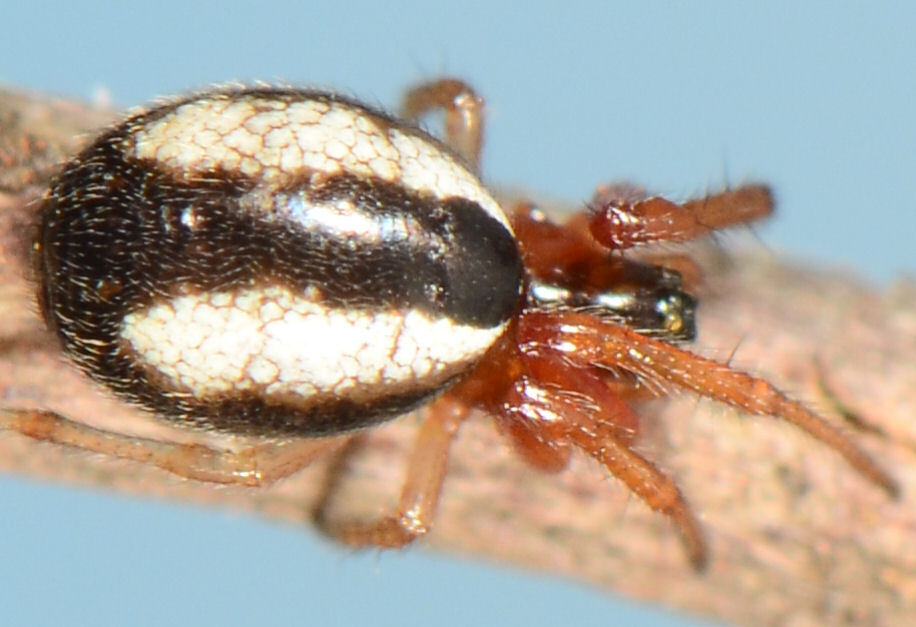
female N. cotti

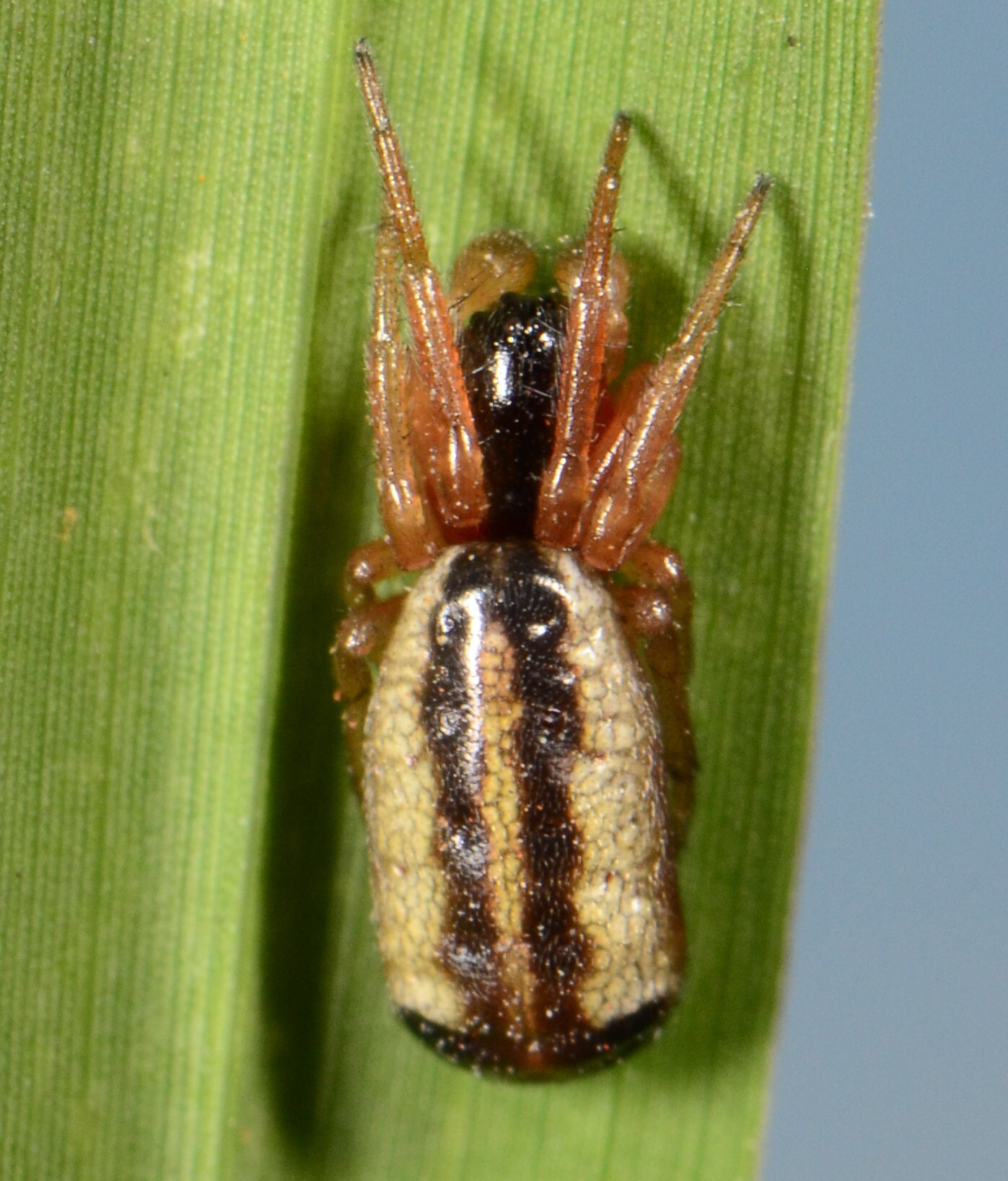
juvenile male N. cotti

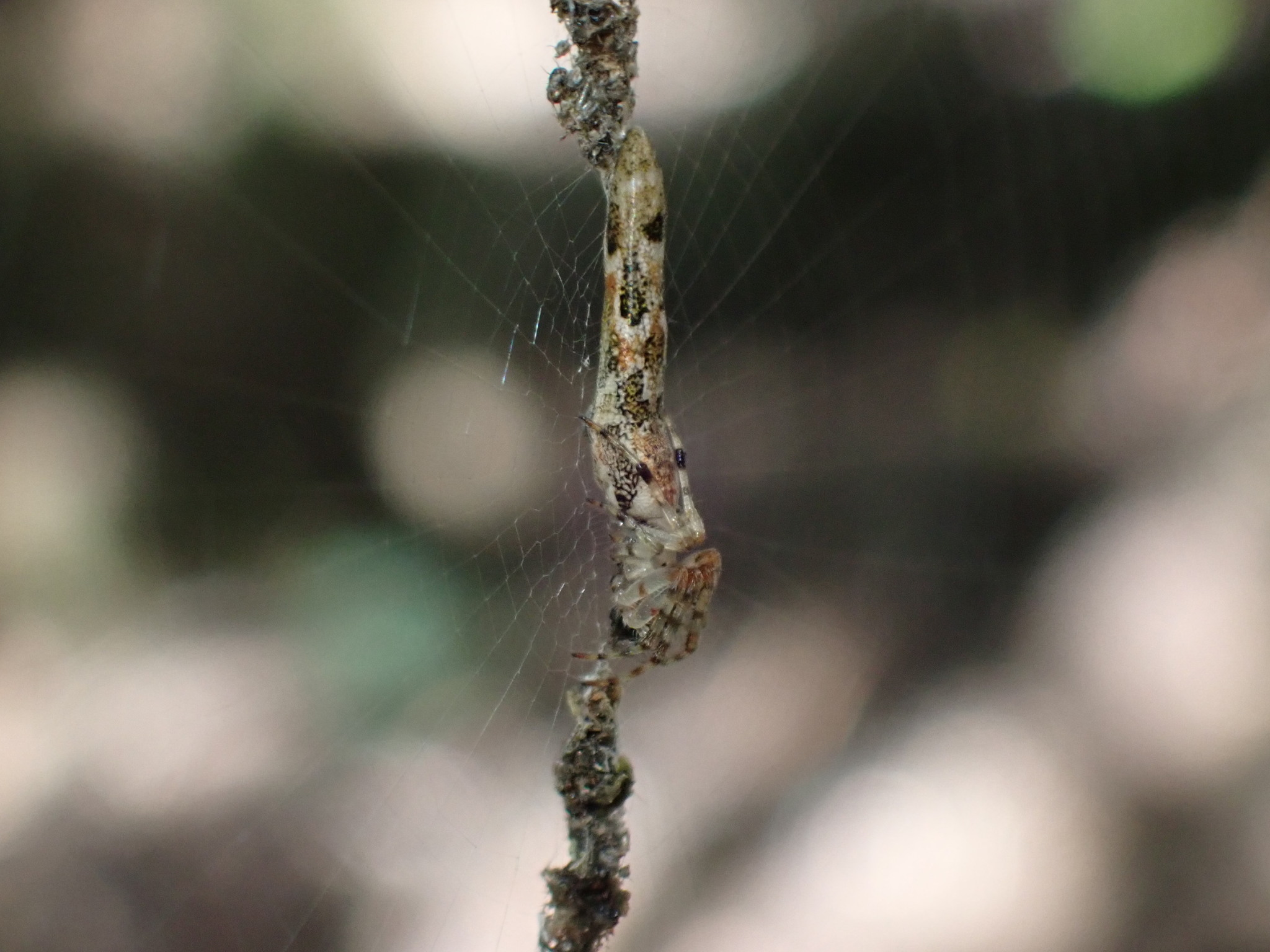
N. elongatus

As of November 2026, this genus includes fifteen species, all found in Africa except for N. laurae, found in the western Mediterranean, and N. sandersi, found in Australia:

- Nemoscolus affinis Lessert, 1933 – DR Congo
- Nemoscolus cotti Lessert, 1933 – Zimbabwe, Mozambique, South Africa
- Nemoscolus elongatus Lawrence, 1947 – South Africa
- Nemoscolus kolosvaryi Caporiacco, 1947 – Uganda
- Nemoscolus lateplagiatis Simon, 1907 – Guinea-Bissau
- Nemoscolus laurae (Simon, 1868) – Western Mediterranean (type species)
- Nemoscolus niger Caporiacco, 1936 – Libya
- Nemoscolus obscurus Simon, 1897 – South Africa
- Nemoscolus rectifrons Roewer, 1961 – Senegal
- Nemoscolus sandersi Kallal & Hormiga, 2020 – Australia (Queensland)
- Nemoscolus semilugens Denis, 1966 – Libya
- Nemoscolus tubicola (Simon, 1887) – Namibia, South Africa, Eswatini
- Nemoscolus turricola Berland, 1933 – Mali
- Nemoscolus vigintipunctatus Simon, 1897 – Zimbabwe, South Africa
- Nemoscolus waterloti Berland, 1920 – Madagascar
