= List of Trochanteriidae species =

This page lists all described species of the spider family Trochanteriidae accepted by the World Spider Catalog as of January 2023:

== D ==
=== Doliomalus ===
Doliomalus Simon, 1897

- D. cimicoides (Nicolet, 1849) (type) — Chile

== H ==
=== Hemicloea ===
Hemicloea

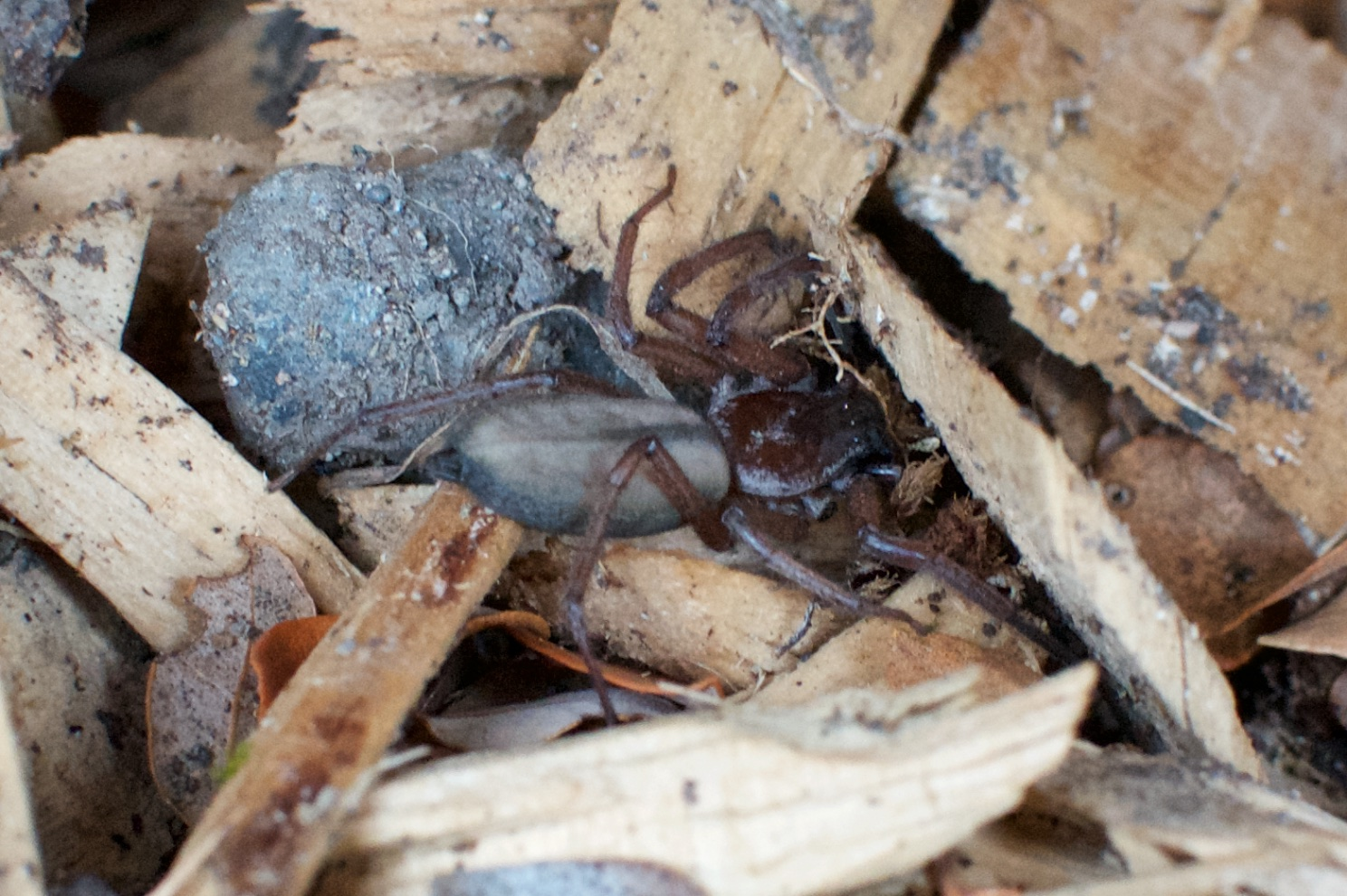
Flattened bark spider
(Hemicloea rogenhoferi)

Hemicloea Thorell, 1870

- H. affinis L. Koch, 1875 — Australia (New South Wales)
- H. crocotila Simon, 1908 — Australia (Western Australia)
- H. limbata L. Koch, 1875 — Australia (New South Wales)
- H. michaelseni Simon, 1908 — Australia (Western Australia)
- H. murina L. Koch, 1875 — Australia (Queensland)
- H. pacifica Berland, 1924 — New Caledonia (Loyalty Is.)
- H. plumea L. Koch, 1875 — Australia (Queensland, New South Wales, Lord Howe Is.)
- H. rogenhoferi L. Koch, 1875 — Australia (Queensland, New South Wales). Introduced to New Zealand
- H. semiplumosa Simon, 1908 — Australia (Western Australia)
- H. sublimbata Simon, 1908 — Australia (Western Australia)
- H. sundevalli Thorell, 1870 (type) — Australia (Queensland, New South Wales), New Zealand
- H. tasmani Dalmas, 1917 — Australia (Tasmania)
- H. tenera L. Koch, 1876 — Australia (Queensland, New South Wales)

== P ==
=== Plator ===
Plator Simon, 1880

- P. bowo Zhu, Tang, Zhang & Song, 2006 — China
- P. cyclicus Lin & Li, 2020 — China
- P. dazhonghua Lin & Li, 2020 — China
- P. hanyikani Lin & Li, 2020 — China
- P. himalayaensis Tikader & Gajbe, 1976 — India
- P. indicus Simon, 1897 — India
- P. insolens Simon, 1880 (type) — China
- P. kamurai Lin & Li, 2020 — China
- P. kashmirensis Tikader & Gajbe, 1973 — India
- P. nipponicus (Kishida, 1914) — China, Korea, Japan
- P. pandeae Tikader, 1969 — India, China
- P. pennatus Platnick, 1976 — China
- P. qiului Lin & Li, 2020 — China
- P. serratus Lin & Zhu, 2016 — China
- P. solanensis Tikader & Gajbe, 1976 — India
- P. yunlong Zhu, Tang, Zhang & Song, 2006 — China

=== Platyoides ===
Platyoides O. Pickard-Cambridge, 1891

- P. alpha Lawrence, 1928 — Angola, Namibia, South Africa
- P. costeri Tucker, 1923 — South Africa
- P. fitzsimonsi Lawrence, 1938 — Namibia
- P. grandidieri Simon, 1903 — Kenya, Madagascar, Seychelles (Aldabra), Réunion
- P. leppanae Pocock, 1902 — Mozambique, South Africa
- P. mailaka Platnick, 1985 — Madagascar
- P. pictus Pocock, 1902 — South Africa
- P. pirie Platnick, 1985 — South Africa
- P. pusillus Pocock, 1898 — Tanzania, Zimbabwe, South Africa
- P. quinquedentatus Purcell, 1907 — South Africa
- P. ravina Andriamalala & Ubick, 2007 — Madagascar
- P. rossi Platnick, 1985 — South Africa
- P. vao Andriamalala & Ubick, 2007 — Madagascar
- P. velonus Platnick, 1985 — Madagascar
- P. venturus Platnick, 1985 — Canary Is.
- P. walteri (Karsch, 1887) (type) — East, Southern Africa

== T ==
=== † Thereola ===
† Thereola Petrunkevitch, 1955

- † T. petiolata Koch and Berendt, 1854
- † T. pubescens Menge, 1854

=== Trochanteria ===
Trochanteria Karsch, 1878

- T. gomezi Canals, 1933 — Argentina, Paraguay, Brazil
- T. ranuncula Karsch, 1878 (type) — Brazil
- T. rugosa Mello-Leitão, 1938 — Argentina

== V ==
=== Vectius ===
Vectius Simon, 1897

- V. niger (Simon, 1880) (type) — Brazil, Paraguay, Argentina

=== † Veterator ===
† Veterator Petrunkevitch, 1963 - Trochanteriinae

- † V. angustus Wunderlich, 1988
- † V. ascutum Wunderlich, 1988
- † V. extinctus Petrunkevitch, 1963
- † V. incompletus Wunderlich, 1982
- † V. longipes Wunderlich, 1988
- † V. loricatus Wunderlich, 1988
- † V. porrectus Wunderlich, 1988
- † V. viduus Wunderlich, 1988
