= Katlego =

Katlego (also spelled Katleho in Northern Sotho) is a unisex given name of Sotho-Tswana origin meaning success or prosperity. Notable people with the name include:

- Katlego Danke (born 1978), South African actress
- Katlego Kai Kolanyane-Kesupile (born 1988), Botswana artist and LGBT activist
- Katlego Maboe (born 1986), South African television presenter
- Katlego Maphathe (born 1993), South African footballer
- Katlego Mashego (born 1982), South African footballer
- Katlego Mashigo (born 2001), South African footballer
- Katlego Mohamme (born 1998), South African footballer
- Katlego Mphela (born 1984), South African footballer
- Katlego Ncala, South African television personality
- Katlego Otladisa (born 1996), South African footballer
- Katlego Phala (born c. 1992), South African politician
- Katlego Pule (born 1990), South African footballer
- Katlego Thena (born 1998), South African cricketer
- Katleho Leokaoke (born 1996), South African cricketer
- Katleho Makateng (born 1998), Mosotho footballer
- Katleho Malebane (born 2009), South African soccer player
- Katleho Moleko (born 1986), Mosotho footballer
- Katleho Ramaphakela, South African filmmaker
