= Scorpion spider =

Scorpion spider may refer to:

- Platyoides and other genera of family Trochanteriidae
- Arachnura in the family Araneidae

Note: The latter group is also named Scorpion-tailed Spiders, to distinguish them from the first group which is tailless.
