= Miss Teenager South Africa =

Beauty pageant

Miss Teenager South Africa also known as MTSA is a beauty pageant in South Africa that was formed in 1993 for female models aged between 14 years and 19 years.

The current Miss Teenager South Africa is Iminathi Dondolo who was crowned in 2023. The pageant winner becomes an ambassador for teenagers across South Africa. Entry into the pageant is through applications on the Miss Teenager South Africa website.

== Titleholders ==
This is a list of women who have won the Miss Teenager South Africa beauty pageant.

Year	Miss Teenager South Africa	Province Represented
2024	Pearl Mathebula	Limpopo
2022/23	Iminathi Dondolo	Cape town
2021/22	Khanyisile Mahlangu	Gauteng
2020/21	Kayleigh Jephta	Cape Town
2019/20	Tanielle Da Silva	Gauteng
2018/19	Katlego Ncala	Gauteng
