= Nthabeleng Likotsi =

- Born: 11 August 1984; 42 years ago Botshabelo, Free State Province, South Africa
- Citizenship: South African
- Education: University of the Witwatersrand (Masters Degree in Entrepreneurship) (Certificate in Entrepreneurship); University of Johannesburg (Postgraduate Certificate in Accounting)
- Occupations: Accountant, Entrepreneur, Business Executive
- Years active: 2009 — present
- Known for: Leadership, Economic activism, Investments
- Title: Chairperson of Young Women in Business Network (YWBN) and Managing Director of the YWBN Co-operative Financial Institution

Nthabeleng Likotsi is a South African accountant, entrepreneur, businesswoman, and community leader, who serves as the chairperson of the Young Women in Business Network(YWBN) and Managing Director of the YWBN Co-operative Financial Institution which is a majority female-owned and female-led financial institution. She is the first woman and youngest in the world to establish a Mutual Bank that promotes inclusive development and growth in the country and across the continent. Ms. Likotsi has headed YWBN CFI, a formation conceived of an idea to realise the objective of making basic financial services more accessible to unbanked and underbanked consumers by minimising time and distance to the nearest bank retail branch as well as reduced banking and transaction-related costs through mobile digital technology.

== Background and education ==
She was born in Botshabelo, Free State Province, in South Africa circa 1984. She holds a master's degree in Entrepreneurship from the University of the Witwatersrand, and a Certificate in Entrepreneurship, from the Wits Business School. She also has a postgraduate certificate in accounting, obtained from the University of Johannesburg.

== Career ==
Likotsi started the YWBN, along with nine other board members, in 2009. The company is managed by women from different professions and industries, with a common goal of economic empowerment of women entrepreneurs and professionals. Since 2016, Likotsi has been working to transform YWBN Cooperative Bank into YWBN Mutual Bank. Besides capital requirements in the range of R10 to R15 million (US$740,000 to US$1,120,000), one needs business premises, operating capital and trained staff. On Friday, 15 June 2018, the Reserve Bank of South Africa accepted an application from YWBN to convert the Cooperative Bank into a Mutual Bank.

== Other achievements ==
In 2013, she received the 2013/2014 Women Leadership Award at the third Africa-India Partnership Summit. She also serves as an independent non-executive director of various companies, including Apex Valves Private Limited and Ubuntu Plastics Private Limited.

== See also ==
- List of banks in South Africa
