= Kaizer Sebothelo =

Kaizer Abram Sebothelo (born 30 October 1966 – 1996) also spelled Kaiser Sebothelo was a South African anti-apartheid activist . He was the first Provincial Secretary of the African National Congress (ANC) in the Free State province following the unbanning of liberation movements in 1990.

== Early life and family ==
Sebothelo was born in a political household and raised in Botshabelo , a large township located approximately 51 kilometres east of Bloemfontein in the Free State. The township was established in 1979 under apartheid-era spatial planning policies.His mother, Mme Mmokho Sebothelo, was also an activist who sheltered and protected young freedom fighters (historically referred to as the "young lions") from apartheid security forces. She was a founding member of the ANC Women's League (ANCWL) in Botshabelo.

== Political activism ==
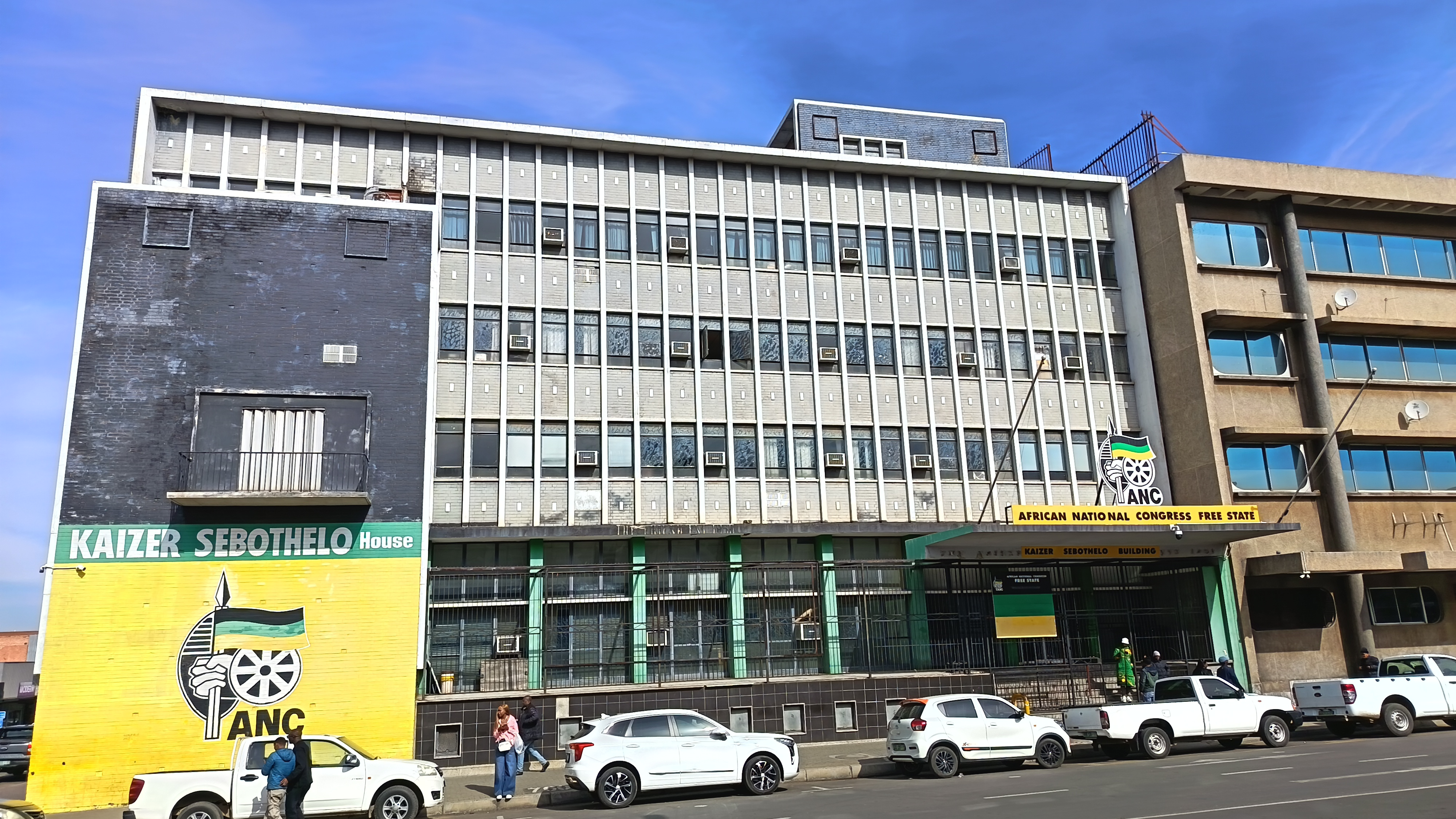
Kaizer Sebothelo House, ANC headquarters in Bloemfontein, 2026.

During the 1980s, Sebothelo became active within internal liberation structures, mobilizing youth and local communities to resist the apartheid regime in the Free State region. Following State President F. W. de Klerk's unbanning of the ANC, the South African Communist Party (SACP), and other political organizations in February 1990, Sebothelo spearheaded the formal institutionalization of the African National Congress and was elected as the first Provincial Secretary of the party in the Free State. In this capacity, he was instrumental in transitioning the ANC from an underground liberation movement into a conventional political entity across the province, establishing local branches ahead of the historic 1994 democratic elections.

== Death and legacy ==
Sebothelo died in 1996. The Kaizer Sebothelo House, the official provincial headquarters of the African National Congress in Bloemfontein, located at the intersection of Charles and Fichardt Streets, was renamed in his honor. In May 2012 the Free State Department of Sport, Arts, Culture and Recreation renamed the 20,000-capacity multi-use Botshabelo Stadium to the Kaizer Sebothelo Stadium to immortalize his role in the national liberation struggle.

== See also ==
- African National Congress
