= Platyoides robertsi =

Scientific classification
- Kingdom: Animalia
- Phylum: Arthropoda
- Subphylum: Chelicerata
- Class: Arachnida
- Order: Araneae
- Infraorder: Araneomorphae
- Family: Trochanteriidae
- Genus: Platyoides
- Species: P. robertsi

Binomial name
- Platyoides robertsi Haddad, 2022

Species of spider

Platyoides robertsi is a species of spider in the family Trochanteriidae. It is endemic to the Northern Cape province of South Africa.

== Distribution ==
Platyoides robertsi is known only from the Northern Cape, where it has been recorded from Richtersveld National Park and Akkerendam Nature Reserve near Calvinia.

== Habitat ==
Specimens have been collected under rocks on west-facing mountain slopes in Succulent Karoo vegetation.

== Description ==
Only females of Platyoides robertsi are known to science.

== Conservation ==
The species is listed as Data Deficient for taxonomic reasons, as males remain unknown and the full species range requires further study.
