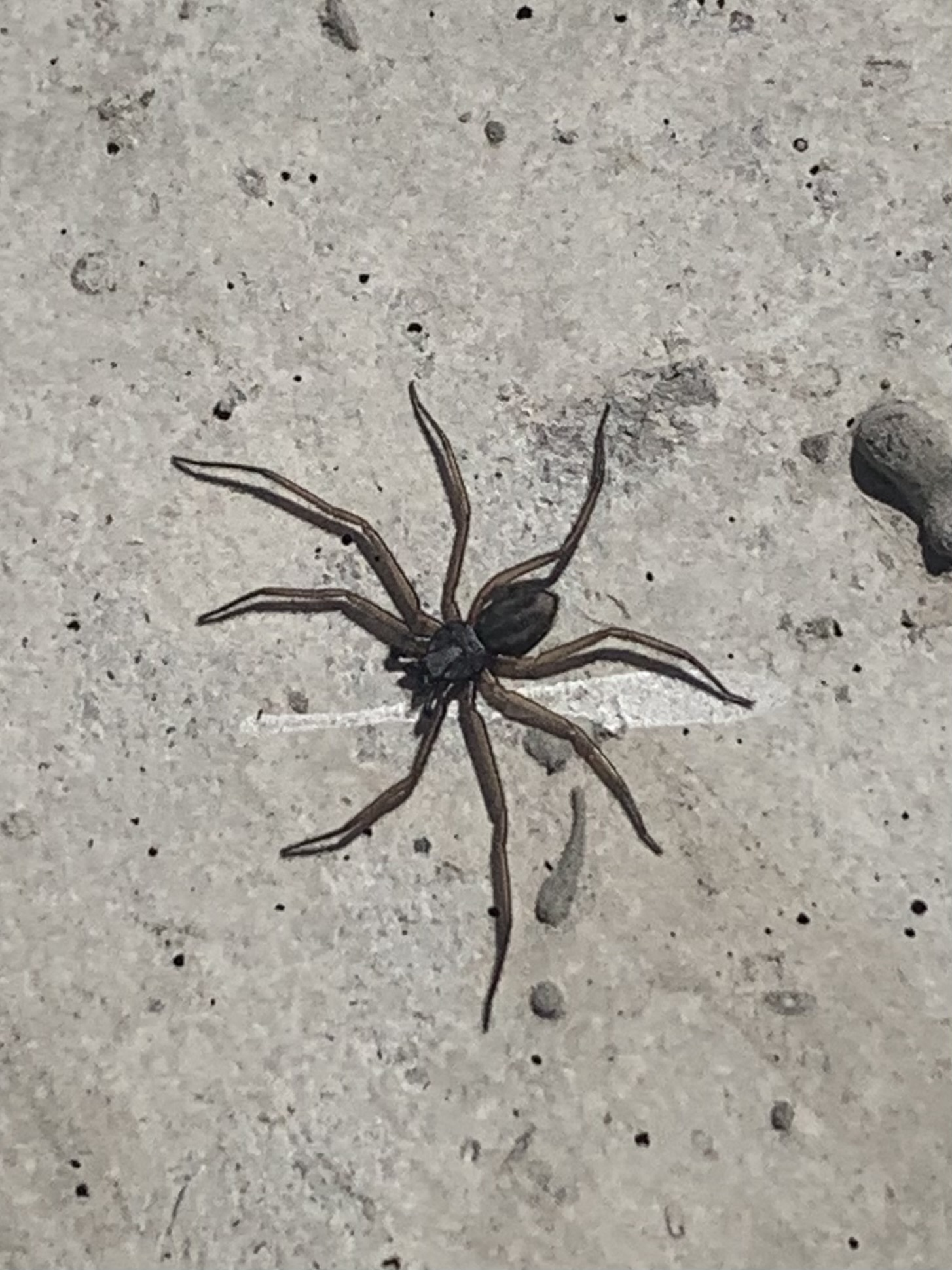
- P. grandidieri from Réunion

Scientific classification
- Kingdom: Animalia
- Phylum: Arthropoda
- Subphylum: Chelicerata
- Class: Arachnida
- Order: Araneae
- Infraorder: Araneomorphae
- Family: Trochanteriidae
- Genus: Platyoides
- Species: P. grandidieri

Binomial name
- Platyoides grandidieri Simon, 1903

= Platyoides grandidieri =

Species of spider

Platyoides grandidieri is a spider species in the genus Platyoides found in Kenya, Madagascar, Aldabra (Seychelles) and Réunion.

== See also ==
- List of spiders of Madagascar
