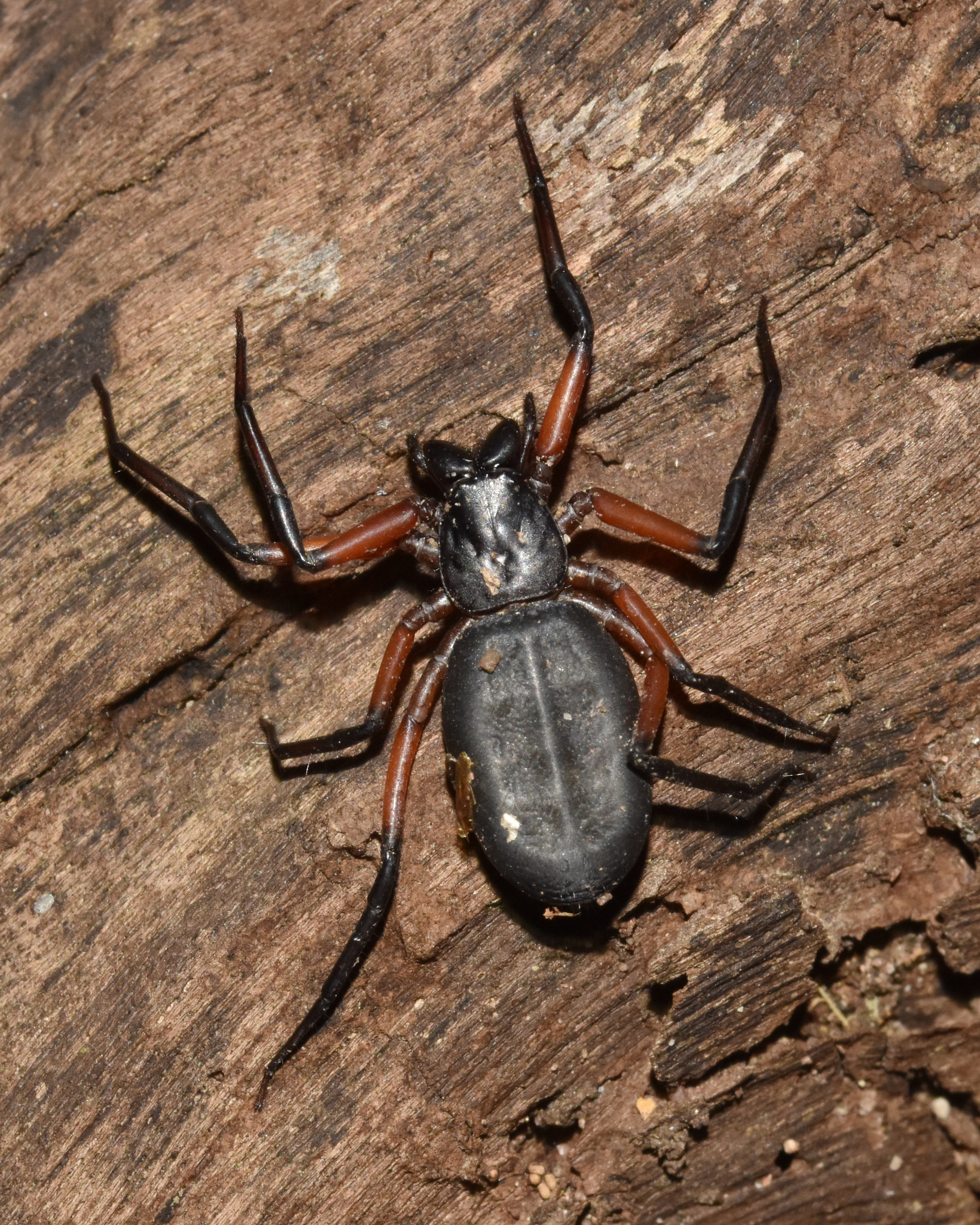
- from Durban

Conservation status
- Least Concern (SANBI Red List)

Scientific classification
- Kingdom: Animalia
- Phylum: Arthropoda
- Subphylum: Chelicerata
- Class: Arachnida
- Order: Araneae
- Infraorder: Araneomorphae
- Family: Trochanteriidae
- Genus: Platyoides
- Species: P. walteri

Binomial name
- Platyoides walteri (Karsch, 1887)

Synonyms
- Hemicloea walteri Karsch, 1887; Platyoides abrahami O. Pickard-Cambridge, 1891; Platyoides bottegi Pavesi, 1895; Platyoides laterigradus Pocock, 1898; Platyoides bidentatus Purcell, 1907; Platyoides separatus O. Pickard-Cambridge, 1908; Platyoides simonii O. Pickard-Cambridge, 1908; Corimaethes campestratus Simon, 1908; Platyoides bidentifer Strand, 1908

= Platyoides walteri =

Walter's Common Scorpion Spider

Species of spider

Platyoides walteri is a species of spider in the family Trochanteriidae. It is the most common and widespread scorpion spider in southern Africa, found in Ethiopia, Zimbabwe, Eswatini, and South Africa, and has been introduced to Australia.

== Distribution ==
Platyoides walteri has the widest distribution of any Platyoides species. In South Africa, it is found in all nine provinces at elevations ranging from 17 to 1,762 m above sea level. The species was originally described from Botshabelo in the Free State.

== Habitat ==
The species inhabits multiple biomes including Forest, Grassland, Nama Karoo, Savanna, and Thicket. It has also been recorded from commercial avocado orchards and pine plantations. Unlike other scorpion spiders that are typically found under bark or rocks, P. walteri is commonly found around human habitations, particularly under potted plants on verandahs. At Sabie State Forest, specimens were collected from pine trees using paper traps.

== Description ==
Both males and females of Platyoides walteri are known to science. The carapace and chelicerae are brown, while the sternum and three basal leg segments are orange-yellow. The sternum has a deep blackish-red border, and the remaining leg segments are more or less darkened. The opisthosoma is blackened above, sometimes with a longitudinal row of yellowish areas on each side of the median line, while the underside is paler and yellowish to whitish.

== Ecology ==
Platyoides walteri is synanthropic, frequently associated with human habitations. It is a free-living wanderer with a flattened body adapted for life in narrow crevices. The species shows remarkable adaptability to various environments and has successfully established introduced populations in Australia.

== Conservation ==
The species is listed as Least Concern due to its extremely wide geographical range and stable populations. In South Africa, it is protected in more than ten protected areas across all provinces.
