= Platyoides rossi =

Scientific classification
- Kingdom: Animalia
- Phylum: Arthropoda
- Subphylum: Chelicerata
- Class: Arachnida
- Order: Araneae
- Infraorder: Araneomorphae
- Family: Trochanteriidae
- Genus: Platyoides
- Species: P. rossi

Binomial name
- Platyoides rossi Platnick, 1985

Species of spider

Platyoides rossi is a species of spider in the family Trochanteriidae. It is endemic to the Eastern Cape province of South Africa.

== Distribution ==
Platyoides rossi is known only from the Eastern Cape, where it occurs at an elevation of 321 m above sea level. The species was originally described from Kareedouw.

== Habitat ==
The species inhabits the Thicket biome. Like other scorpion spiders, it is a free-living wanderer with a flattened body adapted for life in narrow crevices under bark or rocks.

== Description ==
Only females of Platyoides rossi are known to science. The opisthosoma is grey with longitudinal paramedian white stripes on the posterior three-quarters.

== Conservation ==
The species is listed as Data Deficient for taxonomic reasons, as males remain unknown and the full species range requires further study.
