= Platyoides pusillus =

Estcourt Scorpion Spider

Conservation status
- Least Concern (SANBI Red List)

Scientific classification
- Kingdom: Animalia
- Phylum: Arthropoda
- Subphylum: Chelicerata
- Class: Arachnida
- Order: Araneae
- Infraorder: Araneomorphae
- Family: Trochanteriidae
- Genus: Platyoides
- Species: P. pusillus

Binomial name
- Platyoides pusillus Pocock, 1898

Synonyms
- List: Platyoides pusilliformis Tucker, 1923

Species of spider

Platyoides pusillus is a species of spider in the family Trochanteriidae. It is found in Tanzania, Zimbabwe, Lesotho, and South Africa.

== Distribution ==
The species has a wide distribution across southern and eastern Africa. In South Africa, Platyoides pusillus is found in four provinces: Eastern Cape, KwaZulu-Natal, Limpopo, and Western Cape, at elevations ranging from 47 to 1,821 m above sea level. The species was originally described from Estcourt in KwaZulu-Natal.

== Habitat ==
Platyoides pusillus inhabits multiple biomes including Forest, Grassland, Savanna, and Thicket. Like other scorpion spiders, it is a free-living wanderer with a flattened body adapted for life in narrow crevices under bark or rocks.

== Description ==
Both males and females of Platyoides pusillus are known to science. The carapace is deep brown and clothed with olive-black hairs, ornamented on each side with a narrow white stripe. The chelicerae are deep brown, while the pedipalps and legs are yellowish brown. The opisthosoma is blackish above and clothed with dark olive hairs.

== Conservation ==
The species is listed as Least Concern due to its wide geographical range across multiple countries. In South Africa, it is protected in several reserves including Ndumo Game Reserve, Lhuvhondo Nature Reserve, and De Hoop Nature Reserve.
