= Platyoides costeri =

Scientific classification
- Kingdom: Animalia
- Phylum: Arthropoda
- Subphylum: Chelicerata
- Class: Arachnida
- Order: Araneae
- Infraorder: Araneomorphae
- Family: Trochanteriidae
- Genus: Platyoides
- Species: P. costeri

Binomial name
- Platyoides costeri Tucker, 1923

Species of spider

Platyoides costeri is a species of spider in the family Trochanteriidae. It is endemic to the Western Cape province of South Africa.

== Distribution ==
Platyoides costeri is known only from the Western Cape, where it has been recorded from elevations between 4 and 250 m above sea level. The species was originally described from Mossel Bay.

== Habitat ==
The species inhabits the Fynbos biome. Like other scorpion spiders, it is a free-living wanderer with a flattened body adapted for life in narrow crevices under bark or rocks.

== Description ==
Only females of the species are known to science, though males have been collected but remain undescribed.

== Conservation ==
The species is listed as Data Deficient for taxonomic reasons, as males remain unknown and the full species range requires further study. It is protected in the Robberg Nature Reserve.
