= Platyoides quinquedentatus =

Scientific classification
- Kingdom: Animalia
- Phylum: Arthropoda
- Subphylum: Chelicerata
- Class: Arachnida
- Order: Araneae
- Infraorder: Araneomorphae
- Family: Trochanteriidae
- Genus: Platyoides
- Species: P. quinquedentatus

Binomial name
- Platyoides quinquedentatus Purcell, 1907

Species of spider

Platyoides quinquedentatus is a species of spider in the family Trochanteriidae. It is endemic to the Western Cape province of South Africa.

== Distribution ==
Platyoides quinquedentatus is known only from a few localities in the Western Cape, where it occurs at elevations between 15 and 266 m above sea level. The species was originally described from Swellendam.

== Habitat ==
The species inhabits the Fynbos biome. Like other scorpion spiders, it is a free-living wanderer with a flattened body adapted for life in narrow crevices under bark or rocks.

== Description ==
Only females of Platyoides quinquedentatus are known to science. The carapace and chelicerae are dark mahogany brown, while the legs are similarly colored or lighter and more yellowish. The opisthosoma is blackened with a paler, yellowish longitudinal dorsal stripe on each side.

== Conservation ==
The species is listed as Data Deficient for taxonomic reasons, as males remain unknown and the full species range requires further study. It is protected in De Hoop Nature Reserve.
