= Platyoides alpha =

Namibia Scorpion Spider

Conservation status
- Least Concern (IUCN 3.1)

Scientific classification
- Kingdom: Animalia
- Phylum: Arthropoda
- Subphylum: Chelicerata
- Class: Arachnida
- Order: Araneae
- Infraorder: Araneomorphae
- Family: Trochanteriidae
- Genus: Platyoides
- Species: P. alpha

Binomial name
- Platyoides alpha Lawrence, 1928

Synonyms
- List: Platyoides beta Lawrence, 1928

Species of spider

Platyoides alpha is a species of spider in the family Trochanteriidae. It is found in Angola, Namibia, Botswana, and South Africa.

== Distribution ==
The species has a wide distribution across southern Africa. In South Africa, Platyoides alpha is known only from Limpopo province, where it has been recorded from elevations between 514 and 1,360 m above sea level.

== Habitat ==
Platyoides alpha inhabits the Forest and Savanna biomes. Like other scorpion spiders, it is a free-living wanderer with a flattened body adapted for life in narrow crevices under bark or rocks.

== Description ==
Both males and females of Platyoides alpha are known to science. The body size ranges from 4-9 mm. The species displays the typical characteristics of the genus, with a flattened carapace that is longer than wide, and laterally divergent chelicerae projecting forward.

== Conservation ==
The species is listed as Least Concern due to its wide geographical range across multiple countries. In South Africa, it is protected in the Limpopo Valley Nature Reserve and Entabeni State Forest.
