= Platyoides pictus =

Scientific classification
- Kingdom: Animalia
- Phylum: Arthropoda
- Subphylum: Chelicerata
- Class: Arachnida
- Order: Araneae
- Infraorder: Araneomorphae
- Family: Trochanteriidae
- Genus: Platyoides
- Species: P. pictus

Binomial name
- Platyoides pictus Pocock, 1902

Species of spider

Platyoides pictus is a species of spider in the family Trochanteriidae. It is endemic to South Africa.

== Distribution ==
Platyoides pictus is found in two provinces of South Africa: Eastern Cape and Western Cape. The species was originally described from Tea Fountain, Grahamstown, and occurs at elevations between 360 and 1,116 m above sea level.

== Habitat ==
The species inhabits the Fynbos and Thicket biomes. Like other scorpion spiders, it is a free-living wanderer with a flattened body adapted for life in narrow crevices under bark or rocks.

== Description ==
Only females of Platyoides pictus are known to science. The carapace and chelicerae are described as almost coral-red or pale yellow in young specimens, while the legs are brownish red or yellow. The opisthosoma appears ashy white in alcohol, with a broad marginal black band and a median black stripe that bifurcates anteriorly.

== Conservation ==
The species is listed as Data Deficient for taxonomic reasons, as males remain unknown and the full species range requires further study. It is protected in the Swartberg Nature Reserve and Gamkaberg Nature Reserve.
