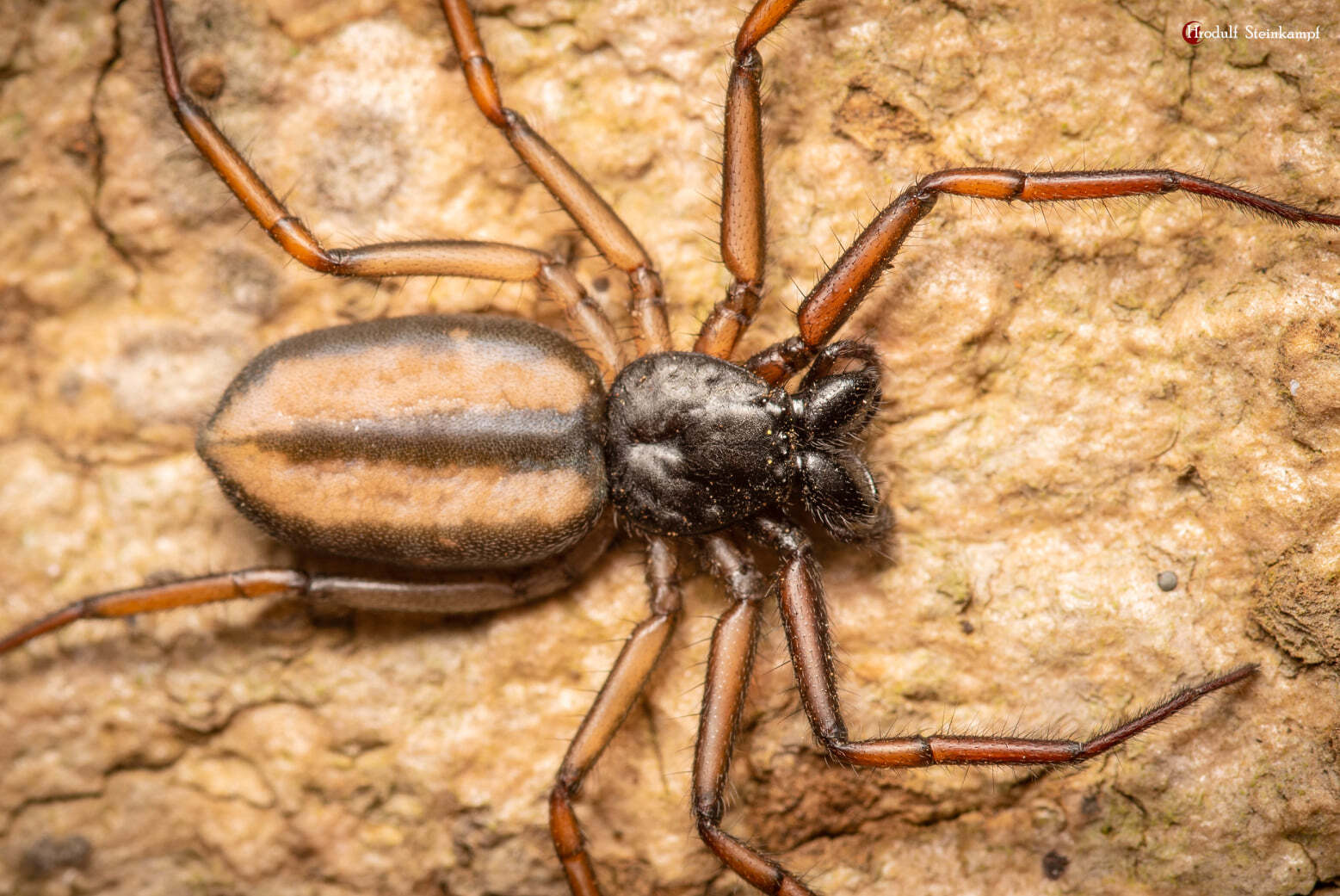

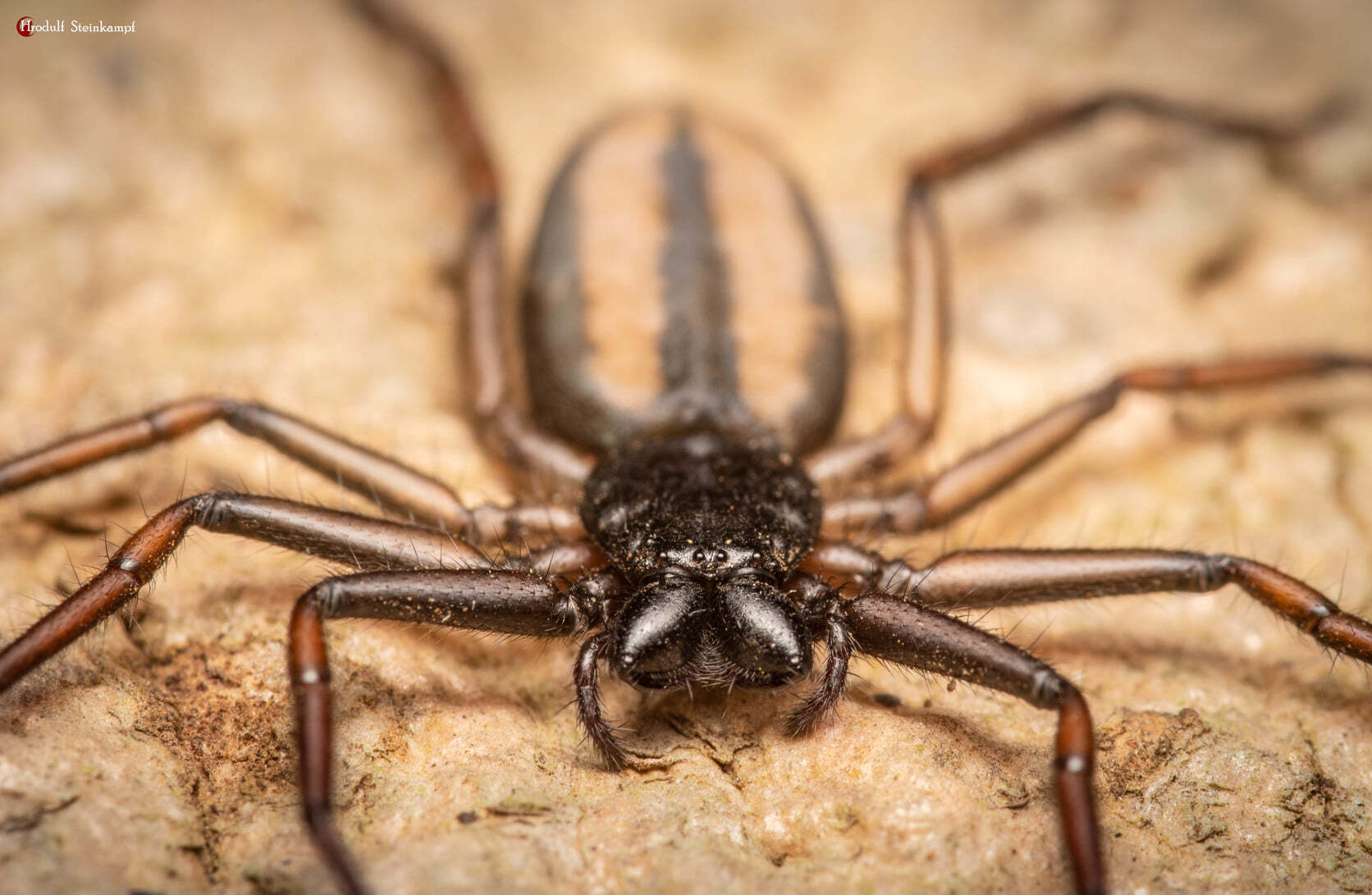

Scientific classification
- Kingdom: Animalia
- Phylum: Arthropoda
- Subphylum: Chelicerata
- Class: Arachnida
- Order: Araneae
- Infraorder: Araneomorphae
- Family: Trochanteriidae
- Genus: Platyoides
- Species: P. leppanae

Binomial name
- Platyoides leppanae Pocock, 1902

Synonyms
- List: Platyoides lawrencei Lessert, 1936

= Platyoides leppanae =

Leppan's Scorpion Spider

Species of spider

Platyoides leppanae is a species of spider in the family Trochanteriidae. It is found in Mozambique, Tanzania, Zimbabwe, and South Africa.

== Distribution ==
The species has a wide distribution across southern and eastern Africa. In South Africa, Platyoides leppanae is found in three provinces: Eastern Cape, KwaZulu-Natal, and Western Cape, at elevations ranging from 15 to 1,551 m above sea level.

== Habitat ==
Platyoides leppanae inhabits multiple biomes including Fynbos, Grassland, Nama Karoo, Savanna, and Thicket. At Ndumo Game Reserve, specimens were collected from the bark of Vachellia xanthophloea. Like other scorpion spiders, it is a free-living wanderer adapted for life in narrow crevices.

== Description ==
Both males and females of Platyoides leppanae are known to science. The carapace and chelicerae are deep blackish brown, while the legs are testaceous (brownish-yellow). The opisthosoma appears ashy or creamy white in alcohol, with a broad marginal black band and a median black stripe that narrows posteriorly.

== Conservation ==
The species is listed as Least Concern due to its wide geographical range. In South Africa, it is protected in several reserves including Mountain Zebra National Park, Addo Elephant National Park, Ndumo Game Reserve, and De Hoop Nature Reserve.
