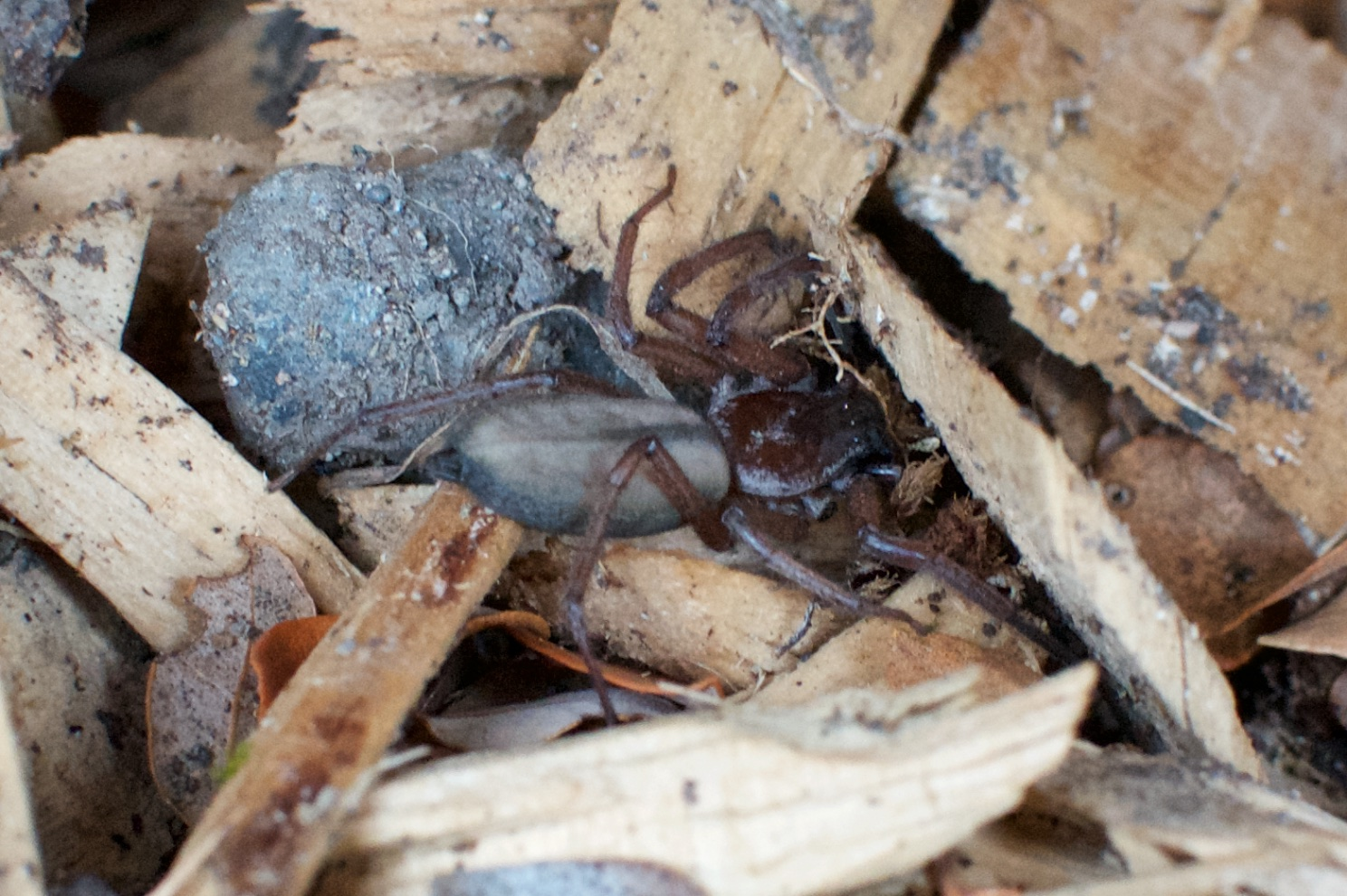

Scientific classification
- Kingdom: Animalia
- Phylum: Arthropoda
- Subphylum: Chelicerata
- Class: Arachnida
- Order: Araneae
- Infraorder: Araneomorphae
- Family: Trochanteriidae
- Genus: Hemicloea
- Species: H. rogenhoferi

Binomial name
- Hemicloea rogenhoferi L. Koch, 1875

Synonyms
- Hemicloea plautus Urquhart, 1886; Hemicloea celerrima Dalmas, 1917; Hemicloea alacris Dalmas, 1917

= Hemicloea rogenhoferi =

Species of spider

Hemicloea rogenhoferi, also known as the flattened bark spider, is a species of spider belonging to the family Trochanteriidae. The spider is endemic to the east coast of Australia. It is also naturalised in New Zealand where it has established at sites throughout the North Island and South Island.

Hemicloea rogenhoferi is a moderately large spider with a distinctively flattened body for squeezing into narrow spaces under bark.
