= Plator (spider) =

Scientific classification
- Kingdom: Animalia
- Phylum: Arthropoda
- Subphylum: Chelicerata
- Class: Arachnida
- Order: Araneae
- Infraorder: Araneomorphae
- Family: Trochanteriidae
- Genus: Plator; Simon, 1880

Type species
- P. insolens Simon, 1880

Species
- 17, see text

Synonyms
- Hitoegumoa Kishida, 1914

Genus of spiders

Plator is a genus of Asian araneomorph spiders in the family Trochanteriidae, first described by Eugène Simon in 1880.

== Species ==
As of September 2022 it contains seventeen species:

- Plator bowo Zhu, Tang, Zhang & Song, 2006 — China
- Plator cyclicus Lin & Li, 2020 — China
- Plator dazhonghua Lin & Li, 2020 — China
- Plator hanyikani Lin & Li, 2020 — China
- Plator himalayaensis Tikader & Gajbe, 1976 — India
- Plator indicus Simon, 1897 — India
- Plator insolens Simon, 1880 — China
- Plator kamurai Lin & Li, 2020 — China
- Plator kashmirensis Tikader & Gajbe, 1973 — India
- Plator nipponicus (Kishida, 1914) — China, Korea, Japan
- Plator pandeae Tikader, 1969 — India, China
- Plator pennatus Platnick, 1976 — China
- Plator qiului Lin & Li, 2020 — China
- Plator serratus Lin & Zhu, 2016 — China
- Plator soastus Zamani & Marusik, 2022 — Pakistan
- Plator solanensis Tikader & Gajbe, 1976 — India
- Plator yunlong Zhu, Tang, Zhang & Song, 2006 — China
