= Trochanteria =

Scientific classification
- Domain: Eukaryota
- Kingdom: Animalia
- Phylum: Arthropoda
- Subphylum: Chelicerata
- Class: Arachnida
- Order: Araneae
- Infraorder: Araneomorphae
- Family: Trochanteriidae
- Genus: Trochanteria; Karsch

Type species
- Trochanteria ranuncula

Species
- Trochanteria gomezi Canals, 1933; Trochanteria ranuncula Karsch, 1878; Trochanteria rugosa Mello-Leitão, 1938

Genus of spiders

Trochanteria is a genus of spiders in the family Trochanteriidae. It was first described in 1878 by Karsch. As of 2017, it contains 3 South American species.
