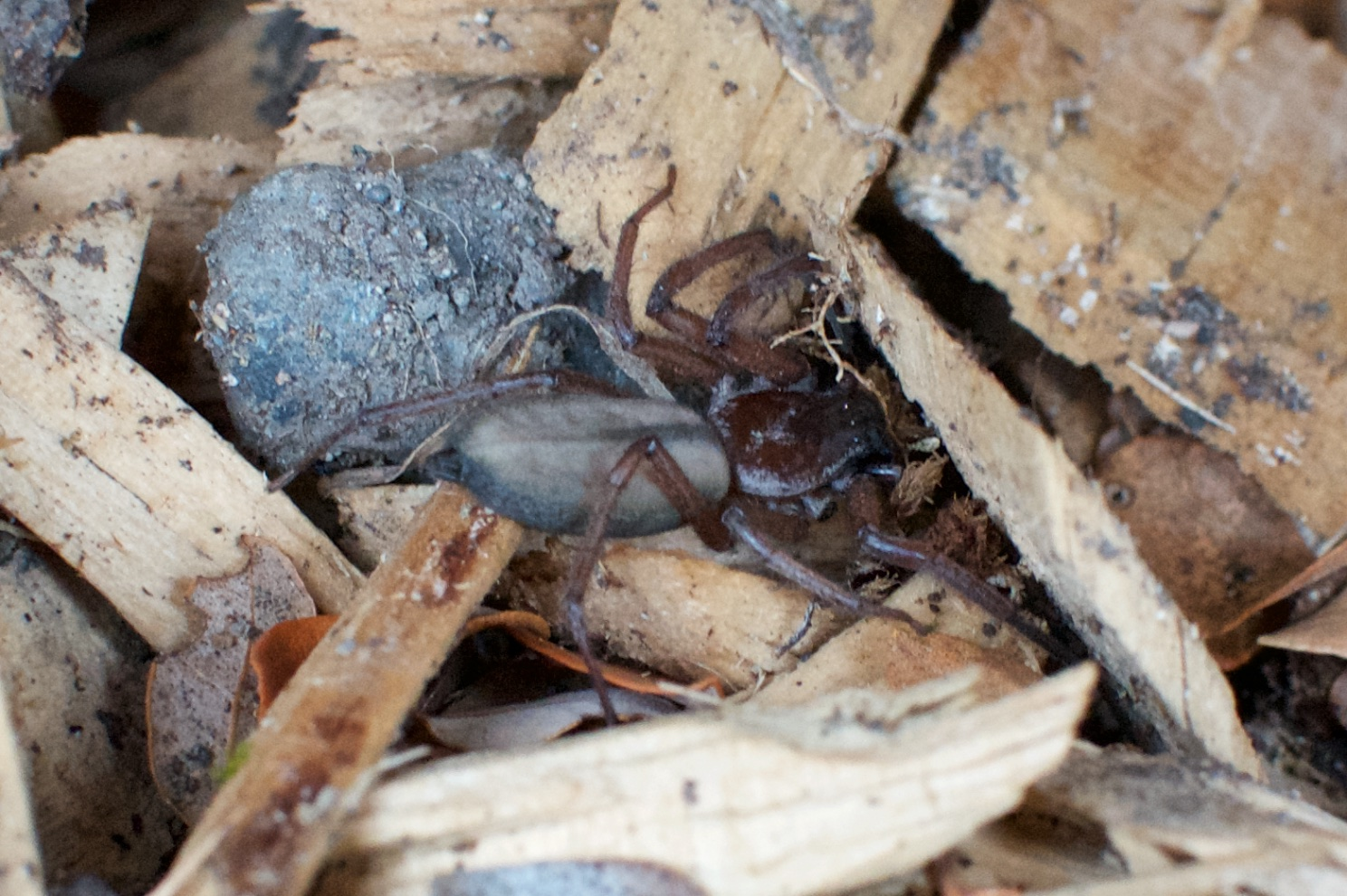
- Hemicloea rogenhoferi

Scientific classification
- Kingdom: Animalia
- Phylum: Arthropoda
- Subphylum: Chelicerata
- Class: Arachnida
- Order: Araneae
- Infraorder: Araneomorphae
- Family: Trochanteriidae
- Genus: Hemicloea; Thorell, 1870

Type species
- H. sundevalli Thorell, 1870

Species
- 13, see text

= Hemicloea =

Genus of spiders

Hemicloea is a genus of South Pacific flat spiders that was first described by Tamerlan Thorell in 1870. Originally placed with the ground spiders, it was moved to the Trochanteriidae in 2018.

== Species ==
As of May 2019 it contains thirteen species:

- Hemicloea affinis L. Koch, 1875 – Australia (New South Wales)
- Hemicloea crocotila Simon, 1908 – Australia (Western Australia)
- Hemicloea limbata L. Koch, 1875 – Australia (New South Wales)
- Hemicloea michaelseni Simon, 1908 – Australia (Western Australia)
- Hemicloea murina L. Koch, 1875 – Australia (Queensland)
- Hemicloea pacifica Berland, 1924 – New Caledonia (Loyalty Is.)
- Hemicloea plumea L. Koch, 1875 – Australia (Queensland, New South Wales, Lord Howe Is.)
- Hemicloea rogenhoferi L. Koch, 1875 – Australia (Queensland, New South Wales), New Zealand
- Hemicloea semiplumosa Simon, 1908 – Australia (Western Australia)
- Hemicloea sublimbata Simon, 1908 – Australia (Western Australia)
- Hemicloea sundevalli Thorell, 1870 (type) – Australia (Queensland, New South Wales), New Zealand
- Hemicloea tasmani Dalmas, 1917 – Australia (Tasmania)
- Hemicloea tenera L. Koch, 1876 – Australia (Queensland, New South Wales)
