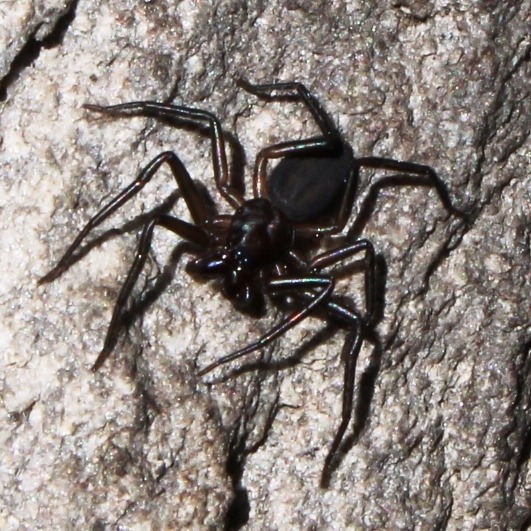
- near Capetown

Conservation status
- Least Concern (SANBI Red List)

Scientific classification
- Kingdom: Animalia
- Phylum: Arthropoda
- Subphylum: Chelicerata
- Class: Arachnida
- Order: Araneae
- Infraorder: Araneomorphae
- Family: Trochanteriidae
- Genus: Platyoides
- Species: P. pirie

Binomial name
- Platyoides pirie Platnick, 1985

= Platyoides pirie =

Pirie forest Scorpion Spider

Species of spider

Platyoides pirie is a species of spider in the family Trochanteriidae. It is endemic to South Africa.

== Distribution ==
Platyoides pirie has been recorded from two provinces in South Africa: Eastern Cape and KwaZulu-Natal. The species was originally described from Pirie Forest in the Eastern Cape and occurs at elevations between 7 and 1,488 m above sea level.

== Habitat ==
The species inhabits the Fynbos, Forest, and Savanna biomes. Like other scorpion spiders, it is a free-living wanderer with a flattened body adapted for life in narrow crevices under bark or rocks.

== Description ==
Only females of Platyoides pirie are known to science. The opisthosoma is light grey with a slightly darkened cardiac area.

== Conservation ==
Despite being known from only one sex, the species is listed as Least Concern due to its wide geographic distribution. It is protected in the iSimangaliso Wetland Park and Asante Sana Private Game Reserve.
