= Doliomalus =

Scientific classification
- Kingdom: Animalia
- Phylum: Arthropoda
- Subphylum: Chelicerata
- Class: Arachnida
- Order: Araneae
- Infraorder: Araneomorphae
- Family: Trochanteriidae
- Genus: Doliomalus
- Species: D. cimicoides

Binomial name
- Doliomalus cimicoides (Nicolet, 1849)

Genus of spiders

Doliomalus is a genus of spiders in the family Trochanteriidae. It was first described in 1897 by Simon. As of 2017, it contains only one species, Doliomalus cimicoides, found in Chile.
