= Vectius =

Scientific classification
- Kingdom: Animalia
- Phylum: Arthropoda
- Subphylum: Chelicerata
- Class: Arachnida
- Order: Araneae
- Infraorder: Araneomorphae
- Family: Gnaphosidae
- Genus: Vectius; Simon, 1897
- Species: V. niger

Binomial name
- Vectius niger (Simon, 1880)

Genus of spiders

Vectius is a monotypic genus of South American flat spiders containing the single species, Vectius niger. It was first described by Eugène Simon in 1897, and has only been found in Brazil, Paraguay, and Argentina.
