= Katlego Maphathe =

South African soccer player

Personal information
- Full name: Katlego Jackson Maphathe
- Date of birth: 23 April 1993 (age 33)
- Place of birth: Botshabelo, South Africa
- Position: Midfielder

Team information
- Current team: Durban City

Youth career
- Bloemfontein Celtic

Senior career*
Years	Team	Apps	(Gls)
2012–2014	Roses United	26	(5)
2014–2015	Free State Stars	0	(0)
2015–2016	African Warriors	39	(1)
2016–2017	Thanda Royal Zulu	6	(1)
2017–2023	Richards Bay	150	(8)
2024	Cape Town Spurs	12	(1)
2024–	Durban City	2	(0)
- * Club domestic league appearances and goals as of 10 September 2024

Katlego Jackson Maphathe (born 23 April 1993) is a South African soccer player who plays as a midfielder for Durban City in the National First Division.

He hails from Botshabelo. He was a youth player in Bloemfontein Celtic and started his senior career in Roses United in the second tier. After that, he joined the development squad of Free State Stars, but went on loan to African Warriors before joining the team permanently.

In the 2016–17 National First Division, he played for Thanda Royal Zulu. The team won the championship but was not promoted to the Premier Division, since the owners sold the rights to AmaZulu. Maphathe joined Richards Bay, also on the second tier. He gained recognition when Richards Bay eliminated Kaizer Chiefs from the 2020–21 Nedbank Cup, being named man of the match.

Having played ten straight seasons in the second tier, Maphathe helped Richards Bay win promotion from the 2021–22 National First Division to the 2022-23 South African Premier Division and played as a team regular. Maphathe was the team captain. Following his performances in 2022–23, Maphathe was named in the preliminary South Africa squad for the 2023 COSAFA Cup.

Having played four games of the 2023–24 South African Premier Division, Maphathe's contract with Richards Bay was suddenly discontinued. The club's decision was described as a "big shock", and may have been financially motivated. Maphathe considered taking the club to a legal tribunal. He was, however, picked up by Cape Town Spurs during the winter transfer window.
