= Katlego Ncala =

South African TV personality (born 2000)

Katlego Ncala is a South African television personality, entrepreneur and model. Katlego Ncala is the first South African to be crowned Miss Teen World. She is South Africa's director of Miss International and Miss Teenager South Africa.

== Career background ==
Katlego Ncala was born in 2000 in Parktown, South Africa. She attended her early education at Crawford Sandton, then in 2016 she went on to complete her A Levels at the British International College.

In 2013, Katlego established the Dream Girls annual pageant. She then began participating at modeling pageants and she won American Amateur Model and Talent Competition (AAMTC) Model of the Year, then Miss Teen Africa 2014, WLBF Miss Teen World 2015 (Turkey) and Miss Teenager Earth 2018 (Mexico).

Katlego made her debut on television in 2016 as a presenter for SABC 1's YoTV flagship show Youth Entertainment. She also hosted the Blue Couch on YoTV and it is during that stint when she was given the name “South Africa Queen Of Talk”. Katlego hosted the Gauteng Sports Awards 2016 and also presented Spotlight on One Gospel in 2017.

In 2018, she was announced as one of Fanta South Africa's faces for the company's advert series called Fanta Squad and in 2019 she hosted the Miss Teenager Universe Pageant in Guatemala.

== Awards ==
- Amped Festival - Inspiration Of The Year 2017
- Woman Of Stature - Youth Ambassador 2018
- South Africa Woman of Stature - Woman Of The Year 2018
- Fabulous Woman Girl of the Year 2018
