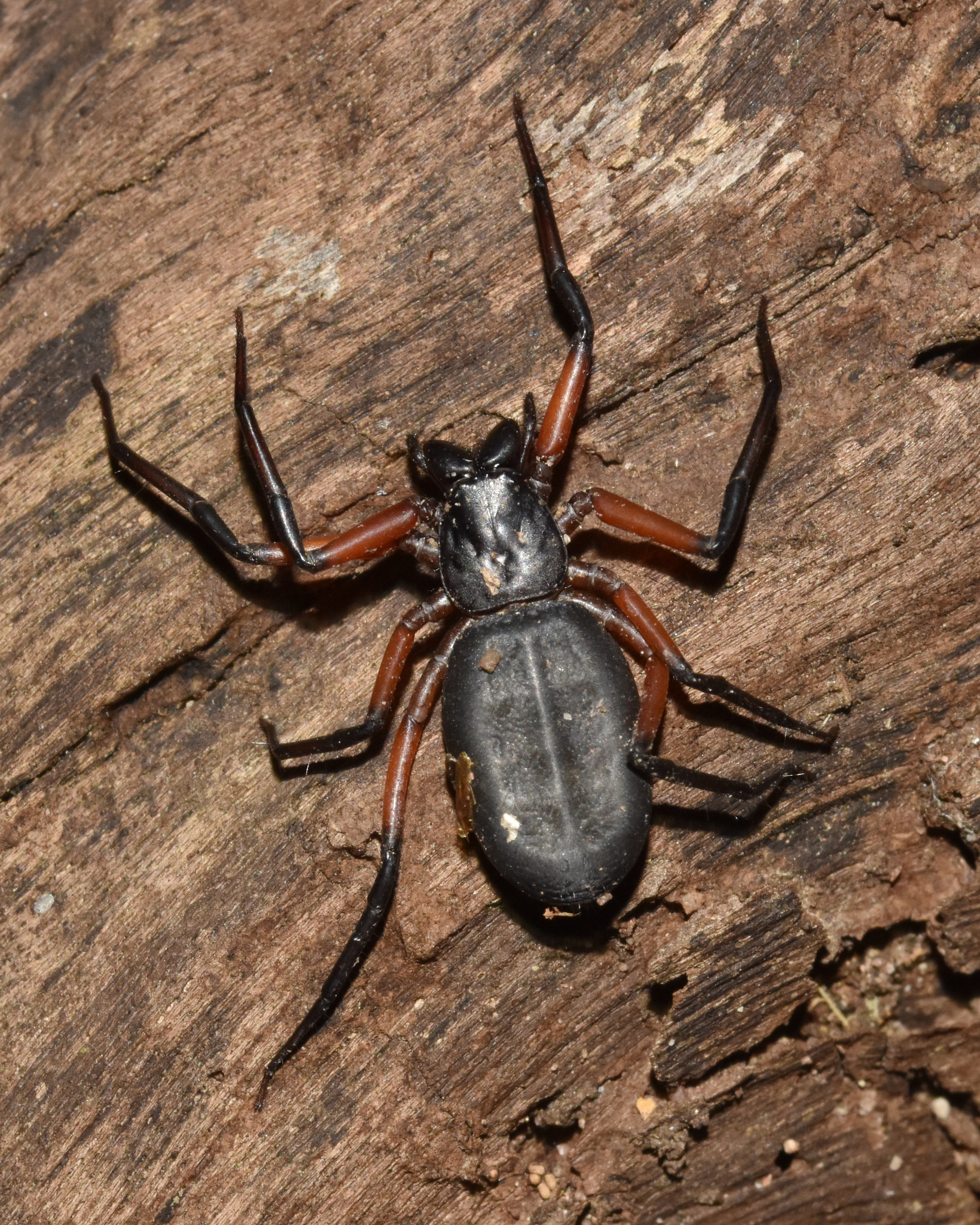
- P. walteri from South Africa
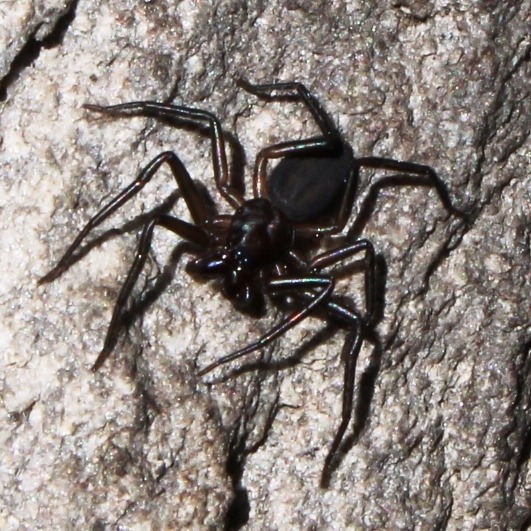
- P. pirie from South Africa

Scientific classification
- Kingdom: Animalia
- Phylum: Arthropoda
- Subphylum: Chelicerata
- Class: Arachnida
- Order: Araneae
- Infraorder: Araneomorphae
- Family: Trochanteriidae
- Genus: Platyoides; O. Pickard-Cambridge, 1891

Species
- See text.

= Platyoides =

Scorpion spiders

Genus of spiders

Platyoides is a genus of spiders belonging to the family Trochanteriidae. Its members are known as scorpion spiders and are found in sub-Saharan Africa and its islands, Madagascar, Réunion, Aldabra and the Canary Islands.

The genus is nocturnal in habit and has developed extreme flattening of the body adapted to living in narrow cracks, particularly under loose bark.

== Origin of the word 'Platyoides' ==
The ancient Greek language is the basis a vast array of scientific terminology. The word 'Platyoides' is a compound word broken up into two distinct parts. The first element of the word 'Platyoides' is 'Platy'. The ancient Greek definition of 'Platy' means broad and flat. This first section of the word directly relates to the asethic genetic makeup of the genus. The second element of the word which also originates from the Ancient Greek language is 'oid'. 'Oid' means 'form of'. Together the two segments of this compound word confirms this distinct feature of the flat back and gives this genus its name.

== Common names ==
The common name scorpion spider is derived from its distinctive flat back and carapace orange colouring. This colouring is evident around the mouthpiece and on the anterior aspects of the legs. These similar features of the genus Platyoides in comparison to a scorpion is often why this genus is referred to as the scorpion spider.

== Taxonomy ==
The genus Platyoides was erected by Octavius Pickard-Cambridge in an article in volume 58 of the Proceedings of the Zoological Society of London dated 1890 but published in 1891.

As a result of DNA testing, the genus Platyoides has been deemed a member of the Trochanteriidae family. Substantial interest in the genus Platyoides would have been sparked by their unique ability to flatten their abdomen in order to adapt to their environment. South African arachnologist and myriapodologist described Platyoides using specimens submitted to him for identification by the Director of the Transvaal Museum and Mr V. Fitzsimons, Keeper of the Invertebrate collections at the Natal Museum, Pietermaritzburg.

The collection consisted of thirty-three species all in the genus Platyoides. The spider genus Platyoides is part of the Trochanteriidae fauna species that was first recorded by in 1903 and was given the binomial name of Platyoides grandidieri. This genus is unique to sub-Saharan Africa and its surrounding islands. Further genomic differences have too contributed to being able to determine the ancestry of the genus Platyoides by creating a lineage diversification system.

=== Species ===
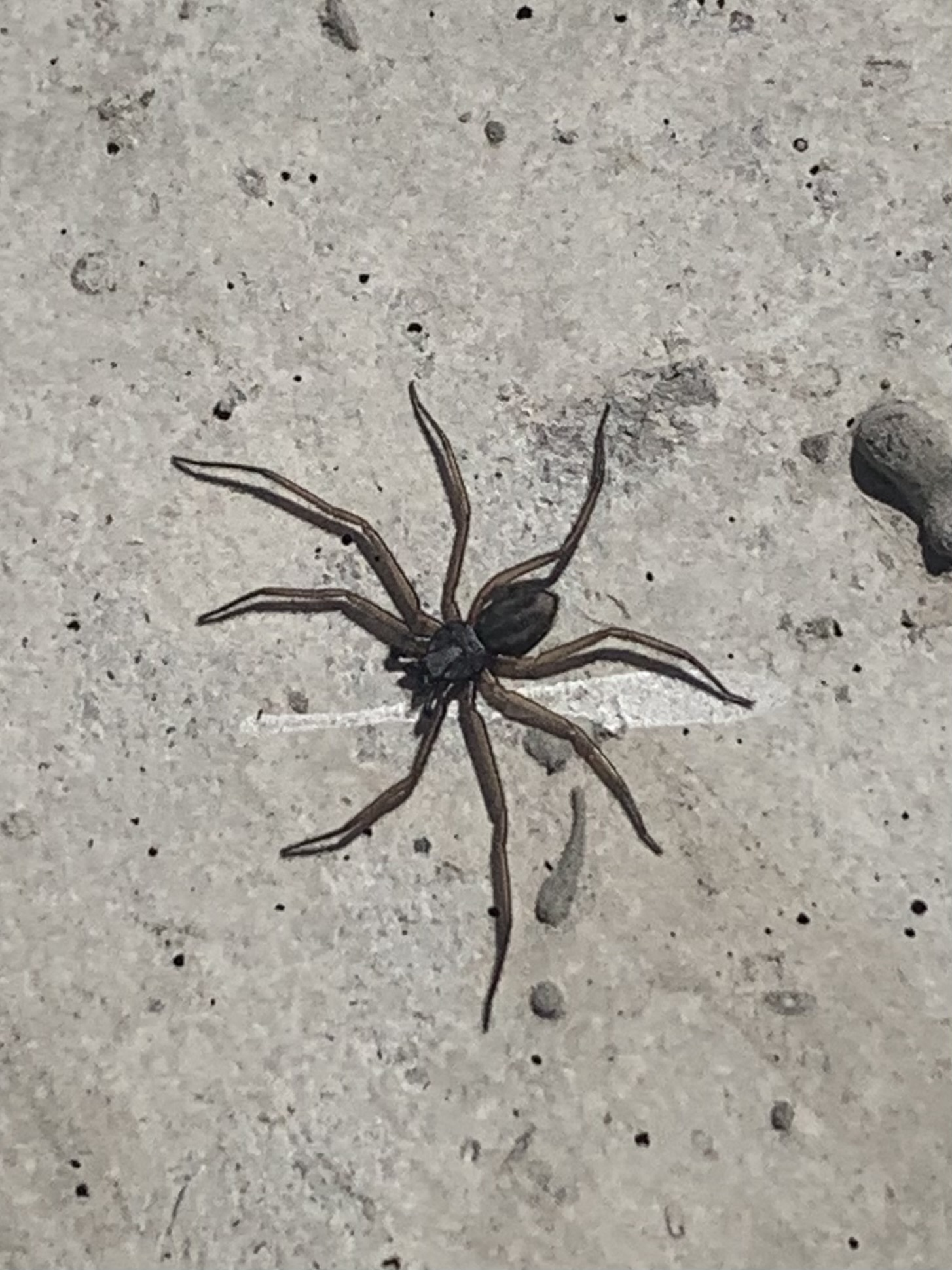
P. grandidieri from Réunion

As of September 2025, the World Spider Catalog accepted the following species:

- Platyoides alpha Lawrence, 1928 — Angola, Namibia, South Africa
- Platyoides costeri Tucker, 1923 — South Africa
- Platyoides fitzsimonsi Lawrence, 1938 — Namibia
- Platyoides grandidieri Simon, 1903 — Kenya, Madagascar, Aldabra, Réunion
- Platyoides leppanae Pocock, 1902 — Mozambique, South Africa
- Platyoides mailaka Platnick, 1985 — Madagascar
- Platyoides pictus Pocock, 1902 — South Africa
- Platyoides pirie Platnick, 1985 — South Africa
- Platyoides pusillus Pocock, 1898 — Tanzania, Zimbabwe, South Africa
- Platyoides quinquedentatus Purcell, 1907 — South Africa
- Platyoides ravina Andriamalala & Ubick, 2007 — Madagascar
- Platyoides robertsi Haddad, 2022 — South Africa
- Platyoides rossi Platnick, 1985 — South Africa
- Platyoides vao Andriamalala & Ubick, 2007 — Madagascar
- Platyoides velonus Platnick, 1985 — Madagascar
- Platyoides venturus Platnick, 1985 — Canary Islands
- Platyoides walteri (Karsch, 1886) — East, Southern Africa, introduced in Australia

== Description ==
The body size of the genus Platyoides is sexually dimorphic, females being much larger than males. The most notable feature of the genus is its flat back creating a large surface area. The species of the genus have a unique ability to flatten their abdomen due to a genetic predisposition that results in loose trochantheriids and gnapsoides. This means they have loose joints allowing them to flatten their bodies; a direct product of their environment. The introduction of new research techniques including a scanning electron microscopy helped aid to distinguish between different species and determine these unique genus qualities.

Another notable feature that links to their common name the ‘scorpion spider’ is the colouring of the genus Platyoides. A distinct carapace orange surrounds the mouth, radiating down onto their legs and on the dorsal aspect of their abdomen. The anterior side of the abdomen is a pale, ashy grey. The genus has a unique feature in their teeth with a triangular tooth existing on their upper margins, behind the regular fangs which aids in chewing prey. Another defining feature of the genus Platyoides description is the elongation of the fourth trochanter. The dimensions of the genus Platyoides species is 9mm with the carapace measuring 3.6mm.

=== Similar Species ===
==== Solifugae ====
There is a species of spider-like arachnid that is commonly mistaken for the genus Platyoides. This species is called the Scorpion spider also known as the Solifugae. There are a number of similarities between the Solifugae and the genus Platyoides. The main similarity is the anatomy and colouring of the two species. In particular, the Solifugae and the genus Platyoides share the distinctive feature of longer than average extremities that aid both of the arachnid species to flatten themselves under rocks and bark. Both species possess a distinct orange colour that aids them in camouflaging to their environment. The Solifugae is often found living in semidesert environments existing on all continents except for Australian and Antarctica.

== Behaviour ==
A distinctive feature of the behaviour of the genus Platyoides is a unique adaptation. The genus is a product of its sub-Saharan environment and has developed an extreme flattening of their back and abdomen. The flattening of the body is an adaptation that allows the genus Platyoides to living under bark and in small cracks.

Many specimens of the genus have been found in these areas and has become a distinctive feature of the species’ natural history. Despite being a nocturnal species, the carapace orange that follows a number of the main body features of the genus including the abdomen and legs. This colour aids in camouflage for the species as the colour is similar to that of the robust, sandy environment.

== Distribution and habitat ==
The genus Platyoides is found in sub-Saharan Africa and the surrounding islands it entails including Madagascar, Reunion, Aldabra and the Canary Islands.

The genus Platyoides is nocturnal. If a species such as the genus Platyoides is nocturnal they become their most active in the evenings throughout the night and find relief during the day. All animals including the 'Platyoides' genus need to have an element of withdrawal from activity to drop their metabolic rate.

There is little evidence to suggest what the length of the inactivity period is. Spiders that hunt for prey during the daylight are species that tend to rely on their eyesight as opposed to their webs and traps. The taxonomic position of the genus and the interrelationships the genus Platyoides shares with other genus’ is often questioned.

Other species exist in the Canary Islands, however no species similar to the genus Platyoides exist north of Africa. It has been deemed by arachnologist Norman I. Platnick that the genus is old and a substantial element of the species diversification occurred prior to Madagascar separating from continental Africa.

=== Other locations ===
There are nine species of the genus found in South Africa. One of these nine species has recently been found in South Australia, Australia. Sightings from this species found in South Australia were only inside a man made building.

== Risk to humans ==
There is little evidence to suggest that the genus Platyoides genus poses any risk to humans.
