= Botshabelo, Free State =

Botshabelo
- Township
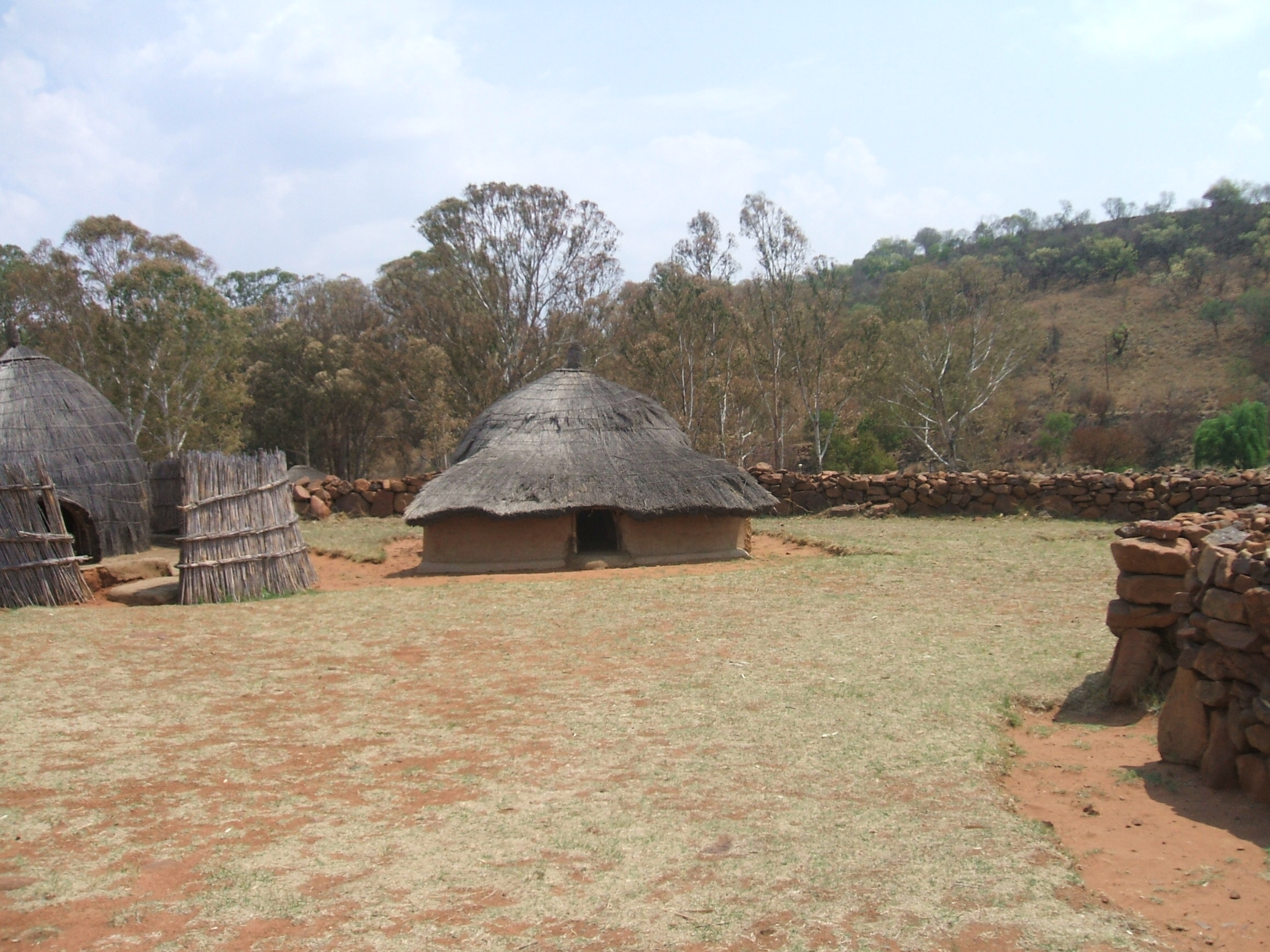
- Interactive map of Botshabelo
- Country: South Africa
- Province: Free State
- Municipality: Mangaung
- Established: 1979

Area
  - Total: 160.2 km^{2} (61.9 sq mi)

Population
  - Total: 900,712 (2,023)
  - Density: 5,622/km^{2} (14,560/sq mi)
- Postal code: 9781
- Area code: 051

Shacks in Botshabelo-F

Botshabelo, meaning "a place of refuge", is a large township set up in 1979. It is located east of Bloemfontein in the present-day Free State province of South Africa. Botshabelo is now the largest township in Free State and is the second largest township in South Africa.

== History ==
As many people moved away from the farms in the Free State, they looked for places to stay in the region of Thaba 'Nchu, another homeland under the old Bophuthatswana government.

The policy governing Bophutatswana at the time clearly stated that Bophutatswana belongs to those who are of Tswana people. As a result, all other peoples, mainly Sotho and Xhosa, were housed at a squatter camp named “Kromdraai”. Kromdraai was initiated by a man who was only referred to as "Khoza". He was selling a stand for only 50 cents around the year of 1976.

Later on the government of Bophutatswana started to strongly condemn the development of that area and worked hard through their police force during the day and night, striving to dispatch everybody living in the region and who is not a Tswana. As the pressure mounted for the people of Kromdraai, Khoza fled and he was no longer to be seen.

In 1979, the then Prime Minister of QwaQwa, Kenneth Mopeli together with the apartheid government found a place for all the people of Kromdraai at a farm called Onverwacht. All the people who were not Tswana started to move to Onverwacht for free, and later on when they started to settle in the area paid ZAR80 for a stand. Late in 1980 to early 1981 the name Onverwacht started to disappear and people started to call their place by the name of Botshabelo, this name given by Julius Nkoko.

== Economy ==
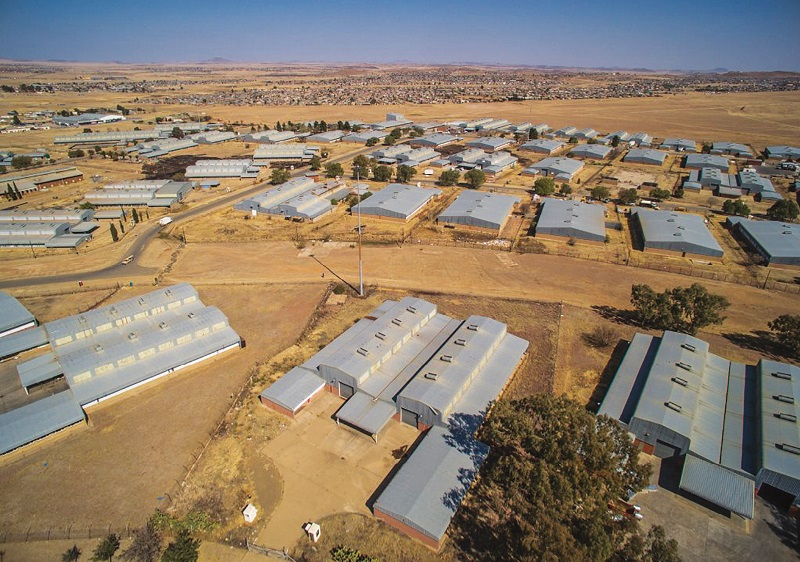
The industrial park

Botshabelo has a large industrial park with large companies located there. The economy of this township is based on production of food, clothing and other goods. The poultry producing company [Supreme poultry Pty (Ltd)] is located here. Capitec Bank and Shoprite has three branches and supermarkets in this township respectively.

== Transport ==
Botshabelo is served by several commuter bus lines traveling local and long distances on a daily basis. The township is located on the main railway line between Bloemfontein and Maseru, as well as on the N8, the main road between the two towns. The township still has unnamed streets, but the development of upgrading and naming of streets and roads are underway. There is also a new taxi rank at the newly built Botshabelo Mall.

== Education ==
Botshabelo has over 65 primary and secondary schools. Motheo FET College has a satellite campus in this township.

== Sports ==
Botshabelo is one of the towns that have produced soccer players for the Premier Soccer League (PSL), especially for Bloemfontein Celtics, players such as James Madidilane, Ditheko Mototo, the late Abram Raselemane, Ntho Moshe, Motseothata November, Ace Gulwa, Lefu Nyapuli, Moeketsi Sekola, Teboho Salemane and others. Kaizer Sebothelo Stadium is the main sporting venue in Botshabelo with a capacity of 20 000 seats, including a sporting arena where indoor sports are played, as well as a newly revamped recreational swimming pool open to the public.

== Notable people ==
- Fikile Mbalula, politician, born in Botshabelo
- Katlego Maphathe, soccer player, born in Botshabelo
