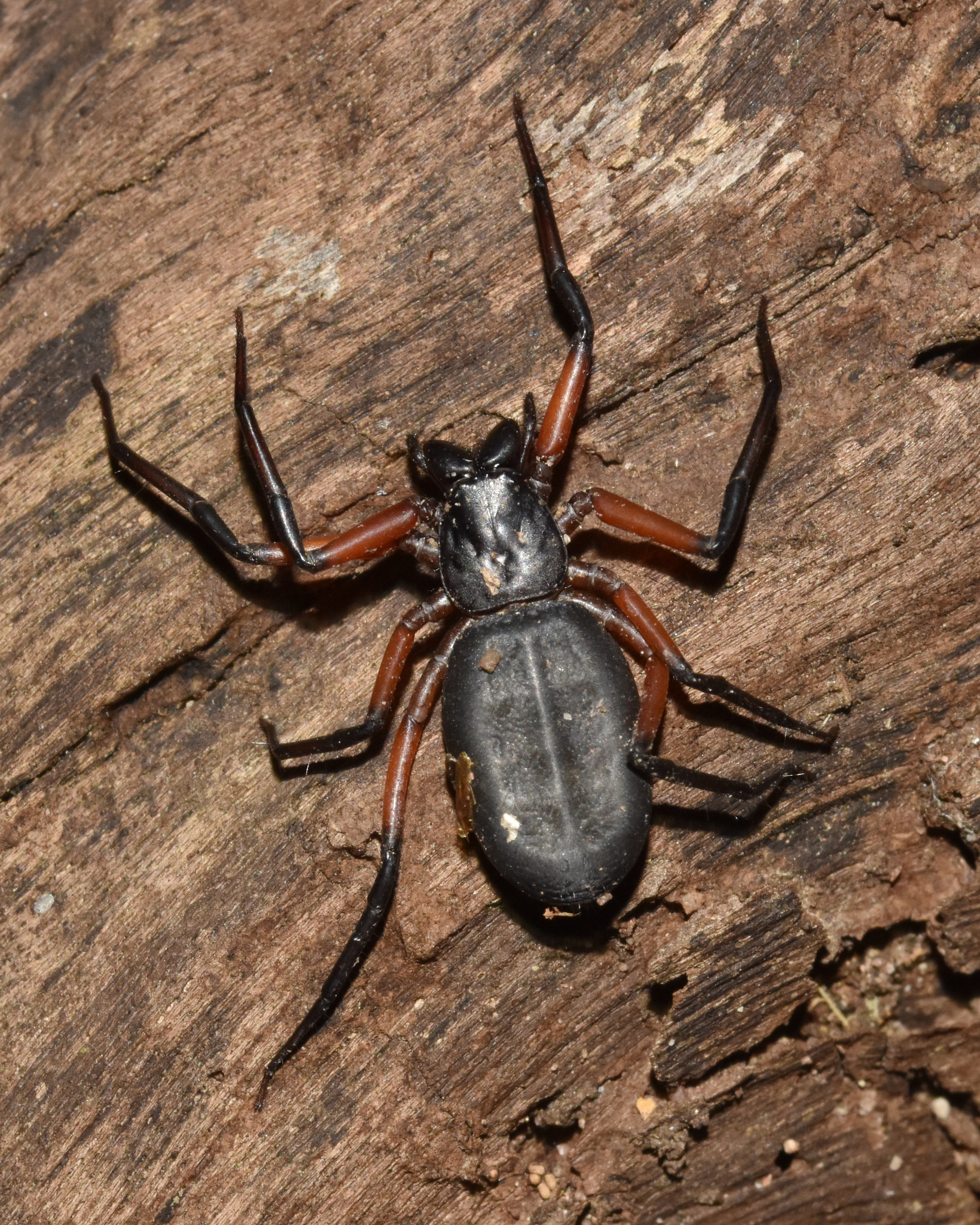
- Platyoides walteri from South Africa
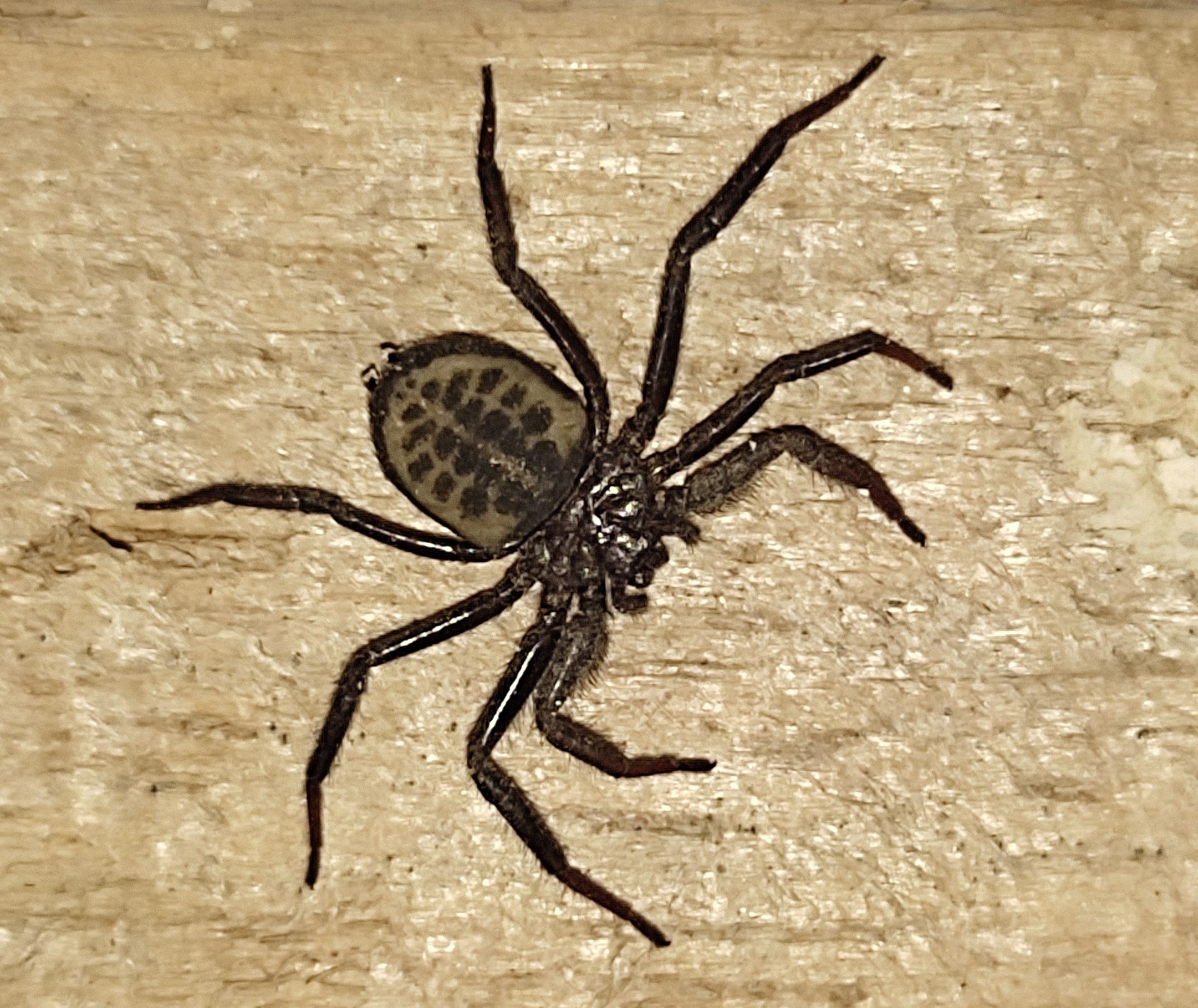
- Vectius niger

Scientific classification
- Kingdom: Animalia
- Phylum: Arthropoda
- Subphylum: Chelicerata
- Class: Arachnida
- Order: Araneae
- Infraorder: Araneomorphae
- Family: Trochanteriidae; Karsch, 1879

Diversity
- 6 genera, 51 species
- blue: reported countries (WSC) green: observation hotspots (iNaturalist)

Synonyms
- Hemicloeinae; Platoridae

= Trochanteriidae =

Flat spiders Temporal range: Palaeogene–present

Family of spiders

Trochanteriidae is a family of spiders first described by Ferdinand Karsch in 1879 containing about 52 species in 6 genera. The family can be found in Oceania, South America, Africa and Asia.

== Distribution ==
Three genera are found in South America. Members of the genus Hemicloea are restricted to Oceania, while genus Platyoides is found in large parts of Africa. Plator is found from Pakistan to Japan.

== Genera ==
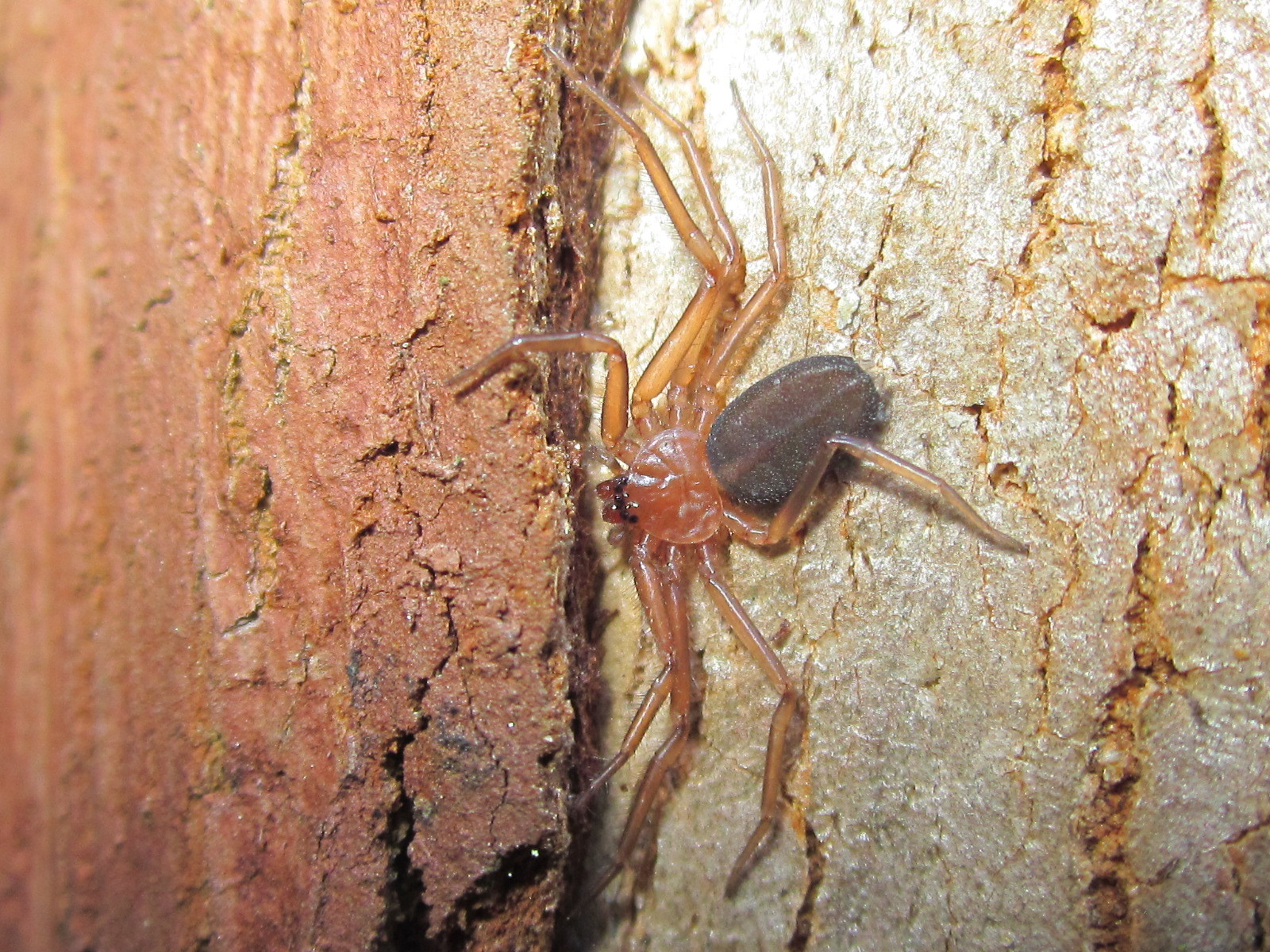
Doliomalus cimicoides

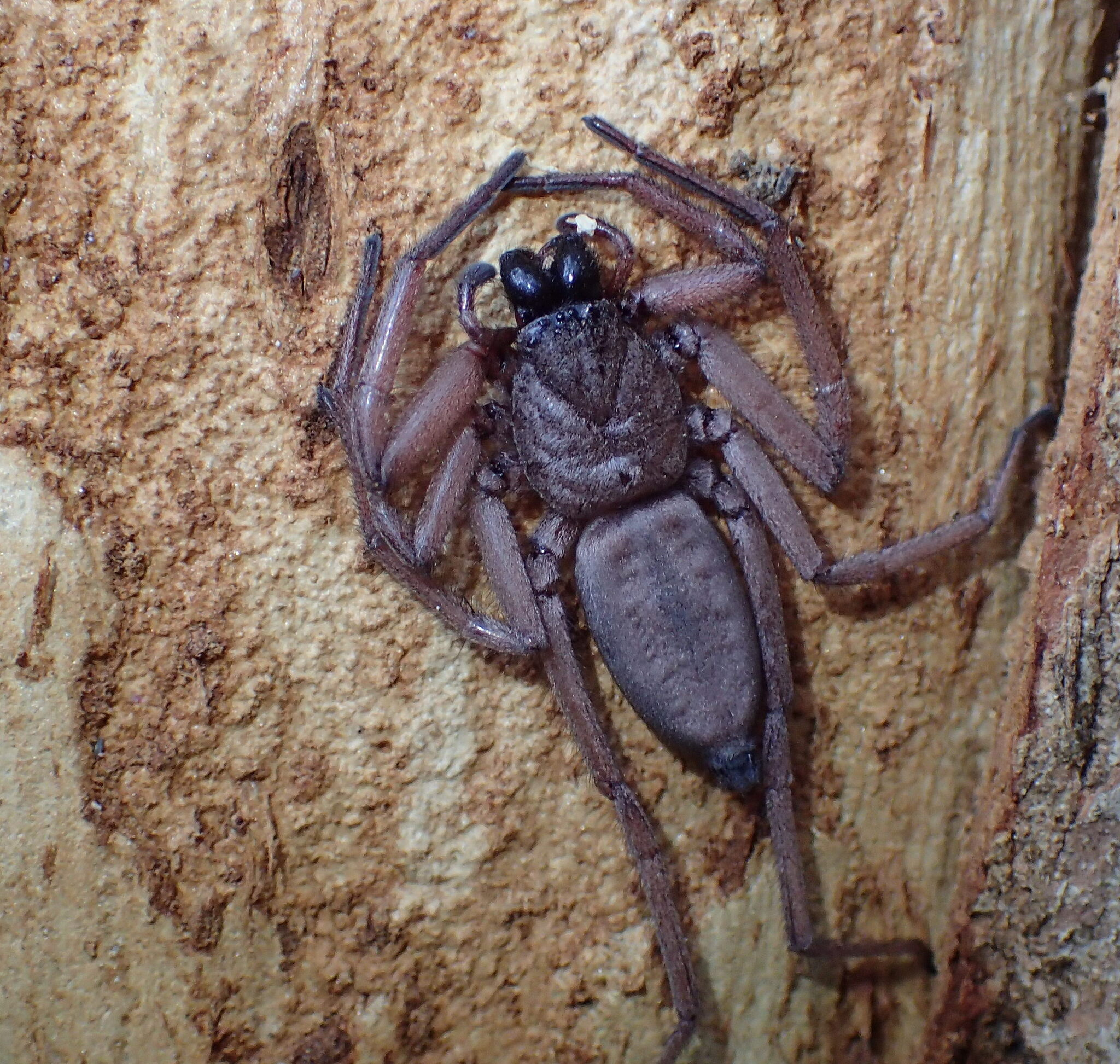
Hemicloea rogenhoferi

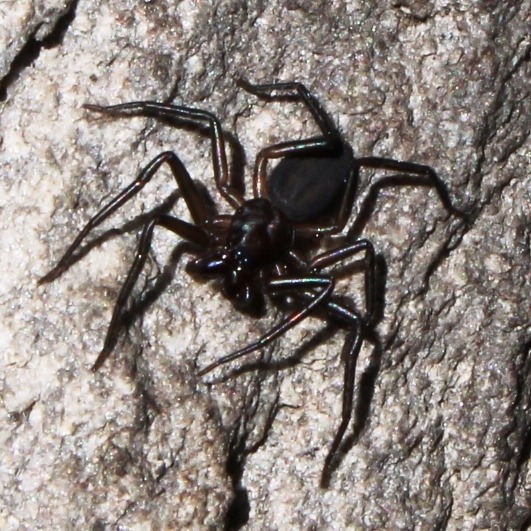
Platyoides pirie

As of January 2026, this family includes six genera and 51 species:

- Doliomalus Simon, 1897 – Chile
- Hemicloea Thorell, 1870 – Australia, New Caledonia, New Zealand. Introduced to New Zealand
- Plator Simon, 1880 – China, Japan, Korea, India, Pakistan
- Platyoides O. Pickard-Cambridge, 1891 – Africa, Canary Islands. Introduced to Australia
- Trochanteria Karsch, 1878 – Argentina, Brazil, Paraguay
- Vectius Simon, 1897 – South America
